= Miracle (2019 film) =

2019 documentary film

Miracle (pt-BR: Milagre) is a 2019 documentary film with Wolfgang Smith, Olavo de Carvalho, and Raphael De Paola.

It was directed by Brazilian Mauro Ventura.

It is about a struggling mother who runs from church to church to find a miracle for her daughter who has a mysterious disability.
