= O Terceiro Travesseiro (film) =

2012 film based on novel by Nelson Luiz de Carvalho

The Third Pillow
- Theatrical release poster
- Screenplay by: Daniel Moreno Sant'Anna; Nelson Luiz Carvalho
- Based on: O Terceiro Travesseiro by Nelson Luiz de Carvalho
- Produced by: Letícia Segabinazi Dumas da Silva
- Starring: Cláudio Heinrich; Pedro Andrade
- Production company: De La Jara
- Release date: March 19, 2012 (Brazil)
- Running time: 110 minutes
- Country: Brazil
- Language: Portuguese
- Budget: $998,000

O Terceiro Travesseiro (English: The Third Pillow) is a Brazilian fiction feature film based on Nelson Luiz de Carvalho's popular novel of the same name. It was produced by Letícia Segabinazi Dumas da Silva with a screenplay by Daniel Moreno Sant'Anna. This film focuses on the development of the relationship between teenage boy Marcus and his best friend Renato.

== Plot ==
During the adolescence, two teenage friends find themselves in love and have to face the prejudices of a conservative society.

== Cast ==
- Cláudio Heinrich as Marcus
- Pedro Andrade as Renato
- Patricia Araujo as Beatriz
- Priscila Machado as Ana
- Fernando Sippel as Giorgio
- Gustavo Gianetti as Carlos
- Marlon Teixeira as Júlio
- Ariela Valenssa as Inês
- Valéria Massotti as Lúcia

== Music ==
The score for O Terceiro Travesseiro was composed by Juliano Silva, with the rest of the soundtrack chosen by music supervisor Sandra Roccove.

== Production ==
The project was in development for approximately three years, during which time a screen adaptation that differed significantly from the novel was written. De La Jara acquired the rights to the novel after three years of the project's stagnant development.
