= O Jardim das Aflições =

1995 book by Olavo de Carvalho

- Cover of the 3rd edition of the book
- Author: Olavo de Carvalho
- Language: Portuguese
- Subject: Philosophy, History, and Social Sciences
- Genre: non-fiction
- Publisher: Vide Editorial
- Publication date: 1995
- Pages: 464
- ISBN: 9788567394510

O Jardim das Aflições – De Epicuro à ressurreição de César: ensaio sobre o Materialismo e a Religião Civil (The Garden of Afflictions – From Epicurus to the Resurrection of Caesar: An Essay on Materialism and Civil Religion) is a book by Brazilian writer Olavo de Carvalho, published in 1995.

O Jardim das Aflições along with the other works, A Nova Era e a Revolução Cultural (1994) and O Imbecil Coletivo (1996), make up a trilogy of what the author considers "combat works." On Amazon.com, it is listed among the top 100 bestsellers in the Politics and Social Sciences category, being the second most commercially significant book by the author on the platform.

The book inspired a film of the same name, O Jardim das Aflições, released in 2017.

== Synopsis ==
The book is an essay whose fundamental thesis is that the history of the West is marked by the idea of Empire. The expansion of the Empire's domains to the limits of the visible world is a permanent objective through successive attempts at restructuring, even under different guises. It is an original and disturbing book that, starting from the analysis of an apparently minor event, uses it as an occasion to show the connections between the small and the great, the everyday and the eternal, the mundane and the erudite, among other dichotomies, expanding in concentric circles to encompass, in a complex philosophy of history, the entire horizon of Western culture.

== Critical reception ==
The book's reading has been pointed out as challenging due to its winding language and dense text. Some critics considered the work to be a keen analysis of various movements that marked modernity and their reflections in today's world, in a text that provokes deeper reflection and observation of the reality of the contemporary world in the reader. While others considered the work a daring analysis of historical elements with a sensationalist appeal when invoking conspiracy theories. The book was included in the List of 100 books of the program "Expedições pelo mundo da cultura," by Prof. José Monir Nasser, ranked 12th, between The Red and the Black (Stendhal) and The Man without Qualities (Robert Musil), being one of the two Brazilian works listed (the other: Memórias Póstumas de Brás Cubas, by Machado de Assis).

Bruno Tolentino, in his preface, considered the work a rigorous and intriguing investigation of afflictions. For him, "(...) Olavo de Carvalho once again tells us loudly and clearly: enough of napping in the shadow of utopia and mental lethargy, it is more than time to wake up and spit... and think! As for me, where I left a country, thirty years later I found a depressing coupling of pedantry and show business, the joyful feast at the funeral ends—once more!—with this admirable book, our frightening portrait, O Jardim das Aflições. Let the dead bury their dead: make way, reader...". The Rio de Janeiro poet, upon receiving a copy of O Jardim das Aflições, is also said to have mentioned that the book's structure reminded him of the symphonies of the Finnish composer Jean Sibelius. Olavo stated that it was at Tolentino's insistence that he published the work in a larger print run by a professional publishing house, as at the time he only published his books for a small circle of students and friends.

Rodrigo Constantino disagreed with some points in the book, for example, he did not consider Epicurus' Garden to be the "Garden of Afflictions" and said he did not see any sense "(...) in the accusation that the Epicurean seeks the pleasures of the body in an uncontrolled manner". According to Joel Pinheiro da Fonseca, O jardim das aflições "(...) is a book without unity, which goes from a distressing attempt to refute Epicurus, denigrated as a "hypnotist" (an accusation that would make more sense if directed at Olavo himself) to the dangers of Neuro-linguistic Programming, a pseudoscience already discredited when the book was published. It also discusses Freemasonry, communism, esoteric currents, millenarianism. Supposedly, the central theme is the concept of empire in the West, but in practice, it is little more than the sensationalist application of conspiracy theories." Another disagreement is about the supposed refutation of Cantor's theorem that the philosopher made in the work, where critics considered it unsuccessful and pretentious, as the philosopher would not have understood the argument and even exceeded its scope.

Ronaldo Castro de Lima Junior emphasized that the book, "(...) despite its rich vocabulary, classical narrative, and ideas of almost vertiginous complexity, can be understood by those with relatively basic education. That is why it is a masterpiece." In a column in O Globo, Caetano Veloso made brief comments about O Jardim das Aflições, describing it as an "eloquent book against Epicurus" and writing that in it "Olavo disapproves of the pragmatists". Pedro Sette-Câmara, in Folha de S. Paulo, regarding the work: "I admired the attempt—especially because such undertakings are now ill-regarded—to encompass an object as vast as the history of the West. I admired the transition from journalistic style to philosophical argumentation, the variation between a humorous and mystical tone. It was what I expected, unoriginally, from an aesthetic virtue: the text was appealing because it served the subject."

Leopoldo Serran defined the book as "marvelous, a flash of light in the darkness". Josué Montello, of the ABL, considered having read few books with the same interest and gratitude. Vamireh Chacon praised the author's method and writing style, considering it concise, precise, and rigorous. According to Antonio Fernando Borges, "O jardim das aflições presents us with a scathing critique of the Brazilian intelligentsia, in its irresponsible march towards egalitarianism". Paulo Briguet (2017) wrote that "Reading a book like O Jardim das Aflições, published in 1995, is to find a prophetic panorama of all the tragicomedy experienced by Brazilian society in the last 20 years. The author described precisely the power project that completely undermined the cultural and spiritual basis of Brazil so that a criminal elite could reign over the country". According to Fabrício de Moraes, the book "demonstrates how the Empire, not being a theory but a reality, underlies all transformations and conflicts, even the most intense and antithetical ones."

In the author's note in the second edition of the book, two years after its release, Olavo de Carvalho considered that "despite the praises from Antonio Fernando Borges, Vamireh Chacon, Roberto Campos, Josué Montello, Herberto Sales, Leopoldo Serran, and many others," the book did not receive the attention from the public that O Imbecil Coletivo, published in 1996, received. The philosopher stated in the note that "if there is a book in which the author said everything he wanted to say, it is this one. I only repeat the appeal that the reader does not read it askew and jumping, but in the order of the chapters (...)". In the afterword of the third edition, he answers questions around the ideas present in the work and its relationship with the current sociopolitical scenario in the world.

== See also ==
- O Imbecil Coletivo
- O Mínimo Que Você Precisa Saber para Não Ser um Idiota
- O Jardim das Aflições
