= Caio Blinder =

Brazilian journalist, writer and TV presenter

- Born: Caio Kraiser Blinder; August 14, 1957; 68 years ago São Paulo, São Paulo, Brazil
- Education: University of Notre Dame; Ohio University
- Occupations: Journalist and writer
- Years active: 1976–present
- Website: caioblinder.com

Caio Kraiser Blinder (São Paulo, August 14, 1957) is a Brazilian journalist, writer and TV presenter. Blinder lives in New Jersey, where he has hosted GNT's Manhattan Connection since its inception in 1993. He is also a correspondent for Brazilian radio Jovem Pan, writes for the newspaper Diário de Notícias and for the Brazilian magazines Exame and Primeira Leitura. He has master's degrees in Latin American studies from Ohio University and International Relations from the University of Notre Dame. He taught International Relations at Indiana University and was a correspondent for the Brazilian newspaper Folha de S.Paulo. Blinder comes from a Jewish family and lives with his two daughters and his wife Alma, of Philippine origins. In his youth, he took part in the Jewish youth movement Chazit Hanoar, connected to the Congregação Israelita Paulista.

He wrote the book Terras Prometidas (Promised Lands), in which he reflects on various themes and their relation to Jews and the Jewish religion.

== Criticism ==
=== Offenses to Arab women ===
In April 2011, during a broadcast of the show Manhattan Connection, he called Queen Noor of Jordan, widow of King Hussein, and Queen Rania, wife of Abdullah II, "sluts" (piranha). He also used the word to describe one of the daughters-in-law of Hosni Mubarak, former President of Egypt, as well as Asma al-Assad, wife of President of Syria Bashar al-Assad, and Ameera al-Taweel, ex-wife of Al-Waleed bin Talal of Saudi Arabia. As a response, the Embassy of Jordan in Brazil sent a formal protest to the Brazilian Ministry of Foreign Relations. After Blinder's presentation, show editor-in-chief Lucas Mendes apologized for the offenses. Blinder later assumed responsibility for his words in the interview and apologized on air.

=== Defense of the assassination of Iranian scientists ===
In January 2012, on the Manhattan Connection program, Blinder justified the assassination of Iranian scientists for MEK and Jundallah as a way to avoid possible death, and to deter other scientists from working for Iran, which he called a "terrorist state".

== See also ==
- Criticism of Rede Globo
- BreadTube
