= Bonifácio: O Fundador do Brasil =

2018 film

- Directed by: Mauro Ventura
- Production company: IVIN Films
- Release date: June 6, 2018
- Country: Brazil
- Language: Portuguese

Bonifácio: O Fundador do Brasil (lit. 'Boniface: The Founder of Brazil') is a Brazilian documentary about the life, work and thoughts of the Patriarch of Independence of Brazil, José Bonifácio de Andrada e Silva. It is a production of IVIN Films.

It is directed by Mauro Ventura and the participation of personalities from Brazil and Portugal, such as Bertrand de Orléans e Bragança and Olavo de Carvalho.

It was the largest crowdfunding campaign in the history of Brazilian cinema.

It premiered on June 6, 2018, in cinemas in São Paulo, Rio de Janeiro and Porto Alegre.
