= Mauro Ventura =

Brazilian film director

Mauro Ventura (born in Rio de Janeiro in 1982) is a Brazilian film director.

== Filmography ==
He directed the 2018 documentary Bonifácio: O Fundador do Brasil, produced by IVIN Films. In the same year he directed Imbecil Coletivo, a short documentary about a book written in 1995 by Olavo de Carvalho.

In 2019 he directed Miracle (2019), with Olavo de Carvalho, Wolfgang Smith and Seyyed Hossein Nasr.

Finally, in 2020 he directed Alma Portuguesa, about the culture of Portugal.
