= Felipe Moura Brasil =

Brazilian journalist

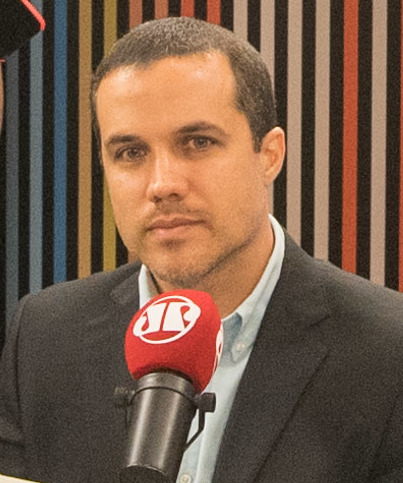
- Felipe Moura Brasil in 2019
- Born: Felipe Moura Brasil; May 18, 1981 (age 45); Rio de Janeiro, Brazil
- Occupations: writer; journalist; commentator; presenter; blogger
- Website: www.felipemourabrasil.com

Felipe Moura Brasil (born May 18, 1981) is a Brazilian writer, journalist, blogger, presenter and commentator.

== Biography ==
Felipe Moura Brasil was born in Rio de Janeiro on May 18, 1981.

=== 2010–2013 ===
Moura created Blog do Pim in 2010 in became a collaborator to the website Mídia Sem Máscara, created by Olavo de Carvalho.

In 2012, Moura started working as a translator and organizer of books for the publishing company Record, taking the initiative to organize the book of Olavo de Carvalho O Mínimo Que Você Precisa Saber para Não Ser um Idiota published in 2013, by Editora Record.

With the success of publications on his former Blog do Pim and other spaces, he was invited to be a blogger on the Veja magazine website, which was launched on December 2, 2013.

=== 2017–2020 ===
In April 2017, he announced his departure from Veja magazine. According to him, due to another work proposal and despite the insistence of the current company for his permanence.

In May 2017, he became part of O Antagonista. In June 2017, it was announced that he was hired at Radio Jovem Pan to lead, together with journalists Joice Hasselmann, Fernando Martins and Claudio Tognolli, the program Os Pingos nos Is.

In February 2018, after Hasselmann left, Felipe Moura Brasil took over as anchor of the station's afternoon program. His former post as commentator was assumed by fellow journalist José Maria Trindade, without any prior notice or explanations a posteriori by the broadcaster.

Felipe became the journalism director of Jovem Pan on February 20, 2019, and announced his departure from the website O Antagonista, but maintaining a biweekly column in Revista Crusoé.

In February 2020, he left Jovem Pan. In a statement, he said he chose not to renew his contract with the broadcaster.

=== 2020–present ===
In February 2020, the news of his return to the staff of journalists at O Antagonista was announced. Left the portal once again on February 17, 2021

The journalist hosted the show Salve, Salve BandNews on BandNews FM from Monday to Friday afternoons between 2020 and 2021. But in 2022, he decided not to renew his contract with the broadcaster and left. He is currently a columnist for UOL, Eldorado FM radio and Estadão.

On August 13, 2022, the journalist was hired by CNN Brazil to cover the elections in Brazil, in addition to contributing with political analysis on the news channel. He is currently also a presenter of the program CNN Arena.

== Political views ==
Moura supports economic liberalism with a minimal state as one of the solutions to fight corruption in Brazil.

== Reception ==
In October 2016, he was considered by a study by the Brazilian big data Stilingue, the biggest political influencer on Twitter in Brazil.

A survey conducted in 2017 by ePoliticSchool (EPS) listed him among the most influential social networks in relation to political issues.
