= Wolfgang Smith =

Austrian mathematician and philosopher of science (1930–2024)

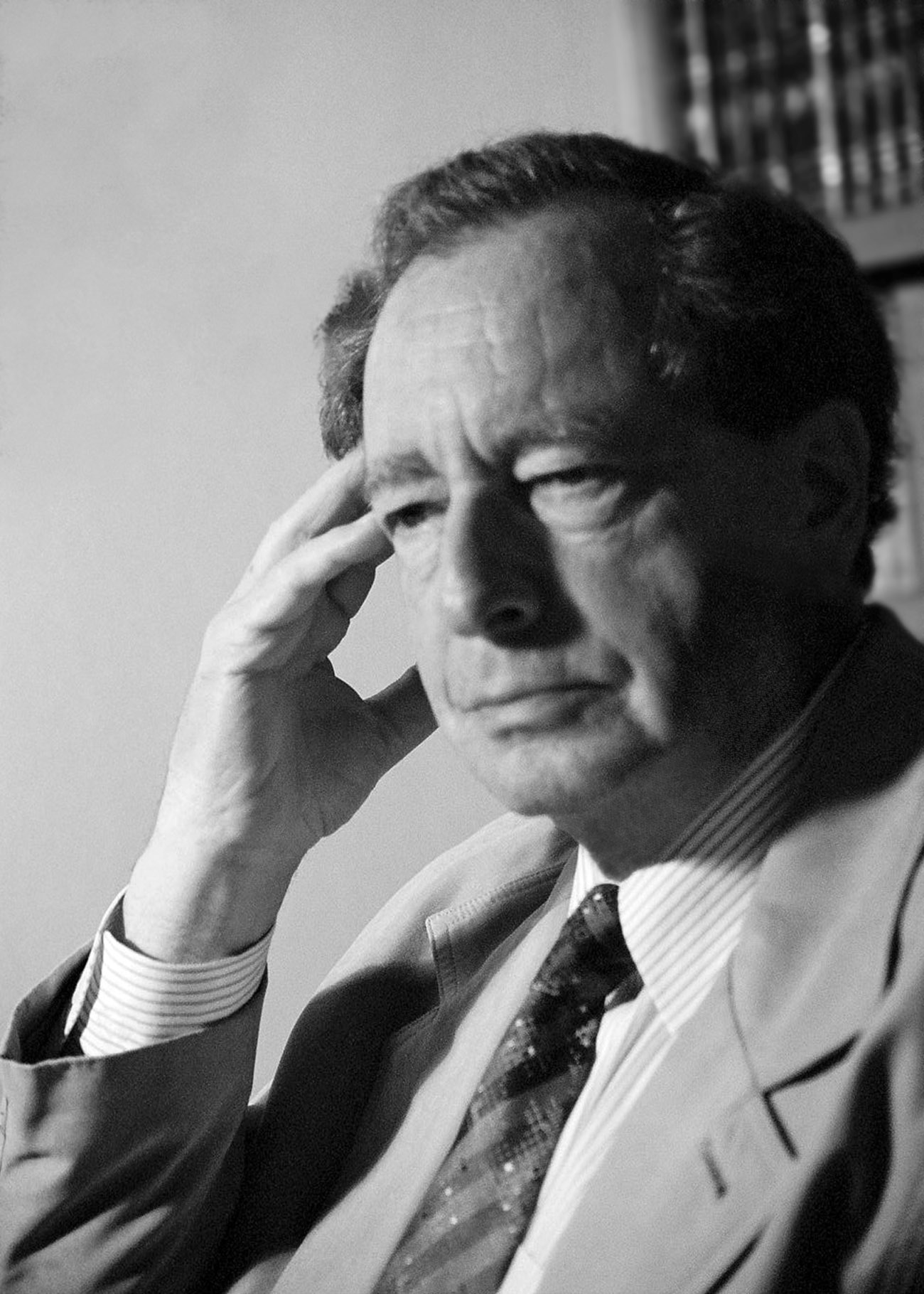
- Born: 18 February 1930; Vienna, Austria
- Died: 19 July 2024 (aged 94); Ventura, California, U.S.

Education
- Education: Cornell University (BS); Purdue University (MS); Columbia University (PhD)

Philosophical work
- Era: 20th-century philosophy
- Region: Western philosophy
- School: Realism, Platonism, Neoplatonism, Aristotelianism, Traditionalism
- Main interests: Metaphysics, Physics, Mathematics, Philosophy of science
- Notable ideas: Splitting the scientific method from the scientistic philosophy, showing how the former can be joined to a Thomistic-based ontological realism, assigning to many hard sciences a place in such an ontological hierarchy; distinction between the "corporeal world" and the "physical universe"; vertical causation; irreducible wholeness

Wolfgang Smith (February 18, 1930 – July 19, 2024) was an Austrian mathematician, physicist, philosopher of science, metaphysician, and member of the Traditionalist School. He wrote extensively in the field of differential geometry, as a critic of scientism and as a proponent of a new interpretation of quantum mechanics that draws heavily from premodern ontology and realism.

== Biography ==
Smith was born February 18, 1930, in Vienna. He graduated in 1948 from Cornell University with majors in philosophy, physics, and mathematics. Two years later he earned his M.S. in physics at Purdue University and ultimately his Ph.D. in mathematics at Columbia University.

He worked as an aerodynamicist at Bell Aircraft Corporation in the early 1950s, and during this time researched and published on the problem of atmospheric reentry. He was a mathematics professor at MIT, UCLA and Oregon State University, doing research in the field of differential geometry and publishing in academic journals such as the Transactions of the American Mathematical Society, the Proceedings of the National Academy of Sciences, the American Journal of Mathematics, and others. He retired from academic life in 1992.

In parallel with his academic duties, he developed philosophical inquiries in the fields of metaphysics and the philosophy of science, publishing in specialized journals such as The Thomist, Sacred Web: A Journal of Tradition and Modernity, and Sophia: The Journal of Traditional Studies.

Smith died in Ventura, California at the age of 94.

== Philosophical work ==
Smith was a member of the Traditionalist School of metaphysics, having contributed extensively to its criticism of modernity while exploring the philosophical underpinnings of the scientific method and emphasizing the idea of bringing science back into a Platonist and Aristotelian framework of traditional ontological realism.

Identifying with Alfred North Whitehead's critique of the "bifurcationism" and "physical reductionism" of scientism – i.e., the belief that, first, the qualitative properties of the objects of perception ("corporeal" objects) are ultimately distinct from their respective quantitative properties (the "physical" objects studied by the various sciences); and second, that physical objects are in fact all there is, meaning corporeal objects are reduced to their physical counterparts – Smith examines critically in his work Cosmos and Transcendence (1984) the Cartesian roots of modern science.

Proceeding with his critique of scientism in his monograph, The Quantum Enigma (1995), Smith raised the questions of whether the scientific method is in fact dependent on the scientistic philosophy and, if it is not, whether linking it to other philosophical frameworks would provide better solutions to the way physical phenomena are interpreted. Demonstrating that neither the scientific method nor its results require adhering to a scientistic metaphysics, he answered in the negative to the first question, resulting in the conclusion that it is possible to link the scientific method to any underlying ontology, or to none at all. Working then into the second question, he proposed linking the scientific method – and thus the modern sciences – to a non-bifurcationist, non-reductionist metaphysics in the form of a modified Thomistic ontology, showing how such a move resolves the apparent incoherences of quantum mechanics.

According to Smith, this interpretation of quantum mechanics allows for the usage of the hylomorphic concepts of potency and act to properly understand quantum superposition. For example, instead of considering that a photon is "simultaneously a wave and a particle" or "a particle in two distinct positions," one may consider that the photon (or any other physical object) at first does not exist in act, but only in potency; i.e., as "matter" in the hylomorphic meaning of the term, having the potential of becoming "a wave or a particle," or "of being here or there." Whether one of these outcomes will happen to this undifferentiated matter is dependent on the determination imposed upon it by the macroscopic corporeal object that provides its actualization. A photon, thus, would be no more strange for having many potentials than, say, an individual who has the "superposed" potentials of learning French and/or Spanish and/or Greek, all the while reading and/or walking and/or stretching his arms. A further consequence of this interpretation is that a corporeal object and its "associated physical object" are not dichotomized or reduced one to the other anymore but, on the contrary, altogether constitute a whole of which different aspects are dealt with depending upon perspective.

Smith's understanding of the relationship between corporeal and physical objects extends to his interpretation of biology, where he became an opponent of Darwinian evolution, as the fundamental element in a species would be its form, not its causal history, which evolutionists favor. This led him to be a supporter of the intelligent design movement, though his own hylomorphic approach is not widely adopted by mainstream intelligent design theorists (who, like evolutionists, also favor causal history, albeit differently).

Smith also took a stance towards a relativistic rehabilitation of geocentrism. He did not support a Ptolemaic or medieval geocentrism unequivocally, nor assert that heliocentrism is absolutely false. Rather, he argued that, according to the theory of relativity, both heliocentrism and geocentrism have scientific merit, insofar as scientific observation depends upon the reference frame of the observer. Consequently, any observations made from Earth (or any near-Earth satellites) are in effect geocentric.

== Filmography ==
Smith participated in Miracle (2019), a documentary by Mauro Ventura, with the participation of Raphael De Paola and Olavo de Carvalho.

The End of Quantum Reality (2020), a documentary film about Smith's life and thought, ran in a limited national theatrical release in the U.S.

== Select bibliography ==
=== Books ===
Cosmos and Transcendence: Breaking Through the Barrier of Scientistic Belief (1984)

Theistic Evolution: The Teilhardian Heresy (1988; originally published as Teilhardism and the New Religion)

The Quantum Enigma: Finding the Hidden Key (1995)

Ancient Wisdom and Modern Misconceptions: A Critique of Contemporary Scientism (2004; originally published as The Wisdom of Ancient Cosmology)

Christian Gnosis: From Saint Paul to Meister Eckhart (2008)

Science & Myth: With a Response to Stephen Hawking's The Grand Design (2012)

In Quest of Catholicity: Malachi Martin Responds to Wolfgang Smith (2016)

Physics and Vertical Causation: The End of Quantum Reality (2019)

The Vertical Ascent: From Particles to the Tripartite Cosmos and Beyond (2021)

Vedanta in Light of Christian Wisdom (2022)

Physics: A Science in Quest of an Ontology (2023)

=== Articles ===
==== General ====
Articles on philosophy, religion, physics and non-mathematical subjects in general:

- Iqbal, Muzaffar (January 2023). "Evolution, Causality, and Transcendental Truths: Wolfgang Smith in conversation with Muzaffar Iqbal". Islamic Sciences. 16 (1): 8–29. ISSN 1929-9435. OCLC 1645845.
- "Celestial Corporeality". Sophia: The Journal of Traditional Studies. 5 (1). Summer 1999. ISSN 1521-1231. OCLC 39708929.
- "The plague of scientistic belief". Homiletic and Pastoral Review. April 2000. ISSN 0018-4268. OCLC 5739991. Archived from the original on 2008-05-09.
- "The Extrapolated Universe". Sophia: The Journal of Traditional Studies. 6 (1). Summer 2000. ISSN 1521-1231. OCLC 39708929.
- "Eddington and the Primacy of the Corporeal". Sophia: The Journal of Traditional Studies. 6 (2). Winter 2000. ISSN 1521-1231. OCLC 39708929.
- "Science and Myth: the Hidden Connection" (PDF). Sophia: The Journal of Traditional Studies. 7 (1). Summer 2001. ISSN 1521-1231. OCLC 39708929.
- "The Pitfall of Astrophysical Cosmology". Sophia: The Journal of Traditional Studies. 7 (2). Winter 2001. ISSN 1521-1231. OCLC 39708929.
- "Esoterism and Cosmology: From Ptolemy to Dante and Cusanus". Sophia: The Journal of Traditional Studies. 8 (1). Summer 2002. ISSN 1521-1231. OCLC 39708929.
- "Modern Science and Guénonian Critique". Sophia: The Journal of Traditional Studies. 9 (2). Winter 2003. ISSN 1521-1231. OCLC 39708929.
- "The Enigma of Visual Perception". Sophia: The Journal of Traditional Studies. 10 (1). Summer 2004. ISSN 1521-1231. OCLC 39708929.
- "Neurons and Mind". Sophia: The Journal of Traditional Studies. 10 (2). Winter 2004. ISSN 1521-1231. OCLC 39708929.
- "Review of Journeys East, by Harry Oldmeadow". Sophia: The Journal of Traditional Studies. 11 (1). Summer 2005. ISSN 1521-1231. OCLC 39708929.
- "Rama P. Coomaraswamy 1929–2006: In Memoriam". Sophia: The Journal of Traditional Studies. 12 (2). Fall–Winter 2006. ISSN 1521-1231. OCLC 39708929.
- "Cosmology in the Face of Gnosis". Sophia: The Journal of Traditional Studies. 12 (2). Fall–Winter 2006. ISSN 1521-1231. OCLC 39708929.
- "Transcending the creatio ex nihilo: The Kabbalistic Exegesis". Sophia: The Journal of Traditional Studies. 13 (1). Spring–Summer 2007. ISSN 1521-1231. OCLC 39708929.
- "The Wisdom of Christian Kabbalah". Sophia: The Journal of Traditional Studies. 13 (2). Winter 2007–2008. ISSN 1521-1231. OCLC 39708929.

==== Mathematics ====
Academic articles on mathematics signed as "J. Wolfgang Smith":

- Smith, J. Wolfgang (June 1959). "On Integration of Quasi-Linear Parabolic Equations By Explicit Difference Methods". Transactions of the American Mathematical Society (fee required). 91 (3): 425–43. doi:10.2307/1993257. JSTOR 1993257. OCLC 1480369.
- Smith, J. Wolfgang (January 15, 1960). "Fundamental Groups on a Lorentz Manifold". Proceedings of the National Academy of Sciences. 46 (1): 111–114. Bibcode:1960PNAS...46..111S. doi:10.1073/pnas.46.1.111. JSTOR 70809. OCLC 43473694. PMC 285022. PMID 16590583.
- Smith, J. Wolfgang (May 1960). "Lorentz Structures on the Plane" (fee required). Transactions of the American Mathematical Society. 95 (2): 226–237. doi:10.2307/1993288. hdl:2027/mdp.39015095250620. JSTOR 1993288. OCLC 1480369.
- Smith, J. Wolfgang (October 1960). "Fundamental Groups on a Lorentz Manifold". American Journal of Mathematics (reprint, fee required). 82 (4): 873–890. doi:10.2307/2372946. JSTOR 2372946. OCLC 31863589.
- Clifton, Yeaton H; Smith, J. Wolfgang (February 15, 1961). "The Category of Topological Objects". Proceedings of the National Academy of Sciences. 47 (2): 190–195. Bibcode:1961PNAS...47..190C. doi:10.1073/pnas.47.2.190. JSTOR 70719. OCLC 43473694. PMC 221651. PMID 16590817.
- Clifton, Yeaton H.; Smith, J. Wolfgang (December 1962). "Topological Objects and Sheaves" (fee required). Transactions of the American Mathematical Society. 105 (3): 436–452. doi:10.2307/1993730. JSTOR 1993730. OCLC 1480369.
- Clifton, Yeaton H; Smith, J. Wolfgang (November 15, 1963). "The Euler Class as an Obstruction in the Theory of Foliations". Proceedings of the National Academy of Sciences. 50 (5): 949–954. Bibcode:1963PNAS...50..949C. doi:10.1073/pnas.50.5.949. JSTOR 71949. OCLC 43473694. PMC 221954. PMID 16591128.
- Smith, J. Wolfgang (1966). "The de Rham theorem for general spaces". Tohoku Mathematical Journal. 2nd. 18 (2): 115–137. doi:10.2748/tmj/1178243443. MR 0202154. OCLC 1642556. Zbl 0146.19402.
- Smith, J. Wolfgang (1968). "An exact sequence for submersions" (PDF). Bulletin of the American Mathematical Society. 74 (2): 233–237. doi:10.1090/S0002-9904-1968-11899-3. MR 0221512. OCLC 4672985.
- Smith, J. Wolfgang (1969). "Commuting vectorfields on open manifolds" (PDF). Bulletin of the American Mathematical Society. 75 (5): 1013–1017. doi:10.1090/S0002-9904-1969-12343-8. MR 0248867. OCLC 4672985. Zbl 0179.52002.
- Endicott, Patrick C; Smith, J Wolfgang (1980). "A homology spectral sequence for submersions" (PDF). Pacific Journal of Mathematics. 89 (2): 279–299. doi:10.2140/pjm.1980.89.279. ISSN 0030-8730. MR 0599121. OCLC 1761678. Zbl 0472.55015.
- Smith, J (1980). "Fiber homology and orientability of maps" (PDF). Pacific Journal of Mathematics. 89 (2): 453–470. doi:10.2140/pjm.1980.89.453. ISSN 0030-8730. MR 0599133. OCLC 1761678. Zbl 0467.55019.

== See also ==
- Quantum mechanics
- Interpretation of quantum mechanics
- List of American philosophers
- Perennial philosophy
- Philosophical realism
- Philosophy of physics
- Traditionalist School
