= The End of Quantum Reality =

The End of Quantum Reality is a documentary film about the life and thought of mathematician, physicist, and philosopher of science Wolfgang Smith.

Directed by Katheryne Thomas and produced by Rick DeLano, The End of Quantum Reality ran in a limited national theatrical release in the U.S. in early 2020.

The film was poorly received by some reviewers, with one noting it may "find interest in the more conspiracy-minded corners of Reddit, but others will struggle to make it through its opaque 86 minutes." Another review considered the film "wilfully impenetrable" and "baffling to anyone without a solid background in physics."
