= Diogo Mainardi =

Brazilian journalist and writer

- Born: Diogo Briso Mainardi; September 22, 1962 (age 64); São Paulo, Brazil
- Occupations: Columnist; writer; producer; screenwriter
- Awards: Prêmio Jabuti (1990)

Diogo Briso Mainardi (born September 22, 1962) is a Brazilian writer, producer, screenwriter, and journalist. He became widely known in Brazil for his weekly column in Veja magazine, where he wrote social and political commentary. He is a prominent critic of left-wing governments, particularly the administration of Luiz Inácio Lula da Silva, about whom he wrote the book Lula É Minha Anta (Lula Is My Idiot), a collection of his columns regarding the Mensalão scandal. He is the brother of filmmaker Vinícius Mainardi, who died in April 2021.

He is the founder of the news portal O Antagonista. In May 2018, Mainardi began writing weekly columns for the magazine Crusoé. On September 10, 2022, he announced he would no longer write for the portal, remaining only as a partner. Mainardi was a regular member of the talk show Manhattan Connection between 2003 and 2021, and again from 2023 to 2024.

== Biography ==
Son of advertising executive Enio Mainardi and translator Julia Mainardi, his parents lived on a kibbutz in Israel and returned to Brazil shortly before his birth, where he was born in the city of São Paulo. Diogo lived for over fourteen years in Venice, Italy. He then moved to Rio de Janeiro, but returned to live in Italy.

Mainardi attended the London School of Economics (LSE) but completed only his first year. In 1980, in London, England, he met Ivan Lessa, whom he considers, alongside Paulo Francis, his mentor. According to Mainardi, he dropped out of university to read the books Lessa recommended to him.

He is married to an Italian woman and has two sons. His eldest son has cerebral palsy due to a medical error during childbirth, which forced Mainardi to return to live in Brazil, in the city of Rio de Janeiro.

After Miguel Nicolelis' media presentation of the exoskeleton at the opening of the World Cup, at a cost of R$33 million in public funds, Mainardi pointed out that the principle of the exoskeleton had already been validated and demonstrated. One of the main questions concerned what Nicolelis had promised and what had actually been presented, given that the project had received R$33 million from the Federal Government without a public tender. Nicolelis, in response to Mainardi's observation, attempted to discredit the journalist, accusing him of being “misinformed”.

While still in Venice, working as a columnist for Veja magazine, he became a strong critic of the Workers' Party (PT) government, especially Luiz Inácio Lula da Silva, the party's main political figure. In his column in the magazine, Mainardi made controversial comments, mostly directed at the political class in general: ‘Brazil has no right-wing party, no left-wing party, nothing. It has a bunch of crooks who get together to steal.’

Diogo Mainardi was mentioned in an American diplomatic cable leaked by WikiLeaks and entitled ‘10RIODEJANEIRO32,’ which refers to a ‘private lunch’ on 2 February 2010, where he allegedly met with the American consul in Rio de Janeiro. According to the document, Diogo said at the time that his column proposing Marina Silva as the ideal candidate for vice president on José Serra's ticket in that year's presidential election was based on a lunch between him and the then-presidential candidate, who reportedly said that Marina was his ‘dream running mate.’

Mainardi claims to be an atheist. He frequently criticizes religion and mysticism in general, always presenting himself as a skeptic.

== Works ==
=== The column in Veja ===
When he began his weekly column in Veja magazine in 1999, Mainardi's main topics were literature and art.

The symbolic text indicative of this change is ‘Culture depresses me', a summary of his impressions of culture: "The culture pages did not provide a single topic worth ten minutes of unpretentious conversation at a restaurant table. The cultural environment has become accustomed to the idea that it has nothing relevant to add to reality. This role has come to be fulfilled mainly by economists, who cultivate a taste for controversy and paradox, generating the best discussions in society. As for culture, it has become a bluff."

=== TV ===
Mainardi joined the team of presenters on the Sunday programme Manhattan Connection, which was broadcast on the Globo News pay-TV channel (previously on GNT) until November 2020, later moving to TV Cultura and finally to BM&C News. Since joining in 2003, Mainardi only left in 2022 after resigning from the programme in 2021 due to a dispute with lawyer Kakay. He rejoined the programme when it was relaunched in November 2023.

=== Cinema ===
As a screenwriter, he wrote Dezesseis, Zero, Sessenta (1995) and Mater Dei (2000), filmed by his brother, filmmaker Vinícius Mainardi. According to Mainardi, his film did not use public funds: Mater Dei was financed by the Mainardi brothers themselves and by Brazilian businessman João Paulo Diniz. The film stars Carolina Ferraz, Dan Stulbach, and Gabriel Braga Nunes.

=== Bibliography ===
- Malthus (1989) – Winner of the Prêmio Jabuti in 1990;
- Arquipélago (1992);
- Polígono das Secas (1995);
- Contra o Brasil (1998);
- A Tapas e Pontapés (2004);
- Lula É Minha Anta (2007);
- A Queda (2012);
- Meus Mortos: um autorretrato (2025)

Diogo has also translated books into Portuguese, such as Italo Calvino's Le città invisibili, Gore Vidal's How I Do What I Do and Maybe Even Why, and Evelyn Waugh's A Handful of Dust. His works have been published in countries such as Italy, Norway, United States, Spain, and Germany.

=== Internet and radio ===
Mainardi participated in the coverage of the 2010 FIFA World Cup in South Africa, providing commentary on the Jovem Pan radio network.

Together with journalist Mário Sabino, he founded the news portal O Antagonista in 2015, which quickly became one of the most influential in the country. He left the site in 2022.

Together with comedian Danilo Gentili, he founded the Substack portal #NãoÉImprensa (#ItsNotthePress), which has over thirty thousand subscribers. Mainardi left the project at the end of 2024 to devote himself to literature.

== Style ==
In his texts, Mainardi attempts to bring together seemingly disparate themes in order to enrich the narrative and clarify his arguments. For example, in “Run, Diogo, run!”, Mainardi combines singer Caetano Veloso, the Iranian nuclear bomb, and Renaissance painter Titian with technical analyses of stock market investments to conclude, unexpectedly: “If the investment works out, I'll never write another article. If it goes wrong, I'll have to become a columnist in Bahia.”

Mainardi is aware of the artificiality of the procedure. So much so that, back in August 2000, he wrote “The illusion of meaning,” a text in which he blatantly uses this device. In the very first paragraph, he lists the topics of the chronicle, apparently without any apparent connection: "I don't even know where to start: Edgar Allan Poe, chicken burgers, Mobutu, the Filipino kidnapper, or human embryos. Perhaps it would be best to start with Senator Joe Lieberman, the Democratic Party's candidate for vice president of the United States.“ And, after discussing all of them, explaining the unexpected hidden connections, he concludes, not without irony: ”We are bombarded with news all the time. With a little luck, they end up establishing connections in our minds, which creates an illusion of meaning, as happened to me this week. Due to a lack of space, I was unable to talk about the Filipino hijacker, but I swear it had something to do with Poe."

== Polemics ==
In 2014, he was one of those named on the Blacklist of the Workers' Party, the name given to a list of people mentioned in an article by the then vice-president of the Workers' Party, Alberto Cantalice, entitled “The demoralization of the pitbulls of the mainstream media”, In addition to Mainardi, the list included Reinaldo Azevedo, Augusto Nunes, Danilo Gentili, Lobão, Arnaldo Jabor, Marcelo Madureira, Guilherme Fiuza, and Demétrio Magnoli, calling them “elitists” and accusing them of being against the poor and fomenting hatred.

In October 2014, during a broadcast of Manhattan Connection following the re-election of Dilma Rousseff, Mainardi caused controversy by describing the population of the Northeastern region of Brazil as "regressive," "bovine," and "under-educated."

This election is proof that Brazil is a thing of the past. It's not Bolsa Família, it's not marketing. The Northeast has always been backward, always pro-government, always bovine, always subordinate during the military dictatorship, then under the reign of the PFL, and now with the PT. It is a backward region, poorly educated, poorly instructed, which has great difficulty modernizing its language. The free press only exists from the middle of Brazil downwards. Everything that represents modernity is on the other side.

Despite the content and scope of his remarks, the journalist later apologized, claiming that he did not mean to “blame the victim of manipulation, but rather those who practice it.”

== See also ==
- Manhattan Connection
- O Antagonista
- Veja
