= Juan Alfredo César Müller =

Argentine psychologist, translator

Juan Alfredo César Müller (June 29, 1927, in Buenos Aires – July 1, 1990, in São Paulo) was an Argentine psychologist and translator.

He attended the C. G. Jung Institute in Zurich, studying under Carl Jung, Leopold Szondi, and Marie-Louise von Franz. He later applied to the Regional Council of Psychology of São Paulo.

Müller settled in São Paulo in 1952 and delivered, in 1979, the first university extension course in Astrology for graduates in Psychology at the Pontifical Catholic University of São Paulo, with the collaboration of Olavo de Carvalho.

== Works ==
Müller rendered into Portuguese the book Introduction to the psychology of fate, by L. Szondi, which contains biographical data compiled by Pedro Balázs, both disciples of L. Szondi.
