= O Antagonista =

Brazilian journalism website

- Website type: News
- Available in: Portuguese
- Founded: January 1, 2015
- Creators: Diogo Mainardi; Mário Sabino
- Website: oantagonista.com.br
- Commercial: Yes
- Registration: Optional
- Launched: January 1, 2015; 11 years ago
- Current status: Active

O Antagonista is a Brazilian independent investigative journalism website aligned with the political right.

== History ==
O Antagonista was created by journalists Diogo Mainardi and Mário Sabino on January 1, 2015.

In August 2015, journalist Claudio Dantas joined as a third collaborating member. In May 2017, Felipe Moura Brasil became part of the team. According to his journalists, his proposal is to give priority to opinions contrary to what they define as "political, economic and cultural protagonism", as the name of the portal indicates.

The site also featured special collaborations such as those with deceased journalist Sandro Vaia, eventually publishing videos by presenter Danilo Gentili.

In March 2016, fifty percent of O Antagonista was purchased by the financial publishing company Empiricus Research.

In February 2020, Felipe Moura returned O Antagonista, after leaving the site to take over Jovem Pan.

== Controversies ==
In 2016, former President Luiz Inácio Lula da Silva registered four complaints that became inquiries at the 17th Ipiranga Police Station, in São Paulo. Among the requests is the investigation of alleged crimes committed by journalists from O Antagonista and Veja magazine. Lula's defense said that "websites appear to exist only to attack the honor and image of the ex-president".

In April 2017, journalist Paulo Henrique Amorim published on his blog Conversa Afiada a dialogue that took place when Marcelo Odebrecht was turning state's evidence. In the dialogue, Marcelo's lawyer reports to judge Sergio Moro that O Antagonista would be broadcasting a livestream of the testimony on his website. This, according to him, would undermine the private condition of the procedure determined by Moro.

On April 15, 2019, Minister of the Supreme Federal Court Alexandre de Moraes ordered that a report made by O Antagonista and Revista Crusoé referring to a supposed relationship between Dias Toffoli and Marcelo Odebrecht be removed under penalty of daily fine, if not removed, of 100 thousand reais. The decision to censor the magazine's content caused criticism by organs that defend freedom of the press and expression, such as the National Association of Newspapers (ANJ), the National Association of Magazine Editors (ANER), the Brazilian Association of Investigative Journalism ( ABRAJI) the Brazilian Press Association (ABI) and Transparency International. The Association of Federal Judges of Brazil (AJUFE) also repudiated the decision of Minister Alexandre de Moraes, which they considered "inadmissible". Later, Alexandre de Moraes reversed his decision and revoked his own act.

== See also ==
- Censorship in Brazil
