= Rose Ganguzza =

American film producer

Rose Ganguzza is a New York City based producer, with over 30 years of experience in the entertainment industry. In 2014 she founded Rose Pictures, a production company specializing in independent film and long and short form television.

== Production work ==
She is credited as producer for the 2013 film Kill Your Darlings.

She received the title of "Godmother of NY Independent film" by the Herald de Paris.

She produces talent within New York City, because she says it “creates jobs and stimulates the economy, but it also keeps New York’s creative juices flowing”

She is working on the production of Fatima (2017), a movie exploring the Miracle of Fatima, to be directed by Marco Pontecorvo.

== Personal life ==
Rose Ganguzza graduated from Immaculate Heart Academy 1966 and holds a master's degree in International Affairs from Columbia University. She is the mother of director and producer Antonio Campos and is married to Brazilian born TV journalist Lucas Mendes.
