= O Terceiro Travesseiro =

Novel by Nelson Luiz de Carvalho

The Third Pillow
- Cover of The Third Pillow
- Author: Nelson Luiz de Carvalho
- Original title: O Terceiro Travesseiro
- Language: Portuguese
- Series: O Terceiro Travesseiro series
- Genre: threesome, erotic, romance, adult, bisexuality
- Publisher: Edições GLS
- Publication date: 1998
- Publication place: Brazil
- Media type: Print e-Book; Audio Book
- Pages: 208
- ISBN: 978-85-86755-43-9
- Followed by: O Dia Seguinte

O Terceiro Travesseiro (Portuguese pronunciation: [u teʁˈsejɾu tɾɐviˈsejɾu]) is an erotic-adult gay-romance novel by author Nelson Luiz de Carvalho. It is the first book of the O Terceiro Travesseiro series, and introduces sixteen-year-old Marcus, who falls in love with Renato. The novel is followed by O Dia Seguinte.

It was published originally in hardback in 1998, and was the biggest selling book of 2007. It has been translated into 37 different languages.

A film adaptation of O Terceiro Travesseiro was released in 2012.

== Synopsis ==
=== Plot summary ===
O Terceiro Travesseiro covers the true story of a love triangle formed by three youths - two boys and a girl. Marcus is a teenager who finds himself hopelessly in love with Mr Renato, who soon ends up delivering also the passion, which is disturbed by the appearance of Beatrice in their lives (and relationship). The relationship intensifies and the three decide to share the same apartment, the same bed and even love. However, in the first day of this new life, Renato dies in a car accident and leaves Marcus in a fight like no other.

=== Main characters ===
- Marcus
- Renato
- Beatriz

== Reception ==
O Terceiro Travesseiro has sold over 200,000 copies and will soon be launched in Japan.

The book is the discovery of homosexuality. Despite the uncertainties and fear of rejection by family and society, the two become involved, embarking on an intense relationship, full of discoveries sexual and romantic, parties, travel. And soon discover the need to face the prejudice from family, friends and society. A fateful event, however, transforms forever the life of Marcus passes the rest of his life waiting for "a miracle that never happened."

== Adaptations ==
=== Theater ===
In 2005, the book was made into a stage production directed by Regiana Antonini. It ran for four months in the respective years. The script was not fully aligned with the book.

The author intends to soon launch a new stage version, with new producers, new direction and a new script written by himself close the book.

=== Film ===
O Terceiro Travesseiro was adapted into a film by Imagem Filmes. The film was directed by Alexandre Ziul and stars Cláudio Heinrich and Pedro Andrade as protagonists Marcus and Renato, respectively. The movie will be released in theaters in the Brazil on March 19, and on DVD on November 23, 2012.

== Sequel ==
Initially, O Terceiro Travesseiro had about 400 pages, but launching a book of this size is very expensive, so the author divided the book into two parts of 200 pages. The second part is stored, is called O Dia Seguinte and is still to be published.
