= Manhattan Connection =

Brazilian talk show

Manhattan Connection is a Brazilian talk show, aired from 1993 to 2021, then back in 2023. It was created and anchored by journalist Lucas Mendes. The program is taped in New York and was originally broadcast in Brazil on GNT channel, part of Globosat. In 2011, Manhattan Connection moved to the Globo News channel, also part of the Globo cable system. The last episode on Globo News was aired on 22 November 2020. The program was scheduled to return in January 2021, this time on TV Cultura

Manhattan Connection is one of the longest running news talk shows in Brazilian history. It consistently ranks among the highest on its channel's ratings list.

In its first phase, the participants were Paulo Francis, Caio Blinder and Nelson Motta. Mendes and Blinder have continue their participation from New York. There were three other participants: Diogo Mainardi from Venice, Ricardo Amorim from São Paulo, and Pedro Andrade, who alternates between New York and Miami. Angelica Vieira, the executive producer, has been with the program since its inception. It has since been among the top three in ratings on the network. The program is in Portuguese and divided into three segments - politics, economics, and cultural events around the world and is aired in 116 countries. In its last version, the public speaker and former Google executive, Sil Curiati, joined the team to talk about technology and innovation. She participates from New York, as well as the new producer, Bruno Corano.
