= Christine (2016 film) =

2016 film directed by Antonio Campos

- Theatrical release poster
- Directed by: Antonio Campos
- Written by: Craig Shilowich
- Produced by: Craig Shilowich; Melody C. Roscher
- Starring: Rebecca Hall; Michael C. Hall; Tracy Letts; Maria Dizzia; J. Smith-Cameron; John Cullum; Timothy Simons; Kim Shaw; Morgan Spector
- Cinematography: Joe Anderson
- Edited by: Sofia Subercaseaux
- Music by: Danny Bensi; Saunder Jurriaans
- Production companies: Great Point Media; BorderLine Films; Fresh Jade; The Wonder Club
- Distributed by: The Orchard (United States); Curzon Artificial Eye (United Kingdom); Universal Pictures (International)
- Release dates: January 23, 2016 (Sundance); October 14, 2016 (United States); January 27, 2017 (United Kingdom)
- Running time: 119 minutes
- Countries: United States; United Kingdom
- Language: English
- Box office: $313,465

Christine is a 2016 independent biographical psychological drama film directed by Antonio Campos and written by Craig Shilowich. The film stars Rebecca Hall as Christine Chubbuck, a news reporter who was the first person to die by suicide on a live television broadcast. Michael C. Hall, Tracy Letts, Maria Dizzia, J. Smith-Cameron, and John Cullum appear in supporting roles.

Christine had its world premiere at the Sundance Film Festival on January 23, 2016, where it was nominated for the Grand Jury Prize. The film was theatrically released in the United States on October 14, 2016, to positive reviews, with particular praise for Hall's performance.

== Plot ==
In 1974, Christine Chubbuck, a television reporter in Sarasota, Florida, struggles with stress personally and professionally. While she's cultivating a crush on co-worker George Peter Ryan, her doctor tells her she needs to have an ovary removed, which will decrease the likelihood of her ever conceiving a child. Her boss, Michael wants her to focus less on the human-interest pieces she prefers, and more on crime, which brings in news ratings. The station's owner intends to promote some of the Sarasota team with a move to Baltimore.

Eager to earn the promotion, Christine buys a police scanner hoping to find grittier stories. Though her co-workers praise her work, Michael disapproves. Christine proposes a piece combining documentary and recreation but Michael rejects it, telling Christine her segment will be replaced, resulting in a screaming match. Christine begins to have increasingly negative mood shifts, noticed only by her supportive colleague Jean.

Christine goes to a restaurant with George and they confide personal secrets. George takes Christine to a Transactional Analysis self-help group where Christine reveals she is a virgin but desperately wants a husband and a biological child. George takes Christine to her home and tells her he is being promoted to the Baltimore team. Christine drives to the home of station owner Bob Anderson, faking a flat tire so she can discuss the Baltimore promotions. Anderson reveals George asked for Andrea, the sports anchor, to be transferred with him, which devastates Christine.

Michael gives Christine permission to do another segment and she reads out several minutes of local news. When footage of a crime scene jams and she is asked to stall, she shrugs it off. She announces that the station will be airing a live suicide attempt, pulls out a revolver, and shoots herself in the head. She is taken to the hospital, where she dies.

Jean puts together Christine's news clippings and forms them into a memorial segment before leaving work. Once at home, Jean pulls an ice cream container from the freezer and turns on the television, changing the station from an evening news segment to The Mary Tyler Moore Show. Fighting back inevitable tears, Jean begins to sing along to the theme song and eat her ice cream, a tactic she earlier told Christine she uses as a way of coping with sadness.

== Cast ==
- Rebecca Hall as Christine Chubbuck
- Michael C. Hall as George Peter Ryan
- Tracy Letts as Michael Nelson (a fictional version of WXLT-TV owner Bob Nelson)
- Maria Dizzia as Jean Reed
- J. Smith-Cameron as Peg Chubbuck
- John Cullum as Bob Anderson
- Timothy Simons as Steve Turner
- Kim Shaw as Andrea Kirby
- Morgan Spector as Dr. Parsons

== Screenplay ==
Craig Shilowich came up with the idea for Christine after coming across articles online that highlighted Chubbuck's story. He was "instantly fascinated" with it and what drove her to choose death by suicide on television. Shilowich had endured his own struggles with depression while at NYU in the wake of 9/11. He eventually dropped out of school. "I'd spend days on end walking my room, peering out of the window, just to not have to deal with anybody," he told The Canadian Press in an interview. The depression lasted for about seven years and he says it went away the same way it came, with little explanation. He saw his story in Chubbuck's pre-suicide struggle and found himself "trying to piece it together" in a screenplay. He interviewed some of her former newsroom colleagues and read news stories to build what he could with hard facts. The rest was imagined.

== Production ==
In May 2015, it was announced that Rebecca Hall, Michael C. Hall, Tracy Letts, Maria Dizzia, and J. Smith-Cameron had been cast in the film. Antonio Campos was signed to direct from a screenplay by producer Shilowich. Melody C. Roscher also produced, with Borderline Films' Josh Mond and Sean Durkin as executive producers.

== Release ==
In December 2015, the first promotional image of Rebecca Hall was released on Indiewire.com. In January 2016, The Hollywood Reporter released more stills from the film. The film had its world premiere at the 2016 Sundance Film Festival on January 23, 2016. Shortly after, The Orchard acquired distribution rights to the film. The film was screened at the Toronto International Film Festival on September 8, 2016 and the BFI London Film Festival on October 6, 2016. The film was released on October 14, 2016. It was released in the United Kingdom on January 27, 2017, with the UK Blu-Ray releasing on February 27, 2017. No Blu-Ray has been announced for the United States; however, a DVD was released February 14, 2017.

== Reception ==
=== Critical response ===
Christine received positive reviews from film critics, praising Rebecca Hall's performance. On review aggregator website Rotten Tomatoes, the film has an approval rating of 88% based on 129 reviews, with an average rating of 7.30/10. The site's critical consensus reads, "Rising on the strength of Rebecca Hall's gripping performance, Christine offers an empathetic look at its subject's public career and painful private life." On Metacritic, the film has a score of 72 out of 100 score, based on 32 critics, indicating "generally favorable" reviews.

Guy Lodge of Variety gave the film a positive review, writing: "Far from the austere death march it might threaten to be on paper, this is a thrumming, heartsore, sometimes viciously funny character study, sensitive both to the singularities of Chubbuck’s psychological collapse and the indignities weathered by any woman in a 1970s newsroom. Invigorated by a top-drawer ensemble, with Rebecca Hall discomfitingly electric in the best role she’s yet been offered, this should easily become Campos’ most widely distributed work to date." David Rooney of The Hollywood Reporter also gave the film a positive review writing: "On the evidence presented here, Chubbuck reads as dour and almost scarily intense on camera, so her professional aptitude is questionable even if her dedication is not. But Hall makes it impossible to look away from this portrait of a woman brought to the heartbreaking conclusion that she's beyond hope."

=== Accolades ===
List of awards and nominations
Award	Date of ceremony	Category	Recipient(s)	Result	Ref.
Chicago Film Critics Association	December 15, 2016	Best Actress	Rebecca Hall	Nominated	
Chicago International Film Festival	October 27, 2016	Silver Hugo Award for Best Actress	Rebecca Hall	Won	
Deauville American Film Festival	September 11, 2016	Grand Special Prize	Antonio Campos	Nominated	
Detroit Film Critics Society	December 19, 2016	Best Actress	Rebecca Hall	Nominated	
Dorian Awards	January 26, 2017	Unsung Film of the Year	Christine	Won	
Houston Film Critics Society	January 6, 2017	Best Actress	Rebecca Hall	Nominated	
Independent Spirit Awards	February 25, 2017	Best First Screenplay	Craig Shilowich	Nominated	
Independent Spirit Awards	February 25, 2017	Piaget Producers Award	Melody C. Roscher and Craig Shilowich	Nominated	
IndieWire Critics Poll	December 19, 2016	Best Actress	Rebecca Hall	7th Place	
London Film Critics' Circle	January 22, 2017	British/Irish Actress of the Year	Rebecca Hall	Nominated	
Los Angeles Film Critics Association	December 4, 2016	Best Actress	Rebecca Hall	Runner-up	
Sundance Film Festival	January 31, 2016	Grand Jury Prize: Dramatic	Antonio Campos	Nominated	
Toronto Film Critics Association	December 11, 2016	Best Actress	Rebecca Hall	Runner-up	
Women Film Critics Circle	December 19, 2016	Best Movie about Women	Christine	Nominated	
Women Film Critics Circle	December 19, 2016	Best Actress	Rebecca Hall	Nominated	
Women Film Critics Circle	December 19, 2016	Courage in Acting	Rebecca Hall	Won	
Women Film Critics Circle	December 19, 2016	Karen Morley Award	Christine	Nominated	
Women Film Critics Circle	December 19, 2016	The Invisible Woman Award	Rebecca Hall	Nominated	
