= Antonio Campos (director) =

American film producer, screenwriter and film director

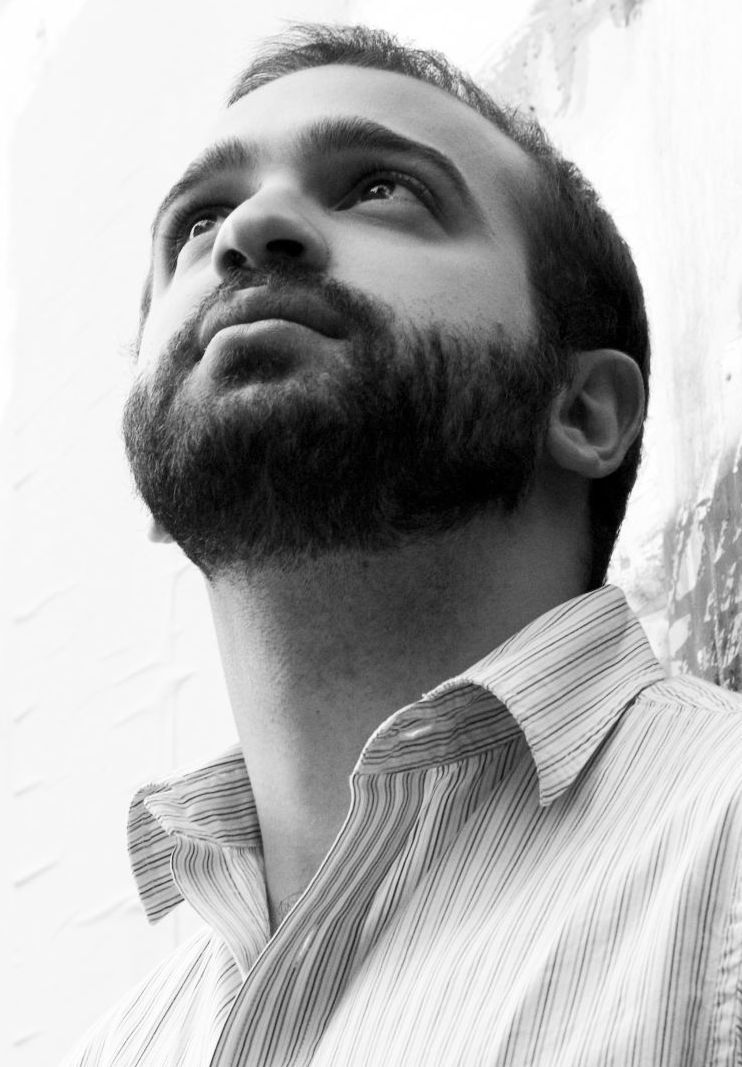
- Campos in September 2008
- Born: August 24, 1983 (age 43); New York City, New York, United States
- Occupations: Filmmaker, producer
- Years active: 2002–present
- Spouse: Sofía Subercaseaux (m. 2015)
- Children: 1
- Parents: Lucas Mendes (father); Rose Ganguzza (mother)
- Relatives: Paulo Campos (brother)

Antonio Campos (born August 24, 1983) is a Brazilian-American filmmaker and producer best known for directing such films as Afterschool (2008), Simon Killer (2012), Christine (2016), and The Devil All the Time (2020).

Campos is also known for creating the Max biographical drama crime series The Staircase (2022). Its two leads were nominated for Emmy Awards as were the production, writing and other categories.

== Early life ==
Campos was born in New York City. His father is Brazilian journalist Lucas Mendes, while his mother is American producer, Rose Ganguzza. His maternal grandparents were Italian. In 2002, he was named a Presidential Scholar of the Arts as part of the U.S. Presidential Scholars Program. He is also a YoungArts alumnus.

== Career ==
Campos made his feature-length debut on Afterschool, which had its world premiere at the Cannes Film Festival. The film was later acquired by IFC Films. It was released in a limited release on October 2, 2009. Campos then went on to direct Simon Killer. The film stars Brady Corbet and had its world premiere at the Sundance Film Festival. IFC Films acquired distribution rights to the film, and opened in a limited release in April 2013.

Campos's third feature, Christine, which starred Rebecca Hall, had its world premiere at the Sundance Film Festival. The film was acquired by The Orchard, and released in a limited release on October 14, 2016. Campos was attached to direct a prequel to The Omen for 20th Century Fox. Campos directed the pilot episode of The Sinner, starring Jessica Biel and Christopher Abbott, and also served as an executive producer. The pilot was later ordered to series. He also directed episode 8 of Marvel's The Punisher. In 2020, Campos wrote and directed the psychological thriller The Devil All the Time, which was released in September on Netflix. In 2025, Campos directed 4 episodes of the Netflix show The Beast In Me.

Apart from being a director and screenwriter, Campos cofounded the production company Borderline Films, which has produced films such as James White, Katie Says Goodbye, and Martha Marcy May Marlene. In October 2022, it was announced that Campos had been hired as showrunner for an untitled Matt Reeves-produced series set in Arkham Asylum, in addition to serving as director and an executive producer. In December 2023, James Gunn, CEO of DC Studios, confirmed the series would take place in the DC Universe. In July it reached that the show was no longer happening with Campos at the helm.

== Filmography ==
=== Short film ===
| Year | Title | Director | Writer | Producer | Notes |
|---|---|---|---|---|---|
| 2002 | Pandora | Yes | Yes | Yes | Also actor |
| 2006 | Doris | No | No | Yes | |
| 2007 | The Last 15 | Yes | Yes | Yes | Also editor |
| 2010 | Mary Last Seen | No | No | Yes | |
| 2010 | Kids in Love | No | No | Yes | |
| 2013 | Karaoke! | No | No | Yes | Also actor (As "Simon K.") |
| 2013 | 1009 | No | No | Yes | |
| 2014 | Tzniut | No | No | Executive | |

=== Feature film ===
| Year | Title | Director | Writer | Notes |
|---|---|---|---|---|
| 2005 | Buy It Now | Yes | Yes | Also editor and producer |
| 2008 | Afterschool | Yes | Yes | Also editor |
| 2012 | Simon Killer | Yes | Yes | |
| 2016 | Christine | Yes | No | |
| 2020 | The Devil All the Time | Yes | Yes | |

Producer

- Martha Marcy May Marlene (2011)
- James White (2015)
- Piercing (2018)

Executive producer

- Two Gates of Sleep (2010)
- The Eyes of My Mother (2016)
- Katie Says Goodbye (2016)

=== Television ===
| Year | Title | Director | Writer | Executive Producer | Notes |
|---|---|---|---|---|---|
| 2017 | The Punisher | Yes | No | No | Episode: "Cold Steel" |
| 2017–2018 | The Sinner | Yes | No | Yes | 5 episodes |
| 2020 | Homemade | Yes | Yes | No | Episode: "Annex" |
| 2022 | The Staircase | Yes | Yes | Yes | 6 episodes |
| 2025 | The Beast in Me | Yes | No | Yes | 8 episodes |
| 2026 | Count My Lies | Yes | No | No | TBA |
