= Ricardo Amorim =

Brazilian economist

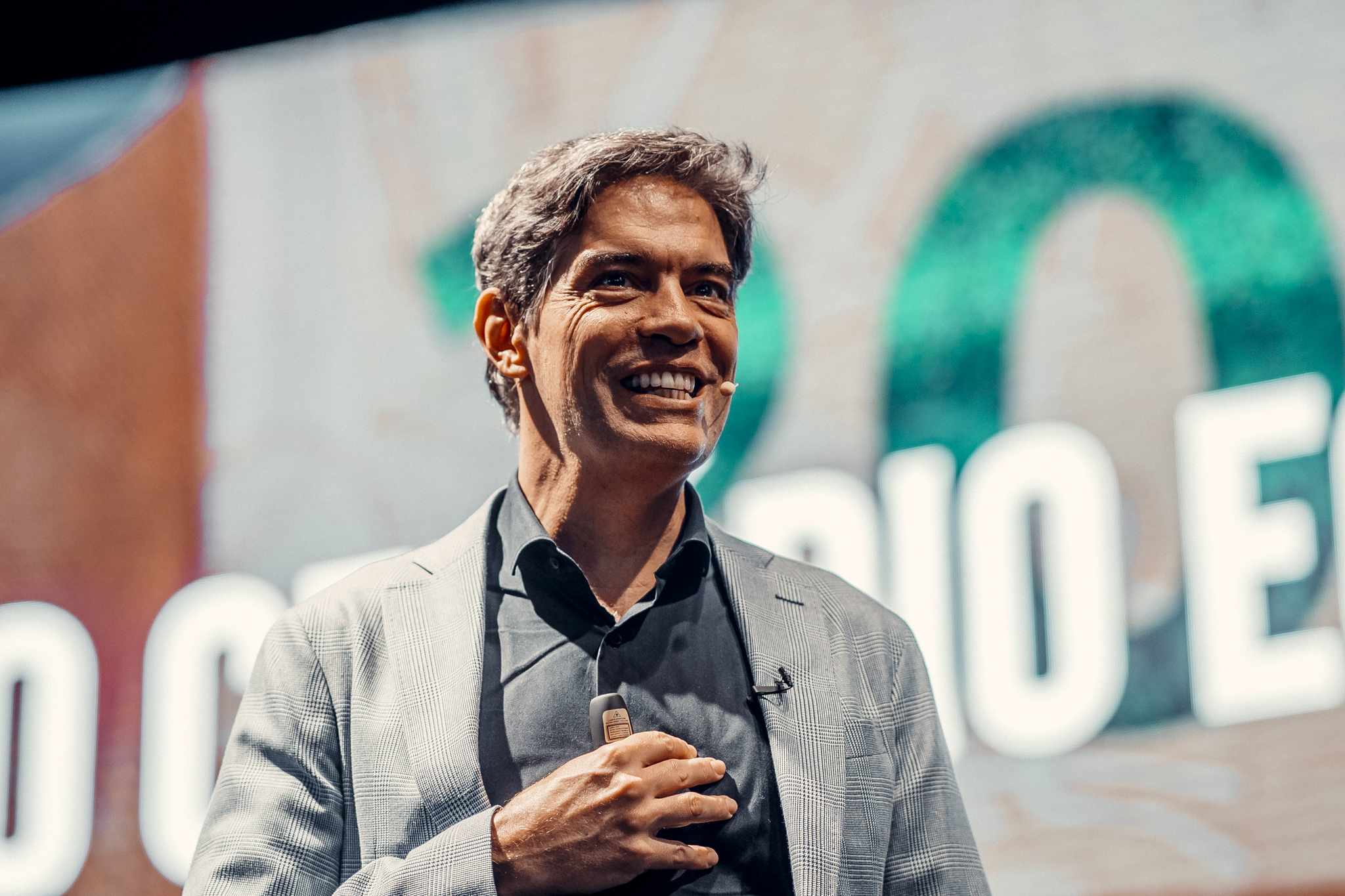
A picture of Ricardo Amorim Economist

Ricardo Amorim is a Brazilian economist. He was described as "Brazil's "most influential economist" by Forbes magazine.

Amorim is the author of After the Storm. He is a former host of Manhattan Connection at Globonews, the only Brazilian among the lecturers at Speakers Corner and the winner of the “Most Admired in the Economy, Business and Finance Press”.

Winner of the iBest Award for best contest of Brazil in 2020 and 2021 on three differents categories: Economy and Business, Linkedin Influencer and Opinion and Citizenship.

== Career ==
Amorim holds a B.A. in economics from the University of São Paulo and conducted graduate work in International Finance and Business at ESSEC Business School in Paris.

He is one of the hosts of the roundtable TV show Manhattan Connection on GloboNews, and is an economics and financial markets columnist at ISTOÉ Magazine.

== Awards and recognition ==
In 2015, he was included by Forbes in its list of the "100 most influential Brazilians".
