= O Mínimo Que Você Precisa Saber para Não Ser um Idiota =

2013 book by Olavo de Carvalho

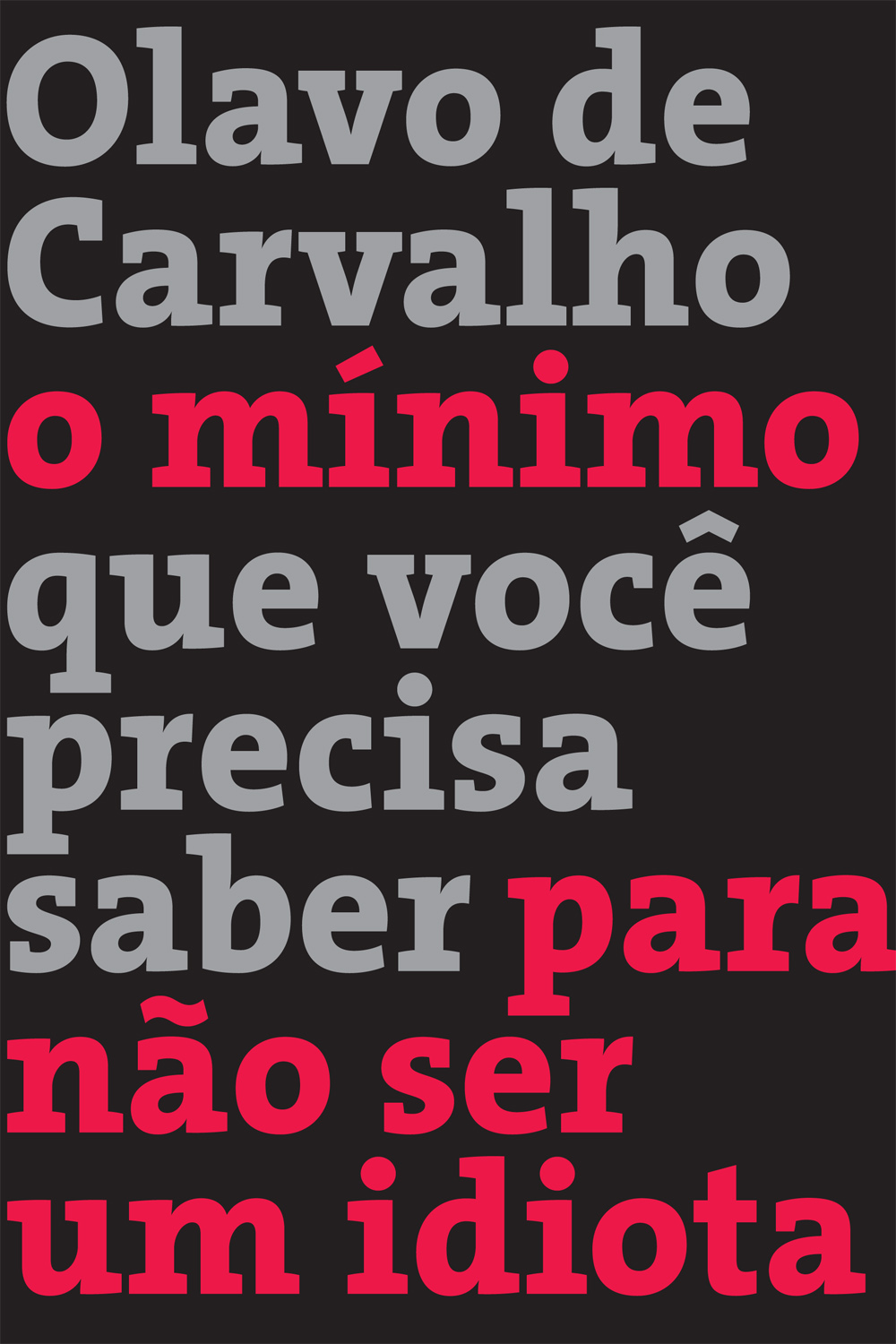
- Author: Olavo de Carvalho
- Language: Brazilian Portuguese
- Subject: social sciences, political science
- Genre: non-fiction
- Publisher: Record
- Publication date: 13 August 2013
- Pages: 616
- ISBN: 9788501402516

O Mínimo Que Você Precisa Saber para Não Ser um Idiota (a free translation into English: The Minimum You Need to Know to Not Be an Idiot) is a book by the Brazilian self-proclaimed philosopher Olavo de Carvalho, edited by Brazilian journalist Felipe Moura Brasil, and published by Editora Record in 2013. The book is a collection of 193 articles and essays written between 1997 and 2013 that were published in the Brazilian press.

== Content ==
The book is divided into 25 chapters or broad themes, which are further broken down into subtopics. Among the topics covered are knowledge, youth, intelligence, religion, science, socialism, envy, and abortion, as well as conspiracy theories. The book sparked attacks on educator Paulo Freire.

== Reception ==
In 2015, the book reached the milestone of 400,000 copies sold. In 2018, the book was reprinted. According to a report by Lauro Jardim for the newspaper O Globo until 2019, the book sold 400,000 copies.

Brazil's former president, Jair Bolsonaro (PSL), in his first remarks after his victory, in October 2018, delivered from his home via a live broadcast on social media, displayed a copy of the book alongside three others: the 1988 Brazilian Federal Constitution, the Bible, and Winston Churchill's The Second World War.

Following a change in leadership at Editora Record, where Rodrigo Lacerda took over as executive editor in January 2018, replacing Carlos Andreazza, who had edited the book’s first editions, in 2021, the publisher decided not to renew a new wave of book releases by Olavo de Carvalho.

=== Critcal ===
Journalist Reinaldo Azevedo, writing for Veja magazine, praised the book launch and noted that “He manages, like no other author in Brazil, whether you like him or not, to lend philosophical dignity to everyday life, without ever trivializing thought. This does not mean that he does not navigate, and his detractors do not criticize him any less for this; on the contrary, with mastery in the realms of theory and history.”

Luís Antônio Giron, writing for Época magazine, offered a mixed review of the book and wrote that “In a way, Olavo advocates a return to Latin, rote memorization, and the palmatoria to instill some culture in the horde of ignoramuses that populate Brazil. I actually agree with him. A little of all that would be a godsend for some idiots who think they’re the be-all and end-all. Except that the idiots haven’t read the book and aren’t reading this period either.”

Literary critic Rodrigo Gurgel praised Felipe Moura Brasil’s editorial work, noting that “The editor of this volume took care to include insightful and relevant notes that point to supplementary bibliography and provide illuminating excerpts from the author’s other texts.”
