= Lucas Mendes (journalist) =

Brazilian journalist and television presenter

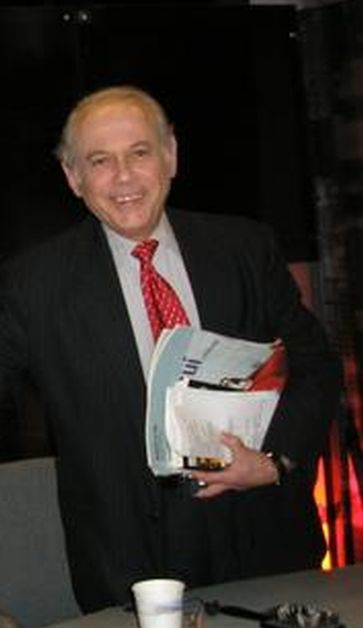
- Born: Lucas Mendes Campos; 2 May 1944 (age 82); Belo Horizonte, Minas Gerais, Brazil
- Occupation: Journalist
- Notable credit: Manhattan Connection
- Spouse: Rose Ganguzza
- Children: 2, including Antonio Campos

Lucas Mendes Campos (born 4 May 1944) is a Brazilian journalist and television presenter. He was awarded the Maria Moors Cabot Award, the oldest international journalism awards in the United States. In 2015 Campos was one of the 5 recipients of the award for outstanding reporting on the Americas because of his work dedicated to promoting dialogue and democracy in the Americas.

== Biography ==
Campos was born in Belo Horizonte, Minas Gerais state. He studied at the Military College of Belo Horizonte. Lucas made a career in Rio de Janeiro, where he moved in 1965 to work in the Bloch magazines, such as the extinct Manchete magazine. In 1968, he became correspondent for the group in New York when he moved there to take a course.

== Career ==
In 1975 he was hired by Rede Globo, of which he was an international correspondent from 1985 to 1990. From 1990 to 1992 he worked behind the scenes for Rede Record.

During his career at Globo's New York office, he covered memorable events with stories for Jornal Nacional, Jornal da Globo, Fantástico and Globo Repórter, as the exclusive interview with Robert Gallo, one of the scientists who identified the AIDS virus, the Falklands War, John Lennon's Murder, Challenger Space Shuttle Accident, Watergate Case, and Presidential Inauguration of American Presidents Jimmy Carter (1977) and Ronald Reagan (1981).

The coverage of Carter's presidential inauguration, which mobilized dozens of professionals, many from Brazil, was the first major coverage, produced by Globo journalism, of which he was a part.

Interviews with key personalities also marked his career. In his resume, there are talks with filmmaker Woody Allen, boxer Muhammad Ali and Palestinian leader Yasser Arafat.

In 1993 he created the Manhattan Connection program for Globosat's GNT, where he continues today as a presenter and executive editor. He also writes periodic columns for the BBC Brazil.
