= Pedro Andrade =

Brazilian journalist and model (born 1979)

- Born: April 14, 1979 (age 47); Rio de Janeiro, Brazil
- Occupations: Journalist; model
- Years active: 1986–present
- Notable work: Manhattan Connection
- Children: 1

Pedro Andrade (born April 14, 1979) is a Brazilian journalist and model.

== Career ==
He began his acting career at the age of seven in Brazil. A student of journalism, Andrade originally came to the United States on a poetry scholarship.

Andrade was discovered by fashion photographer Mario Testino. Besides hosting LXTV 1st Look TV, he has a show on LXTV.com called On The Rocks: The Search for America's Top Bartender. Andrade also runs a website about fashion, food, art, nightlife and entertainment. He was also a reporter for Manhattan Connection, a Brazilian television show at Globo News and Globo TV Cable News Network. On Brazilian radio, he presents a weekly show, Conexão América (America Connection) at Eldorado FM Station. In 1999, Andrade appeared in LG Electronics television commercials.

Through volunteer work, donations and special appearances, Andrade supports a number of humanitarian causes such as cancer research, AIDS research, environmental preservation, as well as a number of children's charities such as the Make-A-Wish Foundation and Big Brother. In 2007, he and his dog, Miles, appeared alongside Oprah Winfrey, Gisele Bündchen and Kelly Ripa in Pose For Paws, a coffee table book by photographer Brian Nice benefiting the Humane Society.

== Controversies ==
In 2002, while still working as a model and trying to kick-start his acting career, Andrade frequented the pages of the main newspapers and magazines in Brazil claiming to be the protagonist of the next David Lynch film. However, although it had wide coverage by the São Paulo press, the newspaper Folha de São Paulo investigated the information with the production of the filmmaker who categorically denied the information. Told by the newspaper, the agent informed that the film did not exist. On the other hand, according to Andrade, the production of the film would be "indignant" with him for having released the film without authorisation: "They won't mind if I come off as a liar".

== Personal life ==
Andrade is gay. He resides in the West Village neighborhood of New York City. In the summer of 2007, he briefly dated Lance Bass of the vocal group NSYNC. Andrade is currently in a relationship with hairstylist Benjamin Parker Thigpen. Their daughter, Isabel Andrade Thigpen, was born on January 26, 2024, through their surrogate, Whitney Caskey.

== Filmography ==
=== Television ===
Year	Title	Role
2009–11	1st Look	Host
2009–21	Manhattan Connection	Host
2013	The Morning Show	Host
2015	Entertainment Tonight	Host
2016–18	Pedro Pelo Mundo	Himself (host)
2021	Unknown Amazon with Pedro Andrade	Himself
2021–present	Entre Mundos	Host
