= Olavo de Carvalho =

Brazilian right-wing polemicist (1947–2022)

Olavo de Carvalho GCRB
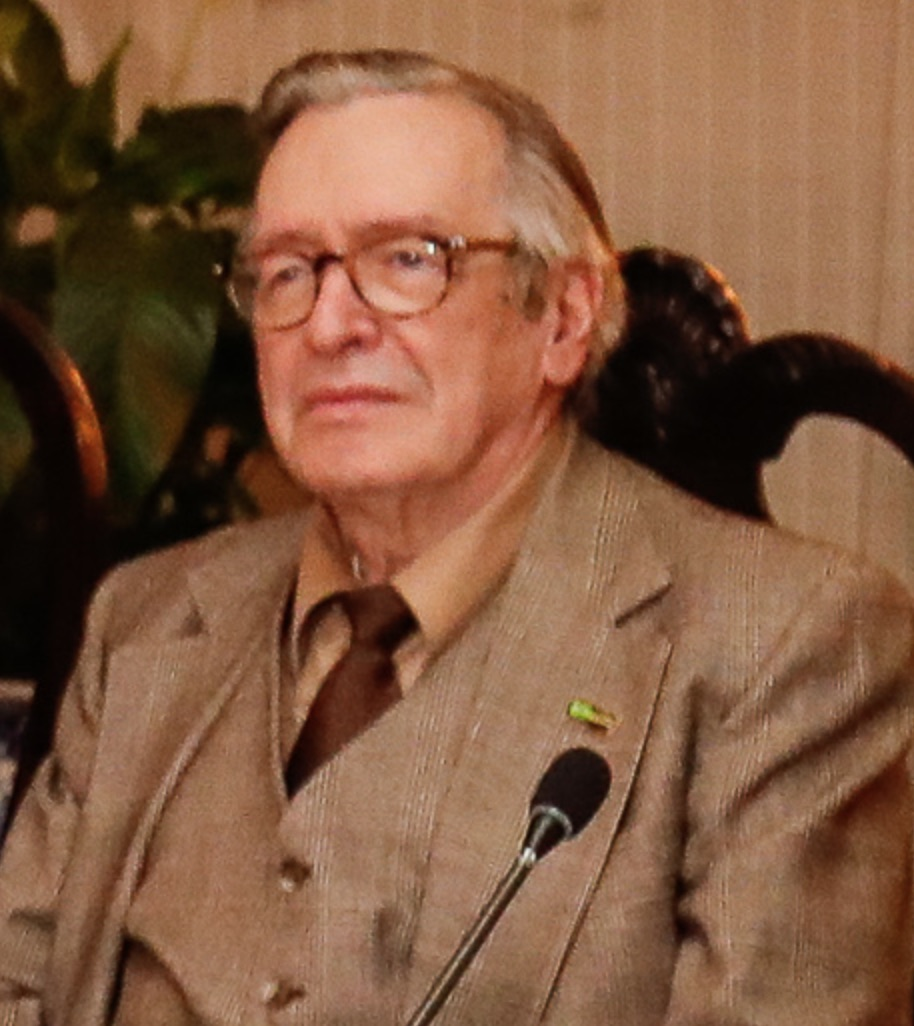
- Carvalho in 2019
- Born: Olavo Luiz Pimentel de Carvalho; 29 April 1947; Campinas, São Paulo, Brazil
- Died: 24 January 2022 (aged 74); Richmond, Virginia, U.S.
- Occupations: Author, teacher, astrologer (1979–1982), journalist
- Spouse: Roxane Andrade de Souza (Note: Brazilian Portuguese: [ʁo'ʃɐ̃.ni ɐ̃ˈdɾa.dʒi dɪ 'so.wza]) (m. 1986–2022)
- Children: 8

Olavo Luiz Pimentel de Carvalho (Note: According to the rules for names in Portuguese, the maternal family name comes first followed by the paternal one. He is often referred to by his first name rather than his last.) GCRB (Brazilian Portuguese: [oˈlavu luˈis pimẽˈtɛw dʒi kaʁˈvaʎu]; 29 April 1947 – 24 January 2022) was a Brazilian self-proclaimed philosopher, (Note: There were controversies over whether he should be considered a philosopher.) political pundit, astrologer, journalist, and far-right conspiracy theorist.

While publishing about politics, literature and philosophy since the 1980s, he made himself known to wider Brazilian audiences from the 1990s onwards, mainly writing columns for some of Brazil's major media outlets, such as the newspaper O Globo. In the 2000s, he began to use personal blogs and social media to convey his conservative and anti-communist ideas. In the late 2010s, he rose to prominence in the Brazilian public debate, being dubbed the "intellectual father of the new right" and the ideologue of Jair Bolsonaro, a label which he rejected.

His books and articles spread conspiracy theories and false information, and he was accused of fomenting hate speech and anti-intellectualism. He positioned himself as a critic of modernity. His interests included historical philosophy, the history of revolutionary movements, the Traditionalist School and comparative religion. His views were rejected by mainstream philosophers.

From 2005 until his death, he lived near Richmond, Virginia, in the United States. He died in 2022 several days after testing positive for COVID-19.

== Early life and education ==
Olavo de Carvalho's father was a lawyer and his mother worked in the printing industry. They divorced while he was a child. His first name, which he claimed meant "survivor" in Norwegian, was chosen by his grandmother.

He told an interviewer that he was born sick and spent seven years bedridden. He had heart problems and Lyme disease.

He was in school up to the fourth grade of elementary school.

== Career ==
Carvalho acted as an astrologer from 1979 to 1982, having learned it from, among others, the Argentine psychologist Juan Alfredo César Müller. In 1979, he founded the "Revista de Astrologia Júpiter" ("Jupiter: Astrology Review"); around this time, he introduced himself in his business card as the "scientific director of the Brazilian Astrocharacterology Society", headquartered at his home. "Astrocharacterology" (astrocaracterologia) is Olavo's own pseudoscience, "whose task is to separate poetic language from symbolic language, showing the objectivity of astrological language".

From the 1970s to the 2000s, he wrote for several Brazilian magazines and newspapers, such as Bravo!, Primeira Leitura, Claudia, O Globo, Folha de S.Paulo (starting in February 1977 with an article about The Magic Flute in the "Folhetim" literary supplement), Época and Zero Hora.

In 2002, Carvalho founded the website Maskless Media (Mídia Sem Máscara). It presents itself as an observatory of the news media. He was the host of the show True Outspeak on BlogTalkRadio, which aired from 2006 to 2013. As of 2019, he wrote a weekly column for the Brazilian newspaper Diário do Comércio and taught philosophy in an online course to over 2,000 students. In his online classes, he often wore a cowboy hat or smoked a pipe. He is said to have introduced to Portuguese-speaking readers works of important conservative philosophers of the 20th century, such as Eric Voegelin. In addition to newspaper articles and many blog and social media posts, he authored a number of books, many of them collections of previously published texts. A list of his books published by one of his students in 2018 included 32 books.

Carvalho founded the Inter-American Institute for Philosophy, Government, and Social Thought in 2009, and served as its president. He collaborated with Ted Baehr, Paul Gottfried, Judith Reisman, Alejandro Peña Esclusa, and Stephen Baskerville through the Inter-American Institute. The institute closed down in 2018, possibly due to complaints made by Carvalho's former students to the institute's board that, among other complaints, he never concluded the secondary education, and was not, as his profile in the Institute claimed, a former senior lecturer in the Catholic University of Paraná.

In 2011, Carvalho had a written debate online with Aleksandr Dugin in 2011 on "The US and the New World Order".

In 2020, Carvalho was ordered to pay 2.8 million Brazilian reais in libel charges after accusing musician Caetano Veloso of sexual crimes against children.

=== Influence on Bolsonaro ===
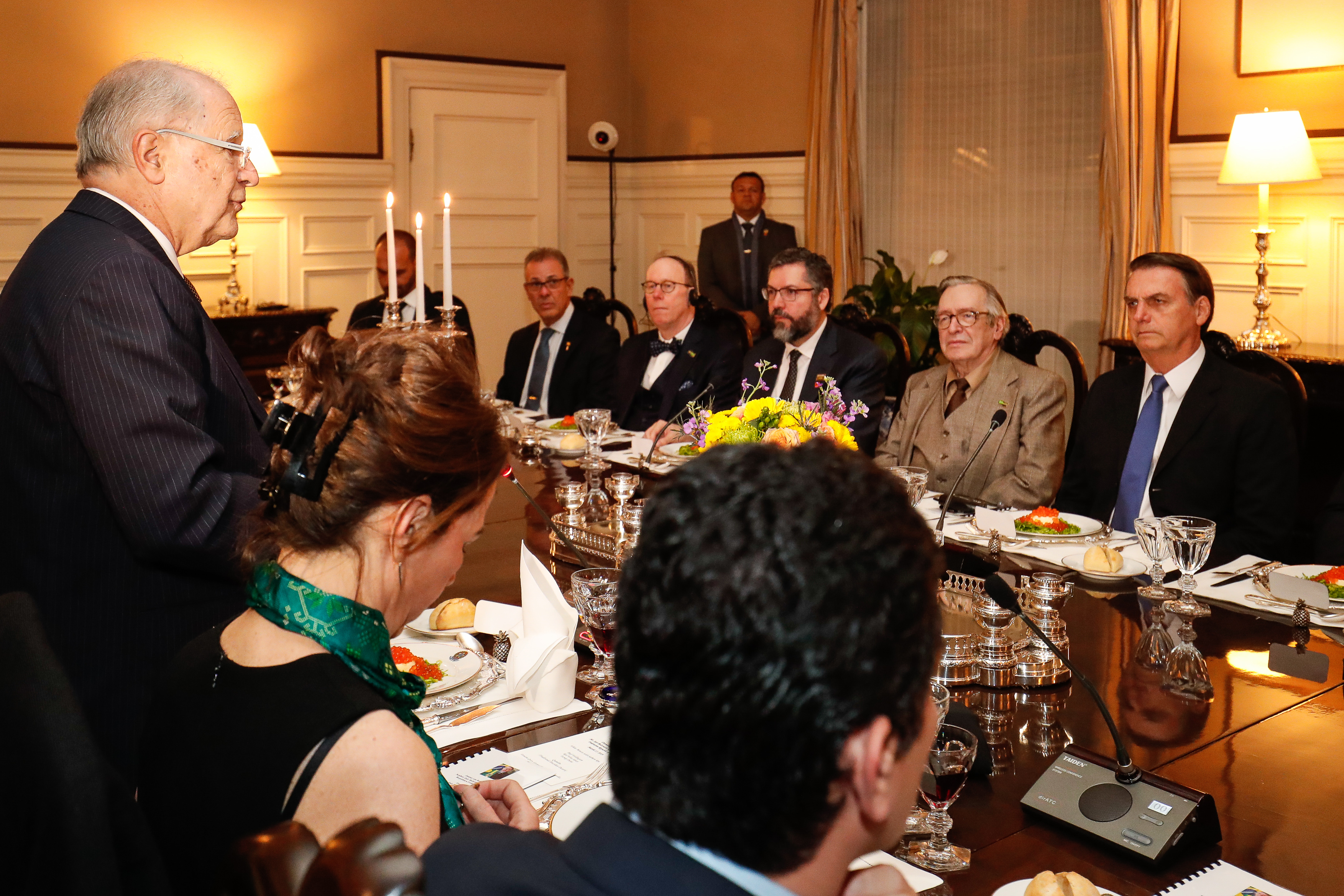
Dinner at the Brazilian embassy in Washington, D.C., in March 2019, Carvalho between Bolsonaro (right) and Araújo (left).

Carvalho became one of the most influential individuals during the administration of Jair Bolsonaro. According to one account, Bolsonaro got interested in Carvalho's ideas in 2013. In 2014, Bolsonaro and Carvalho started transmitting their live video chats through politically conservative YouTube channels. In 2017, Carvalho was depicted as the "ideologue" of Bolsonaro, a title he refused.

Carvalho believed that the Foro de São Paulo "is the largest political organization that has ever existed in Latin America and undoubtedly one of the largest in the world". Partido dos Trabalhadores, the party of Bolsonaro's opponent Fernando Haddad, is a member of Foro de São Paulo. Shortly before the election, Olavo shared the false information that a book written by Fernando Haddad, the opponent of Jair Bolsonaro during the 2018 Brazilian general election, promoted incest.

In his first live speech on Facebook after being elected, Bolsonaro was pictured next to one of the books written by Carvalho, in what was interpreted as a sign of his influence over the newly elected president. Journalists writing for El País and Folha, respectively, claimed that Carvalho influenced the nomination of two prominent Ministers by Bolsonaro: Ricardo Vélez Rodríguez (Education) and Ernesto Araújo (Foreign Affairs). Leonardo Sakamoto, writing for the website UOL (Universo Online), also made these claims, but emphasized Bolsonaro's responsibility for these ministers.

In November 2018, after the Brazilian presidential election, Carvalho declared that, if nominated by President-elect Jair Bolsonaro, he would accept the role of Brazilian ambassador to the United States. However, in February 2019, Carvalho clashed with some key figures of the Bolsonaro administration, including the vice-president, Hamilton Mourão, whom he accused of being a "traitor" and an "idiot" who is "pro-abortion, pro-disarmament and pro-Nicolás Maduro". Mourão dismissed the criticisms.

On 17 March 2019, Carvalho criticised the presence of military personnel in Bolsonaro's administration, stating: "He didn't choose two hundred generals. Two hundred generals chose him. Those people want to restore the 1964 regime under a democratic aspect. They're ruling and using Bolsonaro as a condom. I'm not saying that it is the reality, but it is what they want. Mourão said that they would return to power democratically. If it is not a coup, it is a coup mentality."

In 2020, Sleeping Giants started a campaign to reduce his influence on Brazilian politics and convinced advertisers to remove their media buying from his online newspaper and YouTube channel. This led to PayPal deciding to cancel their contract with Carvalho, and remove their services from his online seminars, citing violation of terms of use.

Carvalho became critical of Bolsonaro in his final months and accused him of failing to repel communism.

== Personal life ==
=== Tariqa ===
Carvalho was a member of the tariqa headed by Frithjof Schuon. Although it was officially a tariqa, that is, an esoteric Sufi Islamic order, it was headed by Frithjof Schuon, the Perennialist author of "The Transcendent Unity of Religions", and therefore syncretically incorporated various elements from other traditions.

=== Family ===
His eldest daughter, Heloísa de Carvalho Martins Arriba, accused her father of occasional maltreatment of his children. All content was wrapped in a letter that was later shared on Facebook. According to the letter, Olavo had even pointed a gun to the head of one of his children. She made other accusations, such as that, during the time in which Olavo had been a member of a tariqa, he kept a polygamous relationship, living with three wives simultaneously. The accusations were denied by her siblings and by Olavo himself, who initiated a lawsuit against her citing that in her letter she "distances herself from any contact with reality by spreading outrageous lies and vile insults".

Heloísa died on 8 January 2026, at the age of 56.

== Death ==
Olavo de Carvalho's family announced his death on social media, on 24 January 2022, eight days after he tested positive for COVID-19. His family's statement did not specify his cause of death, but his daughter Heloísa said that it was from coronavirus. His personal doctor denied it was COVID-19 and stated officially that his death was caused by respiratory stress associated with emphysema, heart failure, bacterial pneumonia, and a generalised infection. Carvalho was known for his vaccine hesitancy and often questioned the severity of COVID-19 pandemic, spreading COVID-19 misinformation on his social media.

According to his family, he died at a hospital outside of Richmond, Virginia. He reportedly confessed his sins to a Roman Catholic priest and received the last rites before his death. At his death he left his widow, eight children, and eighteen grandchildren. He is buried at St. Joseph's Cemetery in Petersburg, Virginia.

== Misinformation ==
Carvalho spread fake news and false information on various topics.

=== Pepsi sweetener hoax ===
Carvalho helped spread the hoax of Pepsi using cells from aborted fetuses to sweeten soft drinks.

=== Climate change ===
Carvalho claimed that global warming is a hoax produced by a conspiracy.

=== Health ===
In a 2016 Twitter post, Carvalho claimed that "vaccines either kill you or drive you crazy. Never vaccinate your children."

He spread a conspiracy theory that AIDS does not pose a risk to heterosexuals.

On 22 March 2020, during the COVID-19 pandemic, a disease caused by the SARS-CoV-2 virus, he asserted in a livestream on YouTube that there was no confirmed case of death from the virus in the world and that the pandemic would be "an invention" and "the most extensive manipulation of public opinion that has ever happened in human history". At that date, according to the World Health Organization, there were more than 294,000 cases of the disease and 12,784 deaths from it. He often trivialized the pandemic as the "moronoavirus", even after it killed more than 200,000 Brazilians. His daughter Heloísa blamed such statements for influencing Brazil's delay in buying COVID-19 vaccines.

=== United States politics ===
Carvalho alleged that Barack Obama's documents such as his birth certificate were not genuine. He shared a forged picture on social media that purportedly showed a "foreign student" card from Columbia University with Barack Obama's name on it, as well as a different forged hoax that showed a Kenya birth certificate with Obama's name on it.

On the evening of the January 6 United States Capitol attack in 2021, Carvalho was interviewed about the incident by Jovem Pan, Brazil's largest conservative radio station, and repeated falsehoods that had led to the attack. In the interview he made the false claim that election fraud had taken place in the 2020 American presidential election, saying, "Everything in this election has been fraudulent", and also falsely asserted that Joe Biden had Parkinson's disease and that Biden and Kamala Harris were working for the Chinese government.

=== Inquisition ===
Carvalho advocated a revisionist view of the Inquisition, claiming it is a myth spread by Protestants.

== Science disputes ==
Carvalho had various criticisms of science and scientists, often controversial. His daughter described him as "anti-science".

He claimed in a lecture that Albert Einstein's theory of general relativity was plagiarized from earlier theorists such as Poincaré and Lorentz, and argued in a book against Georg Cantor's proof that the set of natural numbers has the same cardinality as the set of even numbers. He claimed in a 2006 essay that Isaac Newton introduced a self-contradictory thesis into the Western mind, which was responsible for spreading a virus of "formidable stupidity". The thesis in question referred to "eternal motion" and the law of inertia: the latter would claim that "the force of its own inertia perpetually maintains each body in its present state, whether at rest or in uniform rectilinear motion", but "if motion is eternal, it makes no sense to speak of a 'present state' except in reference to a living observer endowed with a sense of temporality." Carvalho went on to claim that the idea of eternal motion, besides contradicting the law of inertia, also contradicted itself. Elsewhere, Carvalho also argued that Newton's law of gravity cannot serve as a causal explanation of phenomena.

== Philosophy ==
Carvalho considered himself a philosopher, (Note: There were controversies over whether he should be considered a philosopher.) and had theories about the definition of philosophy, Aristotle, and epistemology.

=== Definition of philosophy ===
Carvalho defined philosophy as "the search for the unity of knowledge in the unity of consciousness and vice-versa". In The Political Science Reviewer, Victor Bruno highlighted Carvalho's conceptualization of philosophy as an adventurous search, akin to an individual's struggle for illumination, and contrasted it with Gnostic thought. Martim Vasques da Cunha cited the definition as representing an "interior struggle" that "would be translated, both in concepts and actions, into the 'philosopheme', 'the ideal system of intuitions and thoughts that is hidden behind texts, a system that texts reflect irregularly and unevenly, sometimes with missing parts, and that can only be contemplated by those who reconstruct it'". Cunha, who was otherwise critical of Carvalho, cited Olavo de Carvalho's works "Nova Era e Revolução Cultural" and "A dialética simbólica" in relationship with the definition.

=== "Four discourses" in Aristotle ===
Carvalho believed that, according to Aristotle, "human discourse is a single power, which actualizes itself in four different ways: poetics, rhetoric, dialectic, and analytic (logic)". This would be in contrast to views which would see poetics and rhetoric as sharply divided from analytical logic. His writings about this view were collected in his book "Aristóteles em nova perspectiva: Introdução à teoria dos quatro discursos" ("Aristotle in a New Perspective: Introduction to the Theory of the Four Discourses"). Victor Bruno described Olavo's reading of Aristotle as "idiosyncratic".

In Aristotle in a New Perspective: Introduction to the Theory of the Four Discourses, Olavo de Carvalho outlines a theoretical model representing four ways human discourse can shape another individual's mind. Olavo uses these categories to map out an escalating scale of credibility in the realm of discourse: First, poetic discourse primarily deals with the possible, targeting the imagination and engaging with the realm of presumption. Second, rhetorical discourse seeks to establish plausibility (verossimilhança), aiming to invoke a strong belief and the consent of the will, going beyond mere imaginative presumption. This level of discourse serves to instigate decision-making based on commonly accepted beliefs. Third, dialectical discourse focuses on scrutinizing beliefs through objections, employing back-and-forth thought processes to distinguish truths from errors, thereby gauging the probability of a belief or thesis. This modality does not merely conform to common beliefs but rather assesses them based on the criteria of rationality and accurate information. Finally, logical or analytical discourse starts from universally accepted premises and seeks apodictic certainty through syllogistic reasoning.

Thus, a progression in credibility can be observed, moving from the possible, to the plausible, to the probable, and ultimately, to the certain or true. Each category demonstrates a degree of gradation rather than a difference in nature. The four modalities are thus integral to each other, reflecting distinct human attitudes towards discourse and the motivations for engaging in it.

=== Cognitive parallax ===
Carvalho, taking inspiration from "the symbol of old cameras", coined the term "cognitive parallax" to "designate the structural displacement between the axis of a thinker's actual experience and the axis of their theoretical construction". He wrote that Machiavelli was an example of cognitive parallax because "he taught the Prince to rise to power with the help of allies and then kill them, whereas obviously, he himself, as the author of the plan and therefore one of the Prince's greatest allies, would have been among the first to die if the plan were put into action." He also wrote that Descartes's interpretation of his "Olympian dreams" was an example. Olavo gave two other examples: "Kant's theory of the unknowability of the 'thing-in-itself'", and Karl Marx's claim "that only the proletariat can grasp the real movement of history, because the classes that precede it are trapped in the subjective fantasy of their respective class ideologies".

== Political philosophy ==
As described by an obituary, Carvalho's political views were summed up in one of his tweets: "Capitalism is the godfather and protector of communism. The war is not between capitalism and communism, it is between CHRISTIANITY and communism."

Carvalho philosophized that a "revolutionary mentality" (mentalidade revolucionária) had contributed to a decline of modern politics and culture. He wrote that this mentality had begun to take shape in Europe during the late 18th and early 19th centuries and became more pronounced with the rise of Communist movements in the 20th century. He saw himself as taking the counter-revolutionary, or conservative, stance.

Carvalho argued that the mentality is supported and propagated by powerful entities including international organizations, wealthy families, and businessmen. He referred to these as "the Syndicate", and alleged that it was dedicated to establishing a global socialist dictatorship. Such a characterization contrasts with traditional economic liberalism, which posits that businessmen and capitalists are naturally opposed to socialism.

In Carvalho's view, the revolutionary mentality led to the emergence of "metacapitalism", which he described as a "shadow capitalism" working in tandem with government power, especially under communist regimes. The anti-capitalist organization Nova Resistência saw this notion as similar to the notions of crony capitalism and corporativist capitalism; the journalist João Pedro Sabino Guimarães, writing for O Globo, saw it as a conspiracy theory.

Carvalho said Western globalism was driven by the revolutionary mentality. Drawing from the work of Antonio Gramsci, Carvalho argued that cultural agents can impose the mentality on a society by overturning its traditional culture. These agents, who Carvalho called "organic intellectuals", work to change people's traditional modes of thought into a revolutionary one, undermining religion and common sense, he said.

Carvalho's interpretation of the traditionalist school is unique in that it is only its criticism of science but rejects its belief in cyclical history and in his debate with Aleksandr Dugin, he warned against supporting Russia because in the writings of René Guénon, he posited a theory that there are seven towers of the devil where "counter-initiation" can be initiated and of the seven towers there is one in Turkestan and two in the Ural Mountains, meaning that there are three towers of satanic initiation in the west.

== Works ==
=== Essays ===
- (1980). A Imagem do Homem na Astrologia. São Paulo: Jvpiter.
- (1983). O Crime da Madre Agnes ou A Confusão entre Espiritualidade e Psiquismo. São Paulo: Speculum.
- (1983). Questões de Simbolismo Astrológico. São Paulo: Speculum.
- (1983). Universalidade e Abstração e outros Estudos. São Paulo: Speculum.
- (1985). Astros e Símbolos. São Paulo: Nova Stella.
- (1986). Astrologia e Religião. São Paulo: Nova Stella.
- (1986). Fronteiras da Tradição. São Paulo: Nova Stella.
- (1992). Símbolos e Mitos no Filme "O Silêncio dos Inocentes". Rio de Janeiro: Instituto de Artes Liberais.
- (1993). Os Gêneros Literários: Seus Fundamentos Metafísicos. Rio de Janeiro: IAL & Stella Caymmi.
- (1993). O Caráter como Forma Pura da Personalidade. Rio de Janeiro: Astroscientia Editora.
- (1994). A Nova Era e a Revolução Cultural : Fritjof Capra & Antonio Gramsci. Rio de Janeiro: Instituto de Artes Liberais & Stella Caymmi [São Paulo: Vide Editorial, 2014].
- (1994). Uma Filosofia Aristotélica da Cultura. Rio de Janeiro: Instituto de Artes Liberais.
  - Aristóteles em Nova Perspectiva: Introdução à Teoria dos Quatro Discursos. Rio de Janeiro: Topbooks, 1996 [São Paulo: É Realizações, 2007; Campinas, SP: Vide Editorial, 2013].
- (1995). O Jardim das Aflições : De Epicuro à Ressurreição de César, Ensaio sobre o Materialismo e a Religião Civil. Rio de Janeiro: Diadorim [São Paulo: É Realizações, 2000; Campinas, SP: Vide Editorial, 2015].
- (1994). O Imbecil Coletivo : Atualidades Inculturais Brasileiras. Rio de Janeiro: Faculdade da Cidade [São Paulo: É Realizações, 2007; Rio de Janeiro: Record, 2018].
- (1997). O Futuro do Pensamento Brasileiro: Estudos sobre o Nosso Lugar no Mundo. Rio de Janeiro: Faculdade da Cidade Editora [É Realizações, 2007].
- (1998). A Longa Marcha da Vaca Para o Brejo & Os Filhos da PUC : O Imbecil Coletivo II. Rio de Janeiro: Topbooks [São Paulo: É Realizações, 2008; São Paulo: Record (forthcoming)].
- (2002–2006). Coleção História Essencial da Filosofia, 32 vol. São Paulo: É Realizações.
- (2007). A Dialética Simbólica : Ensaios Reunidos. São Paulo: É Realizações [Campinas, SP: Vide Editorial, 2015].
- (2011). Maquiavel, ou A Confusão Demoníaca. Campinas, SP: Vide Editorial.
- (2012). A Filosofia e seu Inverso. Campinas, SP: Vide Editorial.
- (2012). Os EUA e a Nova Ordem Mundial: Um Debate entre Olavo de Carvalho e Aleksandr Dugin. Campinas, SP: Vide Editorial. 2012. (with Aleksandr Dugin).
- (2013). O Mínimo Que Você Precisa Saber para Não Ser um Idiota. Edited by Felipe Moura Brasil. Rio de Janeiro: Record
- (2013). Apoteose da vigarice. Campinas, SP: Vide Editorial.
- (2013). Visões de Descartes : entre o gênio mau e o espírito da verdade. Campinas, SP: Vide Editorial.
- (2014). O mundo como jamais funcionou : Cartas de um terráqueo ao planeta Brasil – Volume II. Campinas, SP: Vide Editorial.
- (2014). A Fórmula para Enlouquecer o Mundo: Cartas de um Terráqueo ao Planeta Brasil, vol. 3. Campinas, SP: Vide Editorial.
- (2015). A Inversão Revolucionária em Ação: Cartas de um Terráqueo ao Planeta Brasil, vol. 4. Campinas, SP: Vide Editorial.
- (2016). O Império Mundial da Burla: Cartas de um Terráqueo ao Planeta Brasil, vol. 5. Campinas, SP: Vide Editorial.
- (2016). O Dever de Insultar: Cartas de um Terráqueo ao Planeta Brasil, vol. 6. Campinas, SP: Vide Editorial.
- (2017). Breve Retrato do Brasil: Cartas de um Terráqueo ao Planeta Brasil, vol. 7. Campinas, SP: Vide Editorial.
- (2022). O Imbecil Coletivo III: O Imbecil Juvenil. Campinas, SP: VIDE Editorial.
- (2022). O Foro de São Paulo: A ascensão do comunismo latino-americano. Campinas, SP: VIDE Editorial.

=== Other publications ===
- (1973). Tabu, by Alan Watts. São Paulo: Editora Três (translation and preface, with Fernando de Castro Ferreira).
- (1981). A Metafísica Oriental, by René Guénon. São Paulo: Escola Júpiter (translation).
- (1984). Comentários à "Metafísica Oriental" de René Guénon, by Michel Veber. São Paulo: Speculum (introduction and notes).
- (1997). Como Vencer um debate sem precisar ter Razão : em 38 estratagemas : dialética erística. by Arthur Schopenhauer. Rio de Janeiro: Topbooks (introduction, notes and explanatory comments).
- (1997). O Espírito das Revoluções, by J.O. de Meira Penna. Rio de Janeiro: Faculdade da Cidade Editora (preface).
- (1998). O Exército na História do Brasil, 3 Vol. Rio de Janeiro/Salvador: Biblioteca do Exército & Fundação Odebrecht (editor).
- (1998). Teatro Oficina: Onde a Arte não Dormia, by Ítala Nandi. Rio de Janeiro: Faculdade da Cidade Editora (preface).
- (1999). Ensaios Reunidos, 1942–1978, by Otto Maria Carpeaux. Rio de Janeiro: UniverCidade & Topbooks (introduction and notes).
- (1999). A Sociedade de confiança: ensaios sobre as origens e a natureza do desenvolvimento. by Alain Peyrefitte. Rio de Janeiro: Topbooks (introduction).
- (1999). Aristóteles, by Émile Boutroux. Rio de Janeiro: Record (introduction and notes).
- (2001). As Seis Doenças do Espírito Contemporâneo, by Constantin Noica. Rio de Janeiro: Record (introduction and notes).
- (2001). Admirável Mundo Novo, by Aldous Huxley. São Paulo: Editora Globo (preface).
- (2001). A Ilha, by Aldous Huxley. São Paulo: Editora Globo (preface).
- (2001). A Coerência das Incertezas, by Paulo Mercadante. São Paulo: É Realizações (introduction and notes).
- (2001). A Sabedoria das Leis Eternas, by Mário Ferreira dos Santos. São Paulo: É Realizações (introduction and notes).
- (2002). A Origem da Linguagem, by Eugen Rosenstock-Huessy. Rio de Janeiro: Editora Record (edition and notes, with Carlos Nougué).
- (2004). Escolha e Sobrevivência, by Ângelo Monteiro. São Paulo: É Realizações (preface).
- (2008). O Eixo do Mal Latino-americano e a Nova Ordem Mundial, by Heitor de Paola. São Paulo: É Realizações (preface).
- (2011). O Enigma Quântico, by Wolfgang Smith. Campinas, SP: VIDE Editorial (preface).
- (2014). Ponerologia: Psicopatas no Poder, by Andrzej Łobaczewski. Campinas, SP: VIDE Editorial (preface).
- (2015). A Tomada do Brasil, by Percival Puggina. Porto Alegre: Editora Concreta (preface).
- (2015). Cabo Anselmo: Minha Verdade, by José Anselmo dos Santos. São Paulo: Matrix (preface).
- (2017). 1964: O Elo Perdido; O Brasil nos Arquivos do Serviço Secreto Comunista, by Mauro "Abranches" Kraenski and Vladimir Petrilák. Campinas, SP: VIDE Editorial (preface).
- (2019). A Vida Intelectual, by A.-D. Sertillanges. São Paulo: Kírion (preface).
- (2019). Traição Americana: O Ataque Secreto aos Estados Unidos, by Diana West. São Paulo: Sophia Perennis (preface)

=== Works in English ===
- (2000). "Otto Maria Carpeaux." Portuguese Literary & Cultural Studies. Special Issue, No. 4. João Cezarde Castro Rocha (org.), University of Massachusetts, Dartmouth.
- (2005). "From Poetics to Logic: Exploring Some Neglected Aspects of Aristotle's Organon," in Handbook of the First World Congress and School on Universal Logic, UNILOG'05, ed. Jean-Yves Beziau and Alexandre Costa-Leite. pp. 57–59.

=== Translated works ===
- (2016). Statele Unite și Noua Ordine Mondială: O Dezbatere între Olavo de Carvalho și Aleksandr Dughin. Translated by Simina Popa and Cristina Nițu. Bucharest: Editura Humanitas. Translation of Os EUA e a Nova Ordem Mundial (with Alexander Dugin).
