= Denis Lerrer Rosenfield =

Brazilian writer and philosopher

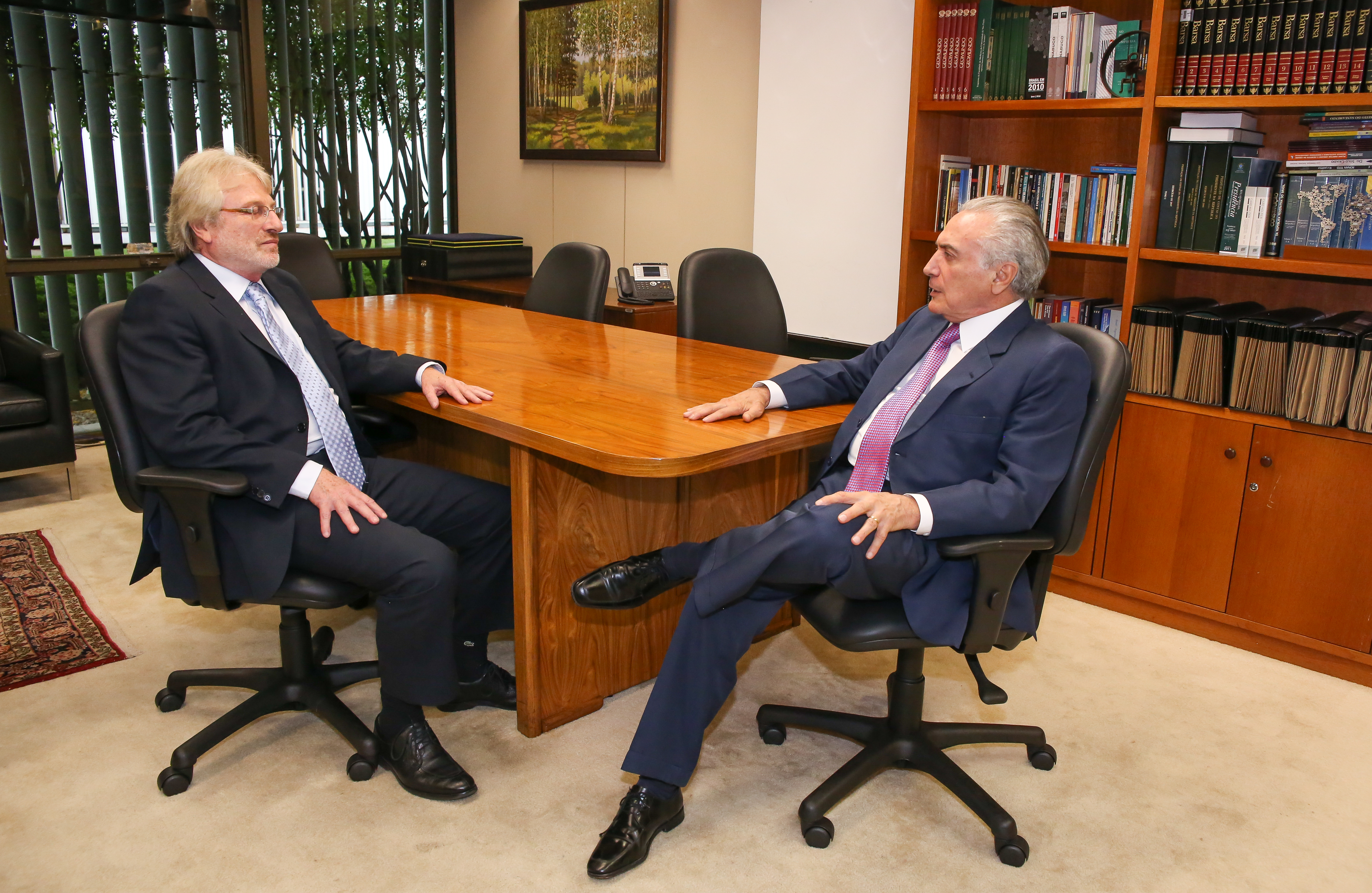
- Born: November 21, 1950 (age 75); Porto Alegre, Brazil

Philosophical work
- School: Hegelianism; Objectivism
- Institutions: National Autonomous University of Mexico; Pantheon-Sorbonne University
- Main interests: Political philosophy, democracy, politics, public affairs, politics, ethics

Denis Lerrer Rosenfield (born November 21, 1950) is a Brazilian writer and columnist. Along with Patrícia Carlos de Andrade, Rosenfield has co-founded the Millennium Institute in 2005.

== Academic life ==
Rosenfield has a degree in philosophy from the National Autonomous University of Mexico, and in 1982 he earned a doctorate in philosophy from Université Paris 1 . In 1999, he obtained a post-doctorate at the École Normale Supérieure Lettres et Sciences Humaines (Fontenay/St Cloud).

He is Professor of Philosophy at the Federal University of Rio Grande do Sul.

== Controversies ==
A defender of individual liberties and of the right to private property, Rosenfield has positioned himself against state interference in citizens' lives. In an interview to Veja's magazine in 2011, he characterized ANVISA, a Brazilian government agency akin to the US' Food and Drug Administration, as "the great tutor of the Brazilian citizen, one who knows everything and to whom we owe blind obedience." According to Rosenfield, the ANVISA Agency was being run by "schizophrenics" whose sole purpose has been to meddle in the lives of the Brazilians.

Rosenfield sees no problem in being called a "rightist", since it means "the defense of personal freedom, of the state and of the property rights."

== Selected publications ==
- — (2007). Reflexões sobre o direito à propriedade. Rio de Janeiro: Elsevier Editora. p. 207.
- — (2009). Liberdade de Escolha. Rio de Janeiro: Casa da Palavra Produção Editorial. p. 95.
- Hegel, a Moralidade e a Religião (n. 3) (in Brazilian Portuguese). Jorge Zahar. 2002. ISBN 978-85-7110-660-4.
- Política e liberdade em Hegel (in Portuguese). Ed. Ática. 1995. ISBN 978-85-08-05551-7.
