= Viveza criolla =

Latin American philosophy

"Viveza criolla" is Spanish language phrase literally meaning "creole vivacity" and may be translated as "creoles' cleverness" or "creoles cunning". It describes a way of life in Argentina, Colombia, Ecuador, Peru, Uruguay, and Venezuela, among other Latin American countries. It is also known as "criollada" in Peru.

It is a philosophy of progress along the line of least resistance, ignoring rules, and a lack of a sense of responsibility and consideration for others. It extends to all social groups and throughout the entirety of society. In Argentina, it is predominantly associated with Buenos Aires and its inhabitants, the porteños. Viveza criolla has been called "the principal cause of a moral, cultural, economic, social and political crisis".

== Characteristics ==
Viveza criolla includes:

- Lack of respect for others and indifference to the common good in a framework of individual interests.
- Political corruption, which extends in all institutions, in the form of perks, direct appropriation of public funds, favoritism, nepotism, misallocation of state resources, etc.
- Extreme individualism, with mistrust of others. This includes having little ability to partner and cooperate in community goals. (Interpersonal trust is a key component of social capital, which is crucial for economic development and proper functioning of democratic institutions.)
- Anomie or weakening of the common morality, and social deviance as behavior that departs from generally accepted standards in society.
- The habit of blaming problems on others, thereby encouraging paranoia and granting a permit to self-indulgence.
- The tendency to take advantage of or cheat others in favor of one's own self-interests, partially for reasons of self-protection and mistrust, but also to assert one's superiority and "quick-wittedness" over another.

== Phrases ==
- Hecha la ley, hecha la trampa. – "Made the law, made the loophole."
- Total, si no robo yo, robará otro. – "In the end, if I do not steal, someone else will."
- El vivo vive del zonzo y el zonzo, de su trabajo. – "The cunning lives off the sucker, and the sucker lives off his job."
- Todos los políticos roban. Él/ella roba, pero hace. – "All politicians steal. He/she steals but delivers [social welfare, public works, infrastructure]."

== See also ==
- List of English words of Spanish origin
- Gérson's law
- Guappo
- Jeitinho
- Malandragem
- Yankee ingenuity
