= Vila Rica (cigarette) =

Brazilian cigarette brand

- An old Brazilian pack of Vila Rica cigarettes.
- Product type: Cigarette
- Current owner: R.J. Reynolds Tobacco Company
- Country: Brazil
- Introduced: 1960s
- Markets: Brazil, Paraguay
- Tagline: "I like to take advantage of everything, right? You too take advantage!"

Vila Rica is a Brazilian brand of cigarettes, currently owned and manufactured by the R. J. Reynolds Tobacco Company.

== History ==
The brand was founded in the 1960s and quickly became popular after the Brazilian football player Gérson starred for an ad for the cigarette brand in 1976.

== Advertising ==
Various poster ads were made to promote Vila Rica in the 1970s. In some, Gérson was included, while in others he was absent.

A few TV adverts were also made, which include the famous slogan "I like to take advantage of everything, right? You too take advantage!".

== Controversy ==
=== Vila Rica and Gérson ===
In 1976, a commercial of the Vila Rica brand was shown on Brazilian television, starring the then famous football player Gérson praising the brand with the infamous slogan: "Gosto de levar vantagem em tudo, certo? Leve vantagem você também!" ("I like to take advantage of everything, right? You too take advantage!"). The line became instantly associated with the traditional Brazilian disregard for laws and social rules as well as bribery and corruption maneauvers, informally named "Jeitinho brasileiro" ("the Brazilian way"), and the expression is largely used to this day. The tagline was eventually phrased the "Lei de Gérson" (Gérson's law), although he later publicly regretted having starred in the ad, claiming his association with such acts did not reflect his true personality.

The reason why R.J. Reynolds chose Gérson for the advert was because he, besides having just won the 1970 FIFA World Cup, when Brazil became three-time world champion, he was an inveterate smoker who lit a cigarette during concentration and training," says Jaques Lewkowicz, a partner at Lew ' Lara, who at the time signed the campaign with José Monserrat Filho. The idea of using the motto of "take advantage" came from football: If a player suffers foulness and the ball is with him, there is no need to stop the match, and the game continues. "Gerson took great advantage of this 'law of advantage', and we wanted to insert it into the campaign, with the concept of more cigarettes at a lower cost," recalls Lewkowicz - who did not think of such an overwhelming repercussion.

== See also ==
- Cigarette
- Tobacco smoking
