= Everardo Rocha =

Brazilian anthropologist (born 1951)

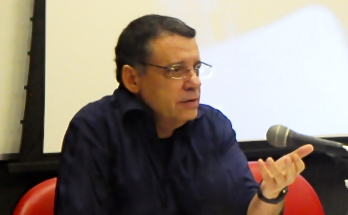
- Rocha in 2012
- Born: October 1, 1951; Rio de Janeiro, Brazil
- Education: National Museum of Brazil
- Scientific career
- Workplaces: Pontifical Catholic University of Rio de Janeiro

Everardo Pereira Guimarães Rocha (born October 1, 1951) is a Brazilian anthropologist dedicated to the study of consumption, advertising, and Brazilian culture. He earned his Ph.D. in Social Anthropology from the National Museum of Brazil at the Federal University of Rio de Janeiro in 1989. He is a Professor in the Department of Communication and its graduate program at the Pontifical Catholic University of Rio de Janeiro, where he has taught since 1976.

In his works, Everardo Rocha articulates perspectives from the fields of Anthropology and Communication. He has been indicated as one of the first anthropologists in Brazil to focus their research on consumption.

Since the 1980s, he has contributed to the consolidation and expansion of studies in the anthropology of consumption. First published in 1985, his book titled Magia e Capitalismo [Magic and Capitalism] is acknowledged for stimulating the development of research on consumption from an anthropological perspective in Brazilian academia.

Everardo Rocha's work explores advertising and consumption as phenomena similar to the classification system known as totemism, as Claude Lévi-Strauss studied it. Hence, he suggests consumption and advertising representations are central spaces for the expression and experience of magical thought in contemporary urban cultures. According to Roberto DaMatta, Everardo Rocha's contribution “is characterized by an intelligent and resolute investigation of the modern world as a gigantic structure of consumption, magic, ideological persuasion, and (...) dreams.”

Furthermore, Rocha has contributed to studies in Social Anthropology and Brazilian culture through books such O que é Etnocentrismo [What is Ethnocentrism] and O que é Mito [What is Myth]. He also participated in the research for Cacá Diegues’s film Quilombo.

== Publications in English ==
- Advertising and consumption: anthropological studies in Brazil. London: Routledge, 2022. ISBN 9781003176794
- Women under control: advertising and the business of female health, 1890-1950. In: Timothy de Waal Malefyt and Maryann McCabe (Ed.), Women, Consumption, and Paradox, Routledge, 2020. ISBN 9781003028109 (with Marina Frid)
- Dona Flor and Scarlett O’Hara: One dilemma, two love stories in Brazilian and American cultures. Social Science Information, 59(4), 730-750, 2020. https://doi.org/10.1177/0539018420973926 (with Marina Frid)
- Do you know who you are selling to? An ethnographic approach to upper-class shopping experiences in Rio de Janeiro. Journal of Consumer Culture, 21(4), 764-781, 2019. https://doi.org/10.1177/1469540519846195 (with Ana Carolina Balthazar)
- Classified beauty: Goods and bodies in Brazilian women’s magazines. Journal of Consumer Culture, 18(1), 83-102, 2018 https://doi.org/10.1177/1469540516641625 (with Marina Frid)
- Classifying and classified: An interpretive study of the consumption of cruises by the “new” Brazilian middle class. International Business Review 25(3), 2016. https://doi.org/10.1016/j.ibusrev.2015.02.006 (with Angela da Rocha and Ana Raquel Coelho Rocha)
- The Woman in Pieces: Advertising and the Construction of Feminine Identity. Sage Open, 3(4), 2013. https://doi.org/10.1177/2158244013506717

== Selected books ==
- Advertising and consumption: anthropological studies in Brazil. London: Routledge, 2022. ISBN 9781003176794
- O paraíso do consumo: Émile Zola, a magia e os grandes magazines. Rio de Janeiro: Mauad, 2016 (with Marina Frid and William Corbo). ISBN 978-8574788449
- A sociedade do sonho: comunicação, cultura e consumo. Rio de Janeiro: Mauad, 1995. ISBN 978-8574784649
- Palmares: mito e romance da utopia brasileira. Rio de Janeiro: Rio Fundo Editora, 1991 (with Carlos Diegues).
- O que é mito. São Paulo: Brasiliense, 1986. ISBN 978-85-11-01151-7
- O que é etnocentrismo. São Paulo: Brasiliense, 1985. ISBN 978-8511011241
- Magia e capitalismo: um estudo antropológico da publicidade. São Paulo: Brasiliense, 1985. ISBN 978-8511000382
- Quilombo: história e sociedade. Rio de Janeiro: Embrafilme/Mec, 1984 (with Maria Fernanda Bicalho).
