= Semiotic engineering =

Semiotic Engineering was originally proposed by Clarisse de Souza as a semiotic approach to designing user interface languages. Over the years, with research done at the Department of Informatics of the Pontifical Catholic University of Rio de Janeiro, it evolved into a semiotic theory of human-computer interaction (HCI).

Semiotic Engineering views HCI as computer-mediated communication between designers and users at interaction time. The system speaks for its designers in various types of conversations specified at design time. These conversations communicate the designers' understanding of who the users are, what they know the users want or need to do, in which preferred ways, and why. The designers' message to users includes even the interactive language in which users will have to communicate back with the system in order to achieve their specific goals. So, the process is in fact one of communication about communication, or metacommunication.

Semiotic engineering has two methods to evaluate the quality of metacommunication in HCI: the semiotic inspection method (SIM) and the communicability evaluation method (CEM). In the 2009 book Semiotic Engineering Methods for Scientific Research in HCI, Clarisse de Souza and Carla Leitão discuss how SIM and CEM, which are both qualitative methods, can also be used in scientific contexts to generate new knowledge about HCI. To illustrate their points, the authors present an extensive case study with a free open-source digital audio editor called Audacity. They show how the results obtained with a triangulation of SIM and CEM point at new research avenues not only for semiotic engineering and HCI but also for other areas of computer science such as software engineering and programming.

René Jorna and Clarisse de Souza independently developed two different kinds of ‘semiotic engineering.’ Jorna's was originally closer to Artificial Intelligence and Cognitive Science. His ideas were later developed and applied to decision support systems and organizational semiotics rather than HCI. The authors were introduced to each other (and to each other's version of 'semiotic engineering') only in 1996, in a Dagstuhl Seminar on Informatics and Semiotics organized by Peter B. Andersen, Mihai Nadin and Frieder Nake.

== See also ==
- Computational semiotics
- Organisational semiotics
- Semiotic information theory
