= List of awards and nominations received by A Grande Família =

A Grande Família (English: Big Family) is a Brazilian television comedy, and is one of the most watched primetime shows. The show airs on the Globo Network, and tells the story of a typical lower middle-class family living in a suburb neighborhood of Rio de Janeiro.

The family consists of a working father, Lineu, a housewife and mother, Nenê, their son Tuco, their daughter Bebel, and Bebel's fiancée, Agostinho, a taxi driver portrayed as the typical carioca malandro. The family's grandfather, Floriano, was written out of the story after the death of actor Rogério Cardoso.

== Awards and nominations ==
It has won many different awards, including 7 Extra Awards, 3 Arte e Qualidade, one APCA award and a nomination for an Emmy Award for the role of actor Pedro Cardoso.

Year	Award	Category (in Portuguese)	Result
2001	Prêmio Qualidade Brasil	Televisão: Melhor Atriz de Sitcom para Marieta Severo	Won
2001	Prêmio Qualidade Brasil	Televisão: Melhor Ator de Sitcom para Marco Nanini	Won
2002	Prêmio Contigo	Melhor Seriado	Nominated
2002	Prêmio Contigo	Melhor Atriz Revelação para Guta Stresser	Nominated
2003	Prêmio Qualidade Brasil	Televisão: Melhor Humorístico	Nominated
2003	Prêmio Qualidade Brasil	Televisão: Melhor Atriz de Humorístico para Marieta Severo	Nominated
2003	Prêmio Qualidade Brasil	Televisão: Melhor Ator de Humorístico para Pedro Cardoso	Nominated
2003	Troféu APCA	Televisão: Melhor Humor	Won
2003	Troféu APCA	Televisão: Melhor Ator para Marco Nanini	Won
2003	Prêmio Contigo	Melhor Humorístico	Nominated
2003	Prêmio Contigo	Melhor Ator Cômico para Pedro Cardoso	Nominated
2003	Prêmio Extra	Programa Humorístico	Won
2004	Prêmio Qualidade Brasil	Televisão: Melhor Humorístico	Won
2004	Prêmio Qualidade Brasil	Televisão: Melhor Atriz de Humorístico para Marieta Severo	Won
2004	Prêmio Qualidade Brasil	Televisão: Melhor Ator de Humorístico para Pedro Cardoso	Won
2004	Prêmio Extra	Programa Humorístico	Won
2005	Prêmio Qualidade Brasil	Televisão: Melhor Ator de Humorístico para Lúcio Mauro Filho	Won
2005	Prêmio Qualidade Brasil	Televisão: Melhor Humorístico	Nominated
2005	Prêmio Qualidade Brasil	Televisão: Melhor Ator de Humorístico para Pedro Cardoso	Nominated
2005	Prêmio Extra	Programa Humorístico	Won
2006	Prêmio Qualidade Brasil	Televisão: Melhor Humorístico	Won
2006	Prêmio Qualidade Brasil	Televisão: Melhor Atriz de Humorístico para Andrea Beltrão	Won
2006	Prêmio Qualidade Brasil	Televisão: Melhor Ator de Humorístico para Pedro Cardoso	Won
2006	Prêmio Extra	Melhor Programa de Humor	Nominated
2007	Prêmio Qualidade Brasil	Televisão: Melhor Humorístico	Won
2007	Prêmio Qualidade Brasil	Televisão: Melhor Atriz de Humorístico para Marieta Severo	Won
2007	Prêmio Qualidade Brasil	Televisão: Melhor Ator de Humorístico para Pedro Cardoso	Won
2007	Prêmio Extra	Melhor Programa de Humor	Won
2008	Prêmio Qualidade Brasil	Televisão: Melhor Humorístico	Nominated
2008	Prêmio Qualidade Brasil	Televisão: Melhor Atriz de Humorístico para Marieta Severo	Nominated
2008	Prêmio Qualidade Brasil	Televisão: Melhor Ator de Humorístico para Pedro Cardoso	Nominated
2008	International Emmy	Melhor Ator para Pedro Cardoso	Nominated
2008	Prêmio Extra	Melhor Humorístico	Won
2009	Prêmio Contigo	Melhor Humorístico	Nominated
2009	Prêmio Contigo	Melhor Atriz Cômica para Andrea Beltrão	Nominated
2009	Prêmio Qualidade Brasil	Televisão: Melhor Humorístico	Nominated
2009	Prêmio Qualidade Brasil	Televisão: Melhor Atriz de Humorístico para Marieta Severo	Nominated
2009	Prêmio Qualidade Brasil	Televisão: Melhor Ator de Humorístico para Pedro Cardoso	Won
2010	Prêmio Qualidade Brasil	Televisão: Melhor Humorístico	Nominated
2010	Prêmio Qualidade Brasil	Televisão: Melhor Atriz de Humorístico para Marieta Severo	Nominated
2010	Prêmio Qualidade Brasil	Televisão: Melhor Atriz de Humorístico para Guta Stresser	Nominated
2010	Prêmio Qualidade Brasil	Televisão: Melhor Ator de Humorístico para Pedro Cardoso	Nominated
2010	Prêmio Contigo	Melhor Série/Minissérie	Nominated
2010	Prêmio Extra	Melhor Série	Won
2011	Prêmio Contigo	Melhor Série/Minissérie	Nominated
2011	Prêmio Contigo	Melhor Ator em Série/Minissérie para Pedro Cardoso	Nominated
2011	Prêmio Contigo	Melhor Atriz em Série/Minissérie para Marieta Severo	Nominated
2011	Prêmio Qualidade Brasil	Televisão: Melhor Ator de Série ou Projeto Especial para Evandro Mesquita	Nominated
2011	Prêmio Qualidade Brasil	Televisão: Melhor Série ou Projeto Especial	Nominated
2011	Prêmio Extra	Melhor Série	Nominated
2012	Prêmio Contigo	Melhor série/Minissérie	Nominated
2012	Prêmio Contigo	Melhor Ator em Série/Minissérie para Marco Nanini	Nominated
2012	Prêmio Contigo	Melhor Ator em Série/Minissérie para Guta Stresser	Nominated
2012	Prêmio Extra	Humor	Nominated
