= Lulism =

Brazilian political ideology named after Luiz Inácio Lula da Silva

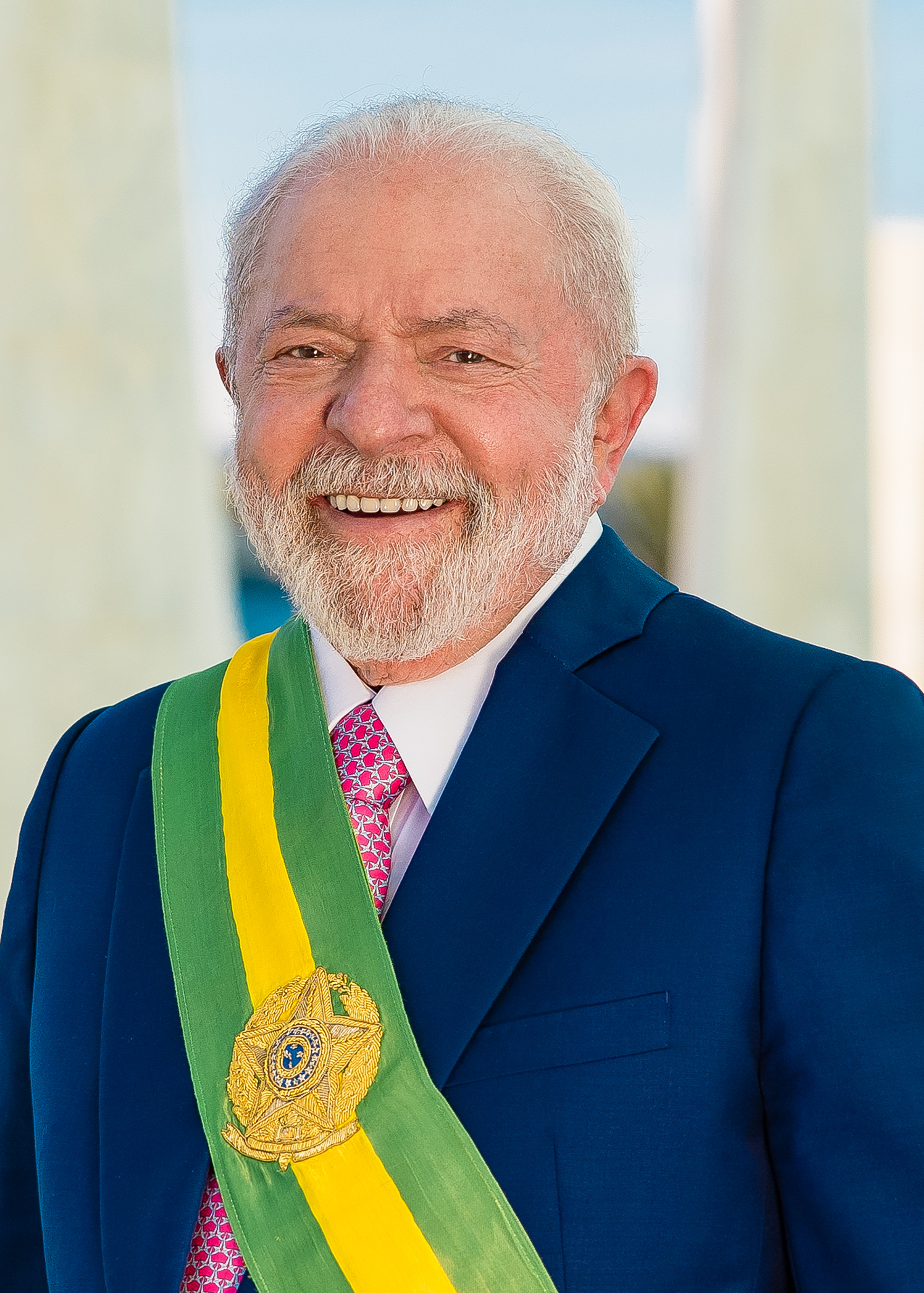
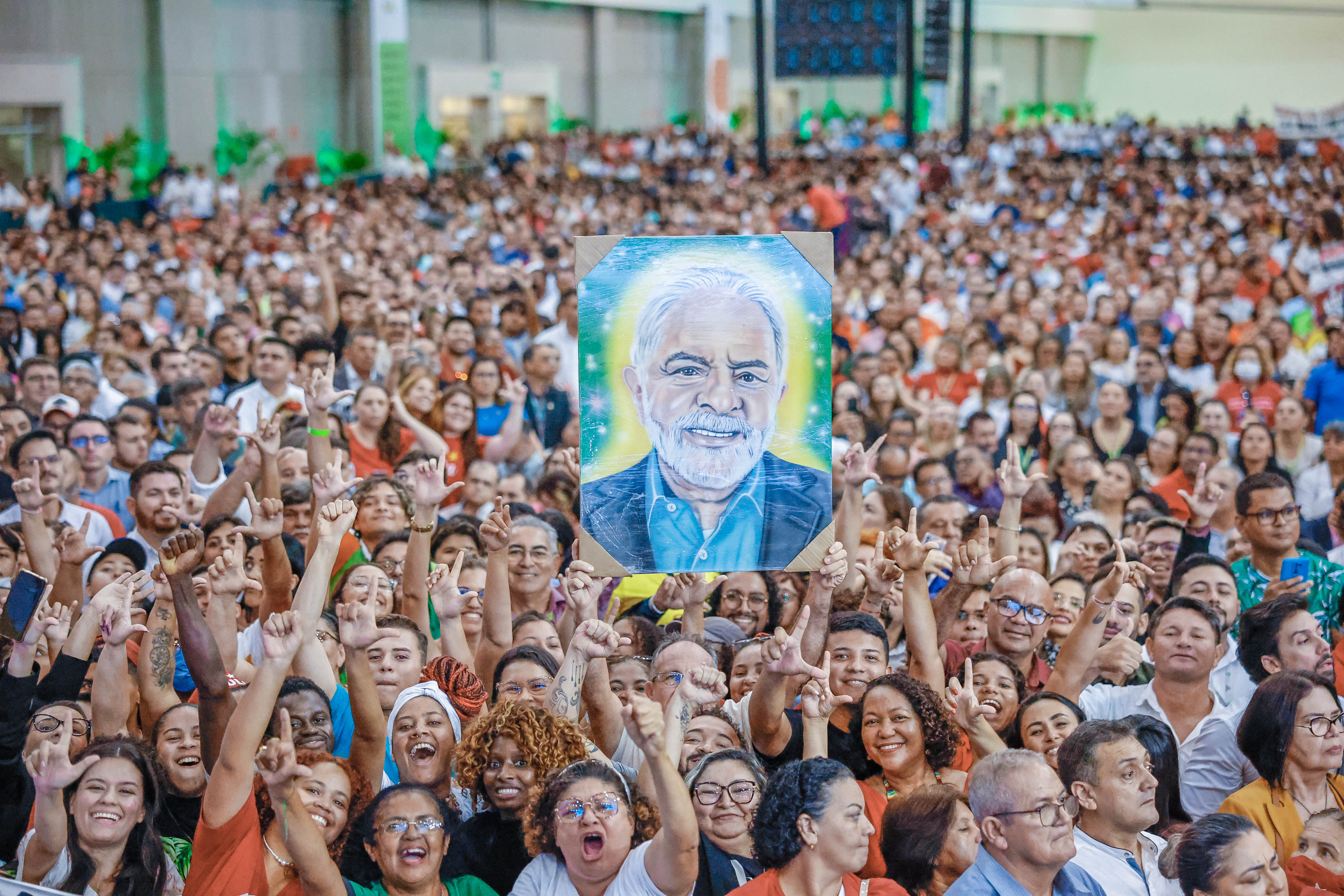
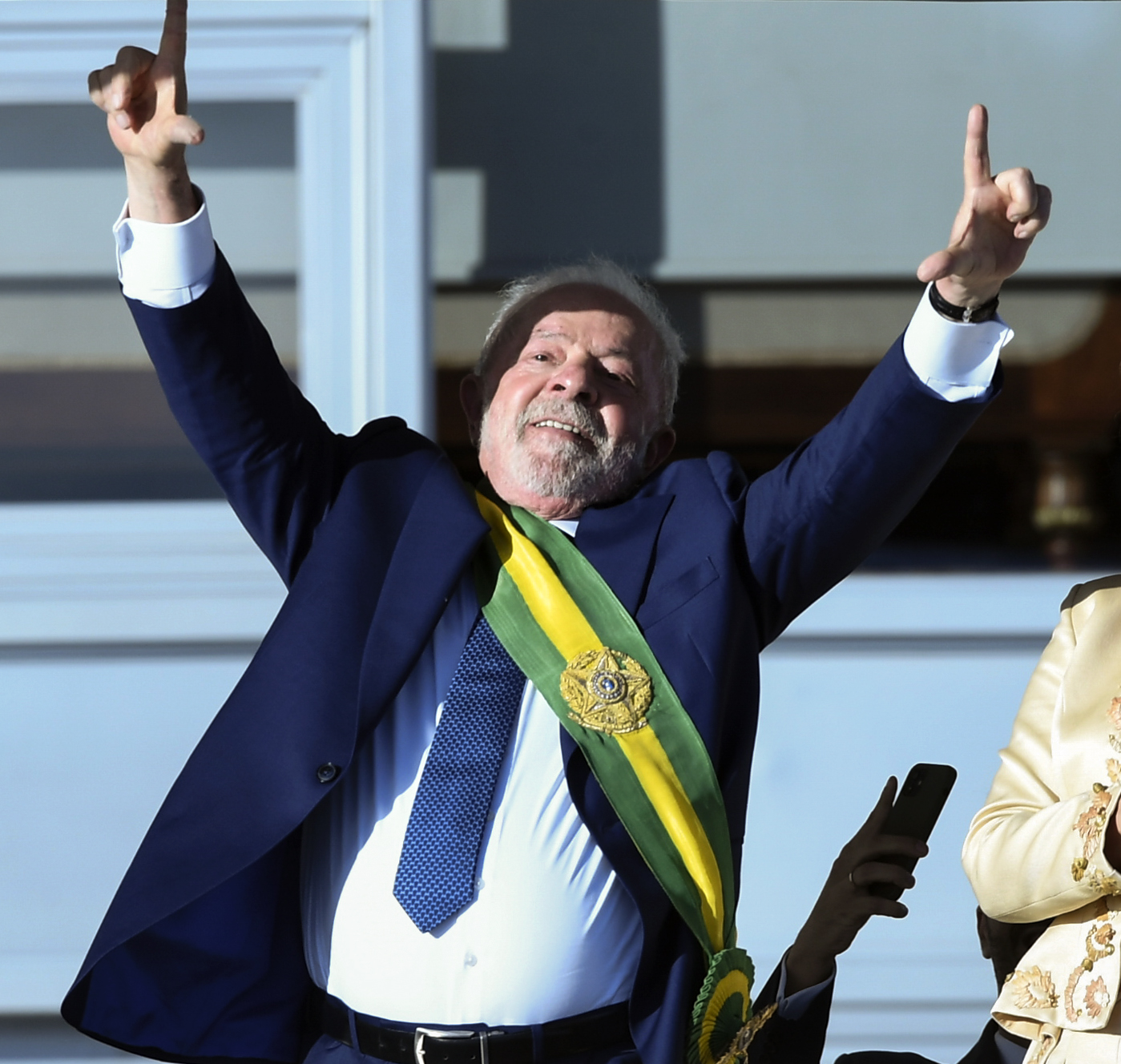
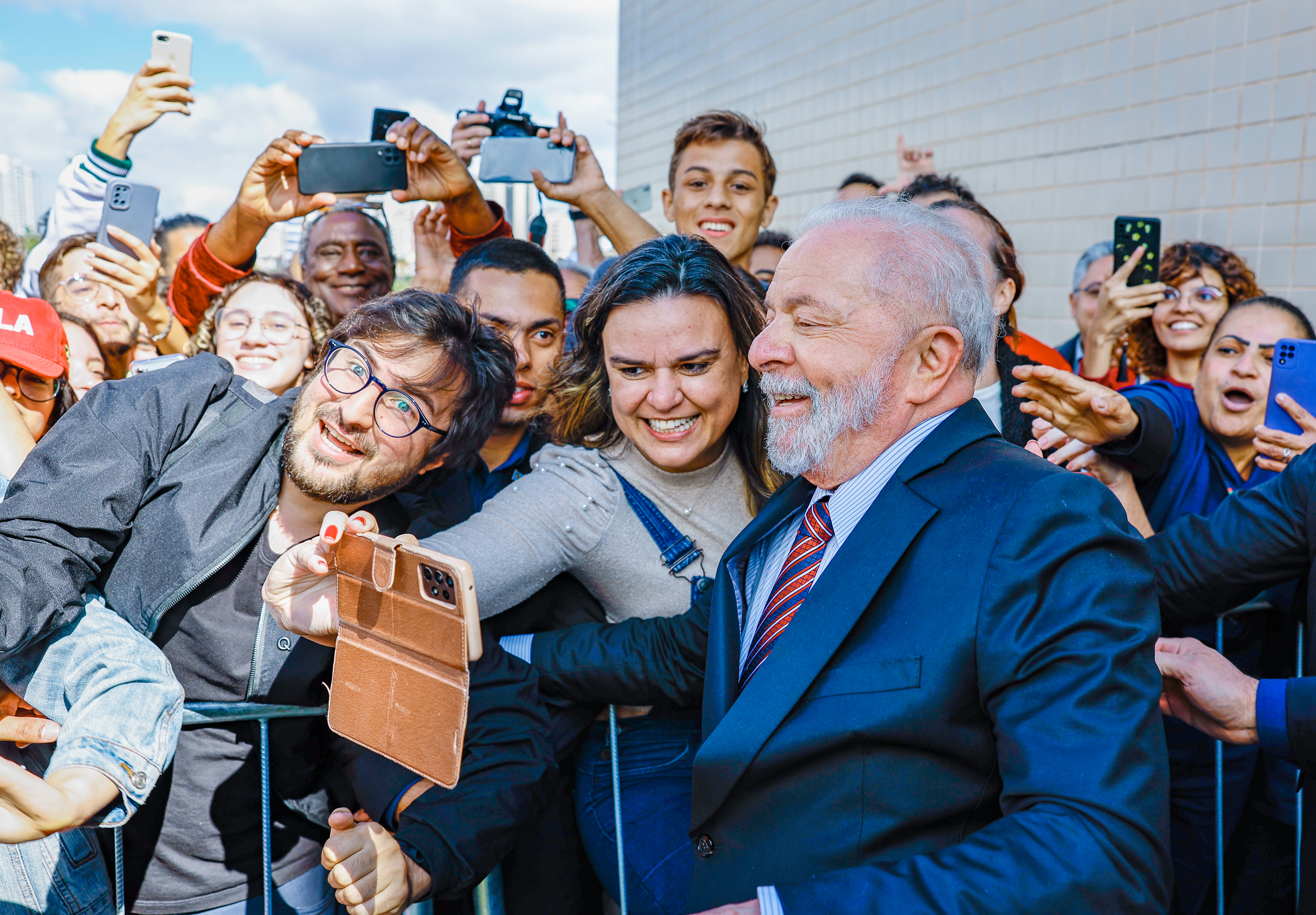
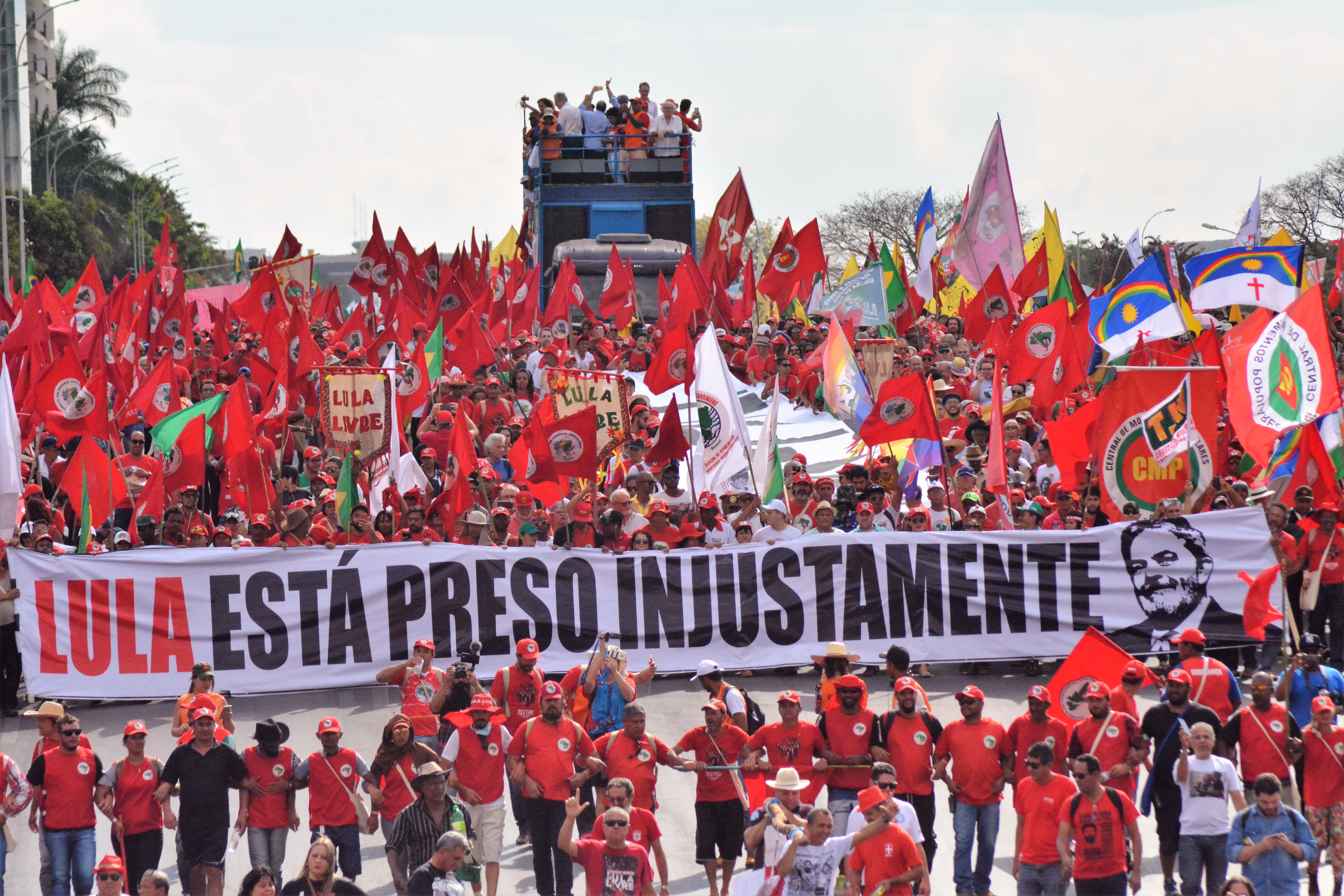
From left to right, top to bottom:
- Official portrait of Lula as President, taken in 2023
- Crowd of Lula supporters in Fortaleza
- Lula making his well-known "Faz o L" gesture
- Lula taking pictures with supporters at São Bernardo do Campo
- Demonstration by the Workers' Party following the registration of Lula's candidacy

Lulism (Portuguese: Lulismo) is a political ideology describing the 2006 consolidation of segments of Brazilian society previously hostile to social movements and the Workers' Party behind political forces led by President Luiz Inácio Lula da Silva, appealed by a controlled reformism and limited structural change focused on the poorest sections of society. The lower classes, who had distanced themselves from Lula, accepted his candidacy after his first term as President as the middle class turned from him. The rhetoric and praxis that united the maintenance of stability and state distributism are the origins of Lulism. While advocating socialism, Lulism aims for a 'social liberal' approach that gradually resolves the gap between the rich and the poor in a market-oriented way. Lulism also advocates for alter-globalization.

Brazilian manufacturers, banks and retailers benefited from the consumption-led and credit-fueled government economic model. According to André Singer, who coined the term: "The convergence of interests of the private industry sector on one side, and of the organized labor force on the other, led to the stability that allowed this political system to take the form of a sort of consensus". This equilibrium allowed the government to gradually make significant changes in policy. In the Lulism movement, non-confrontation is a sine qua non for development. It is part of the Latin American leftist wave known as Socialism of the 21st century. Besides this it is also part of Third Way politics.

== Evolution ==
The word Lulism was coined by André Singer, a political scientist and Lula's press secretary from 2003 to 2005 and spokesperson during his presidency from 2002 to 2007. Originating in the 2002 presidential campaign, Lulism departed from the left-wing politics of the Workers' Party until late 2001 and abandoned the concepts of organization and mobilization. Since Lulism is a model of enforced change within order, mobilization is unnecessary, and conflict is eliminated.

A 2009 article written for the Instituto Millenium said that "liberals are cornered" after "more than six years of Lulism". Patrícia Carlos de Andrade adopted that view: "According to her, the term 'liberal' is mistranslated in Brazil as 'rightist' or 'supportive of military dictatorships'. In the war for public opinion, the so-called left always got the better, Singer says". Lula da Silva has also been described in media and books as a "liberal" in the sense of social rather than classical. Other sources describe Lula as a social democrat or as democratic socialist.

Besides its progressivism, Lulism sought reconciliation between Lula and the large Brazilian conservative sector. Ironically, it is a conservative social pact combining the economic policy of Fernando Henrique Cardoso (1995–2003) with the distributive policies of Lula's government (2002–2010).

Under the auspices of conciliation, Lulism represents an "appeasement of social conflicts, of which the bourgeoisie has always [been] too afraid, especially in a country of great inequality as is the case of Brazil" because it envisions a "reduction-agenda poverty and inequality, but under the aegis of a weak reformism". This social change model is explained as a "conservative variant of modernization" in which the state has a "prominent role in leveraging the poorest", ensuring that Brazilian social structural problems will not be touched (in other words, without conflicting with the financial interests of the conservative elite). Lulism "concocted new ideological, under-union banners that seemed to combine" continuity of the Lula and Cardoso governments in macroeconomic policy based on three pillars, namely inflation control, a floating exchange rate and a budgetary surplus.

Another feature distinguishing Lulism as a political movement is its nonpartisan character. It overlaps the political parties, including the Workers' Party founded by Lula.

With later events in Brazilian politics, such as the impeachment of Dilma Rousseff, the arrest of Lula on 7 April 2018 and President Michel Temer's reform of labour laws, some political commentators are arguing for a second phase of Lulism, now more radical and more left-orientated.

== Economics ==
In terms of economics, Lulism is supportive of pragmatic capitalism, keynesianism, developmentalism and neo-developmentalism.

== Legacy ==
Several Latin American politicians such as Ollanta Humala, José Mujica, Mauricio Funes, and Fernando Lugo have cited Lulism and Chavism as political models and alternatives to the Washington Consensus.

== See also ==
- Free Lula movement
- Liberalism in Brazil
- Third Way in Brazil
- History of the socialist movement in Brazil
- BRICS
- Bolsonarism
