= Carlos José Pereira de Lucena =

Brazilian computer scientist

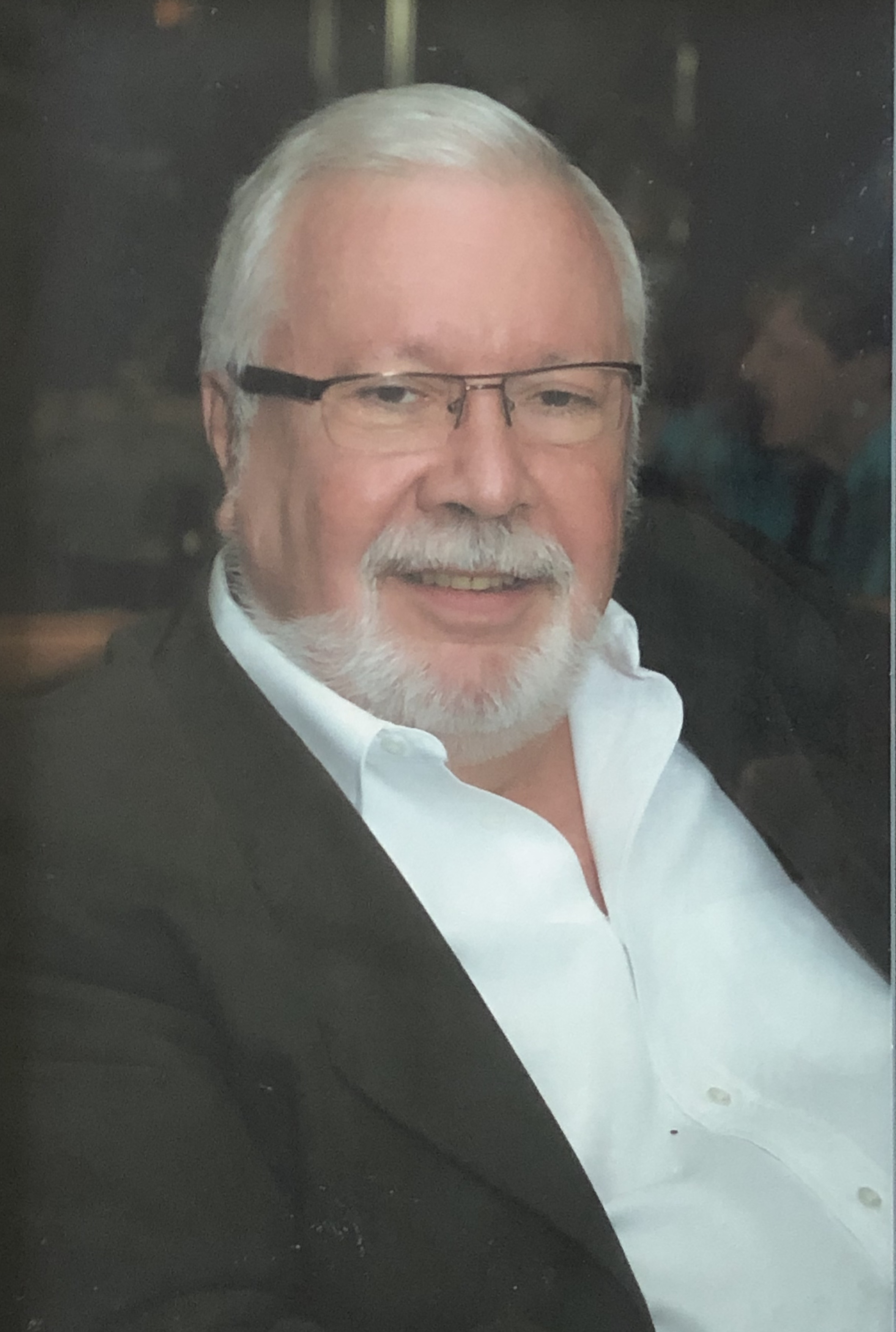
- Born: 30 September 1943
- Awards: Guggenheim Fellowship (1978); ACM Distinguished Member (2009); ACM Fellow (For contributions in software engineering and multiagent systems, and for computer science leadership in Brazil, 2013, 2013)
- Website: www-di.inf.puc-rio.br/~lucena/bio.html
- Academic career
- Institutions: Pontifical Catholic University of Rio de Janeiro
- Doctoral advisor: Gerald Estrin
- Doctoral students: Roberto Ierusalimschy, Leonardo de Moura, Anarosa Alves Franco Brandão
- Notable students: Ingrid Oliveira de Nunes

Carlos José Pereira de Lucena (born September 30, 1943) is a Brazilian computer science researcher. He is one of the pioneers of computer science research in Brazil, having worked on the first computer in Latin America, and being a founding member of the Brazilian Computer Society. As of 2018, Lucena's research work has had over 9,500 citations.

== Early life and education ==
Lucena was born in Recife, Pernambuco in 1943. His parents moved to Rio de Janeiro when he was 2 years old. In 1965, he got a bachelor's degree in Economics with emphasis in Mathematics at the Pontifical Catholic University of Rio de Janeiro (PUC-Rio).

He continued his studies abroad, obtaining a M.Sc. in Computer Science and Applied Analysis at the University of Waterloo in 1969, and a Ph.D. in Computer Science at the University of California at Los Angeles (UCLA) in 1974. In 1975, he did post-doc research at IBM Research in the United States.

== Academic work ==
He is one of the founders of the Informatics Department at PUC-Rio, in Rio de Janeiro, where he is the director of the Software Engineering Lab.

Lucena has advised over 45 doctorate theses and 120 masters dissertations, and he has authored or coauthored over 700 papers.

He was a member of the National Council for Science and Technology of the Federal Government, representing the Brazilian Academy of Sciences for two terms.

In the late 1970s, he was one of the founders, in Valparaíso, Chile of the Latin American Center for Informatics Studies (CLEI), which he chaired for two years. In the late 1980s, at the request of the University of the United Nations, he helped create in China the International Institute for Software Engineering, headquartered in Macau. Luena was also adjunct professor at University of Waterloo and an associate researcher at Fraunhofer Institute FIRST in Berlin.

Lucena was the first academic to adopt the term "informática" in Portuguese, adapting it from the French "informatique", as an alternative to "ciência da computação", derived from the English "computer science".

== Awards ==
Throughout his career spanning over 50 years, Lucena has received over 60 prizes and awards.

In 2014 Lucena was made an ACM Fellow, following his previous ACM Distinguished Scientist award in 2009. He is also a Guggenheim Fellow, and a fellow of the World Academy of Sciences.

In Brazil, Lucena has received honors from the federal government twice: in the late 80s, president José Sarney awarded him the Álvaro Alberto Prize for Science and Technology. In 1996, president Fernando Henrique Cardoso awarded him the insignia of the National Order of Scientific Merit.
