= Roberto Ierusalimschy =

Brazilian computer scientist (born 1960)

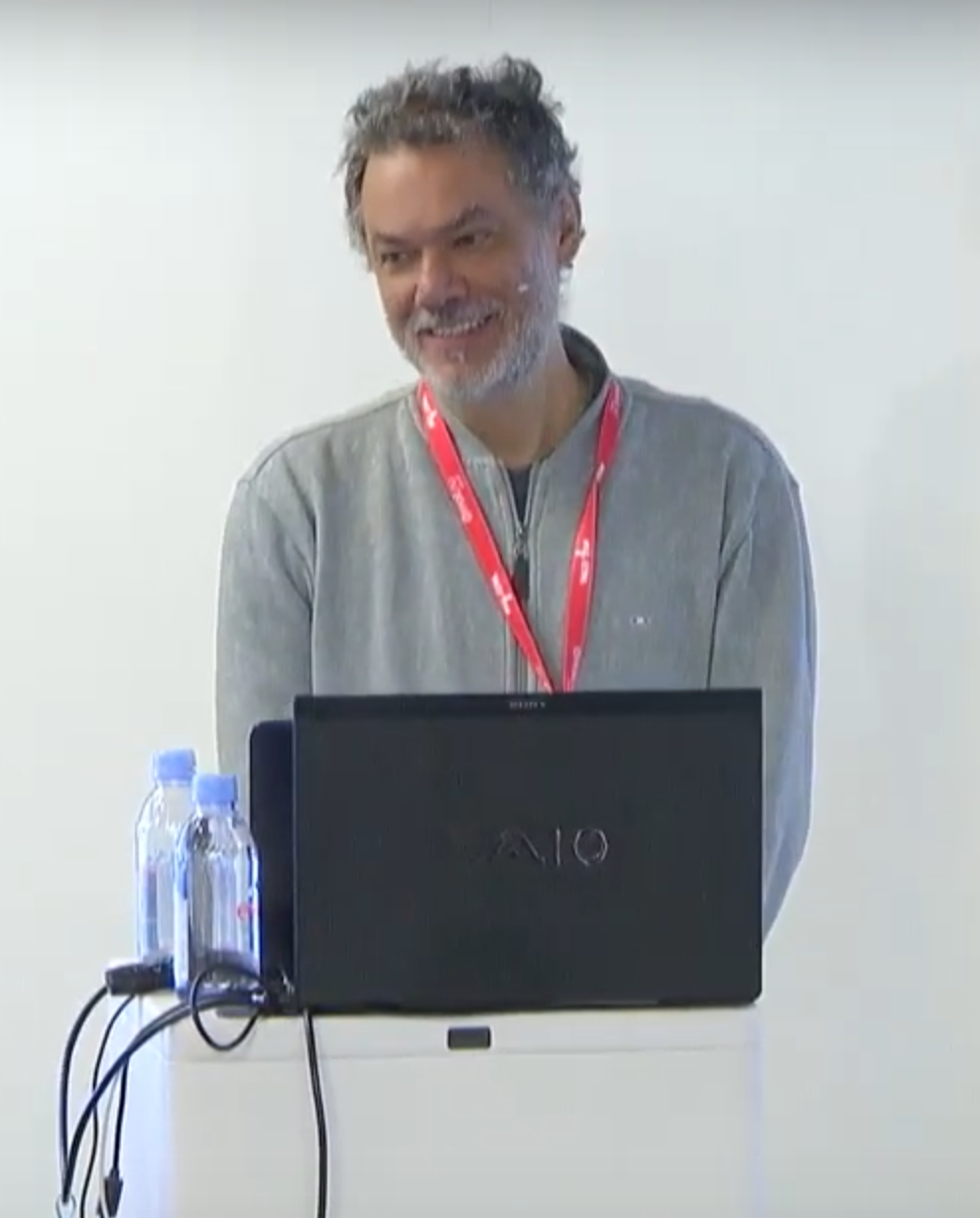
- Ierusalimschy speaking at Lua conference in Moscow, 2017
- Born: 21 May 1960 (age 66); Rio de Janeiro, Brazil
- Education: Pontifical Catholic University of Rio de Janeiro (PUC-Rio)
- Known for: Lua
- Scientific career
- Fields: Computer Science Programming Languages
- Workplaces: Pontifical Catholic University of Rio de Janeiro (PUC-Rio)
- Thesis: O=M : uma linguagem orientada a objetos para desenvolvimento rigoroso de programas (in Portuguese) (1990)
- Doctoral advisor: Carlos José Pereira de Lucena

Roberto Ierusalimschy (Brazilian Portuguese: [ʁoˈbɛʁtu jeɾuzaˈlĩski]; born 21 May 1960) is a Brazilian computer scientist, known for creating the Lua programming language. He holds a PhD in computer science from the Pontifical Catholic University of Rio de Janeiro where he has an appointment as a full professor of informatics. He did a post-doc at University of Waterloo in 1992 and was visiting professor at Stanford University in 2012. He is the leading architect and the author of Programming in Lua. He also created LPeg, a Lua library for implementing parsing expression grammars.

In 2021, Roberto created Building a Programming Language, a project-based learning program where students learn how to build a programming language from scratch.
