= Alexandre Schwartsman =

Brazilian economist

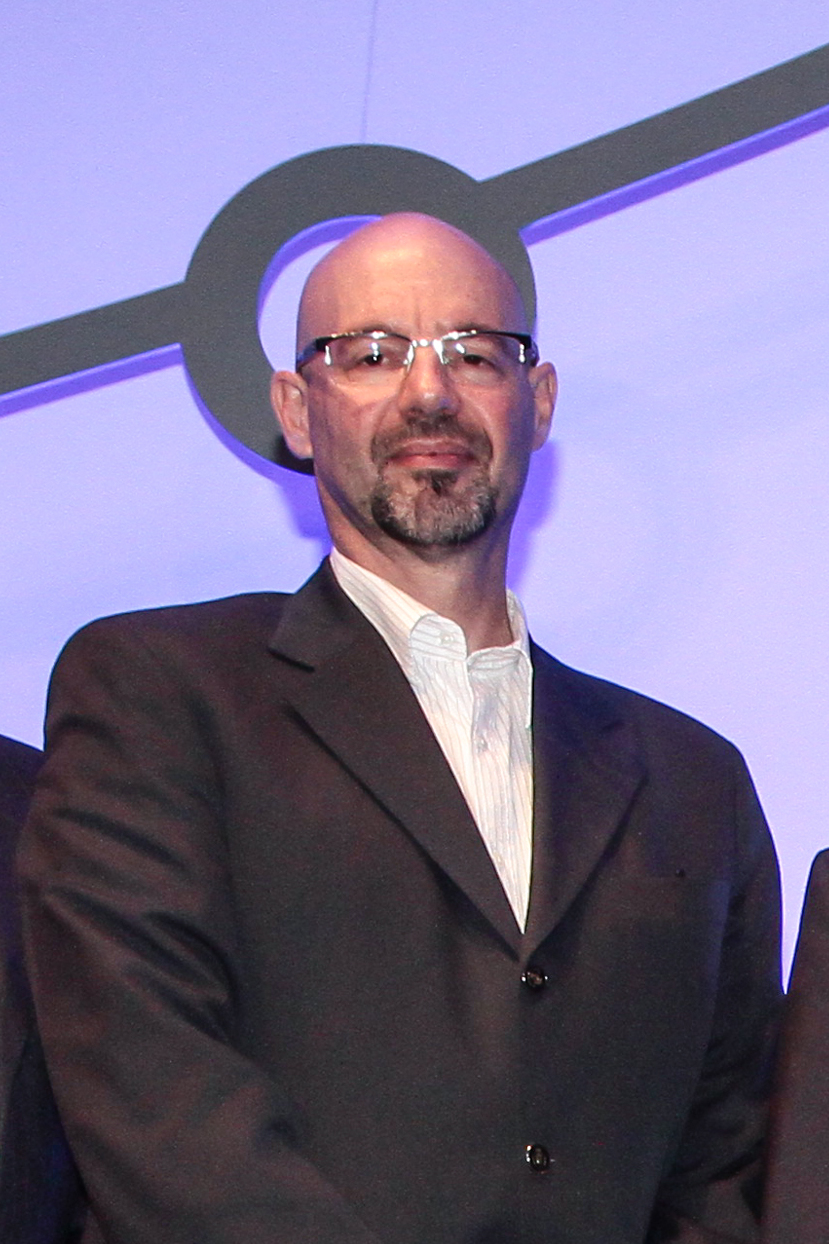
- Born: February 7, 1963 (age 63); São Paulo, SP

Academic background
- Education: Fundação Getulio Vargas-SP (B.Sc.) 1984; University of São Paulo (M.Sc.) 1986; University of California, Berkeley (Ph.D.) 2000

Academic work
- Discipline: Economics
- School or tradition: New neoclassical synthesis
- Institutions: Viver S.A. (2011–present)

Alexandre Schwartsman is a Brazilian economist, former Director of International Affairs of the Central Bank of Brazil.

== Academic life ==
Schwartsman graduated in Management from Fundação Getulio Vargas of São Paulo (FGV-SP), earned a Bachelor's degree and Master's degree in Economics from the University of São Paulo, and earned a Doctorate in Economics from University of California, Berkeley.

== Career ==
Between 1999 and 2001, Schwartsman was chief economist at Crédit Agricole Indosuez, and from 2001 to 2002 at the BBA Corretora. In 2003, Schwartsman succeeded Beny Parnes in the International Affairs Directorate of the Central Bank of Brazil, where he remained until 2006. Between 2006 and 2008 he was chief economist for Latin America at ABN AMRO Bank, and from 2008 to 2011 he held the same position at Grupo Santander Brasil. Currently, in addition to being managing partner of Schwartsman & Associados Consultoria Econômica, he writes the weekly column "Opinião Econômica" for the newspaper Folha de S.Paulo and a monthly column for the Valor Econômico. He is a columnist at Rádio CBN and CNN Brazil. His cousin, Hélio Schwartsman, is also a columnist at Folha.

== Controversies ==
Schwartsman is known for his acid criticism on the economic policies of the Brazilian government. His dismissal from Santander in 2011 was just attributed to his style, which some in the financial institution regarded as "aggressive" and "arrogant." Officially, Santander reported that the changes in its economic management aimed to "allow the bank to continue to grow." Schwartsman defended himself from the accusations, by denying the authorship of sharp criticisms about the Brazilian government, published on his own blog by a supposed "Anonymous."

In March 2013, Schwartsman issued another controversial opinion stating that a supposed lack of control over inflation by the Brazilian government could only be solved by increasing the interest rate, even if that meant layoffs. This at a time when the unemployment rate in Brazil has reached one of its lowest historical levels (5.4% in January 2013, according to IBGE).
