= Rodrigo R. Soares =

Brazilian economist

Academic background
- Education: Federal University of Minas Gerais (BA); Pontifical Catholic University of Rio de Janeiro (MA); University of Chicago (PhD)
- Doctoral advisor: Gary Becker

Academic work
- Discipline: Development economics
- Institutions: Columbia University
- Website: Information at IDEAS / RePEc

Rodrigo Reis Soares is an economist specializing in development economics. He is Lemann Professor of Brazilian Public Policy and International and Public Affairs at Columbia University and the Lemann Foundation Chair at Insper.

== Biography ==
Soares received his B.A. from the Federal University of Minas Gerais, M.A. from the Pontifical Catholic University of Rio de Janeiro, and Ph.D. from the University of Chicago under the guidance of Gary Becker. Soares taught at the University of Maryland, College Park, Harvard School of Public Health, Pontifical Catholic University of Rio de Janeiro, and São Paulo School of Economics before joining the Columbia faculty in 2016. He was also named Lemann Foundation Chair at Insper in 2020.

Soares has written about health economics and the economics of crime, domestic violence, labor, and the effect of history and institutions on development. He argued that different structures of colonial rule that characterized Brazil's sugarcane and gold mining industries had lasting influence on the strength and weakness of institutions and perceivable social inequities in present-day Brazil.

He was elected a fellow of the Econometric Society in 2020. Soares was awarded the Kenneth J. Arrow Award from the International Health Economics Association for the best paper published in the field of health economics.
