= André Vítor Singer =

Brazilian professor

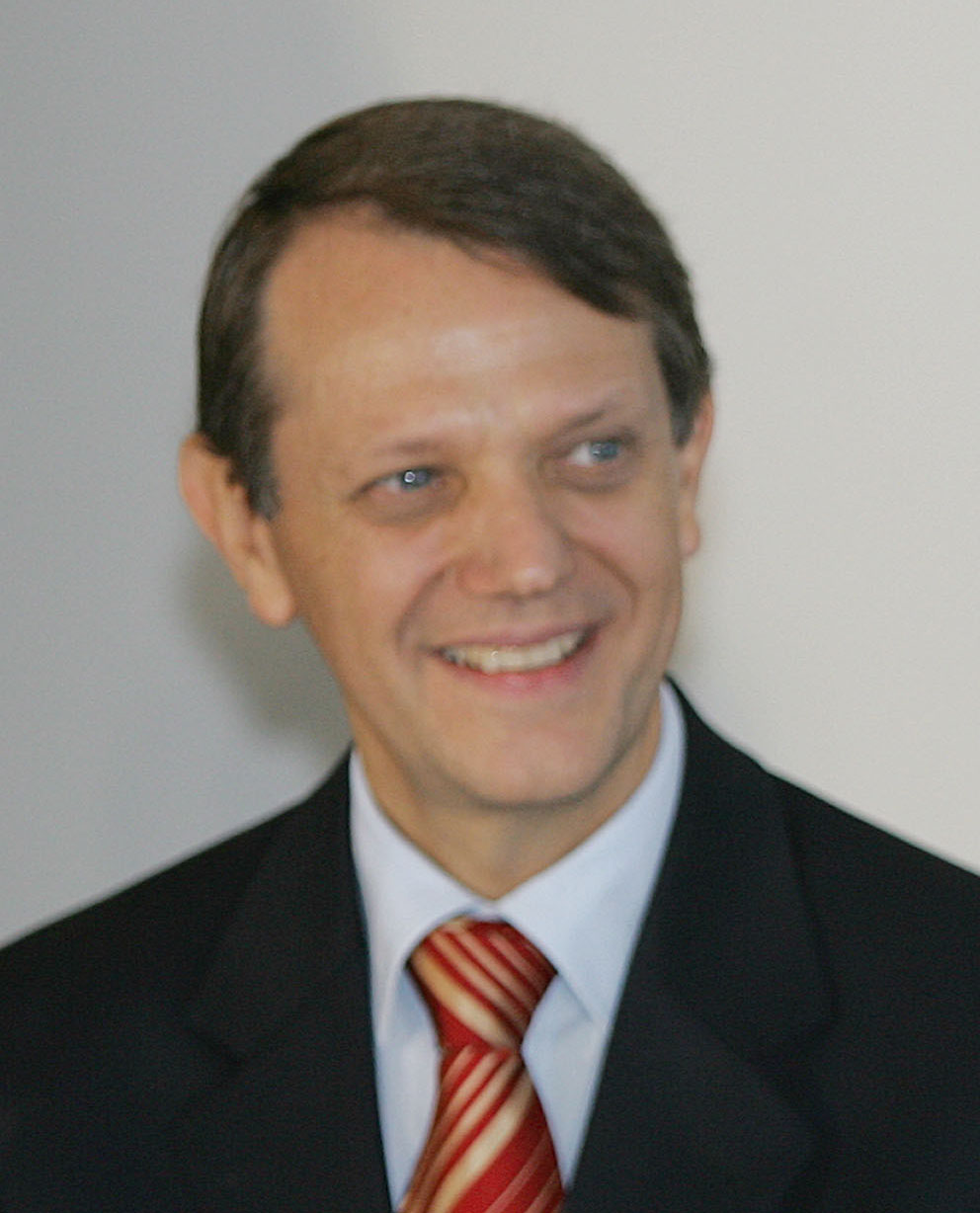
André Singer

André Vítor Singer (born 1958) is a political sciences professor at the University of São Paulo and the former press secretary of the Lula administration. He is known for his description of lulism as a political phenomenon and as one of the theorists of the Brasília Consensus.

Born in São Paulo, Singer graduated in social sciences in 1980 and in journalism 1986, both by the Universidade of São Paulo. He earned his Master's (1993), Doctoral (1998) and docent (2011) degrees in social sciences all by the same university.

He was press secretary of the newspaper Folha de S.Paulo (1987–88), Secretary of Media of the Palácio do Planalto (2005–2007) and spokesperson of the president of Brazil in the first term of Lula's government (2003–2007).

== Bibliography ==
- Singer, André (1999). Esquerda e direita no eleitorado brasileiro: a identificação ideológica nas disputas presidenciais de 1989 e 1994. EdUSP. ISBN 978-85-314-0524-2.
- Singer, André (30 August 2012). Os sentidos do lulismo. Companhia das Letras. ISBN 978-85-8086-358-1.
