= Beny Parnes =

- Born: May 24, 1959 (age 67); Rio de Janeiro

Academic background
- Education: Pontifical Catholic University of Rio de Janeiro (B.Sc.) 1987; University of Pennsylvania (PhD) 1990

Academic work
- Discipline: Economics
- School or tradition: Economic liberalism
- Institutions: Banco BBM (1997–present)

Beny Parnes (Portuguese pronunciation: [beˈni ˈpaʁ.nis]; born May 24, 1959) is a Brazilian economist, former Director for International Affairs of the Central Bank of Brazil. He was married to Patrícia Carlos de Andrade, with whom he had three children.

== Academic life ==
Parnes graduated in economics in the early 1980s at the Pontifical Catholic University of Rio de Janeiro, where he was a colleague of Armínio Fraga (BC's president between 1999 and 2002). From 1986 to 1987, he got his master's degree in economics from the same institution, and then went with his family to the United States, where he earned a doctorate at the University of Pennsylvania, specializing in macroeconomics and international finances.

== Career ==
Upon returning to Brazil in 1991, Parnes went working to the BBM Bank of Rio de Janeiro. From 1994 to 1995 he was employee of the Matrix Bank, but then returned to BBM.

On November 27, 2001, he was invited by Armínio Fraga to become Director for International Affairs of the Central Bank of Brazil (a position that Fraga himself had held between 1991 and 1992), replacing Daniel Gleizer. Parnes was sworn in January 2002 and remained in office during the transition (2002–2003) of the Fernando Henrique Cardoso government to the Luiz Inácio Lula da Silva.

On September 10, 2003, citing personal reasons, Parnes sent his resignation to the Finance Minister, Antonio Palocci. The economist Alexandre Schwartsman was appointed for the position.

In 2004, Parnes returned to the Banco BBM, where he remains to date.

In 2007, he was elected "Best Specialist Manager of the Year" and "Best Specialist Manager of Leveraged Funds", by the Exame magazine.
