= Clarisse de Souza =

Brazilian academic

Clarisse Sieckenius de Souza
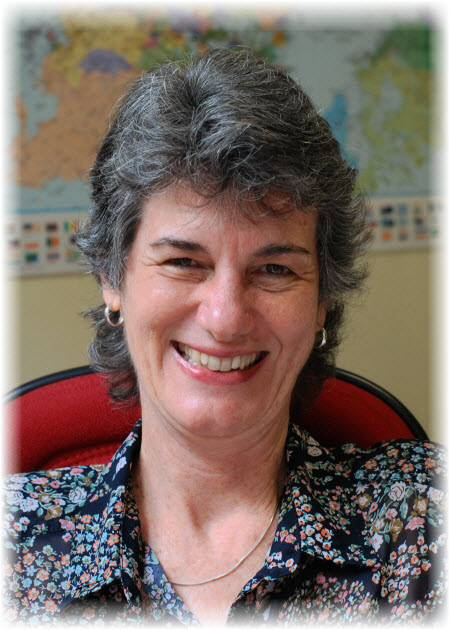
- Education: Pontifical Catholic University of Rio de Janeiro
- Known for: Semiotic engineering
- Awards: Rigo Award (2010); CHI Academy (2013); 2014 IFIP TC13 Pioneer in HCI (awarded during INTERACT2015 (2014)
- Scientific career
- Fields: Computer Science; Human–computer interaction
- Workplaces: Pontifical Catholic University of Rio de Janeiro
- Website: www.inf.puc-rio.br/~clarisse

Clarisse Sieckenius de Souza is a full professor at the Informatics Department of Pontifical Catholic University of Rio de Janeiro (PUC-Rio), where she does research in the area of human–computer interaction (HCI) and has developed the theory of Semiotic Engineering.

She is the founder of SERG (Semiotic Engineering Research Group) at Pontifical Catholic University of Rio de Janeiro (PUC-Rio).

== Biography ==
Souza got her bachelor's degree in languages (with a focus on translation-interpretation) in 1979, a master's degree in Portuguese language in 1982 and a doctorate degree in applied linguistics in 1988, all by the Pontifical Catholic University of Rio de Janeiro and only after she joined the department of informatics of PUC-Rio, where she became a professor in 2006. Throughout her career, she made various internships for its post-doctorate and as a visitor researcher in American and Canadian universities like Stanford University and the University of Waterloo, and in 1991 she initiated her own research about semiotic engineering, with it creating the SERG in 1996. In 2010 she was the co-winner of the ACM SIGDOC Rigo Award an in 2013 she was inducted to the ACM SIGCHI CHI Academy. She is also one of the co-winners of the IFIP TC13 Pioneers of HCI Award in 2014 and in 2016 she was the winner of the Scientific Merit Award of the Brazilian Computer Society. Clarisse is also one of CRA-W / Anita Borg Institute's Notable Women in Computing featured in Jessica Dickinson Goodman's cad deck and poster.

== Publications ==
She has three international books on the topic of semiotic engineering:

- The Semiotic Engineering of Human–Computer Interaction (MIT Press, 2005)
- Semiotic Engineering Methods for Scientific Research in HCI (Morgan & Claypool, 2009 - with Carla Leitão)
- A Journey through Cultures (Springer, 2012 - with Luciana Salgado and Carla Leitão)
- Software Developers as Users (Springer, 2016 - with Renato Cerqueira, Luiz Marques, Rafael Brandão and Juliana Ferreira)
