= Rodrigo Constantino =

Brazilian writer, columnist and political commentator

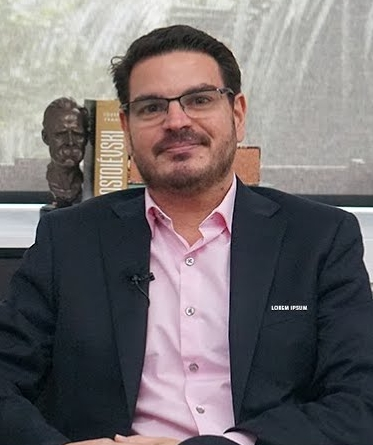
- Rodrigo Constantino in 2020
- Born: Rodrigo Constantino dos Santos; 4 July 1976 (age 50); Rio de Janeiro, Brazil
- Education: Pontifical Catholic University of Rio de Janeiro (1998); Ibmec Business School (MBA, 2000)
- Awards: Libertas Award (2009)

Rodrigo Constantino dos Santos (born 4 July 1976) is a Brazilian economist, writer, columnist, and political commentator.

He is the president of the Brazilian Liberal Institute and a founding member of the Instituto Millennium. He collaborated with important media such as Veja, Valor Econômico, O Globo, Isto é, currently is a political commentator for Jovem Pan and writes a daily column for Gazeta do Povo. Among the many books he has written include the best seller Esquerda Caviar; Contra a maré vermelha and Confissões de um ex-libertário. Since 2015 Constantino resides in the United States, in the city of Weston, Florida.

Rodrigo is known for his extreme conservative views, being one of the main references in Brazilian journalism in far-right.

== Academic life ==
Constantino graduated in 1998 from the Pontifical Catholic University of Rio de Janeiro (PUC-RJ), and in 2000 obtained a Master of Business Administration (MBA) in Finance from Ibmec in Rio de Janeiro.

== Career ==
President of the Instituto Liberal and one of the founders of Instituto Millenium, he was considered in 2012 by the magazine Época one of the "new trombones of the right" in Brazil. He was a director of Graphus Capital between 2005 and 2013.

He worked in the financial market from 1997 to 2013, having been an analyst at FonteCindam bank between 1997 and 1999.

He was a writer for the magazine Voto and wrote regularly for the newspapers Valor Econômico and O Globo. He has a blog where he writes daily, and since 2016 he has been a columnist for Istoé magazine.

In August 2013, he started to write for the magazine Veja. In 2015, he was fired by Editora Abril and subsequently had all the articles on his blog, produced for two years, removed from the magazine's website.

=== Controversial Statements About Rape Case and Dismiss ===
In November 2020, Constantino was dismissed from Jovem Pan, following controversial statements about the rape case of Brazilian blogger Mariana Ferrer, which gained national repercussion. Constantino statements were widely criticized by the media that accused him of being an apology for the rapist, in addition to victim blaming. The following day, he was also fired from Grupo Record, where he had a column on the R7 portal, in addition to being a commentator for Record News. Rádio Guaíba and the newspaper Correio do Povo also confirmed his dismissal. Two months after the incident, Jovem Pan revised its decision and rehired Constantino as political commentator for one of the network's daily programs, "Pingos nos Is" and later to return to its original program, "3 in 1". Constantino writes a daily column for the Gazeta do Povo newspaper and hosts the "Tudo Consta" lives on Mondays and Wednesdays on YouTube.

On January 10, 2023, Jovem Pan decided to remove Rodrigo Constantino and the commentator and partner of Donald Trump, Paulo Figueiredo. The decision came after the Federal Public Ministry of São Paulo opened an investigation against the channel for supporting the coup acts, which occurred in the Brazilian Congress attack on January 8, 2023, on the Three Powers Plaza, in Brasília, Brazil.

== Political views ==
=== "Racist holiday" ===
In a 2007 article titled "Feriado racista" ("Racist holiday"), Constantino criticized the existence in Brazil of Black Awareness Day, although this is not a national holiday (but that has been implemented in some states, such as Rio de Janeiro). He illustrated his view remembering Martin Luther King Jr. and his "I Have a Dream" speech, which condemns racism, as for Constantino, this holiday can be considered racist. Constantino says that "Brazil is a country with a recordist number of holidays, as our country isn't rich enough to have that luxury." He believes that, in Brazil, politicians always focus on minority groups, seeking to guarantee privileges in exchange for votes. About the people of the country, he claims that "people do not care about the amount of holidays because it is one more lazy day for a people who idolizes sloth."

Constantino in particular cites King's quote of "it's my dream that my four children would one day live in a nation where they would not be judged by the color of their skin, but by the content of character", claiming that in Brazil the opposite has been going on, and "people would be taking advantage of his black condition to get privileges, wanting to be judged by the color of their skin and not by character." He gives as an example the implementation of racial quotas in Brazilian universities and the establishment of black holidays, saying: "This is what they are encouraging in the country: totally abandon of the concepts of individual merit, and adopt the skin color criterion, still subject to gross errors like white people who claim to be black, and still manage to enter into Brazil's universities by racial quotas. Whether the individual is black, yellow, brown or white, it says absolutely nothing about their values and character. There are admirable blacks and perfidious blacks, as well as admirable whites and perfidious whites. But nobody is brave just for being black, because there is no moral choice about it. This would be like admiring someone for being tall or short. It makes no sense."

Constantino concludes the article claiming that the adoption of this type of holiday in Brazil would be part of a "traditional leftist strategy", "inflating the class struggle" between the inhabitants of the country. He says: "the left loves to spread hatred between groups, preaching the struggle between employers and employees, blacks and whites, women and men, heterosexual and homosexual. Our left looks like a vulture, who lives in carrion of others, and propagate ideas which divide rather than unite. Soon, may suggest the 'Gay Awareness Day', or maybe the 'Day of Proletarian Consciousness'. A typical leftist can not judge individuals alone, always calling for tribalist collectivism. And so left will spreading a climate of constant dispute between groups, ignoring that those acts, in fact, are always individuals. It's in this context that we have the 'Black Awareness Day', a totally racist holiday."

=== Privatization of Petrobras ===
In a text published at the newspaper "O Globo" in 2012, Constantino defends the privatization of Petrobras, considered by him as an ineffective company, and argues that "the political use of Petrobras has cost increasingly more to their investors, whose interests are ignored by the government. He cites that Petrobras, which had U$26.7 billion of net debt in 2007, ended the first half of 2012 owing more than U$130 billion, and that its return on equity does not reach 10%, half of the average of their international peers, and that since 2009, its shares fell 5%.

Constantino also mentions an "oil curse": that countries that have oil production much above its consumption, and its economy based on exporting oil, usually have their wealth extremely poorly distributed (which he argues are "usually concentrated in the hands of a small elite, which becomes totalitarian"), and do not develop other economic potentials due to the ease that too much oil extraction provides, as is the case with almost all countries of OPEC. He cites "countries like Venezuela, Mexico, Iran, Saudi Arabia, Nigeria and Russia have state companies controlling oil exploration. No one would dare say that it did well for their respective peoples, victims of authoritarian regimes." Brazilian government owns 64% of Petrobras.

=== "Caviar left" ===
In a text published in the newspaper O Globo in 2012, Constantino used the mayoral election of Rio de Janeiro, disputed mainly between Eduardo Paes (PMDB party, elected) and Marcelo Freixo (PSOL, a left party) as an example to write about what he sees as a "Brazilian caviar left", a pejorative term broadly similar to the English "champagne socialist" and the American "limousine liberal", stating: "Rio de Janeiro is a victim of a real plague: the 'caviar-left', formed by the financial and cultural elite of the country. Their members pose as altruistic, while praising bloody dictators like Fidel Castro. From the comfort of their apartments in Paris, because no one is made by iron." Constantino further claims that "our artists and leftist intellectuals have schizophrenia, because admire socialism but also love three things that only capitalism can give to you: Good caches in hard currency, no censorship, and bourgeois consumerism. Hypocrisy is useful: approaching the power, these intellectuals get privileges. Petrobras, for example, has allocated R$ 652 million for 'cultural sponsorships' between 2008 and 2011." Constantino went on to claim that one of the reasons for the formation of the "caviar left" is "a sentiment of guilt", saying that "culturally, in a country that condemns profit, and sees the economy as a zero-sum game, where Joseph, to get rich, need to take from John, the success ends up being a 'personal offense', as Tom Jobim said."

In 2013, he again used the term, commenting on the murder of a police officer, Colonel Simões Rossei Reynaldo, saying in regards of President Dilma Rousseff condemning the act, "It's the least that is expected of our leaders, usually remaining silent when the victims are police officers, not the 'protesters'." He went on to claim that "the historical position of the PT in particular, and the Left in general, has been to ease into the side of violent groups or even criminals who speak in the name of 'social justice.' It is the case of MST, among others. PT helped create this monster, which today seems somewhat out of control. There are clear signs that leftist parties are behind some of these movements that have brought chaos to our streets.", and that those groups "come with the support of artists and intellectuals of the caviar-left. Some even dress up in black bloc clothes, others recorded videos condemning the police on the streets... and defending the 'political prisoners'. Police, for this class, is 'fascist', while the real fascists are masked and armed 'young idealists' who need to 'dream'. The useful idiots are not my biggest concern. Always existed in a reasonable amount and below the equator. What really takes my sleep is the silent moderate majority. We can never forget the warning given by Burke: 'All that is necessary for the triumph of evil, is that good men do nothing.'"

== Personal life ==
Constantino is a Roman Catholic convert from atheism.

== Awards ==
He won the Libertas Award in 2009, at the XXII Freedom Forum.
