= Zé Pilintra =

Brazilian folklore entity

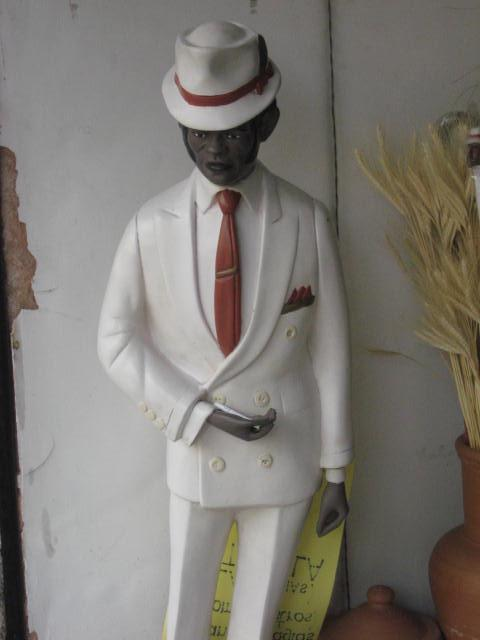
Zé Pilintra statue.

Zé Pilintra is a boss of one phalanx of entities of light (''group of evolved spirits considered entities that return incorporated/irradiated in mediums to help others'') originating from the syncretic belief called Catimbó, which arose in the Northeast of Brazil. Zé Pilintra is also commonly incorporated in Umbanda temples, with his people spread throughout Brazil. In this religion, it can be considered part of the line of work of right or left (each one with its own characteristics).

Zé Pilintra is one of the most important entities in Afro-Brazilian cults, especially among Umbandistas. It is considered the patron spirit of bars, gambling venues and gutters, although not aligned with entities of a negative nature, it can be considered a kind of archetypal transcription of the "rascal" that makes transitions between both worlds.

According to tradition, he was born in the state of Pernambuco in his human form.

== Origins ==
In Umbanda, Zé Pilintra is widely believed to be an Exu.

In Catimbó, Zé Pilintra is seen as a wandering human spirit leading a phalanx of malandros.

== Distribution of followers ==
The followers of Zé Pilintra are concentrated in the urban areas of Rio de Janeiro and São Paulo, but they are also found in the rural regions of northeastern Brazil, among catimbozeiros (followers of Catimbó).

== On media and popular culture ==
Brazilian composer and singer Chico Buarque based the main character of his Ópera do Malandro according to the visual style and manners of Zé Pilintra

Brazilian musician and composer, Itamar Assumpção, wrote a song about Zé Pilintra in 1988, with Wally Salomão as composing partner, named "Zé Pilintra".

Brazilian samba composer and singer, Bezerra da Silva, recorded a song about Zé Pilintra in 1976 on his album O Rei do Côco, named "Segura a Viola (Zé Pilintra)" (Hold the Guitar, Zé Pilintra).
