= Malandragem =

Portuguese term for a lifestyle of lawlessness

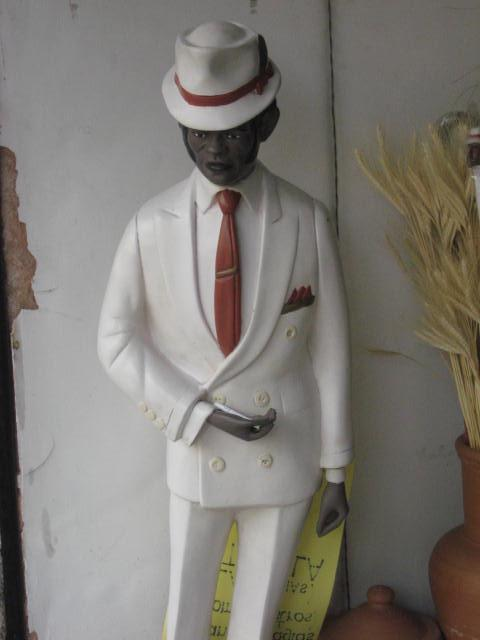
Statue of Zé Pilintra, an entity in Umbanda that traditionally personifies malandros.

Malandragem (Portuguese pronunciation: [malɐ̃ˈdɾaʒẽj], lit. 'roguishness' in Portuguese) is a lifestyle of idleness, fast living and petty crime. It is traditionally celebrated in samba lyrics, especially those of Noel Rosa and Bezerra da Silva. The concept is common in Brazilian literature, Brazilian cinema and Brazilian music.

The exponent of this lifestyle, the malandro (a masculine adjective), or "bad boy" (rogue, hustler, rascal, scoundrel, gangster), has become significant to Brazilian national identity as a folk hero or, rather, an anti-hero. The malandros are a classic carioca archetype. The well-dressed, work-shirking wise guy who sidesteps society’s rules to live as he pleases.

== Definition ==
Malandragem is a strategic approach used to gain an advantage in various situations, often of an illicit nature. It involves savoir faire and subtlety, demanding aptitude, charisma, and cunning to manipulate people or institutions for the best outcome with minimal effort.

Disregarding logic, labor, and honesty, the malandro assumes that such methods are incapable of achieving a favorable outcome. Those who practice malandragem act in the spirit of the Brazilian adage, immortalized by former Brazilian soccer player Gérson de Oliveira Nunes in a cigarette TV commercial (hence the name "Gérson's law"): "I like to gain the advantage in everything."

Malandragem is often seen as a tool for individual justice in the face of oppressive forces. The individualist malandro survives by manipulating people, fooling authorities, and sidestepping laws to ensure their well-being. In this way, the malandro is a typical Brazilian hero, with literary examples including Pedro Malasartes and João Grilo.

Malandragem is employed by individuals of various social positions to gain illicit advantages in gambling, business, and social interactions. A malandro may deceive others, but this doesn't necessarily make them selfish. Their use of malandragem often aims to escape unfair situations, even if it means resorting to illegal means. In fiction, malandragem is a device used to introduce wit, a characteristic of an antihero.

== In capoeira ==
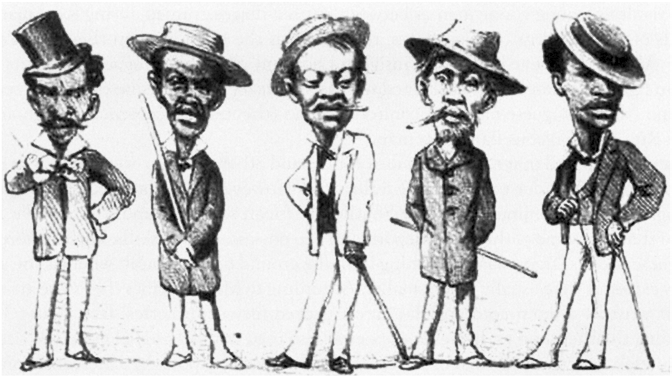
Caricature of capoeira malandros, 1885

In capoeira, malandragem is the ability to quickly understand an opponent's intentions, and during a fight or a game, fool, trick and deceive him. This malandragem is one of the basic tenets in the philosophy of capoeira and is similar to the cunning of the Hunter deity, Oxóssi.

Some of the popular proverbs among capoeiristas embodying the philosophy of malandragem include:

- "Quem não pode com mandinga não carrega patuá" (He who can't handle mandinga doesn't wear a patuá [good-luck charm]). In other words, everyone should be aware of their limitations.
- "Urubu para cantar demora" (A vulture takes a long time to sing), or its alternative version: "Bater papo com otário é jogar conversa fora" (Talking to a fool is a waste of words).
- "Valente não existe" (There's no such thing as a tough guy). It means capoeiristas should not be misled by the appearance of "tough guys" and should acknowledge that everyone experiences fear and insecurity to varying extents. They should see the person beneath the physical strength facade, whether in themselves or others.

== Literature ==
- Capoeira, Nestor (2007). The Little Capoeira Book. Blue Snake Books. ISBN 9781583941980.
- Capoeira, Nestor (2002). Capoeira: Roots of the Dance-Fight-Game. Blue Snake Books. ISBN 978-1-58394-637-4.

== See also ==
- Gérson's law
- Jineterismo
- Jeitinho
