= Gérson =

Brazilian footballer (born 1941)

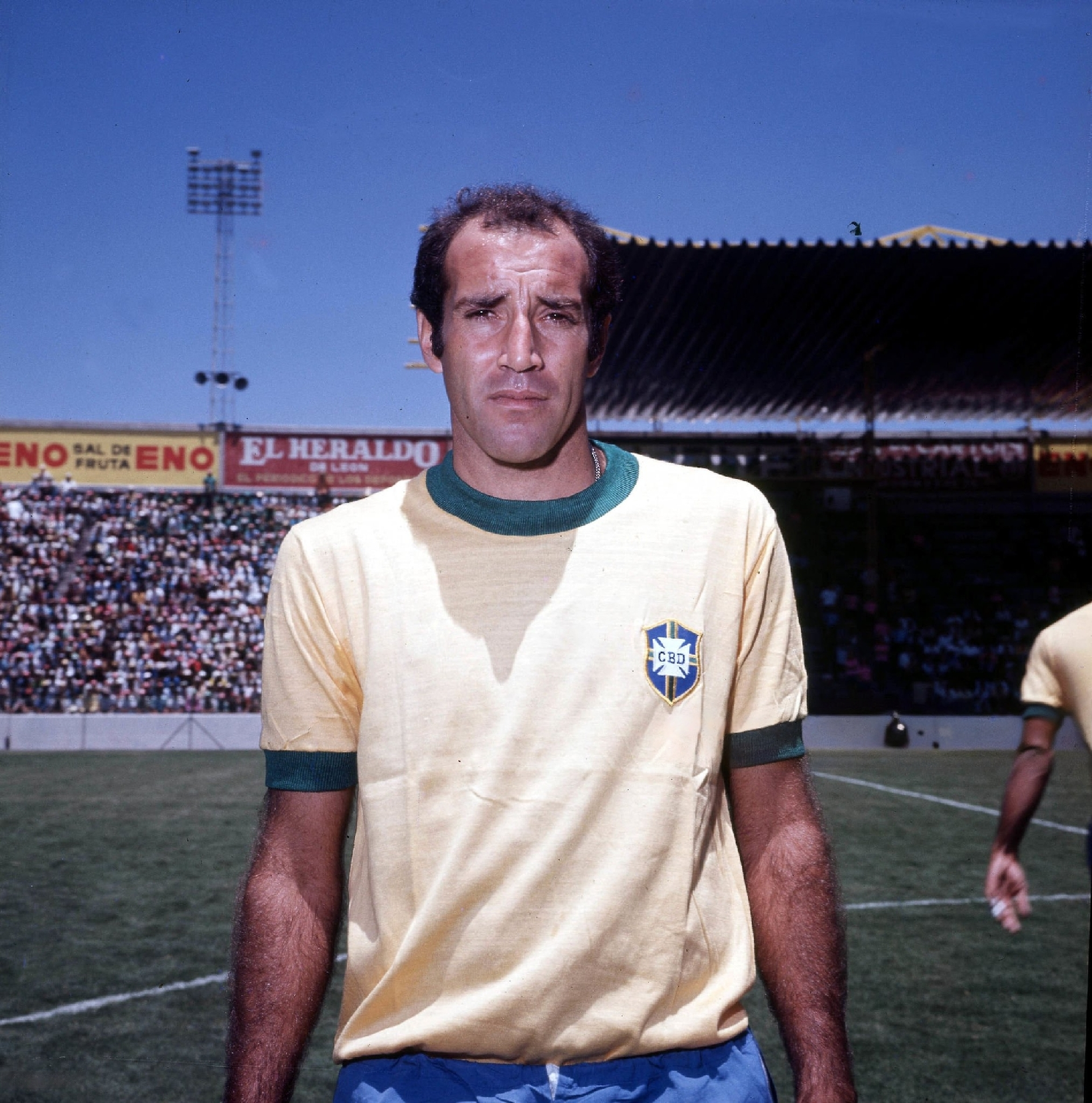
- Gérson with Brazil in 1970

Personal information
- Full name: Gérson de Oliveira Nunes
- Date of birth: 11 January 1941 (age 85)
- Place of birth: Niterói, Brazil
- Height: 1.70 m (5 ft 7 in)
- Position: Midfielder

Youth career
- 1958: Canto do Rio

Senior career*
| Years | Team | Apps | (Gls) |
| 1959–1963 | Flamengo | 58 | (33) |
| 1963–1969 | Botafogo | 99 | (35) |
| 1969–1972 | São Paulo | 33 | (5) |
| 1972–1974 | Fluminense | 21 | (1) |
| Total | | 211 | (74) |

International career
| 1959–1960 | Brazil Olympic | 12 | (9) |
| 1961–1972 | Brazil | 70 | (14) |
Medal record
Men's Football
Representing Brazil
Pan American Games
| Silver medal – second place | 1959 Chicago |
FIFA World Cup
| Winner | 1970 Mexico |
- * Club domestic league appearances and goals

Gérson de Oliveira Nunes (Portuguese pronunciation: [ˈʒɛʁsõ dʒoliˈvejɾɐ ˈnunis]; born 11 January 1941), generally known as Gérson, is a Brazilian former association footballer who played as a midfielder. He won numerous national trophies with the club sides of Flamengo, Botafogo, São Paulo and Fluminense. He is widely known as "the brain" behind the Brazil Football Team that won the 1970 FIFA World Cup in Mexico.

== Career ==
Gérson was born and spent his childhood in the city of Niterói, just to the eastern side of Guanabara Bay from Rio de Janeiro, then the capital of the former Rio de Janeiro State. In school, he was nicknamed papagaio (parrot), a nickname he kept throughout his life and which many of his fellow footballers used when addressing him.

Both his father and uncle were professional footballers in Rio. His father was a close friend of the legendary Zizinho, widely held as the best Brazilian footballer before Pelé, a superstar with Flamengo and a forward in the 1950 national team, along with Vasco da Gama's Ademir Menezes and Flamengo's Jair da Rosa Pinto. So when Gérson announced he intended to become a footballer himself, he found little opposition at home.

As a boy, Gérson was influenced by midfielders Zizinho and Jair, as well as Vasco da Gama's Danilo Alvim. At Flamengo, his playing style was compared with that of midfielder Didi. Gérson was known for his technique, left-footed shooting and passing from midfield, including long passes from deep positions. He was later regarded as a possible successor to Didi.

Within a year of making his professional debut for Flamengo in 1959, he was called to the Brazilian 'amateur' team in the Pan-American Games in Chicago. A year later he was a lynchpin of the side at the Rome Olympics where he scored four goals, but Brazil did not make it beyond the group phase. By 1961, he was the playmaker in Flamengo. He had also been recruited into the full national squad to defend the World Cup in Chile by the new national coach Aymore Moreira. Yet his dreams of combining with the bandy-legged 'Little Bird' Garrincha, along with Pelé and Didi in Chile were dashed when he suffered a serious knee injury. Forced to undergo surgery, he couldn't get himself back into Moreira's squad. It would be one of many injuries to blight his career.

In 1963, he chose not to sign another contract with Flamengo after being assigned the impossible task of man-marking Garrincha in the 1962 Rio de Janeiro Championship final, which Botafogo won 3–0. He packed his bags and moved to Botafogo, which by then had the most celebrated squad in Rio and arguably in Brazil, alongside Pelé's Santos, featuring superstars Garrincha, Didi, Nilton Santos, Zagallo and Quarentinha. In Botafogo he became one of the most celebrated Brazilian players of his generation, winning the Torneio Rio-São Paulo in 1964 and 1965, the Rio de Janeiro Championship in 1967 and 1968 and with the Brazilian Cup in 1968 in two finals against Fortaleza the first national honour in the history of Botafogo.

Later on, he also played for São Paulo and Fluminense, his favourite team.

Gérson is considered one of the best passers in World Cup history. Although he didn't play well in 1966, he was the mastermind behind the whole Brazilian national team in the 1970 tournament. He is regarded as the best passer and midfielder in that edition of that World Cup, in that Brazilian squad, and the second best player in the 4–1 victory against Italy in the final, after Pelé himself. Overall, he played 70 times for Brazil, scoring 14 goals for his country, including one in that 1970 World Cup final.

Outside the soccer pitch, Gérson's name became nationally infamous after he starred in a Vila Rica cigarettes' advertising campaign for television in 1976, which had him read the tagline "I like to take advantage of everything, right? You too take advantage!". The line became instantly associated with the traditional Brazilian disregard for laws and social rules as well as bribery and corruption maneuvers, informally named "jeitinho brasileiro" ("the Brazilian way") or "Lei de Gérson" ("Gérson's Law"), and the expression is largely used to these days. He later publicly regretted having starred in the ad, claiming his association with such acts did not reflect his true personality.

== Style of play ==
Although Gérson played as a holding midfielder, Jonathan Wilson noted in a 2013 article for The Guardian that he was an early example of a more creative interpreter of this role, who focussed more on ball retention and passing rather than solely looking to win back possession. A tactically intelligent, efficient, and technically gifted midfield playmaker, he was considered the "brain" behind the Brazilian squad that won the 1970 World Cup. He was known for his ability to retain possession and dictate the tempo of his team's play in midfield with his precise passing, and was also capable of switching from defence to attack by playing sudden, accurate long balls to meet his teammates' runs; he is regarded as one of the best passers in the history of the sport, and as one of Brazil's greatest ever players. He also possessed an excellent positional sense, and a powerful shot with his left foot, which earned him the nickname Canhotinha de Ouro ("Golden left foot," in Portuguese).

== Controversy ==
Gérson displayed anger towards Pelé's list of the 125 greatest living footballers. He was adamant with the ruling and thought that he and a few of his teammates deserved a spot on the list. He symbolically ripped up a piece of paper, a clear representation of Pelé's list, on a local broadcasting station, saying that "I respect his opinion, but I don't agree. Apart from Zidane, Platini, and Fontaine, I'm behind 11 Frenchmen? It's a joke to hear this."

== Career statistics ==
- Brazil national team (87 matches / 19 goals)
- Flamengo (153 matches / 80 goals)
- Botafogo (248 matches / 96 goals)
- São Paulo (75 matches / 12 goals)
- Fluminense (57 matches / 5 goals)

== Honours ==
Flamengo

- Torneio Rio-São Paulo: 1961
- Rio de Janeiro State Championship: 1963

Botafogo

- Torneio Rio-São Paulo: 1964, 1966
- Taça Brasil: 1968
- Rio de Janeiro State Championship: 1967, 1968

São Paulo

- São Paulo State Championship: 1970, 1971

Fluminense

- Rio de Janeiro State Championship: 1973

Brazil

- FIFA World Cup: 1970

Individual

- FIFA World Cup Silver Ball: 1970
- FIFA World Cup All-Star Team: 1970
- World Soccer World XI: 1971
- World Soccer: The 100 Greatest Footballers of All Time
- Brazilian Football Museum Hall of Fame
