= Gérson's law =

Principle in Brazilian media culture

In Brazilian media culture, Gérson's law (Portuguese: Lei de Gérson) is a principle in which a certain person or company gains advantages indiscriminately, without caring about ethical or moral issues.

Gérson's Law has come to express highly characteristic and unflattering traits of the national media character, which is interpreted as the character of the population, associated with the spread of corruption and disregard for social rules to obtain advantages.

== Origin ==
The expression emerged in the mid-1980s when journalist Mauricio Dias interviewed the professor and psychoanalyst from Pernambuco, Jurandir Freire Costa, for the magazine IstoÉ, on the occasion of his article "Narcissism in Dark Times". It was during this interview that Dias coined the term "Gérson's Law" to refer to the desire that a large portion of Brazilians have to take advantage of everything. Later, in 1992, in the 18th edition of the magazine Teoria e Debate, the term "Gerson's Law" was mentioned again by Maria Rita Kehl in an interview with the same Jurandir Freire da Costa.

When Maurício Dias coined the expression "Gérson's Law", he alluded to a television advertisement from 1976 created by the agency Caio Domingues & Associados, which had been hired by the cigarette manufacturer J. Reynolds, owner of the Vila Rica brand, to promote the product. The video featured midfielder Gérson, a player for the Brazilian national football team, as the protagonist.

The video begins with the statement that Gérson was the "brain behind the world champion team of the 1970 World Cup." The narration is done by the interviewer, who appears in a suit, tie, and microphone in hand. The scene takes place on a sofa in a living room.

The interviewer asks why Gérson chose Vila Rica cigarettes. As he begins his response, Gérson takes out a pack of Vila Rica and offers a cigarette to the interviewer. While the interviewer smokes his Vila Rica cigarette, Gérson explains the reasons that made him prefer that brand.

Why pay more if Vila gives me everything I want in a good cigarette? I like to take advantage of everything, right? Take advantage too, have Vila Rica!

Later, Gérson said he regretted associating his image with the advertisement since any unethical behavior came to be associated with his name in expressions such as the Gérson Syndrome or Gérson's Law.

The director of the Caio Domingues & Associados commercial, José Monserrat Filho, trying to disclaim responsibility, maintains that the public misinterpreted their video: "There was a misinterpretation, people started to understand it as being sly. In the second advertisement, we said: taking advantage is not about stepping over others, it's about getting ahead, but that phrase didn't stick, the popular wisdom uses what suits it."

In the 1980s, Brazilian mass media began reporting on corruption in Brazilian politics, and the population started using the term "Gérson's Law".

== See also ==
- Malandragem
- Jeitinho
