= Patrícia Carlos de Andrade =

Brazilian economist

Academic background
- Education: Pontifical Catholic University of Rio de Janeiro (M.A.) 1987; College of Liberal and Professional Studies (MBA) 2011

Academic work
- Discipline: Economics, Applied Positive Psychology
- School or tradition: Libertarian economics
- Institutions: Instituto Millenium (2005–present)

Patrícia Carlos de Andrade (Portuguese pronunciation: [paˈtɾi.si.ɐ ˈkaʁ.luz d͡ʒi ɐ̃ˈdɾa.d͡ʒi]) is a Brazilian economist, daughter of the journalist Evandro Carlos de Andrade (managing editor of O Globo from 1971 to 1995 and Director of TV Globo's News Center between 1995 and 2001). She was also married to economist Beny Parnes, with whom she had three children. In March 2005, she founded the Institute of National Reality Studies ("Instituto de Estudos da Realidade Nacional" - IERN), which became the Instituto Millenium in April 2006.

== Academic life ==
Carlos de Andrade has an M.A. in economics (1987) from Pontifícia Universidade Católica do Rio de Janeiro (PUC-RJ), when she defended a thesis about The behavior of aggregate investment in Brazil – 1960/1985 ("O comportamento do investimento agregado no Brasil – 1960/1985"). The panel was composed by Dionisio Dias Carneiro, Edmar Lisboa Bacha and Rogério Ladeira Furquim Werneck, with Dionisio Dias Carneiro as advisor. The same year, she enrolled for a doctoral program at the University of Pennsylvania, which does not seem to be completed.

In 2011, she earned a Master of Applied Positive Psychology (MAPP) from the College of Liberal and Professional Studies (University of Pennsylvania's non-traditional education division), being oriented by Martin Seligman. In the same year, she was one of the organizers of the 1st Brazilian Conference of Positive Psychology, held between 20 and 21 October in the city of Rio de Janeiro.

== Professional life ==
Carlos de Andrade reports to have worked to the banks Icatu and JPMorgan, in positions of "economics and political analysis." Apparently, she has ceased to work as an economist, because her registration in the professional association (CORECON-RJ) was canceled on June 29, 2006 under this claim.

=== Instituto Millenium ===
Founded by Carlos de Andrade, the Instituto Millennium is an advocacy think tank for spreading the New Right ideas. In a 2005 article published in O Estado de S. Paulo, she sets out the role of a think tank:

It is a research center that brings together academics, experts and political operators of a high standard to produce and spread political ideas and to formulate public policies, its promotion and implementation through the most advanced techniques of advertising.

To make the venture possible, it will be essential the active participation of the business community (there's no left-wing think tanks, as reminds us Denise Barbosa Gros):

The businessmen are the only group capable of giving the necessary financial support for the existence of a think tank. Through supporting initiatives of the venture, sponsorship, orders for researches and courses, and direct donations, are key to attracting and maintain a team of highly qualified professionals (...)

The Institute avoids linking its image to the old Brazilian right-wing (associated with the repression supported by the military dictatorship), but Carlos de Andrade herself, before the presidential election of 2002 (in which Lula da Silva was elected), signed an online manifesto sponsored by the conservative journalist Olavo de Carvalho, which denounces the "dominant leftist bias in the national mainstream media", the "informal dictatorship implanted in the media to the control of consciences" and the "establishment of the absolute reign of organized lying." All this, it is worth remembering, still under the neoliberal government of President Fernando Henrique Cardoso and just over a year after the death of Evandro Carlos de Andrade, who led with an iron hand the journalism of Globo Organizations for almost three decades (1971–2001).

In 2009, in an article written for the Instituto Millenium, in which is claimed that "liberals are cornered" after "more than six years of Lulism," Carlos de Andrade took up that vision:

According to her, the term "liberal" is mistranslated in Brazil as "rightist" or "supportive of military dictatorships." In the war for public opinion, the so-called left always got the better, she says.

== Publications ==
- — (2000). Guia de profissões e mercado de trabalho. Rio de Janeiro: Oriente-se. ISBN 85-87149-03-2.
