= Roberto DaMatta =

Brazilian anthropologist

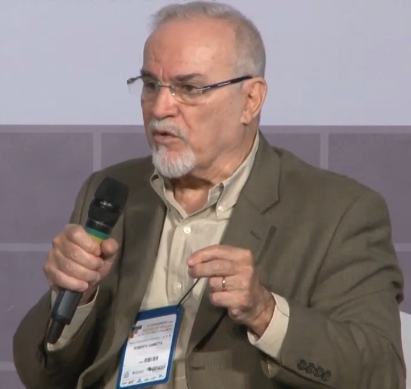
- Born: July 29, 1936 (age 90); Niterói, Brazil
- Education: Harvard University
- Scientific career
- Fields: Anthropology
- Workplaces: University of Notre Dame

Roberto DaMatta (born July 29, 1936) is a Brazilian anthropologist. He is an emeritus professor of anthropology at the University of Notre Dame. DaMatta graduated in history at the Fluminense Federal University and received his PhD from Harvard University.

He taught at his alma mater and at the Pontifical Catholic University of Rio de Janeiro, as well as at the National Museum. In 2022, he was awarded the Prêmio Machado de Assis for his body of work.

DaMatta is the author of many books, including Carnivals, Rogues and Heroes: An Interpretation of the Brazilian Dilemma.

== Selected works ==
- Carnavais, malandros e heróis: Para uma sociologia do dilema brasileiro, 1979.
  - Translated into English as Carnivals, Rogues, and Heroes: An Interpretation of the Brazilian Dilemma, University of Notre Dame Press, 1991.
- A Divided World: Apinaye Social Structure, Harvard University Press, 1982.

== See also ==
- Jeitinho
- Sérgio Buarque de Hollanda
- Darcy Ribeiro
