= Jeitinho =

Brazilian cultural convention

Jeitinho (Brazilian Portuguese: [ʒejˈtʃĩɲu], lit. 'little way' in Portuguese) is a method of accomplishing a goal by circumventing or bending the rules or transgressing social conventions. The concept is a deeply ingrained part of Brazilian culture.

== Overview ==
The word "jeitinho" is the diminutive form of jeito, meaning 'way', which comes from the Latin 'jactum'. The usage of 'jeitinho' is derived from the expression dar um jeito, meaning "to find a way". It implies the use of resources at hand, as well as personal connections, and creativity. Como é que ele conseguiu os bilhetes? How did he get the tickets? Ele deu um jeito. He found a way.

Most times Jeitinho is harmless, used to find creative solutions to nonsensical problems and/or excessive bureaucracy, as gatecrashing a party to obtain free food and beverage, or making extraneous handshake deals that don't follow exactly what's in the written contracts. Although it's sometimes seen as dishonest or cunning, in reality it comes from the necessity associated with a lack of resources and official help. Most Brazilians have to be creative and invent new, simpler ways to do things they need, as living. An associated concept is "gambiarra", an improvised solution to technical emergencies with whatever means are at hand, or to jury rig, e.g. attaching less-than-ideal materials to something that broke and make it functional again. The difference between "Jeitinho" and "gambiarra" is that the former is a deal between individuals, while the latter is about fixing objects and systems.

One way to understand jeitinho is as a recurso de esperteza, which means a resource used by espertos—savvy, cunning, or sly individuals who use common sense and prior knowledge, as well as naturally gifted intelligence in their thought processes. It implies that a person is "street-smart", but not necessarily "book-smart." It typically also connotes opportunism, pragmatism, and using one's networks, with little regard for the law, the state or for persons outside of one's own circle or family.

== Scholarly discussion ==
Brazilian scholar and historian Sérgio Buarque de Holanda connects the concept of jeitinho to Brazil's mixed heritage and Iberian ancestry in his book "Roots of Brazil" (Raízes do Brasil). In this work, jeitinho is tied to the idea that a typical Brazilian is a friendly, cordial man, prone to making initial decisions based on his emotions rather than his reason, and that this feature can be found everywhere in the country, from the highest offices of government to the most common situations of everyday life. Jeitinho is also observed in Rio de Janeiro's carnival industry by the scholar Roberto DaMatta in his book "Carnavais, Malandros e Heróis" (Carnival, Rogues and Heroes. Notre Dame Press). Da Matta sees jeitinho in the creative culture of carnival.

== Similarity to other terms ==
The terms "malandro" and "malandragem", which can be roughly translated as "rogue" and "roguishness", are very similar to the "jeitinho", but these terms imply a greater degree of breaking the rules, as opposed to bending the rules.

Elsewhere in Latin America, similar concepts include viveza criolla in Argentina and Uruguay, juega vivo in Panama and malicia indígena in Colombia.

Similar slang terms are used in Europe. One example is the Hungarian term 'megoldani okosba', which translates literally to 'to solve it the smart way'. In Polish, the verb 'kombinować', has a similar meaning to the English term.

== See also ==
- Opportunism
- Gérson's law
- Corruption in Brazil
- Jugaad
