= Pontifical Catholic University of Rio de Janeiro =

Jesuit university in Rio de Janeiro, Brazil

- Pontifícia Universidade Católica do Rio de Janeiro
- Coat of arms of the university
- Motto: Alis Grave Nil (Latin)
- Motto in English: With wings, nothing is heavy
- Type: Private Roman Catholic Research Non-profit Coeducational Higher Education Institution
- Established: 30 October 1940; 85 years ago
- Religious affiliation: Roman Catholic (Jesuit)
- Chancellor: Orani João Cardinal Tempesta, OCist.
- President: Fr. Anderson Antonio Pedroso, S.J.
- Vice rector: Fr. André Luís de Araújo, S.J.
- Faculty: 800
- Students: 21,240 (In year 2022)
- Undergraduates: 8,700 (In year 2022)
- Postgraduates: 2,566
- Location: Rua Marquês de São Vicente, 225, Gávea - Rio de Janeiro, RJ, Brazil; 22°58′45.48″S 43°13′56.82″W
- Campus: Urban
- Colors: Yellow and Blue
- Website: www.puc-rio.br

The Pontifical Catholic University of Rio de Janeiro (Portuguese: Pontifícia Universidade Católica do Rio de Janeiro; PUC-Rio) is a Jesuit, Catholic, pontifical university in Rio de Janeiro, Brazil. It is the joint responsibility of the Catholic Archdiocese of São Sebastião do Rio de Janeiro and the Society of Jesus.

== History ==
The university was created in 1941 by the Society of Jesus to emphasize humanistic values in the pursuit of knowledge. PUC-Rio has 12,000 undergraduate students, 2,500 graduate students, and 4,000 extension students. In 2009 it ranked first among 2,252 higher education institutions in Brazil on ENADE, a benchmark exercise run by the Brazilian Ministry of Education.

In 2023, it was evaluated by THE Times Higher Education World University Rankings in several areas. In the area of Computer Science, PUC-Rio reached first place overall in the country, also obtaining the Brazilian leadership in the Partnership with Industry indicator. In the area of physical sciences, the university positioned itself as the national leader in the Partnership with Industry and Internationalization indicators, occupying the third position overall in the country. In the area of social sciences, PUC-Rio achieved the leadership in Internationalization among Brazilian universities.

In 2024, PUC-Rio was considered the best private institution in the country, and the 5th best overall (among public and private) by the QS World University Rankings.

PUC-Rio has highly accredited faculties in law, engineering, computer science, psychology, economics, business, and international relations. It fosters cultural diversity in its student body. It has participated in exchange programs with Harvard, Notre Dame, UC Berkeley, UCLA, Brown University as well as European universities, with hundreds of students participating each year.

== Location ==
PUC-Rio is located in Gávea in the south of Rio, at the edge of Tijuca National Forest. The campus was once a coffee farm. A creek crossed by three bridges runs through the campus. Several city bus lines pass the university, which is near the suburban neighborhoods of Leblon, Ipanema, Jardim Botânico, and Lagoa. The Botanical Gardens and Leblon beach are within walking distance to the university.

== Campus ==
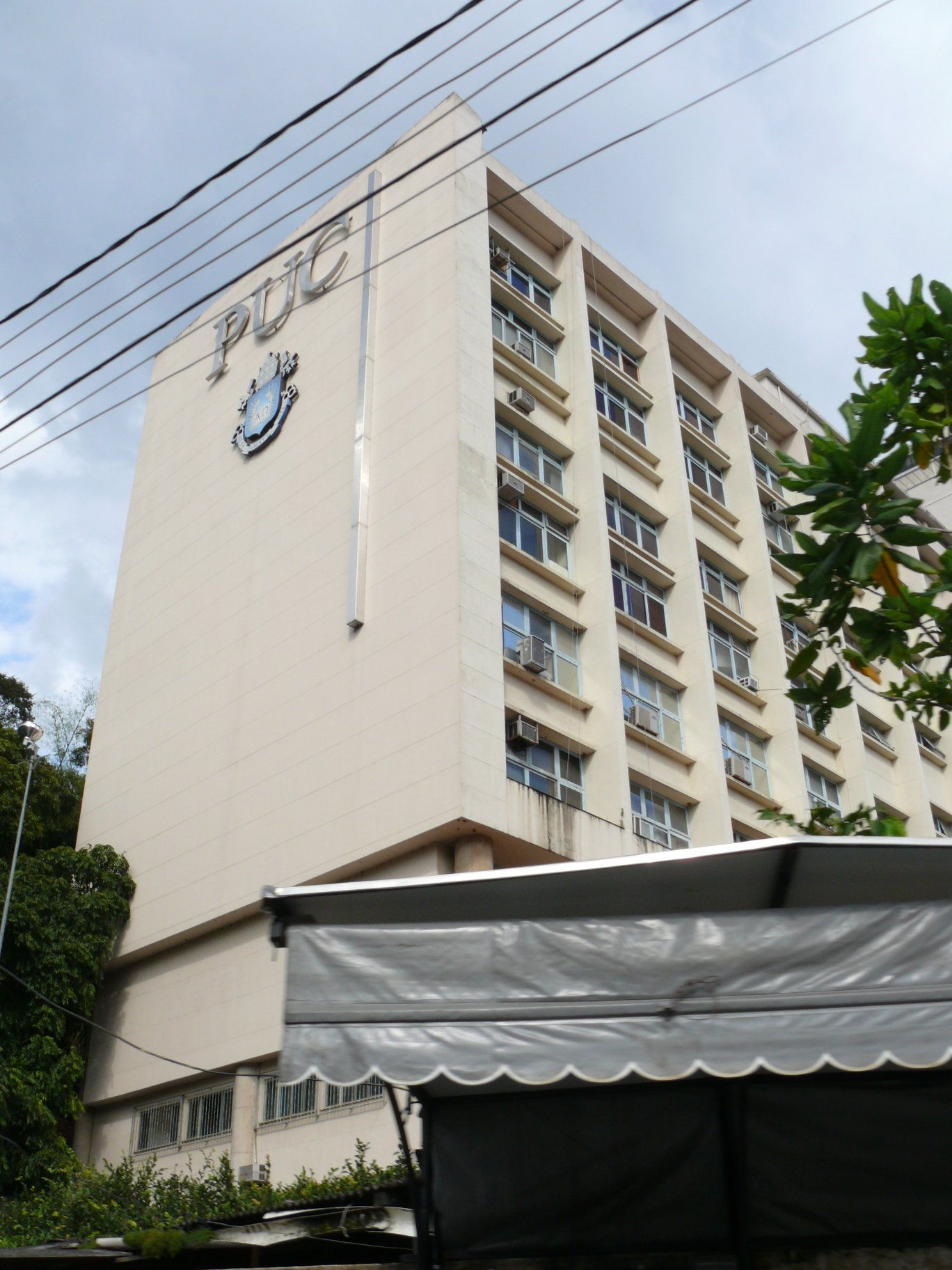
Main building

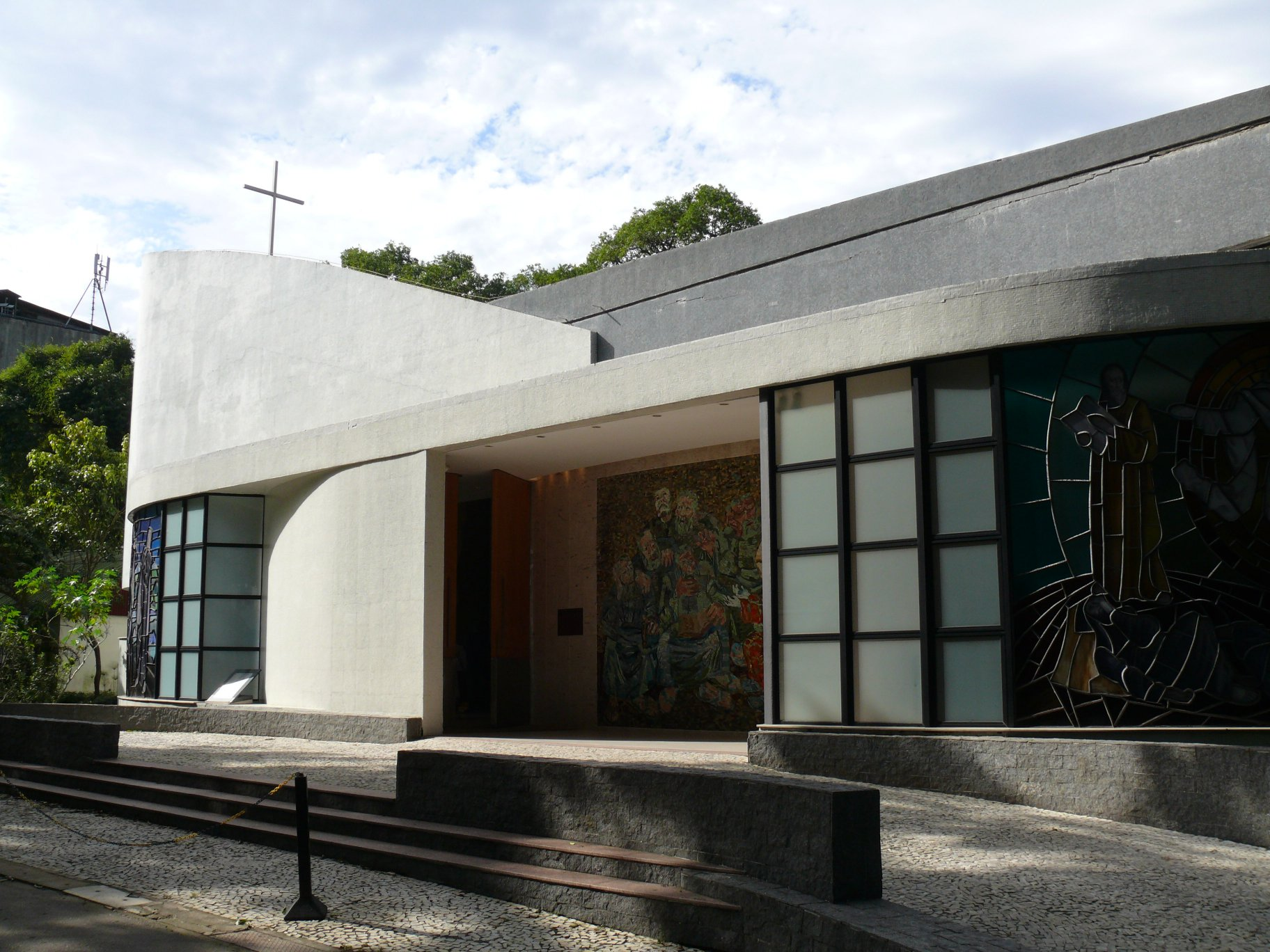
The church of the Sacred-Heart of the PUC

The campus was built with donations from institutions and foundations in the early 1940s. In the early '60s the USA through its American Schools and Hospitals Abroad program donated the building now named after President John Kennedy; the grant was received during his administration. Besides the Central Library there are three specialized libraries. Solar Grandjean de Montigny (built in 1823 by the architect of the same name), PUC-Rio's Cultural Center, has year-round visual arts exhibitions. Pilotis (Kennedy building's ground floor) hosts cultural events such as political debates, shows, and fairs. The "Festa Junina" each June features folkloric food, costumes, and dance from old Brazil.

There is also the "Vila dos Diretórios" (Academic Directories Village), a small cobblestone alley that used to house employees from a local factory, but which since the opening of the campus, has become a place of social interaction.

Each house in the alley belongs to an academic directory, which must maintain and look after the property, and can use it for whatever it wishes. The engineering directory house, for example, is often used for studying and to heat up meals in a public microwave there located.

Parties, themed or not, are often held in the village, always on Thursdays.

On campus are three restaurants, five coffee-shops, a bookstore, an office supply store, copy centers, branches of Banco Itaú and Banco Santander Brasil, newsstand, and ATMs. The neighborhood of the university contains more shops, banks, the Rio Planetarium, specialized bookstores, restaurants, and a mall. Most students use Rio de Janeiro's municipal bus system to get to the campus. A metro station was being built on the site of the former university parking lot as part of the construction work for the Rio 2016 Olympic Games. However, due to accusations of overpricing, the work was halted and, to this day, has not been completed.

PUC-Rio can be divided into four university centers, each center is made of dozens of units and supplementary organs responsible for education, research and extension in their respective areas of knowledge.

- Center for Social Sciences (CCS): It consists of nine departments administration, social science, social communication, law, economy, geography and environment, history, social service and international relations.
- Science and Technology Center (CTC): The CTC offers ten engineering programs (Petroleum, Control and Automation, Production, Computing, Chemical Engineering, Materials and Nanotechnology, Electrical, Mechanical, and Environmental Engineering), as well as two computer science programs (Computer Science and Artificial Intelligence), and undergraduate degrees in Mathematics, Physics, and Chemistry. The Lua programming language was created at the Tecgraf Institute, which is part of the CTC.
- Center of Theology and Human Sciences (CTCH): It consists of seven departments, eight undergraduate courses, eight graduate programs, In addition to the departments of architecture and urbanism, arts and design, education, philosophy, letters, psychology and theology. The Institute of Advanced Studies in Humanities (IEAHu) and the Carlo Maria Martini Chair are part of the deanery.
- Center for Biological and Health Sciences (CCBS): it encompasses several departments, including the Department of Biology, Department of Medicine (House of Medicine), and the Department of Nutrition. While the university does not yet offer an undergraduate Medicine program, it provides postgraduate courses through the School of Medical Postgraduate Studies within the House of Medicine, located near the main campus. Plans for an undergraduate Medicine course are in development but have no set release date.

== Admission ==
For undergraduate admission to PUC-Rio two exams are used: ENEM and its own vestibular test. The results of these tests are used in determining the distribution of academic scholarships to students. PUC-RIO accepted 12% of applicants for the class of 2022 making it a very selective institution.

== Research ==
As mentioned before, the Lua programming language was developed by Roberto Ierusalimschy, Luiz Henrique de Figueiredo, and Waldemar Celes, members of the Computer Graphics Technology Group at PUC-Rio, beginning in 1993.

The Tecgraf Institute for Technical and Scientific Software Development, founded in 1987, was created as a laboratory of the PUC-Rio Department of Information Technology, the result of a partnership between PUC-Rio and Petrobras, with the goal of developing computer graphics projects.

Over the course of its development, the Institute has consolidated its work by expanding its operations to all areas of Petrobras, including seismic, reservoir, automation, environment and logistics. In 2013, Tecgraf became an institute of PUC-Rio.

The institute currently has over 400 collaborators, including students and professors. Many of the technologies and methodologies implemented in the systems developed are the result of theses and dissertations and various academic works from the institution itself.

Tecgraf/PUC-Rio currently develops around 40 computer systems and several core technologies such as frameworks, libraries and APIs. The Institute's main areas of expertise are: Digital Interactivity; Modeling and Simulation; and Data Analytics.

Tecgraf develops most of its projects in cooperation with several departments at PUC-Rio, especially the Department of Computer Science, encouraging the academic production of its professors and collaborators. The Institute receives master's and doctoral students who are assigned to positions that are close to their research projects. Currently, in addition to Petrobras, it has as partners the Brazilian Navy and the Federal University of Maranhão (UFMA).

== Notable alumni ==
- Alex Behring, co-founder 3G Capital
- Arminio Fraga
- Arnaldo Jabor
- Beny Parnes
- Bernardo Rezende
- Bianca Comparato
- Carlos Alberto Menezes Direito
- Carlos Diegues
- Cecília Malan
- Cristiane Murray
- Clarisse de Souza
- Eduardo Paes
- Fernanda Abreu
- Gregorio Duvivier
- Gustavo Franco
- Jaques Wagner
- João Clemente Baena Soares
- João Moreira Salles
- Jorge Sá Earp
- Leonardo de Moura, creator of Z3 Theorem Prover and Lean (proof assistant).
- Marcelo Adnet
- Marcelo Camelo
- Marcelo Gleiser
- Marielle Franco
- Nara Leão
- Patrícia Carlos de Andrade
- Pedro Bial
- Pedro Malan
- Renata Vasconcellos
- Roberto Ierusalimschy, co-creator Lua (programming language)
- Rodrigo Amarante
- Rodrigo Constantino
- Rodrigo Santoro
- Suely Druck
- Walter Salles
- Rodrigo R. Soares, Columbia University economist

== Faculty ==
The following are a partial list of professors from the Pontifical Catholic University of Rio de Janeiro.

- Affonso Romano de Sant'Anna
- Alceu Amoroso Lima
- Alessandro Molon
- Ana Maria Machado
- Carlos Alberto Menezes Direito
- Everardo Rocha
- Nancy D. Erbe (in 2015)
- Flávio Carneiro
- Gustavo Franco
- Ivo Pitanguy
- João Moreira Salles
- Marcílio Marques Moreira
- Pedro Bloch
- Pedro Malan
- Roberto DaMatta
- Roberto Ierusalimschy

== See also ==
- Brazil University Rankings
- List of Jesuit sites
- Universities and Higher Education in Brazil
