= Instituto Millenium =

Brazilian think tank

- Founder: Patrícia Carlos de Andrade
- Established: 2005
- Focus: New Right, Economics
- Key people: Gustavo Franco; Rodrigo Constantino
- Budget: Revenue (2012): $524,391; Expenses (2012): $494,330
- Location: Rio de Janeiro, Rio de Janeiro, Brazil
- Website: www.institutomillenium.org.br

The Instituto Millenium (Portuguese pronunciation: [ĩs.t͡ʃiˈtu.tu mi.leˈniw̃]; lit. 'Millennium Institute'), also known by the acronym Imil ([iˈmiw]; or IMIL), is a Brazilian "advocacy think tank" based in Rio de Janeiro. It was created in 2005 by the economist Patrícia Carlos de Andrade to disseminate a world view based on economic liberalism (or "modern right"). According to Observatório da Imprensa, it has the support of large corporations and media groups, with the aim of influencing the Brazilian society through the diffusion of ideas of its representatives, experts and columnists.

== History ==
The Instituto Millenium (Imil) was founded in 2005 as "Instituto de Estudos da Realidade Nacional" (Institute for the Study of National Reality). In 2009, Imil became a Civil Society Organization of Public Interest (OSCIP), the equivalent of a U.S. non-profit organization 501(c)(3).

== Activities ==
Imil discloses its world view through "seminars, conferences and meetings around the country, contact with the press and publishing daily analysis on the portal."

== Ideological linkage ==
Officially, Imil declares itself as "unrelated to political parties." and promotes values of "individual freedom, property rights, market economy, representative democracy, rule of law and institutional limits to government action". Imil, however, do not assume itself as "liberal", since according to its founder, Patricia Carlos de Andrade, this word was incorrectly translated in Brazil as "rightist" or "supporter of military dictatorships."

Imil aligns itself with similar institutions, Brazilian or international, among them, are the Instituto Liberal, Instituto Liberdade, Instituto Ling, Instituto de Estudos Empresariais, the Chilean network Latinoamerica Libre and the global Atlas Economic Research Foundation.

Thinkers and writers identified with the political right are also among the founders, experts and regular contributors to Imil. Among them, Rodrigo Constantino.

== Funding and structure ==
By becoming an OSCIP, Imil became eligible to "receive income tax deductible donations from legal persons up to 2%." Among his supporters, partners and sponsors are media companies like Grupo Abril (Veja and Exame magazines) OESP Group (O Estado de S. Paulo) and RBS Group (affiliated to Rede Globo in southern Brazil), the second largest private university in Brazil (Estácio de Sá), the American Chamber of Commerce (AmCham Rio), industrial conglomerates (Gerdau Group and Suzano), service companies (Localiza Rent A Car), insurance companies (Porto Seguro), and financial corporations such as Bank of America Merrill Lynch. The institute also accepts donations from individuals.

== Related personalities ==
Among other notable sponsors and partners, the Imil features the following personalities of the Brazilian business, cultural, and journalistic scenes:

- Arminio Fraga (former Governor of the Central Bank of Brazil)
- Gustavo Franco (former Governor of the Central Bank of Brazil)
- Ives Gandra (jurist and tax lawyer)
- João Roberto Marinho (vice president of Globo Organizations)
- Jorge Gerdau Johannpeter (chairman of the Gerdau Group)
- Judith Brito (director-superintendent of Folha Group)
- Nelson Sirotsky (chairman of RBS Group)
- Pedro Bial (host of the Big Brother Brazil)
- Ricardo Diniz (vice president of Bank of America Merrill Lynch Brazil)

The late Roberto Civita, Grupo Abril's chairman, was also one of the counselors of the Instituto Millenium.

== See also ==
- Cato Institute
- Economic liberalism
- Ludwig von Mises Institute
