= Conservatism in Brazil =

Conservatism in Brazil (Portuguese: Conservadorismo) designates the movement originated from certain cultural traditions of Brazil, as well as the relationship with Portuguese-Iberian cultural roots and diverse influences. The movement received influences from Roman heritage and part of Greek philosophy in its foundation in Christianity.

More traditional conservative historical views and features include belief in political federalism, Catholicism and monarchism.

== History ==
=== Before independence from Portugal (1500–1822) ===
See: Colonial Brazil

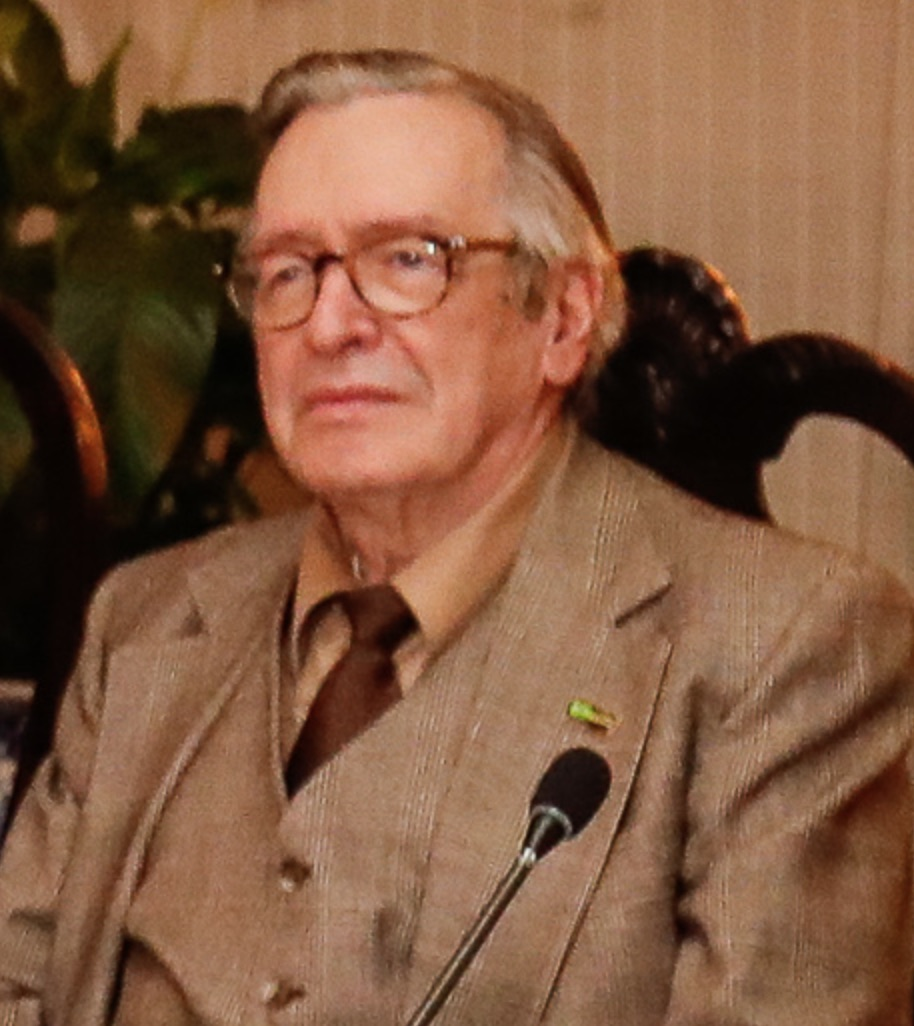
Writer and journalist Olavo de Carvalho in 2019.

Portuguese colonization made a strong impression on the traditional formation of Brazilian society. The doctrine of the Catholic Church with the public policies of the Portuguese State, as well as architecture, literature and other spheres of Lusitanian culture marked the history of Brazil, manifesting itself vigorously even after its independence.

The Conservative Party of the imperial period was the first political organization of a conservative character in independent Brazil, arising from a tradition that rejected republicanism and liberalism, providing the territorial integrity of the new country, as well as the continuity of slavery. He was given supremacy in the parliamentary relay system with the Liberal Party that defined the political landscape of the Second Reign.

=== Brazilian Empire (1822–1889) ===
See: Empire of Brazil

The Conservative Party emerged in mid-1836 from the anti-liberal and centralist faction of Brazilian politics whose origin dates back to Brazil's independence process, wielding the flag of "order" in opposition to what they considered the "disorder" promoted by liberals. Its members were gradually nicknamed "saquaremas", nickname arising from the municipality of Saquarema, where they used to meet. Although Brazil was already an independent nation, its Portuguese-Catholic origins were still manifested in the sociopolitical sphere, especially through the conservative agenda. However, the saquaremas did not disconsider foreign ideas, which they adapted when imported into Brazilian politics.

Under the regency of the Marquis of Olinda, the Army was vigorously and violently ineffective to ensure the integrity of the Brazilian State against the recurrent regional rebellions, after the Regency Period. The conservatives occupied the Council of Ministers for the next 23 years, led by figures such as the Marquis of Paraná and the then Marquis of Caxias, during which time Brazil defused the Praieira Revolt and contained the expansionism of Argentine warlord Juan Manuel de Rosas during the Platine War.

After the liberal administration of the Septum 1861–1868, the conservatives returned to government for a decade, which began in the final moments of the Paraguayan War. The Religious Question occurred in the year 1870 and was solved by the accession of the then Duke of Caxias to the presidency of the Council of Ministers five years later; the first Brazilian census was conducted in 1872 and revealed a growing population of 10 million Brazilians.

The Baron de Cotegipe held the presidency of the Council of Ministers in August 1885, after another liberal septon, determined to halt the impending process of abolition of slavery that had accelerated in the 1870s. His cabinet is dismissed in 1888 by the then regent Isabel at the time of the Military Question, and is then replaced by another cabinet, headed by João Alfredo Correia de Oliveira (affiliated to the Conservative Party) who was in favor of immediate abolition, which is held in the same year.

During the management headed by the Conservative Party countless positive social changes were effected, with the process of abolitionism being the most legacy. The Viscount of Rio Branco, in 1871, promulgates the Free Womb Law; in 1885, the Sexagenarians' Law, drafted by Rui Barbosa (a liberal); finally, the Law Aurea, by Prime Minister João Alfredo, with the regent Isabel. Like Anglo-Saxon conservatives, the Saquaremas kept their perspective in line with Edmund Burke's, advocating that all institutional reform should be studied in the face of concrete reality and not imposed abruptly. However, the conservative - and often reactionary - character of his reforms ended up wearing down the monarchical regime.

=== First Republic (1889–1930) ===
See: First Brazilian Republic

The establishment of the Republic on 15 November 1889 ended the imperial project. Dom Pedro II and his family were foregone. The ideological foundations of the new regime were diverse and all hostile, at different intensities, to the monarchism that conceived the old regime. There was among the vast portion of the Army the belief that successive civilian offices attacked their corporation, depriving their members of rights who as they had been free citizens of the Empire; another small faction of students from the Red Beach Military School had germinated revolutionary feelings fueled by various scientific ideologies imported from Europe, but especially positivism.

In the civil frameworks of the movement, the group of liberal Republicans from São Paulo was distinguished, in which there were rich coffee growers and professionals of the Law School of Largo São Francisco. His ideology was complemented by sympathy for the federalist model of the United States. At the time, the division that occurred between the population, between liberal Republicans and conservative monarchists, inspired Machado de Assis to publish his work Esau and Jacob.

=== Second Republic (1930–1937) ===
After the Revolution of 1930, which culminated in a coup d'état, ending the Republic of coffee with milk, and the way it was organized. On November 3, 1930, Getúlio Vargas assumed the power of the provisional regime, beginning a period of constant state interventionism in the economy and contradictory social policies of a nationalist and populist character.

With the revolution, several political leaders of the Republican Party of São Paulo, including President-elect Júlio Prestes, who had graduated from the government of São Paulo and the president of the republic Washington Luís were exiled. The vice president of São Paulo, acting as president of the state, Dr. Heitor Penteado, was deposed on October 24, 1930, arrested and exiled. All parties were extinguished, only coming back into existence in the 1933 elections. The provisional government, with all its difficulties, inaugurated, from the point of view of the revolutionaries of 1930, the country to the contemporary world.

Though typical to this era, the Patrianovist monarchist movement never gained much weight.

=== Third Republic or Estado Novo (1937–1945) ===
On November 10, 1937, through a coup d'état, Vargas instituted the Estado Novo in a radio network statement, in which he launched a Manifesto to the nation, in which he said that the regime aimed to "readjust the political body to the economic needs of the country." This new regime, inspired by the Portuguese Estado Novo, was characterized by the centralization of power, nationalism, anticommunism and its authoritarianism. His positions were legitimized by the 1937 Constitution (known as The Polish Constitution), inspired by the Polish semi-fascist model, which was extremely authoritarian and granted the government virtually unlimited powers. This governance had contradictory characteristics, with some innovative aspects, such as the impulse to industrialization, and authoritarian, such as the repression of coercion movements supported by military groups.

At the time, strong censorship prevented democratic preaching, with little prevalence of freedom of expression, liberal and socialist intellectuals were imprisoned or banned. Vargas kept Congress closed, censored the press, and threatened democratic freedom. On October 24, 1943, the first criticisms of the Estado Novo were emerging, with the launch of the Mineiros' Manifesto.

=== Fourth Republic (1945–1964) ===
See: Fourth Brazilian Republic

After the deposition of Getúlio Vargas, on October 29, 1945, which ended the Vargas Era, reinstituting pluripartisanship and free elections. A populist period is beginning, characterized by nationalist and interventionist tendencies in the economic area. On April 7, 1945, the conservative-oriented National Democratic Union party was founded, defending economic liberalism and social conservatism.

On January 31, 1946, he took office as president Eurico Gaspar Dutra, after winning the elections, on December 2, 1945, by the Social Democratic Party, in coalition with the Brazilian Labor Party. Of a developmental nature, Dutra gathered suggestions from various ministries and gave priority to four areas: Health, Food, Transportation and Energy, whose Portuguese initials form the acronym SALTE. The resources for the implementation of the SALTE Plan would come from the Internal Revenue Service and external loans. However, the resistance of the conservative coalition and the orthodoxy of the economic team eventually derailed the plan, which practically did not leave the role.

In April 1946, there was a prohibition of gambling in Brazil, established by law decree 9 215 of April 30, 1946, signed by the president on the grounds that gambling is degrading to humans. In 1947, by the judgment of the Superior Electoral Court, the registration of the Brazilian Communist Party was cancelled, making it illegal, based on a constitutional text that prohibited the existence of parties that were opposed to the liberal democratic regime. In 1948, the mandates of PCB representatives were revoked, and there was a breakdown of relations with the Soviet Union. Many point out, the strong influence that Dutra's wife, Carmela Teles Leite Dutra, would have exerted, motivated by her strong devotion to the Catholic Church.

=== Fifth Republic (1964–1985) ===
After the mobilization of federal troops, which began on March 31, 1964, President João Goulart left for exile in Uruguay on April 1. A movement had broken out five years after the Cuban alignment with the Soviet Union, and there was a communist threat in Brazil. The movement also lacked the president's great popularity among the population, especially the most deprived. Cuba had financed and trained Brazilian guerrillas since 1961, during the Jânio Quadros administration.

However, this is mainly due to the fact that the attempts to be conservatively oriented and aligned with the United States had already occurred in Brazil since the last government of Getúlio Vargas (1951-1954), 1961 being the year in which, after the resignation of Jânio Quadros, Vice President João Goulart was prevented from taking office by the military, contrary to the current constitution, in a clear attempt to break with the democratic rule of law on the part of the right.

The military regime reached its peak in the 1970s, with the "economic miracle". In the 1980s, like other Latin American military regimes, the Brazilian fell into decline when the government could no longer stimulate the economy, control chronic inflation and the increasing levels of income and poverty concentration stemming from its economic project, which gave impetus to the pro-democracy movement.

Finally, the government passed an Amnesty Law for political crimes committed by and against the regime, restrictions on civil liberties were relaxed and then indirect presidential elections were held in 1985 with civil and military candidates.

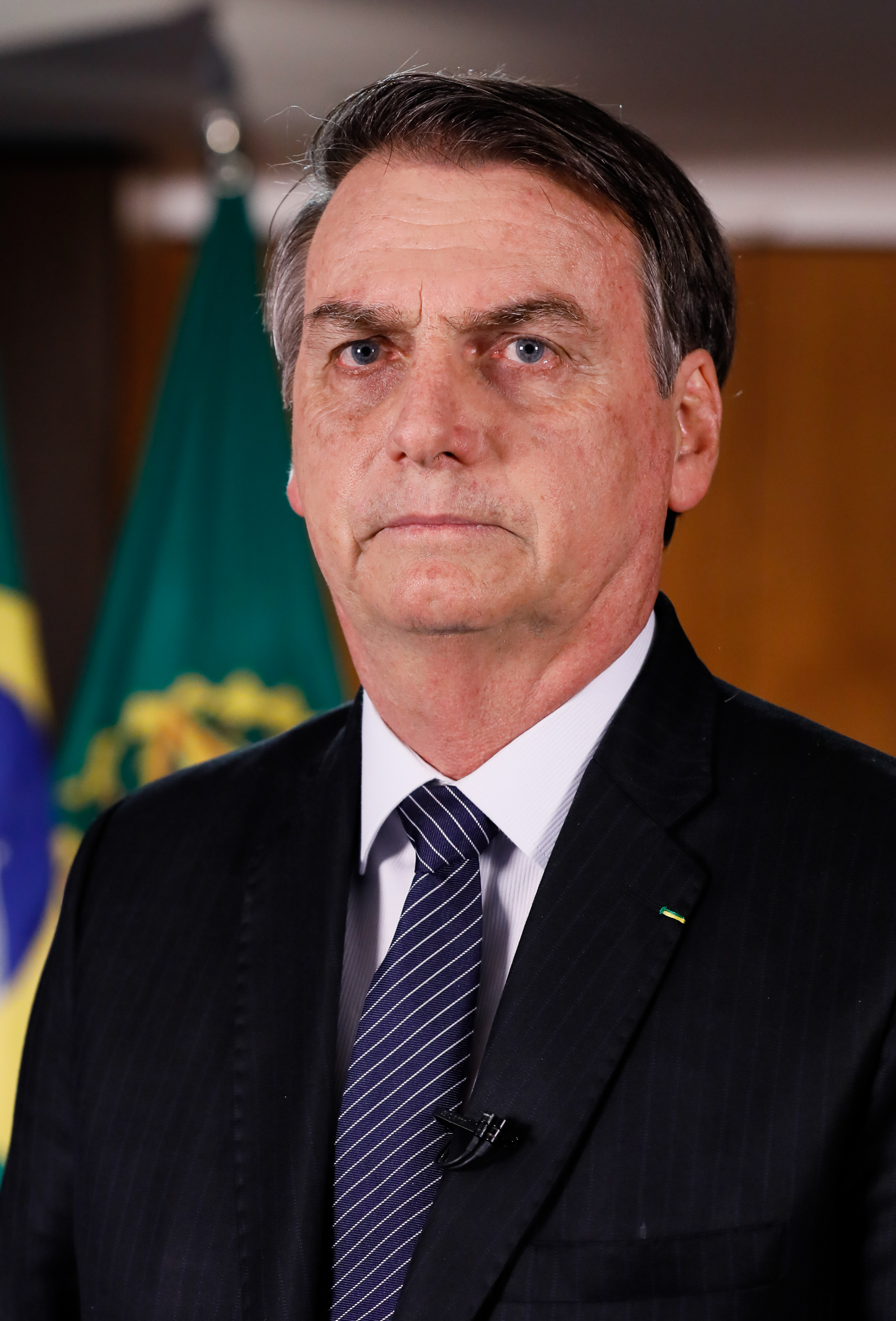
Jair Bolsonaro in 2019

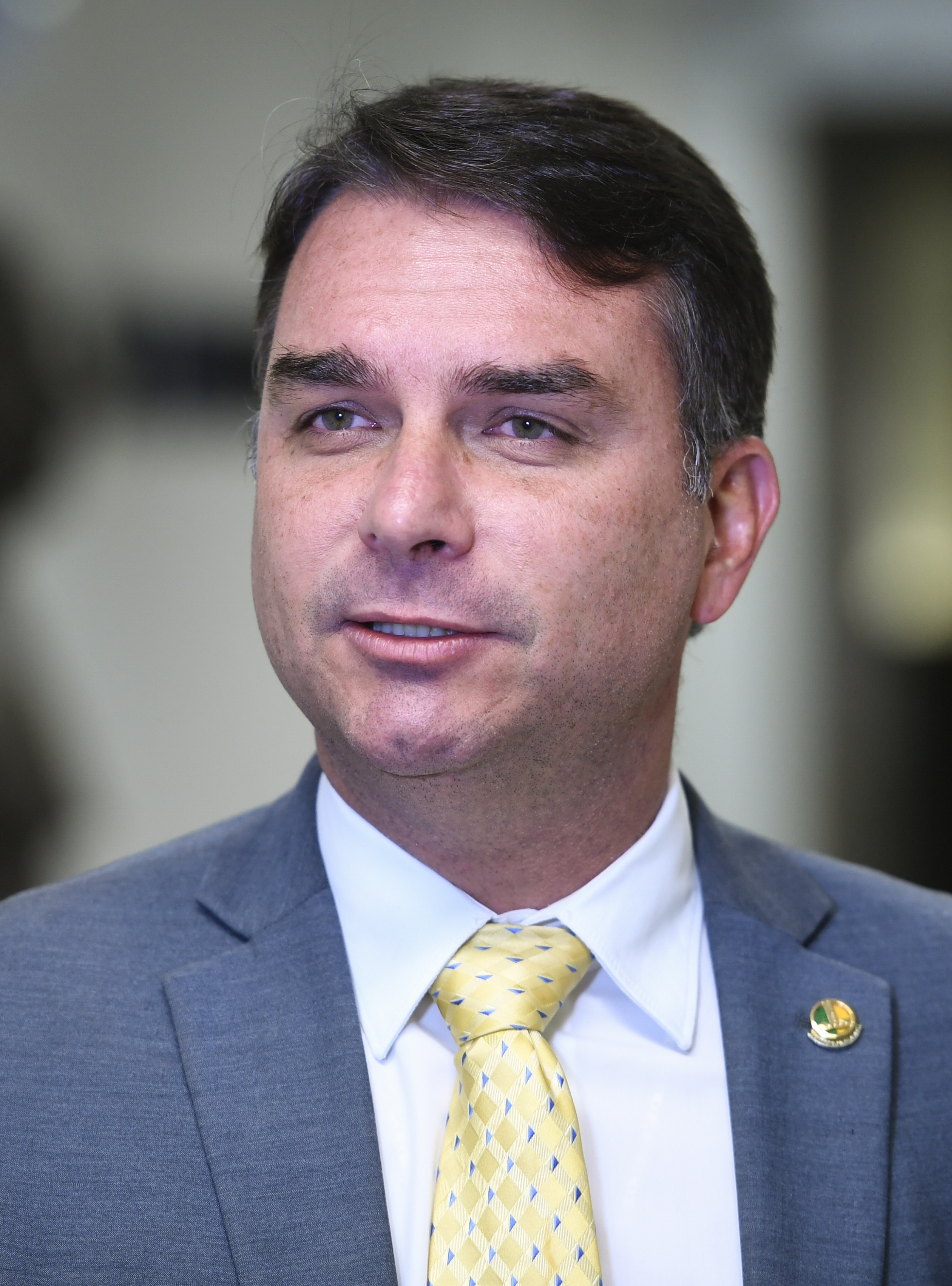
Flávio Bolsonaro in 2022

=== Sixth Republic (1985––) ===
See: Conservative wave in the 2010s

Positions on contemporary issues in the Brazilian conservative movement include opposition to abortion and same-sex marriage, although there is no consensus. There are opinion polls indicating that most Brazilian society has positions linked to the political right, although not all consider themselves effectively conservative.

== Conservative parties in Brazil ==
=== Active ===
- Brazil Union
- Brazilian Labour Renewal Party
- Brazilian Woman's Party
- Christian Democracy
- Democratic Renewal Party
- Liberal Party
- Progressistas
- Republicans

== Personalities ==
Brazilian conservatism includes names like:

- Gilberto Freyre and José Osvaldo de Meira Penna in sociology;
- Paulo Francis, Augusto Nunes, Luís Ernesto Lacombe and Percival Puggina in journalism;
- Bruno Tolentino in poetry;
- Sobral Pinto, Miguel Reale and Ives Gandra Martins in law;
- Plinio Corrêa de Oliveira, Gustavo Corção, father Paulo Ricardo and father Léo in the Catholic Church;
- Silas Malafaia among protestant leaders;
- Mario Henrique Simonsen, Eugênio Gudin and Roberto Campos in the economy;
- José Bonifácio, Joaquim Nabuco, Arlindo Veiga dos Santos, Enéas Carneiro, Jair Bolsonaro and Carlos Lacerda in politics;
- Mário Ferreira dos Santos, Luiz Felipe Pondé and Olavo de Carvalho in philosophy;
- Herberto Sales, Josué Montello, Nelson Rodrigues and Yuri Vieira in literature;
- Álvaro Lins, José Monir Nasser and Rodrigo Gurgel in literary critic;
- Manuel de Oliveira Lima and João Camilo de Oliveira Torres in historiography.
- The politicians from the BBB Bench (bife - steak, that is, agribusiness; Bíblia - Bible, Christianism; bala - bullet, right to have guns), which includes representatives from the Evangelical Caucus and the Bullet Bench.
- Journalists from the online journals Gazeta do Povo (since 2015), Revista Oeste and Brasil Sem Medo.
- Members of Centro Dom Bosco, a Catholic lay organization.

== See also ==
- Socialism in Brazil
