= Bullet Bench =

Parliamentary front in Brazilian politics

In Brazilian politics, the bullet bench is a phrase used to refer to the parliamentary front composed of politicians who support gun rights, the easing of laws related to weapons and against disarmamentist policies. It is a prominent feature of Conservatism in Brazil.

At the federal level, the bench moved to change the Disarmament Statute by proposing 41 projects, including that of parliamentarian Rogério Mendonça, who proposed the approval of new legislation that would increase the penalties for crimes committed with firearms and would revoke that Statute.

However, it is not only in the National Congress that the group is present. In the Municipality of São Paulo, for example, the councilors Álvaro Camilo, ex-commander general of the PM, Paulo Telhada, ex-commander of the Rondas Ostensivas Tobias de Aguiar (ROTA), and Conte Lopes, retired captain, took over in 2013 who also served on Rota and was a state deputy. In the Chamber, the bench presses to create a Security Commission, dismembering the Human Rights Commission, which also deals with the issue.

Senator Major Olímpio represents the State of São Paulo in the Senate and is a former state deputy for two terms and a former federal deputy for one term. Olímpio leads the movement to reduce the age of criminal responsibility, by increasing the sentence for crimes committed by law enforcement officers and crimes committed against police officers, and by ending the temporary departure of convicted prisoners.

== Representatives in the National Congress ==
=== Senate ===
- Major Olímpio (PSL/SP)
- Flávio Bolsonaro (PSL/RJ)

=== Chamber of Deputies ===
- Eduardo Bolsonaro (PL/SP)
- Captain Augusto (PL/SP)
- Katia Sastre (PL/SP)
- General Peternelli (PSL/SP)
- Major Fabiana (PSL/RJ)
- Hélio Negão (PSL/RJ)
- Sargento Gurgel (PSL/RJ)
- Major Vitor Hugo (PSL/GO)
- Delegado Waldir (PSL/PR)
- General Girão (PSL/RN)
- Éder Mauro (PSD/PA)
- Guilherme Derrite (PP/SP)

== See also ==
- Conservatism in Brazil
- Evangelical Caucus (Brazil)
