= Democrata =

Democrata may refer to:

- Democrata Futebol Clube, a Brazilian football (soccer) club from Sete Lagoas
- Esporte Clube Democrata, a Brazilian football (soccer) club from Governador Valadares
- Democrata Party, Philippines; see 9th Philippine Legislature
- Democrata (Brazil), political party
