= Abashed right =

Political phenomenon in Brazil

Abashed right (Portuguese: direita envergonhada) is a term coined by Timothy J. Power in 2000 in the book The Political Right in Postauthoritarian Brazil: Elites, Institutions, and Democratization to describe the Brazilian right after the country's re-democratization.

== History ==
After the end of the military dictatorship in Brazil (1964–1985), many former members of the National Renewal Alliance (ARENA) and the Democratic Social Party (PDS), especially politicians associated with José Sarney, created new parties or migrated to existing ones, including opposition parties such as the Liberal Front Party (PFL) and the Brazilian Democratic Movement (PMDB). These politicians adopted a more moderate discourse and identified themselves as belonging to the political center, reflecting the country's democratic and anti-authoritarian consensus, including among the elite.

In 1987, the National Constituent Assembly of Brazil consisted of 5% far-left deputies, 52% center-left, 37% center, and 6% right-wing, while no one identified as far-right. Between 1990 and 2009, 88% of Brazilian legislators placed themselves on the left, whereas only 13.5% identified with the right. According to this interpretation, post-dictatorship Brazil appeared to be a country in which the political right had virtually disappeared.

According to Power, this phenomenon resulted from Brazil's conservative democratic transition, which neither punished military officials responsible for crimes committed during the dictatorship nor substantially displaced the country's traditional elites from power, instead giving them a democratic veneer. Another contributing factor was the dissolution of the Soviet Union, which made the distinction between left and right less pronounced.

In 1989, Enéas Carneiro founded the Party of the Reconstruction of the National Order (PRONA) and ran for President of Brazil. Until its dissolution in 2006, the party was considered the country's main far-right party, despite defining itself as centrist.

Although the phenomenon was initially expected to be short-lived, it persisted for more than a decade. It weakened, however, with the rise of the BBB Bench during the governments of the Workers' Party (PT). Politicians such as Marco Feliciano, Celso Russomanno, and Jair Bolsonaro began openly identifying themselves as conservatives.

Political scientist Leonardo Avritzer argues that the era of the "abashed right" ended in 2013 with the emergence of the Free Brazil Movement (MBL) and other groups associated with Brazil's New Right.

== Characteristics ==
- Adoption of party names associated with left-wing or progressive movements.
- Self-identification as "centrist" or "moderate" on the political spectrum.
- Promotion of policies considered right-wing.
- Opposition to laws and constitutional amendments that institutionalize the role of political parties.

== Examples ==
=== Parties ===
- Democratic Social Party (PDS)
- Liberal Front Party (PFL)
- Party of the Reconstruction of the National Order (PRONA)

=== People ===
- Enéas Carneiro

== See also ==
- Centrão
- BBB Bench
- Clientelism
