= José Monir Nasser =

Brazilian economist

José Monir Meirelles Nasser (March 28, 1957 – March 16, 2013) was a Brazilian writer, economist, literary critic, and educator. He is better known for promoting liberal arts education in Brazil.

A severe critic of his country's educational system, which he deemed ideological and ''beyond repair'', he insisted on the importance of Western canonical literature and philosophy in cultivating an ''authentic education'', and gave lectures on authors ranging from Classical antiquity to Modernity. His effort earned him praise from the conservative journalists Paulo Briguet and Olavo de Carvalho.

== Biography ==
Born into a middle-class family in Curitiba, he took painting classes as a child under Guido Viaro (pt), and continued practicing the arts into adulthood. He was introduced to the study of the liberal arts as a highschooler, at a time when he worked irregularly as a critic of cinema and theatre. Once graduated, he enrolled in a philosophy course, but eventually abandoned it to pursue a degree in economy, which qualified him to work as a consultant and editor. Over the years, he began occupying culture-related positions, dedicating himself to teaching, literary criticism, and research on comparative religion. Between 2008 and 2011, he presided over the Alliance Française unit in Curitiba.

== Career ==
=== Teaching ===
The lectures he held across many cities attracted large audiences, which included entrepreneurs, highschool and college students, teachers, self-employed professionals and journalists. Among the authors he covered were Aristotle, Plato, St. Augustine, Boethius, Dante, Shakespeare, Dostoyevsky, Kafka and Chesterton.

=== Economy ===
Nasser was an exponent of the Austrian school of economics in Brazil. In his book A Economia do Mais, a compilation of transcribed lectures, he addresses themes such as entrepreneurship and economic development.

=== Essay ===
In the preface he wrote to the Brazilian edition of Miriam Joseph's The Trivium, he made criticisms of Comenius's pedagogy, identifying in it the roots of some of the problems faced by modern education, such as the massification of schooling and the prioritization of rote knowledge transmission over the formation of the student's intelligence.

== Death ==
Nasser died on March 16, 2013, in Curitiba. He suffered a stroke while preparing for a lecture. He is buried in the Green Water cemetery.

== Works ==
=== Books ===
- A Economia do Mais, 2003.

=== Articles ===
- O Brasil que deu certo: a saga da soja brasileira, 2005.

=== Prefaces ===
- O Trivium: as artes liberais da lógica, gramática e retórica, Miriam Joseph, 2015.
- Como ler livros, Mortimer Adler, 2010.

=== Transcribed classes (CC BY-SA) ===
- A Morte de Ivan Ilitch – O Senhor dos Anéis
- O Mercador de Veneza – Moby Dick
- O Inspetor Geral – Admirável Mundo Novo
- Gênesis – O Livro de Jó
- Os Lusíadas - Fédon
