= BBB Bench =

Right-wing groups in Brazil

In Brazilian politics, the BBB Bench is a collective term used to informally describe three powerful political factions (bancadas, literally "benches") in the National Congress associated with the conservative right:

- Bullet Bench (bancada da bala), legislators supportive of protecting and expanding gun rights;
- Rural Bench (bancada ruralista), often referred to as the bancada do boi (Ox Bench), legislators aligned with agribusiness interests.
- Evangelical Bench (bancada evangélica, often referred to as the bancada da bíblia), aligned with the country's evangelical movement.

The term “BBB” was used for the first time by federal deputy Erika Kokay at a meeting of the Workers' Party (PT) bench in the Chamber of Deputies in early 2015, eliciting laughter from colleagues. The expression soon became popular as a derogatory term used by leftists against their conservative opponents, who they deemed a threat to human and minority rights.

The BBB Bench played a crucial role in the impeachment of Dilma Rousseff. Even prior to Dilma's impeachment, the BBB Bench had already begun pressuring centre-right Vice President Michel Temer to support their proposals. In the 2018 presidential election, federal deputy Jair Bolsonaro, a member of the BBB Bench, was elected President of Brazil.

== Rural Bench ==
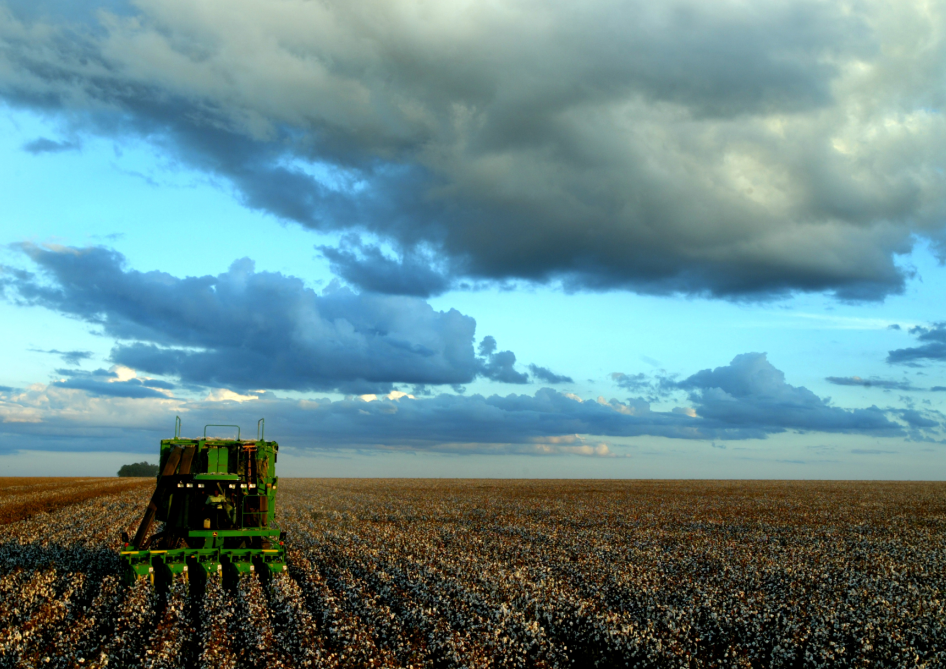
Cotton being harvested in Brazil. Agricultural policy, especially with regards to arable land, maintains a key political issue in Brazil.

The Rural Bench or Ruralist Bench (bancada ruralista), often pejoratively referred to as the Ox Bench (bancada do boi), is a powerful faction within the National Congress allied with the interests of commercial agribusiness. The faction is noted for its association with the Rural Democratic Association (UDR), a conservative agribusiness coalition opposed to land reform efforts backed by socialist parties like the Workers' Party (PT) that aim to expropriate farmland.

In addition to opposing land reform efforts, members of the Rural Bench are noted for supporting policies aimed at expanding the amount of arable farmland in Brazil to the detriment of environmental conservation efforts. Members of the Rural Bench have come into conflict with indigenous activists due to their support for policies that aim to expand commercial activity in protected indigenous territories. Additionally, the Rural Bench has been noted for supporting the easing of laws aimed at banning modern slavery in Brazil by limiting its definition.

Most members of the Rural Bench are considered to be aligned with the broader conservative movement. However, some politicians often associated with the centre-left such as Kátia Abreu, who served as Senator from Tocantins and as Minister of Agriculture under left-wing President Dilma Rousseff, are considered to be associated with the Rural Bench.

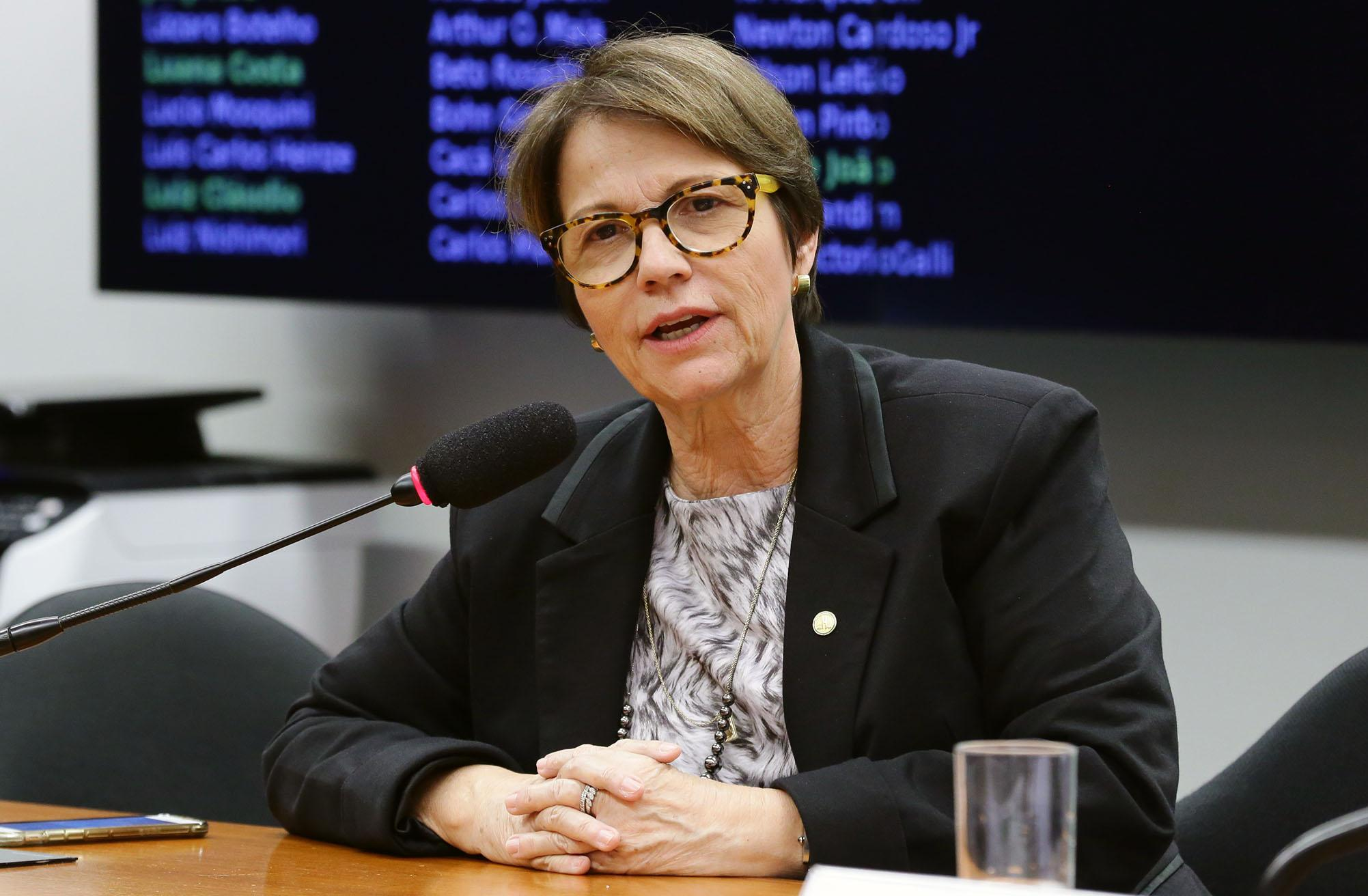
Tereza Cristina, who had been a member of the Rural Bench during her time as a federal deputy, served as Minister of Agriculture under Bolsonaro.

During the conservative presidency of Jair Bolsonaro, the Rural Bench has generally been supportive of the administration's policies, which have generally aligned with the interests of agribusiness. Since taking office, Tereza Cristina, a member of the conservative Democrats party who had been a member of the Rural Bench during her time as a federal deputy, has served as Minister of Agriculture, Livestock and Supply under Bolsonaro. Cristina has been pejoratively labelled "The Poison Muse" for her support for ending some regulations on pesticides in Brazil. Nevertheless, the faction has sometimes broken with the administration, especially with regard to its handling of soybean export policy.

== Bible Bench ==
The Evangelical Parliamentary Front or the Evangelical Caucus (known in Portuguese as Frente Parlamentar Evangélica and Bancada Evangélica respectively) is a loosely organized group of Evangelical lawmakers in the Brazilian government and legislature.

If considered a political party, the Evangelical Caucus would be the third largest in the Brazilian government, surpassed only by the Brazilian Democratic Movement and the Workers' Party. It is a prominent feature of Conservatism in Brazil. (Full article...)

== Bullet Bench ==
In Brazilian politics, the bullet bench is a phrase used to refer to the parliamentary front composed of politicians who support gun rights, the easing of laws related to weapons and against disarmamentist policies. It is a prominent feature of Conservatism in Brazil.

At the federal level, the bench moved to change the Disarmament Statute by proposing 41 projects, including that of parliamentarian Rogério Mendonça, who proposed the approval of new legislation that would increase the penalties for crimes committed with firearms and would revoke that Statute.

However, it is not only in the National Congress that the group is present. In the Municipality of São Paulo, for example, the councilors Álvaro Camilo, ex-commander general of the PM, Paulo Telhada, ex-commander of the Rondas Ostensivas Tobias de Aguiar (ROTA), and Conte Lopes, retired captain, took over in 2013 who also served on Rota and was a state deputy. In the Chamber, the bench presses to create a Security Commission, dismembering the Human Rights Commission, which also deals with the issue.

Senator Major Olímpio represents the State of São Paulo in the Senate and is a former state deputy for two terms and a former federal deputy for one term. Olímpio leads the movement to reduce the age of criminal responsibility, by increasing the sentence for crimes committed by law enforcement officers and crimes committed against police officers, and by ending the temporary departure of convicted prisoners. (Full article...)
