= Suêd Haidar =

Brazilian businesswoman and politician

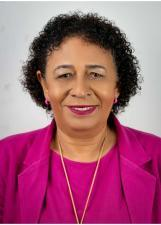

National president of Democrata
- Incumbent
- Assumed office 2015

Personal details
- Born: Suêd Haidar Nogueira; 30 November 1958 (age 67) São Luís Gonzaga do Maranhão, Maranhão, Brazil
- Party: Democrata
- Occupation: Businesswoman, Politician

Suêd Haidar Nogueira (born 30 November 1958) is a Brazilian businesswoman and politician. She is the founder and national president of the Brazilian Women's Party (PMB), a political party that was later renamed Democrata. In 2025, the Superior Electoral Court approved the party's change of name from PMB to Democrata, while retaining its electoral number 35.

== Early life and education ==
Suêd Haidar was born in São Luís Gonzaga do Maranhão, Maranhão, on 30 November 1958. She grew up in a poor family. According to biographical accounts published about her, during her childhood she worked in activities including breaking coconuts, collecting crabs, catching shrimp, and working at a quarry.

In an account later reproduced in a publication about the history of the PMB, Haidar said that she worked at a quarry with one of her brothers and was paid less than he was despite, according to her account, breaking the same amount of stones.

In 1977, Haidar moved to Rio de Janeiro. According to a biography published by the PMB, she arrived in the city eight months pregnant to visit her mother, who worked as a domestic servant, and subsequently remained in the state. Her first job in Rio de Janeiro was as a cleaner. She later worked as a street vendor and became involved in community activities in the city's North Zone.

In Costa Barros, a neighborhood in Rio de Janeiro's North Zone, she founded Santa Clara Day Care Center, which provided services to children in the area. According to an account published by the PMB, the initiative was created after Haidar observed the difficulties faced by women in the neighborhood who lacked a place to leave their children while working.

In 2022, Agência Senado reported that Haidar had completed secondary education and had lived in Rio de Janeiro for 45 years. The publication also identified her as the founder of Santa Clara Day Care Center and national president of the PMB.

== Political career ==
Haidar participated in the organization of the Democratic Labour Party (PDT) during the process of establishing the party led by Leonel Brizola in the late 1970s. She later joined the Communist Party of Brazil (PCdoB).

In 2010, she was launched as a pre-candidate for the Federal Senate by the PCdoB, although the candidacy was not formally registered. According to statements attributed to Haidar, the experience contributed to her decision to organize a new political party.

=== Brazilian Women's Party ===
In 2008, Haidar began organizing the Brazilian Women's Party (PMB). According to a statement she gave to the Federal Senate, the creation of the party was motivated by the aim of increasing women's participation in party politics.

The process of establishing the party continued for several years. On 29 September 2015, the plenary of the Superior Electoral Court unanimously approved the registration of the PMB's statutes and national governing body. The party became the 35th political organization to receive registration from the TSE at the time.

Haidar remained at the head of the party's national leadership. In 2015, she described the PMB as a center-left party and said that its objective was to increase women's participation in politics. Despite its name, she said that the party was not feminist but "female", and stated that men could also join the party.

At the time, the composition of the party attracted attention because of the presence of male politicians. In November 2015, seven federal deputies had joined the party, all of them men. In 2018, the party fielded 226 men and 163 women as candidates for legislative offices, according to a survey published by UOL.

On social issues, Haidar stated that she opposed the legalization of abortion and rejected identifying the PMB with the feminist movement. In a 2015 interview, she also described the party as center-left.

=== Electoral candidacies ===
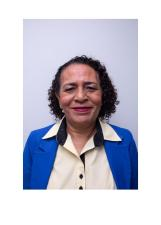
Suêd Haidar in 2020.

==== Federal deputy in 2018 ====
In the 2018 Brazilian general election, Haidar ran for the Chamber of Deputies representing the state of Rio de Janeiro for the PMB. She received 5,279 votes and was not elected.

==== Mayor of Rio de Janeiro in 2020 ====
In 2020, Haidar ran for mayor of Rio de Janeiro for the PMB. Her candidacy was officially announced in September of that year.

She received 3,833 votes, representing 0.15% of valid votes, and was not elected.

==== Senate candidate in 2022 ====
In 2022, Haidar ran for the Federal Senate representing Rio de Janeiro for the PMB, using electoral number 355. Agência Senado listed her candidacy among the 13 candidates for the Senate in the state in that election.

Haidar received 11,933 votes, representing 0.15% of the vote, and finished ninth in the election.

==== City councillor in Rio de Janeiro in 2024 ====
In 2024, Haidar ran for a seat on the Municipal Chamber of Rio de Janeiro for the PMB. Her candidacy was approved by the Electoral Court.

She received 2,576 votes, representing 0.10% of the vote, and was not elected.

== Controversies ==
=== Operation Solon ===
During the 2020 Brazilian municipal elections, Haidar and her running mate for deputy mayor, Jéssica Rabello Guimarães, were the targets of search and seizure warrants carried out by the Federal Police as part of Operation Solon. The operation investigated allegations that money originating from a militia had been laundered to finance election campaigns in Rio de Janeiro.

Jéssica Rabello Guimarães is the daughter of Natalino Guimarães, who had been convicted for participation in the militia known as the Justice League. According to SBT News, the searches took place at the campaign headquarters of the two candidates. The candidates said they were available to the authorities to clarify the allegations.

=== Campaign funding ===
During the 2020 mayoral campaign in Rio de Janeiro, reports based on electoral financial disclosures indicated that Haidar received approximately R$320,000 in public funds from the PMB, representing about one-quarter of the party's national campaign resources distributed at the time.

In 2023, a survey published by Folha de S.Paulo reported that during the 2022 campaign, when Haidar ran for the Senate, she also received approximately 30% of the Electoral Fund resources distributed by the PMB, while receiving 0.15% of the valid votes.

=== PMB financial accounts ===
In 2020, the Superior Electoral Court rejected the accounts of the PMB's National Directorate for the 2015 financial year. The court identified irregularities totaling R$135,600, equivalent to 46.62% of the resources received by the party from the Party Fund during that year.

Among the irregularities identified was the failure to apply the minimum percentage of Party Fund resources required for programs promoting and disseminating women's political participation. The TSE ordered the repayment of funds to the public treasury and suspended the transfer of five installments of Party Fund resources, to be paid in 12 installments.

Haidar appears in the financial-accounting proceedings as one of the people responsible for documentation submitted by the party's national directorate.

=== Internal party disputes ===
As national president of the PMB, Haidar was also involved in judicial disputes concerning the removal of state and municipal party organizations.

In 2024, the president of the PMB's municipal provisional committee in Fortaleza filed a writ of mandamus against an act by Haidar that had deactivated the committee shortly before the municipal elections. In 2026, the TSE upheld a decision finding the act invalid because the requirements of adversarial proceedings and the right to a full defense had not been properly observed.

Also in 2024, a judicial dispute arose between the PMB's national leadership and its state organization in Goiás. The case recorded an allegation that the state provisional committee had been removed by an act attributed to the party's national president.

During the same period, a dispute involving the national leadership and PMB party organizations in Paraná also reached the TSE. The case concerned acts dissolving or deactivating municipal party organizations attributed to the national leadership, with Haidar named as the authority challenged in the proceedings.

== Political positions and alliances ==
In 2024, Haidar represented the PMB at the announcement of the party's support for the candidacy of Guilherme Boulos (PSOL) for mayor of São Paulo. The alliance took place despite the PMB also containing members and groups associated with conservative political positions.

On the occasion, Haidar again stated that the PMB was not a feminist party and disputed the association of the party with former president Jair Bolsonaro.

== Change from PMB to Democrata ==
The party founded by Haidar retained electoral number 35 after changing its name. On 2 December 2025, the Superior Electoral Court partially approved the statutory amendment requested by the Brazilian Women's Party, including the change of its name to Democrata.

The TSE's registry currently identifies the party as Democrata, number 35, and lists Suêd Haidar Nogueira as its national president. The Electoral Court certificate records the current national executive committee as serving from 6 May 2025 to 5 May 2029.

== Electoral history ==
Year	Election	Party	Office	Votes	Result
2018	General	PMB	Federal deputy	5279	Not elected
2020	Municipal in Rio de Janeiro	PMB	Mayor	3833	Not elected
2022	General	PMB	Senator	11933	Not elected
2024	Municipal in Rio de Janeiro	PMB	City councillor	2576	Not elected
