= 2024 Florianópolis mayoral election =

- October 6, 2024
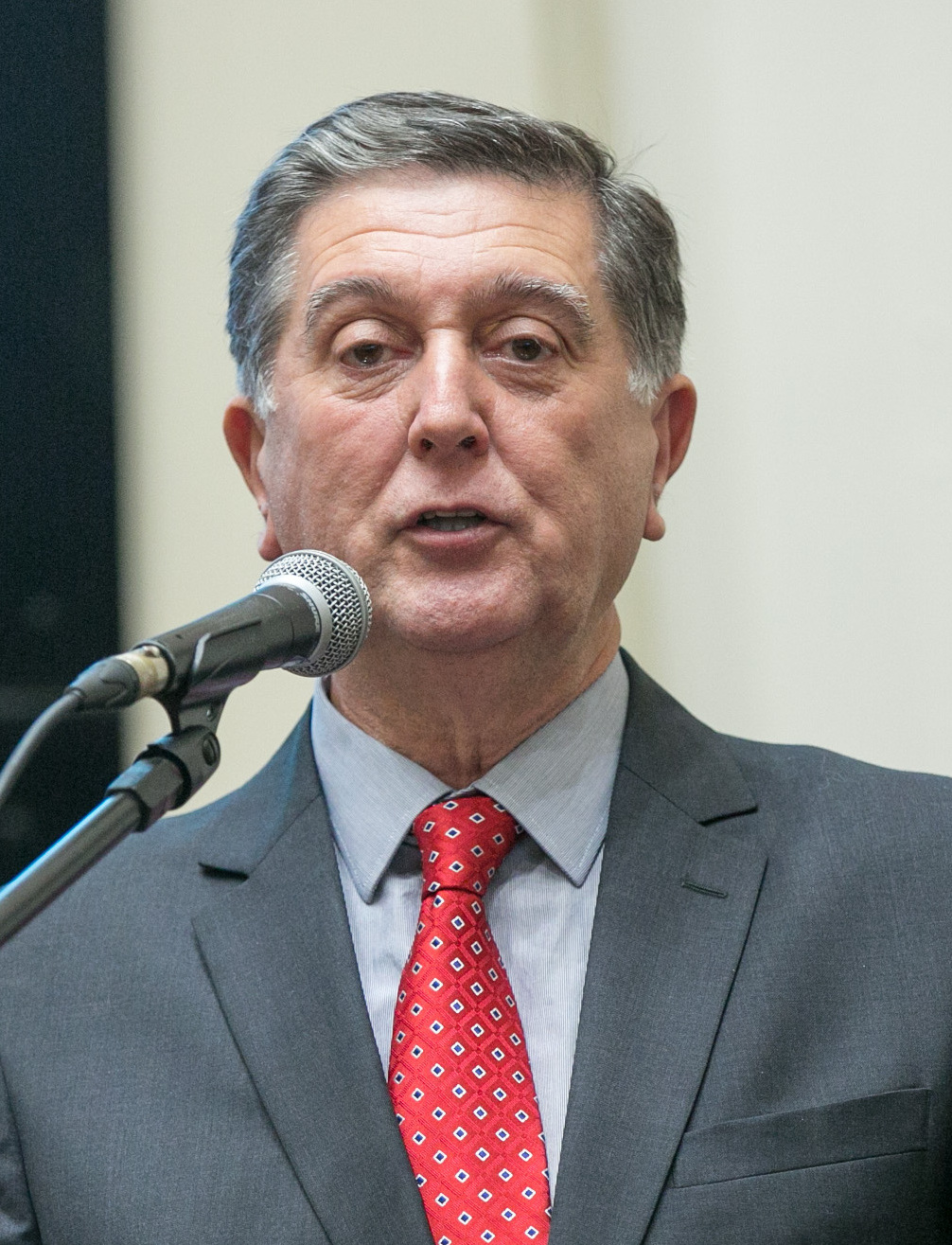

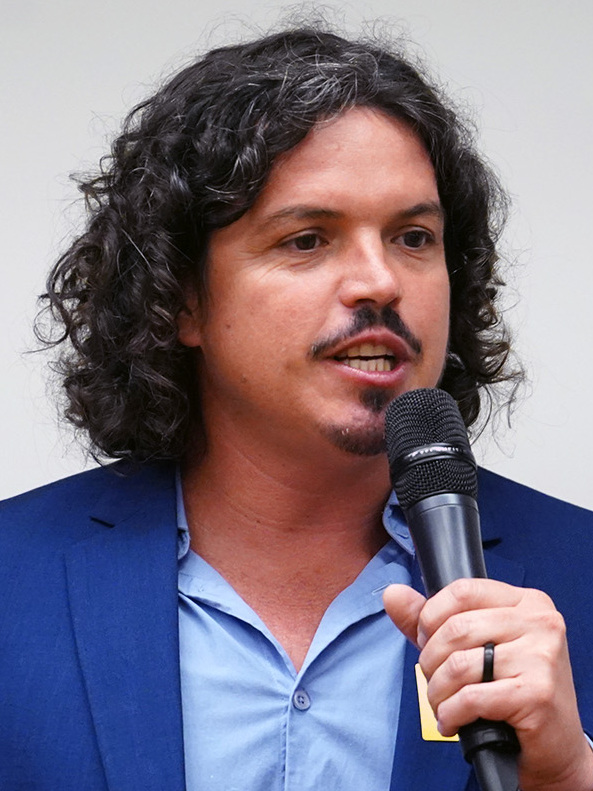
Nominee	Topázio Neto	Marquito
Party	PSD	PSOL
Running mate	Maryanne Mattos	Cláudia Zininha
Popular vote	161,839	61,509
Percentage	58.49%	22.23%
Mayor before election
Topázio Neto
PSD
Elected mayor
Topázio Neto
PSD

The 2024 Florianópolis municipal election took place in the city of Florianópolis, Brazil on 6 October 2024. Voters elected a mayor, vice mayor, and 43 councillors.

The incumbent mayor, Topázio Neto, of the PSD, the vice mayor elected in 2020 as a member of the Republicanos, took office on March 31, 2022, with the resignation of the incumbent, Gean Loureiro (UNIÃO). Loureiro unsuccessfully ran for governor of Santa Catarina.

Topázio Neto was elected in the first round to his first full term with the support of former president Jair Bolsonaro.

== Results ==
=== Mayor ===
Candidate	Running mate	Party	Votes	%
Topázio Neto (incumbent)	Maryanne Mattos (PL)	Social Democratic Party	161,839	58.49
Marquito	Claudia Zininha	Socialism and Liberty Party	61,509	22.23
Pedrão Silvestre	Marcelo Pontes	Progressistas	19,640	7.10
Dário Berger	Maria Claúdia Goulart (UNIÃO)	Brazilian Social Democracy Party	16,750	6.05
Vanderlei Lela	Ana Carolina Andrade (PSB)	Workers' Party	16,001	5.78
Rogério Portanova	Katia Carvalho	Avante	602	0.22
Carlos Muller	Roque	United Socialist Workers' Party	143	0.05
Brunno Dias	Luiz Bento	Workers' Cause Party	95	0.03
Mateus Souza	Olindina Corrêa	Brazilian Woman's Party	94	0.03
Total			276,673	100.00
Valid votes			276,673	93.60
Invalid votes			10,955	3.71
Blank votes			7,964	2.69
Total votes			295,592	100.00
Registered voters/turnout			410,812	71.95
PSD hold				

Popular vote (first round)
Topázio	58.49%
Marquito	22.23%
Pedrão	7.10%
Dário	6.05%
Others	6.13%
