= Rodrigo Gurgel =

Brazilian literary critic and professor of literature

Rodrigo Gurgel (born 1955) is a Brazilian literary critic and professor of literature. Gurgel was the controversial critic of Jabuti Award 2012 who gave very low notes to books released by personalities that year, for which he was called the Jurado "C" ("C" judge). His notes were criticized by Leftist journalists.

For 13 years, Gurgel was a pupil of the Brazilian writer Olavo de Carvalho (1947-2022), who taught philosophy at an online course started in 2009. When Olavo died, on January 25, 2022, Gurgel wrote a eulogy to him. Gurgel is among the most important Brazilian Conservative literary critics.

== Books ==
- Muita Retórica - Pouca Literatura. Vide Editorial, 2012. ISBN 9788562910104
- Crítica, Literatura e Narratofobia. Vide Editorial, 2015. ISBN 978-8567394718
- Esquecidos e Superestimados. Vide Editorial. 2016. ISBN 9788567394176
- Percevejos, ideólogos — e alguns escritores. Vide Editorial, 2019. ISBN 9788595070752
