= José Osvaldo de Meira Penna =

Brazilian writer (1917–2017)

José Osvaldo de Meira Penna (March 14, 1917 – July 29, 2017) was a Brazilian classical liberal writer and diplomat. He was one of the exponents of Brazilian classical liberalism, Austrian School and conservatism, a member of the Mont Pèlerin Society, and one of the greatest proponents of graduation courses and study centers dedicated to the analysis of International Relations in Brazil.

== Works ==
- 2006: Polemos: uma análise crítica do Darwinismo
- 2004: Nietzsche e a Loucura ISBN 9788574390543
- 2002: Quando mudam as capitais
- 2002: Da moral em economia
- 2001: Cândido Pafúncio
- 2001: Ai que Dor de Cabeça! ISBN 9788573726220
- 2001: Urânia ISBN 8587638645
- 1999: Em Berço Esplêndido - Ensaios de psicologia coletiva brasileira.
- 1995: Elefantes e Nuvens
- 1994: A Ideologia do século XX
- 1997: O Espírito das Revoluções
- 1992: Decência já!
- 1991: Opção Preferencial Pela Riqueza
- 1988: Utopia Brasileira. ISBN 9788531907548
- 1988: O Dinossauro
- 1982: O Evangelho Segundo Marx
- 1980: O Brasil na idade da Razão
- 1980: Elogio do Burro.
- 1974: Em berço esplêndido.
- 1972: Psicologia do subdesenvolvimento. ISBN 9788595070042
- 1967: Política externa, segurança e desenvolvimento
- 1948: O sonho de Sarumoto
- 1944: Shanghai - Aspectos Históricos da China Moderna
