= Luís Ernesto Lacombe =

Brazilian journalist

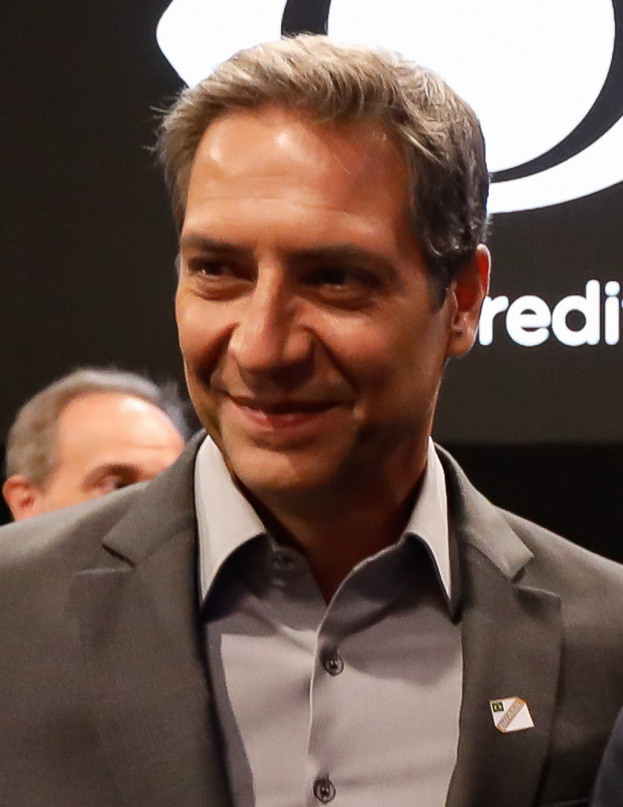
Luís Ernesto Lacombe in February 2020.

Luís Ernesto Lacombe Heilborn (Rio de Janeiro, August 2, 1966) is a Brazilian journalist and writer.

He is the grandson of Américo Jacobina Lacombe, a member of Academia Brasileira de Letras.

In 1988, he graduated in journalism at Faculdades Integradas Hélio Alonso.

He is a conservative.

== Career ==
He worked for Rede Globo, Bandeirantes and RedeTV.

== Books ==
In Portuguese.

- Ilha de Santa Catarina, Jardim do Brasil", 1997.
- E aí, bicho?, 2010. ISBN 9788563877055
- Manual Poético dos Esportes Olímpicos – e um dedinho de prosa, 2013.
- Cartas de Elise - uma história brasileira sobre o nazismo, 2016.
