= Brunny Gomes =

Brazilian politician

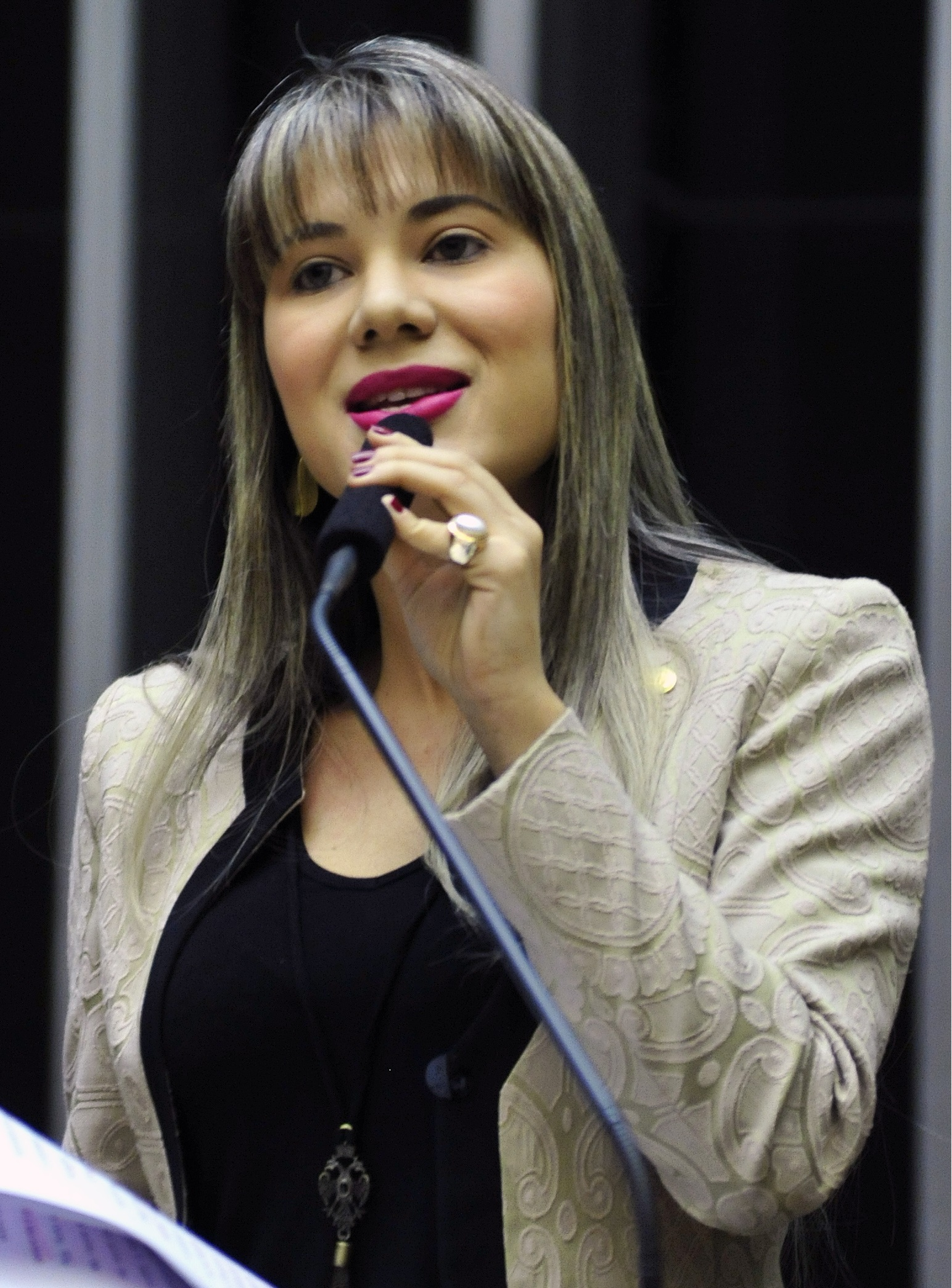
- Brunny in May 2015

Federal Deputy for Minas Gerais
- In office 1 February 2015 – 31 January 2019

Personal details
- Born: 21 August 1989 (age 37) Governador Valadares, Minas Gerais, Brazil
- Party: PL (2016-present); PMB (2013-2016); PTC (2009-2013)

Bruniele Ferreira Gomes (born 21 August 1989) more commonly known as Brunny Gomes or Brunny is a Brazilian politician and television presenter. She has spent her political career representing her home state of Minas Gerais, having served as state representative from 2015 to 2019.

== Personal life ==
She is the daughter of Adalberto Ferreira da Silva and Irani Aparecida da Silva. Before becoming a politician she was the hostess of the television program Brunny e Vc a local television show shown primarily in her hometown of Governador Valadares and broadcast by TV Alterosa. Gomes is married to Hélio Gomes, a businessman and politician who serves in the Minas Gerais state legislature and is 37 years the senior of Brunny.

== Political career ==
Gomes was elected to the chamber of deputies at the age of only 25 in the 2014 Brazilian general election, with 45,381 votes.

Gomes voted against the impeachment process of then-president Dilma Rousseff. Gomes voted in favor the 2017 Brazilian labor reform, and would vote against a corruption investigation into Rousseff's successor Michel Temer.
