= João Camilo de Oliveira Torres =

Brazilian writer, professor, historian, and journalist (1915–1973)

- Born: July 31, 1915
- Died: January 31, 1973 (aged 57)
- Occupations: Writer; professor; historian; journalist

João Camilo de Oliveira Torres (July 31, 1915 – January 31, 1973) was a Brazilian writer, professor, historian, journalist and monarchist. He was a major figure of Conservatism in Brazil.

== Biography ==
Torres graduated in philosophy from the National Faculty of Philosophy (FNFi), successor of the UDF, extinguished when his brother Luís Camilo de Oliveira Neto was vice-rector in office (1939). He began writing for newspapers in 1937. Five years later he was professor of Moral Philosophy at the Faculty of Philosophy of UFMG and History of Brazil at The Santa Maria College (now PUC-Minas), also of Belo Horizonte.

Torres was a professor at the Pontifical Catholic University of Minas Gerais, the Federal University of Minas Gerais and the Minas Gerais University, and was a member of the Minas Gerais Academy of Letters (chair no. 39), of the Minas Gerais Institute of Geography and History, Minas Gerais Council of Culture. A career employee of the IAPC, he died at his desk as superintendent of the INPS.

== Books ==
In Portuguese.

- Homem e a Montanha. Livraria Cultura Brasileira, Belo Horizonte, 1944 (1ª ed.) e Autentica, Belo Horizonte, 2011 (2ª ed.)
- O Positivismo no Brasil. Editora Vozes, Petrópolis, 1943 (1ª ed.) e 1957 (2ª ed.), ISBN 978-85-402-0554-3
- Libertação do Liberalismo. Casa do Estudante, Rio de Janeiro, 1949.
- A Crise da Previdência Social no Brasil . Ed. Dialogo, Belo Horizonte, 1954.
- A Democracia Coroada. José Olympio, Rio de Janeiro, 1957 (1ª ed.) e Editora Vozes, Petrópolis, 1964 (2ª ed.) e Edições Câmara, DF, 2017 (3ª ed.), ISBN 978-85-402-0666-3
- Do Governo Régio. Editora Vozes, Petrópolis, 1958.
- Educação e Liberdade. Editora Vozes, Petrópolis, 1958.
- A Propaganda Política. Ed. R. B. E. P., Belo Horizonte, 1959.
- Propaganda Política, Natureza Limites. Ed. R. B. E. P., Belo Horizonte, 1959.
- História de Minas Gerais. Difusão Pan-Americana do livro, Belo Horizonte, 1961-1962 (1ª ed.) e 1967 (2ª ed.)
- Formação do Federalismo no Brasil. Coleção Brasiliana, Cia. Editora Nacional, São Paulo, 1961. ISBN 978-85-402-0660-1
- As aventuras de João Surrinha (conto para crianças). Editora do Brasil S/A, São Paulo, 1961.
- Um Mundo em Busca de Segurança. Herder, Ed. e Livraria Ltda., São Paulo, 1961.
- Harmonia Política. Itatiaia, Belo Horizonte, 1962.
- Cartilha do Parlamentarismo. Itatiaia, Belo Horizonte, 1962.
- O Presidencialismo no Brasil . Coleções Brasílica, Edições "O Cruzeiro", Rio de Janeiro, 1962.
- Desenvolvimento e Justiça: Em Torno da Encíclica "Mater et Magistra". Editora Vozes, Petrópolis, 1962.
- Teoria Geral da História. Editora Vozes, Petrópolis, 1963.
- História do Império (para a juventude). Distribuidora Record, Rio de Janeiro, 1963.
- História de Minas Gerais (para a juventude). Distribuidora Record, Rio de Janeiro, 1963 (1ª ed.) e 1967 (2ª ed.)
- Razão e Destino da Revolução. Editora Vozes, Petrópolis, 1964.
- El Cid (para a juventude). Distribuidora Record, Rio de Janeiro, 1964.
- A Aurora da Civilização (para a juventude). Distribuidora Record, Rio de Janeiro, 1964.
- A Revolução Francesa (para a juventude). Distribuidora Record, Rio de Janeiro, 1964.
- Estratificação Social no Brasil. Difel, São Paulo, 1965. ISBN 978-85-402-0690-8
- Instituições Políticas e Sociais do Brasil . FTD, São Paulo, 1965.
- O Conselho de Estado. Ed. G. R. D., Rio de Janeiro, 1965.
- Significação da História do Brasil. Mec, Brasília, 1967
- Estudos Sociais Brasileiros. Ed. Júpiter, Belo Horizonte, 1968.
- Lazer e Cultura. Editora Vozes, Petrópolis, 1968.
- Educação Moral e Cívica. Ed. Júpiter, Belo Horizonte, 1968.
- Os Construtores do Império. Coleção Brasiliana, Cia. Editora Nacional, São Paulo, 1968. ISBN 978-85-402-0655-7
- História das Idéias Religiosas no Brasil .Ed. Grijalbo, São Paulo, 1968
- Natureza e Fins da Sociedade Política. Editora Vozes, Petrópolis, 1968.
- Interpretação da Realidade Brasileira. José Olympio, Rio de Janeiro, 1969. ISBN 978-85-402-0664-9
- O Ocaso do Socialismo: À Margem da Encíclica “Populorum Progressio”. Ed. Agir, Rio de Janeiro, 1969.
- A Igreja de Deus em Belo Horizonte. Ed. do autor, Belo Horizonte, 1971.
- A Idéia Revolucionária no Brasil. Editora IBRASA, São Paulo, 1981.
- O Elogio do Conservadorismo. Arcádia Editora, São Paulo, 2017.
