= São Luís Gonzaga do Maranhão =

Coordinates: 4.38°S 44.67°W

- Municipality
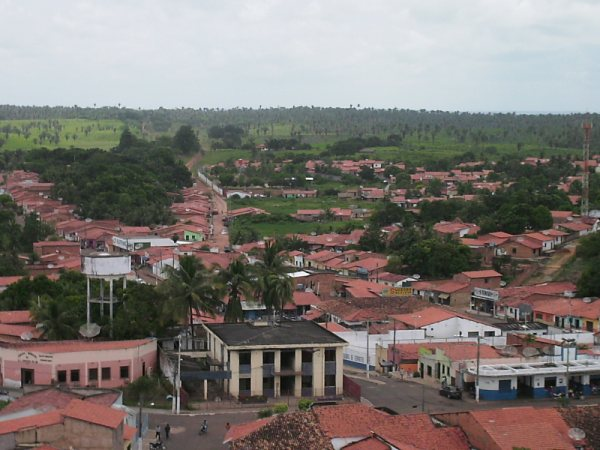
- View of São Luís Gonzaga do Maranhão
- Interactive map of São Luís Gonzaga do Maranhão
- Country: Brazil
- Region: Nordeste
- State: Maranhão
- Mesoregion: Centro Maranhense

Population (2020)
  - Total: 18,727
- Time zone: UTC−3 (BRT)

São Luís Gonzaga do Maranhão is a municipality in the state of Maranhão in the Northeast region of Brazil.

== See also ==
- List of municipalities in Maranhão
