= Sister Miriam Joseph =

Professor of education and religious sister

Sister Miriam Joseph Rauh, C.S.C., PhD (1898–1982) was a member of the Sisters of the Holy Cross. She received her doctorate from Columbia University and was Professor of English at Saint Mary's College from 1931 to 1960. She is the author of several books including The Trivium (1937), a text she developed as part of the core curriculum of Saint Mary's College. In her preface to the 1947 edition, she writes, "This book owes its inception .. to professor Mortimer J. Adler of the University of Chicago, whose inspiration and instruction gave it initial impulse." She also acknowledges debt to Aristotle, John Milton, and Jacques Maritain. It discusses the medieval liberal arts education based upon grammar, logic, and rhetoric.

== Books and writings ==
=== Published books ===
- Textbook: The Trivium in College Composition and Reading
  - Joseph, Sister Miriam (1937). The Trivium Integrated with College Composition (1st ed.).
  - Joseph, Sister Miriam (2002) [1948]. McGlinn, Marguerite (ed.). The Trivium: The Liberal Arts of Logic, Grammar, and Rhetoric (3rd ed.). ISBN 978-0967967509.
  - Joseph, Sister Miriam (2014) [1948]. The Trivium in College Composition and Reading (3rd ed.). ISBN 978-1614276869.
- Joseph, Sister Miriam (2005) [1947]. Shakespeare's Use of the Arts of Language. ISBN 978-1589880252.
- Joseph, Sister Miriam (1962). Rhetoric in Shakespeare's time: Literary theory of Renaissance Europe. ISBN 0156770946.
- Joseph, Sister Miriam (1940). Everyday Logic.
- Joseph, Sister Miriam (1954). Orthodoxy in Paradise Lost.

=== Coauthored book ===
- References to Women in the Epistles of Cicero, Seneca, and Pliny. 1954.

=== Other writings ===
- Joseph, Miriam (April 1962). "Hamlet, a Christian Tragedy". Studies in Philology. 59 (2). University of North Carolina Press: 119–141. JSTOR 4173378.
- Joseph, Miriam (1959). "A 'Trivial' Reading of Hamlet". Laval Théologique et Philosophique. 15 (2). Laval theological and philosophical (Laval théologique et philosophique), Laval University: 182–214. doi:10.7202/1019978ar. ISSN 1703-8804.

== See also ==
- Classical education movement
