= Katia Sastre =

Brazilian politician (born 1976)

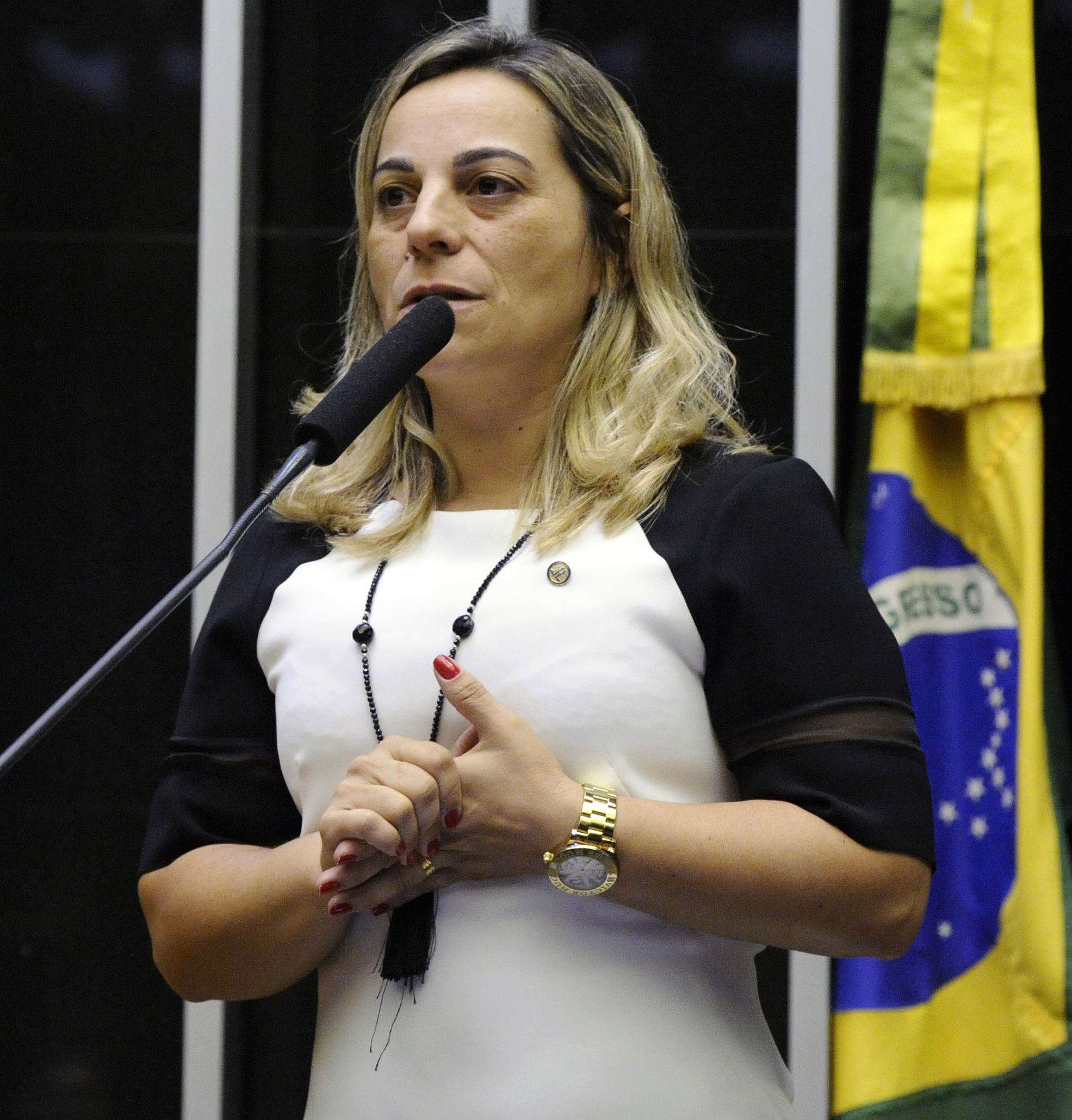
- Sastre in 2019

Member of the Chamber of Deputies
- In office 1 February 2019 – 31 January 2023
- Constituency: São Paulo

Personal details
- Born: 4 April 1976 (age 50)
- Party: Liberal Party (since 2018)

Katia da Silva Sastre (born 4 April 1976) is a Brazilian politician. From 2019 to 2023, she was a member of the Chamber of Deputies. From 2022 to 2023, she served as chairwoman of the women's rights committee.
