= Trivium =

First three liberal arts of traditional education

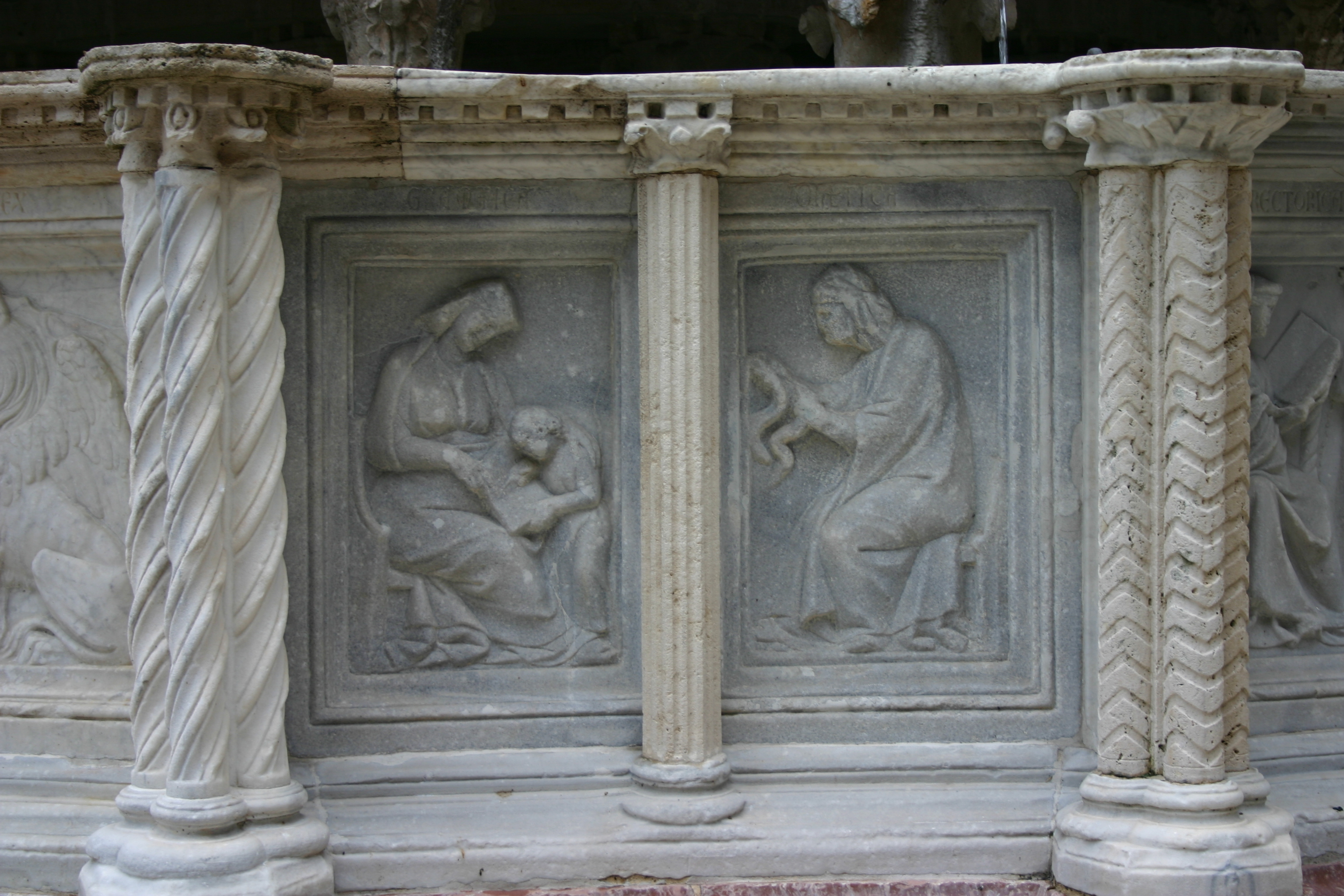
Allegory of Grammar and Logic/Dialectic. Perugia, Fontana Maggiore.

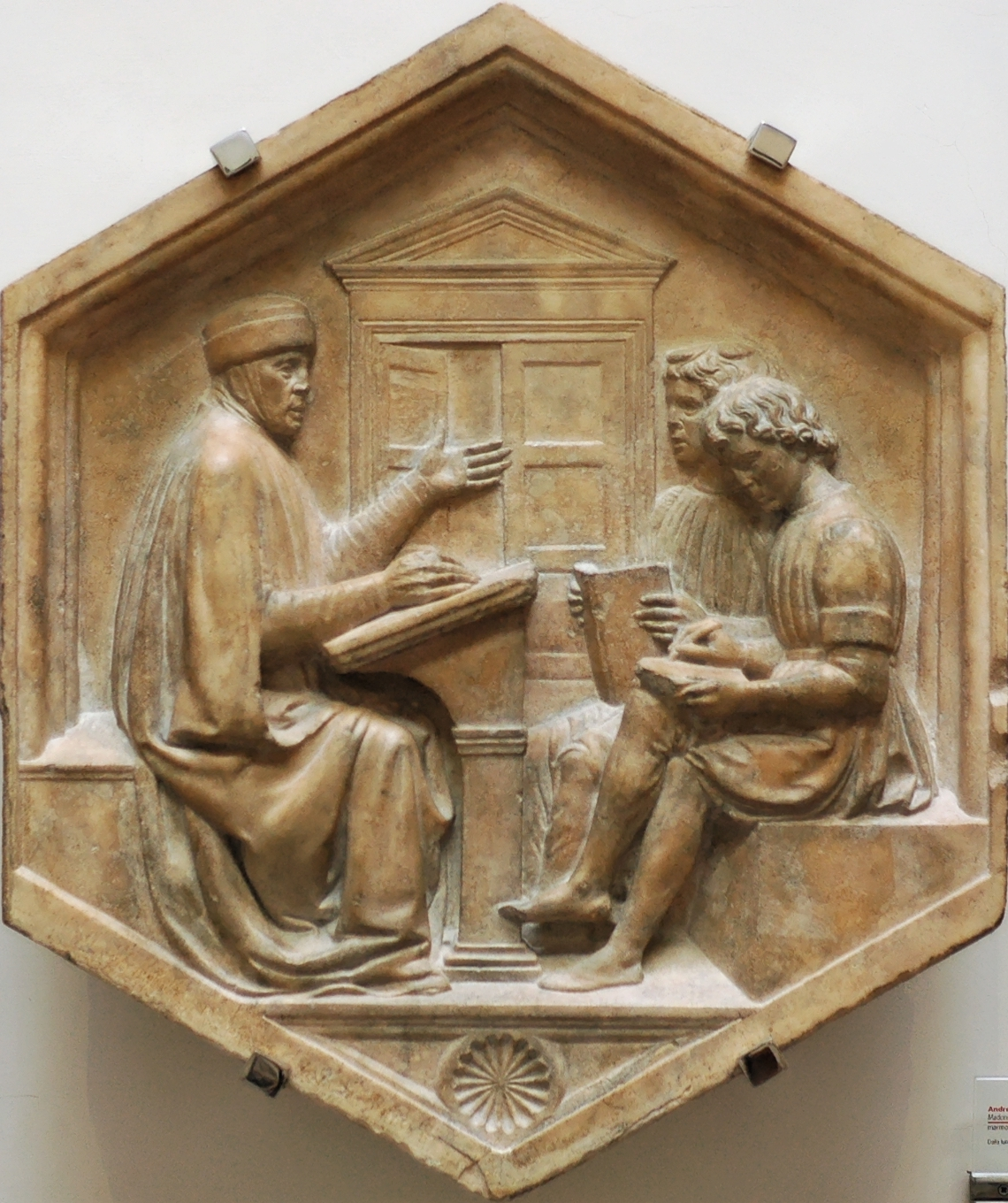
Allegory of Grammar. Priscian on the left teaches Latin grammar to his students on the right. Relief by Luca della Robbia. Florence, Museo dell'Opera del Duomo.

The trivium is the lower division of the seven liberal arts and comprises grammar, logic, and rhetoric.

The trivium is implicit in De nuptiis Philologiae et Mercurii ("On the Marriage of Philology and Mercury") by Martianus Capella, inspired by Marcus Terentius Varro and discourse surrounding his Novem Disciplinae ("Nine Disciplines"), but the term was not used until the Carolingian Renaissance, when it was coined in imitation of the earlier quadrivium. Grammar, logic, and rhetoric were essential to a classical education, as explained in Plato's dialogues. The three subjects together were denoted by the word trivium during the Middle Ages and with the quadrivium, constituted the educational curriculum of the Carolingian Renaissance, harmoniously implemented alongside more ecclesiastical teachings of the Church, but the tradition of first learning those three subjects was established in ancient Greece, by rhetoricians such as Isocrates. Contemporary iterations have taken various forms, including those found in certain British and American universities (some being part of the Classical education movement) and at the independent Oundle School in the United Kingdom.

== Etymology ==
Etymologically, the Latin word trivium means "the place where three roads meet" (tri + via); hence, the subjects of the trivium, Grammar, Logic, and Rhetoric, represents foundational knowledge, the practice of thinking and questioning, the ability to express oneself persuasively respectively, and serve as the foundation for the quadrivium, the upper (or "further") division of the medieval education in the liberal arts, which consists of arithmetic (numbers as abstract concepts), geometry (numbers in space), music (numbers in time), and astronomy (numbers in space and time). Educationally, the trivium and the quadrivium imparted to the student the seven liberal arts of classical antiquity.

== Description ==
Grammar teaches the mechanics of language to the student. This is the step where the student "comes to terms", defining the objects and information perceived by the five senses. Hence, the law of identity: a tree is a tree, and not a cat.

Logic (also dialectic) is the "mechanics" of thought and of analysis, the process of composing sound arguments and identifying fallacious arguments and statements, and so systematically removing contradictions, thereby producing factual knowledge that can be trusted. Its aim is to calculate what is certainly true or false.

Rhetoric is the application of language in order to instruct and to persuade the listener and the reader. It is the knowledge (grammar) now understood (logic) and being transmitted outwards as wisdom (rhetoric). Its aim is to identify what is most probably true or false where logical certainty is not possible.

Aristotle defined rhetoric as "the power of perceiving in every thing that which is capable of producing persuasion".

Sister Miriam Joseph, in The Trivium: The Liberal Arts of Logic, Grammar, and Rhetoric (2002), described the trivium as follows:

Grammar is the art of inventing symbols and combining them to express thought; logic is the art of thinking; and rhetoric is the art of communicating thought from one mind to another, the adaptation of language to circumstance.

...

Grammar is concerned with the thing as-it-is-symbolized. Logic is concerned with the thing as-it-is-known. Rhetoric is concerned with the thing as-it-is-communicated.

John Ayto wrote in the Dictionary of Word Origins (1990) that study of the trivium (grammar, logic, and rhetoric) was requisite preparation for study of the quadrivium (arithmetic, geometry, music, and astronomy). For the medieval student, the trivium was the curricular beginning of the acquisition of the seven liberal arts; as such, it was the principal undergraduate course of study. The word trivial arose from the contrast between the simpler trivium and the more difficult quadrivium.

== See also ==
- Classical education movement
- Quadrivium
- The three Rs
- Vedanga
