= Percival Puggina =

Brazilian politician (born 1944)

Percival Oliveira Puggina (born in Santana do Livramento, state of Rio Grande do Sul, Brazil, on December 17, 1944) is a Brazilian politician, architect, writer and journalist.

== Biography ==
Son of Adolfo Puggina and Eloah Oliveira, he is an expert in the Catholic Church's Social Doctrine, being one of the greatest critics of Liberation Theology. He created the Tarso Dutra Foundation for Political Studies and Public Administration, an organ of the Progressive Party. He also participated in the series Brasil Paralelo. He is a member of the Rio-Grandense Academy of Letters.

Since the 1980s, he also devoted himself to literary activity and the political chronicle, writing weekly for hundreds of newspapers, magazines, websites and blogs throughout the country. It has published thousands of texts and essays since then. In 2002, he created the company Texto e Contexto Comunicação Ltda., of which he is a director. In 2014 he left the Progressive Party.

== Journalism ==
He writes weekly articles for several newspapers in Rio Grande do Sul, including Zero Hora, as well as writing his own blog and on other nationally speaking websites, such as Mídia Sem Máscara, Diário do Poder, Tribuna da Internet. His column is reproduced by more than a hundred newspapers.

== Books ==
In Portuguese.

- Crônicas contra o totalitarismo
- Cuba, a tragédia da utopia
- Pombas e Gaviões, Editora AGE
- A tomada do Brasil pelos maus brasileiros, Editora Concreta
- Obra coletiva Desconstruindo Paulo Freire, Edição História Expressa
- Obra coletiva Lanterna na proa Roberto Campos ano 100, Editora Resistência Cultural
