= General Girão =

Brazilian politician

Eliéser Girão Monteiro Filho
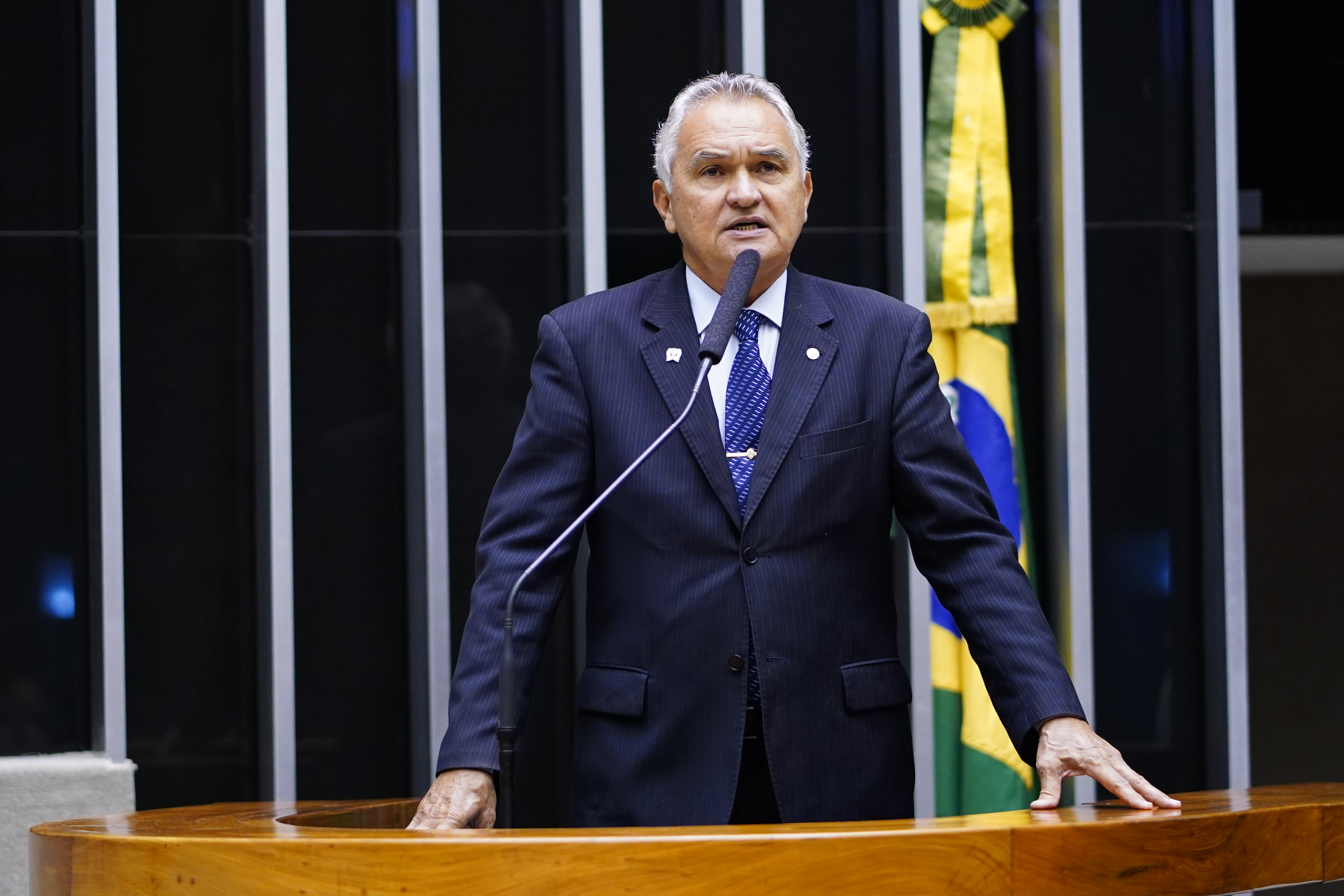

Federal Deputy for Rio Grande do Norte
- In office 1 February 2019 – Incumbent

Personal details
- Born: 8 May 1955 (age 71) Fortaleza, Ceará, Brazil
- Party: PSDB (2009–2013); PMN (2013–2016); PSL (2016–2022); UNIÃO (2022); PL (Since 2022)
- Occupation: Military and Politician

Military service
- Allegiance: Brazil
- Branch/service: Brazilian Army
- Years of service: 1973–2009
- Rank: Brigadier general

Eliéser Girão Monteiro Filho, also known as General Girão (8 May 1955), is a Brazilian politician and military officer, affiliated to the PL. He is currently a federal deputy for the state of Rio Grande do Norte.

== Biography ==
Girão was born in Fortaleza, on 8 May 1955. He joined the Brazilian Army in February 1973. He graduated in Military Sciences at the Military Academy of Agulhas Negras – AMAN, on 14 December 1976, being declared an Aspirant-to-Officer of the Infantry Weapon.

He has all the military courses required for the full career of an officer in the Brazilian Army. In the rank of Captain, Girão completed the Infantry Weapons Officer Training Course at the School for the Improvement of Officers – ESAO. As a senior officer, he completed the Army Command and Staff Courses and the Army Policy, Strategy and Senior Management Course, both from the Army Command and Staff School – ECEME.

General Girão has the following Operational Courses: Operations in the Jungle, Operations in the Caatinga, Basic Parachutist; Jump Master and Loading Master.

Throughout his military career, he obtained professional experiences in fulfilling specific missions in Infantry units, as well as in performing the functions of Instructor in Educational Establishments, Training of Active and Reserve Officers, Improvement and Specialization of Officers.

== Military career ==
General Girão commanded the Brigade Command Company, in Recife (PE), was General Staff Officer in Battalions and Brigades, standing out in the Parachutist, Jungle, Caatinga and Motorized Infantry Troops. He served as Deputy and Chief of Subchefia of the Military House of the Presidency of the Republic, in Brasília (DF), between 1996 and 1999. He commanded the 7th Jungle Infantry Battalion – 7th BIS, in Roraima, between 2000 and 2001. After the Battalion Command de Selva, Girão held the diplomatic post of Military Defense Attaché for two years in the Republic of Poland.

Abroad, in addition to the specific duties of the attaché, Girão gave lectures on Brazil, the Armed Forces and the Amazon, in institutions of secondary and higher education, civil and military. Upon returning to Brazil, he served as Subcomandante of the School for the Improvement of Officers – ESAO, in 2005 and 2006, at the time commanded by the Former Army Commander, General Villas Boas.

Girão was promoted to the rank of Brigadier General in 2007. He commanded the 1st Jungle Infantry Brigade, in Roraima, until mid-2008. He returned to Brasília to assume the Transport and Mobilization Directorate of the Army Logistics Command and Chief of the Planning Office and Management of the same Logistics Command until 2009.

He served for 36 years as Ativa of Brazilian Army, in the cities of Natal (RN), Resende (RJ), Recife (PE), Rio de Janeiro (RJ), Petrópolis (RJ), Boa Vista (RR), Brasília (DF) and Warsaw (Poland).

Throughout his military career, in Brazil and abroad, Girão was awarded with military and civilian decorations, national and foreign. In total, he has 38 decorations.

When he moved to the Reserve, on request, on 31 March 2009, he assumed the Secretariat of Public Security of the State of Roraima, having remained until February 2012. As Secretary of Security for the State of Roraima, he held leadership roles with the College National Security Secretaries (CONSESP), idealizing the creation of Thematic Chambers for the study and presentation of proposals to the Ministry of Justice that would give more flexibility, efficiency and effectiveness to Public Security actions throughout the country.

In 2012, Girão assumed the Secretariat of Justice and Citizenship of the State of Roraima, having also been the President of the State Council on Drug Policy. He was the creator and executor of Campaigns for the Prevention of Drug Use until July 2013.

In March 2014 he was invited to take over the Secretary of Public Security and Social Defense of the State of Rio Grande do Norte. He was in charge of the Public Security Portfolio during the World Cup games in the State of Rio Grande do Norte. The state capital was considered the best host city, in terms of Public Security, by a survey conducted by FIFA. General Girão was also President of the State Council for Combating Drugs in the State of Rio Grande do Norte.

Between January 2016 and March 2018, he was Municipal Secretary for Public Security, Civil Defense, Urban Mobility and Traffic in Mossoró (RN).

During his entire military career, as an Officer of the Brazilian Army and Commander of Military Units, as well as after his transition to the Reserve, as Secretary of State in two States of the Federation and one Municipality, Girão held the role of Expense Advisor, having been approved in all accounts, without any restriction, in the Internal and External Account Control Bodies.

== Politics ==
He ran for the post of Federal Deputy in 2018, for the PSL. After a long political campaign, where he traveled more than 40 thousand kilometers within the State of Rio Grande do Norte, visiting 117 of the 167 municipalities in the State, Girão was elected with 81,640 votes. He obtained at least one vote in each of the 167 municipalities.

It was the first time that the General ran for any elective office and did not obtain political support.

He is currently a Federal Deputy and holds the Vice Presidency of PSL-RN.

== Personal life ==
Girão is married to Graça Girão, with whom he has three children: Rodrigo, Mariana and Paulo Eduardo. He is Roman Catholic.
