= Major Olímpio =

Brazilian politician (1962–2021)

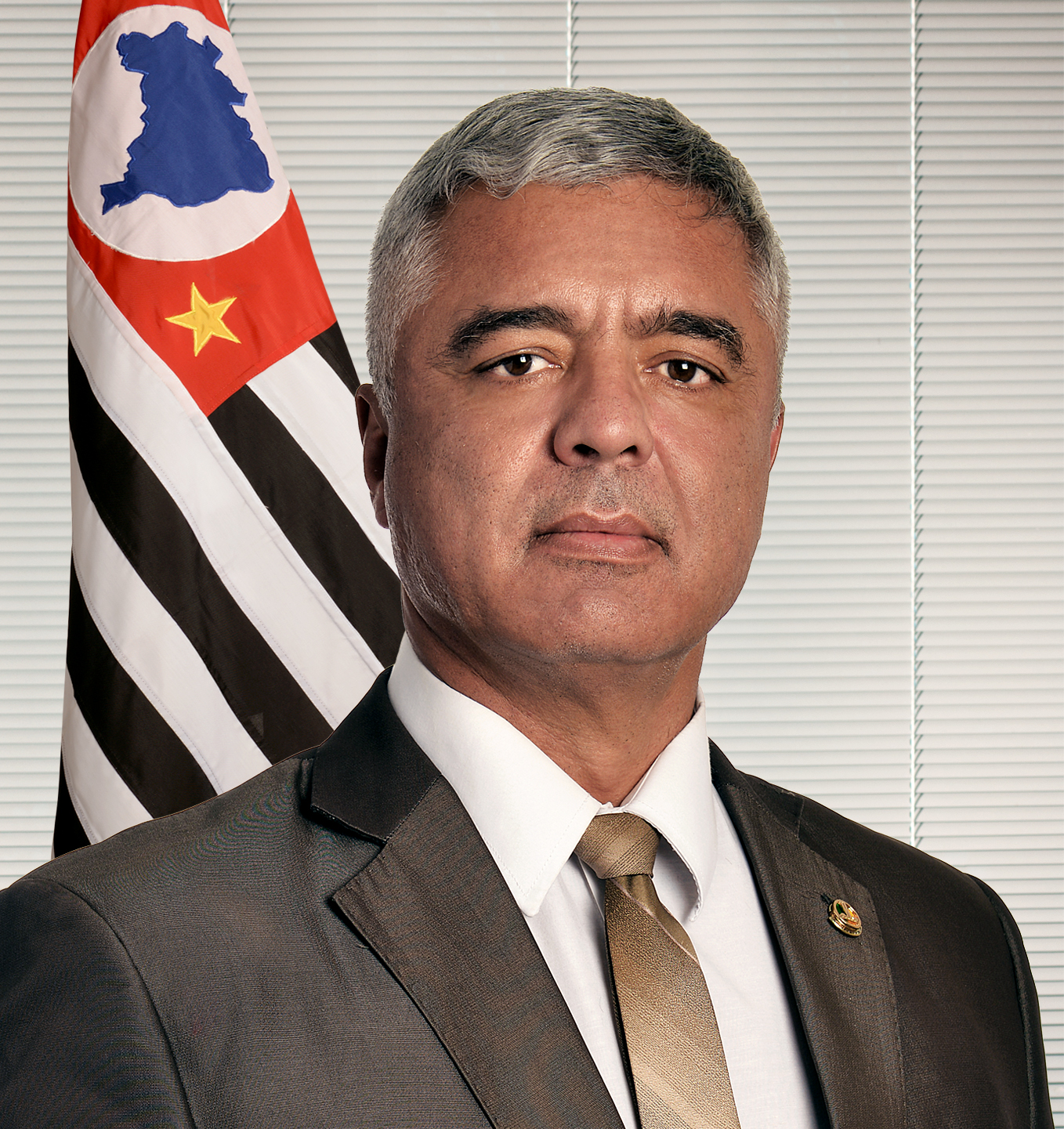

Senator for São Paulo
- In office 1 February 2019 – 18 March 2021

Senate PSL Leader
- In office 1 February 2019 – 18 March 2021
- Succeeded by: Soraya Thronicke

Federal Deputy for São Paulo
- In office 1 February 2015 – 1 February 2019

State Deputy of São Paulo
- In office 1 February 2007 – 1 February 2015

Personal details
- Born: Sérgio Olímpio Gomes; 20 March 1962 Presidente Venceslau, São Paulo, Brazil
- Died: 18 March 2021 (aged 58) São Paulo, Brazil
- Cause of death: COVID-19
- Party: PP (2002–06); PV (2006–10); PDT (2010–15); PMB (2015–16); Solidariedade (2016–18); PSL (2018–21)
- Profession: Police officer
- Website: www.majorolimpio.com.br

Military service
- Branch/service: Military Police of São Paulo State
- Years of service: 1978–2007
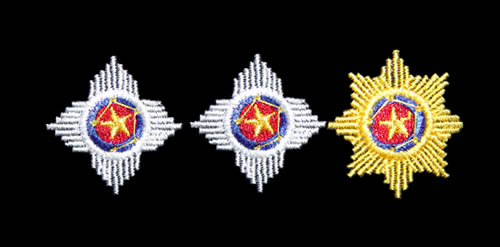
- Rank: Major

Sérgio Olímpio Gomes (20 March 1962 – 18 March 2021), best known as Major Olímpio, was a Brazilian police officer and politician, member of the Social Liberal Party (PSL). He was a state deputy for São Paulo, and leader of the Democratic Labor Party (PDT) during his term in the Legislative Assembly of São Paulo (ALESP). In the 2014 Brazilian general election, he was elected federal deputy for São Paulo. In 2018 he was elected to the Federal Senate.

== Biography ==
Sérgio Olímpio Gomes, a native of Presidente Venceslau, was a former president of the Paulista Association of Officials of the Military Police of São Paulo State. As an official, he was in office for 29 years. He received a bachelor's degree in judicial and social sciences. He has worked as a journalist, physical education teacher, technician in self-defense, shooting instructor and author of books focused in security issues. In 2006, he was elected state deputy with 52,386 votes, being re-elected in 2010 with 135,409 votes. In 2015, he started his first term as federal deputy after being elected in the 2014 elections with 179,196 votes. In 2006, he joined the Green Party, ran for state deputy and was elected.

In 2010, Olímpio joined the Democratic Labour Party and was re-elected state deputy. He later announced his candidacy for the government of São Paulo in the 2014 elections, but withdrew and launched candidacy for the federal Chamber of Deputies.

In June 2013, Olímpio criticized the mayor of São Paulo Fernando Haddad (PT) and the governor of São Paulo state Geraldo Alckmin (PSDB) for their posture facing the general protests, stating that both should be more focused in the next year's elections than with the violence and that they "lacked firm wrist".

Olímpio was leader of the PDT in the Legislative Assembly, which he left to take office in the Chamber of Deputies.

In 2015, Olímpio took office in his first term as federal deputy, having been elected in 2014 with 179,196 votes.

In November 2015, he left PDT and joined the newly created Brazilian Woman's Party (PMB). In March 2016, he joined Solidariedade.

During the swearing-in of former president Lula as Chief of Staff, on 17 March 2016, Olímpio shouted "Shame!", being hostilized by the guests and removed from the location by security guards.

Olímpio was the candidate to the Prefecture of São Paulo in the 2016 election as a member of Solidariedade. He received 116,870 votes.

Olímpio voted in favor of the impeachment of Dilma Rousseff in 2016. During the government of Michel Temer, he voted against the "Ceiling" of Public Spending Bill. In April 2017, he was against the Labour Reform. In August and October 2017, Olímpio supported a request to open an investigation against president Michel Temer.

He was a Freemason.

Olímpio died of COVID-19 on 18 March 2021 during the COVID-19 pandemic in Brazil. He became the third Senator to die of COVID after Arolde de Oliveira (PSD-RJ) in October and José Maranhão (MDB-PB) in February.

== Bibliography ==
- Olímpio Gomes, Sérgio; Anhaia de Lemos, Marcio Tadeu (2002). Insegurança Pública e Privada - Basta de Hipocrisia!. Landmank. ISBN 8-588-78103-4.
