= Democrat (Brazil) =

Political party in Brazil

Democrat Democrata
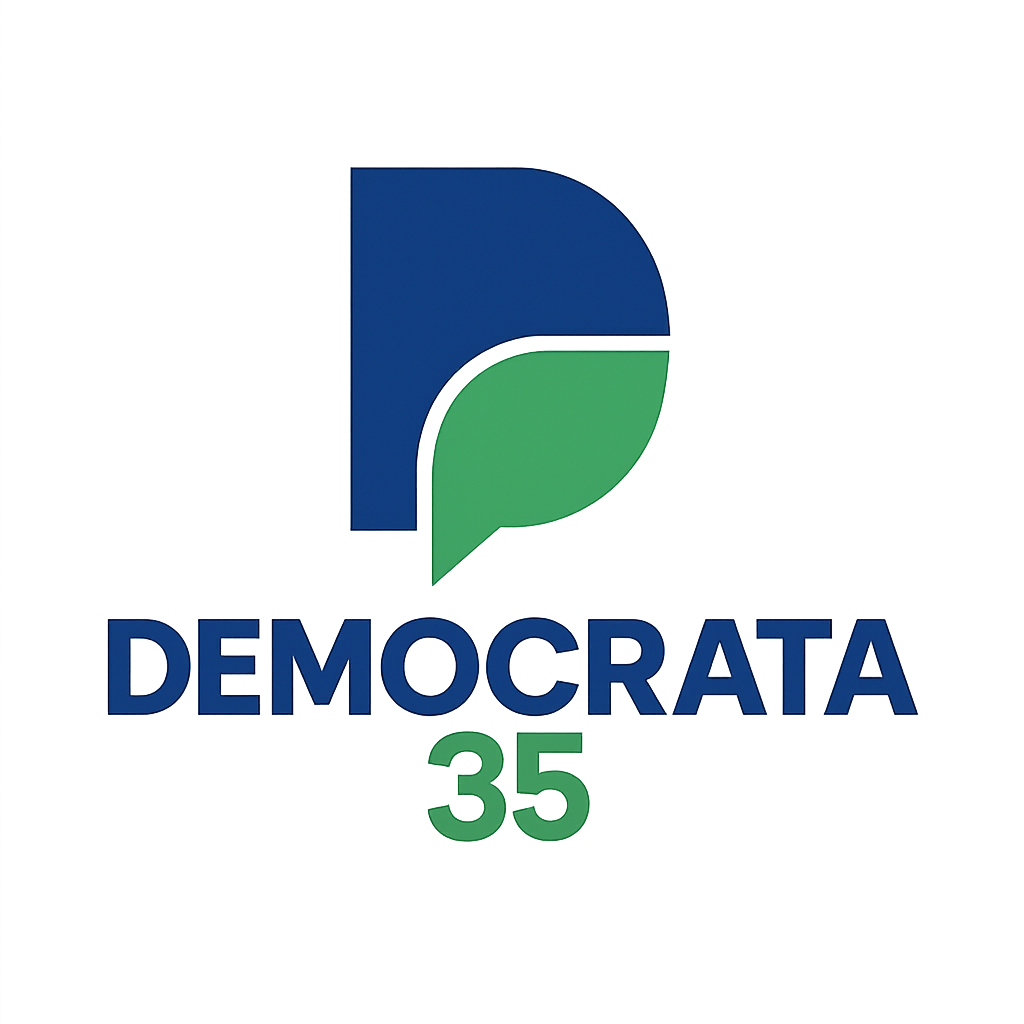
- President: Suêd Haidar Nogueira
- Founded: 2008
- Registered: 29 September 2015; 11 years ago
- Membership (2024): ▲56,166
- Ideology: Social conservatism
- Political position: Center-right
- Colors: Dark blue
- Party number: 35
- Legislative Assemblies: 3 / 1,024
- Mayors: 2 / 5,569
- Municipal Chambers: 109 / 58,208

Website
- pmb.org.br

Democrat (Portuguese: Democrata), originally founded with the name Brazilian Woman's Party, (Portuguese: Partido da Mulher Brasileira, PMB) is a social conservative political party in Brazil which uses the number 35. Known for its anti-feminist and anti-abortion stance, the party is not represented in the National Congress.

The PMB was founded in 2015 by Sued Haidar, who doubled as the president of the party's National Committee. At its peak, the party was the tenth largest in Congress, represented by 21 federal deputies in the Chamber of Deputies, only two of which were women, and one representative in the Federal Senate, Senator Hélio José. All later switched to other parties. In 2017, the party was condemned by the Superior Electoral Court of Minas Gerais for not having the minimum quota of women candidates. Most of the deputies have since left the party, and José switched his party affiliation to the Brazilian Democratic Movement Party in March 2016.

In January 2017, the PMB had 38,438 members. As of July 2018, this number has grown to 42,619.

On 2021, the party attempted to change its name to "Brasil 35", a modification made to attract the Brazilian president Jair Bolsonaro after he left his original Social Liberal Party and failed to create his own Alliance for Brazil, and mark the transition of the party to conservatism. However, in April 2022, the Superior Electoral Court (TSE) refused the name change, on the basis that "the change of the party's name to “Brasil”, [...] would have intense potential to generate confusion or mislead the electorate."

On 2 December 2025, the TSE approved a name change to Democrat (Portuguese: Democrata).

== Notable members ==
Current members
Name	Birth date	Relevant offices by PMB	Relevant offices by other parties
Abraham Weintraub	11 October 1971		Minister of Education (2019–2020)

Former members
Name	Birth date	Death date	Relevant offices by PMB	Relevant offices by other parties
Brunny Gomes	21 August 1989	living	Federal Deputy for Minas Gerais (2015–2019, by PL and PMB)	
Cabo Daciolo	30 March 1976	living		Federal Deputy for Rio de Janeiro (2015–2019, by Patriot, Avante and PSOL)
Marcelo Álvaro Antônio	16 February 1974	living	Federal Deputy for Minas Gerais (2015—present, by PL, UNIÃO, PSL, PMB, PRP, and PL)	Minister of Tourism (2019–2020, by PSL)
Major Olímpio	20 March 1962	18 March 2021	Federal Deputy for São Paulo (2015–2019, by PSL, Solidarity, PMB and PDT)	Senator for São Paulo (2019–2021, by PSL); State Deputy of São Paulo (2007–2015, by PV and PP)

== Election results ==
=== Legislative elections ===
Election	Chamber of Deputies				Federal Senate				Role in government
Election	Votes	%	Seats	+/–	Votes	%	Seats	+/–	Role in government
2018	228,302	0.23%	0 / 513	New	51,027	0.03%	0 / 81	New	Extra-parliamentary
2022	85,722	0.08%	0 / 513	0	61,350	0.06%	0 / 81	0	Extra-parliamentary
2026	27,195	0.02%	0 / 513	0	67,585	0.03%	0 / 81	0	Extra-parliamentary

== See also ==
- Category:Party of the Brazilian Woman politicians

Preceded by 33 - PNM (PMN)	Numbers of Brazilian Official Political Parties; 35 - Democrat (Democrata)	Succeeded by 36 - Act (Agir)
