= Inquiry 4781 =

Brazilian government inquiry

- Operation codename: Fake News Inquiry

Participants
- Initiated by: Supreme Federal Court
- Executed by: Primary judge (STF): Alexandre de Moraes; (Mar 2019 – Sep 2026); Edson Fachin; (Sep 2026 – Nov 2026)

Mission
- Target: Politicians, activists, journalists and businesspeople
- Objective: Investigate fake news, threats, and offenses against the STF and its members, including alleged plots against justices and the leak of officials' confidential data

Timeline
- Date begin: 14 March 2019
- Date end: 9 November 2026

Results
- Suspects: Classified

Inquiry 4781, known as the "Fake News Inquiry", and also the "Never-ending Inquiry" was an inquiry opened by the Brazilian Supreme Court (STF) to investigate the existence of fake news, false accusations, threats, and unauthorized reproduction of publications without proper copyright, offenses that may constitute slander, defamation, and libel against individuals. It has also examined possible links to plots to assassinate politicians and justices of the Supreme Court, destruction of public property, vandalism, and attempts to abolish the democratic rule of law.

Since it was opened, the inquiry has drawn criticism for its broad, undefined scope, its indefinite duration, and the manner in which it was instituted — opened ex officio by the Court itself, without a request from the Public Prosecutor's Office (PGR) or any other authority. The fact that the investigations are conducted by the rapporteur, Justice Alexandre de Moraes, without the participation of the PGR and without random distribution among the other justices, has also been criticized as problematic, insofar as it allows him to simultaneously act as investigator, prosecutor, judge, and alleged victim of the conduct under investigation. Compounding these concerns are criticisms of the inquiry's lack of transparency, having proceeded under seal for more than seven years without a clearly defined scope — prompting organizations such as the Brazilian Bar Association (OAB) to call for its closure on the grounds that it is of a "perpetual nature." The inquiry has also drawn opposition from both the political right, which characterizes it as an instrument of political persecution, and voices on the left, who have compared it to an instrument of exception akin to AI-5, the 1968 decree that granted the military dictatorship sweeping powers and suspended fundamental civil liberties.

On 9 September 2026, amid the fallout from the Banco Master scandal at the STF, the Court's Chief Justice, Justice Edson Fachin, decided to remove Justice Alexandre de Moraes as rapporteur of the inquiry and to take over the investigation himself. The decision upholds the validity of the actions Moraes had taken while he was in charge of the case. On 9 November 2026, following a favorable opinion from the Office of the Prosecutor General, Justice Edson Fachin ordered the definitive closure of the Inquiry.

== History ==
The inquiry was opened on 14 March 2019, by the Chief Justice of the Supreme Federal Court, Dias Toffoli, shortly after the justice became aware of offenses made by federal prosecutor Diogo Castor de Mattos, a member of Operation Car Wash, against the judiciary. The purpose of the inquiry, which proceeds under seal at the Court, is to investigate attacks and fake news involving the tribunal and its members. Its rapporteur was Justice Alexandre de Moraes.

The opening of the inquiry generated controversy since it was initiated without a request from another body, such as the Public Prosecutor's Office, the Office of the Prosecutor General, or a police authority. The investigation was justified on the basis of Article 43 of the STF's internal regulations, according to which, "should a criminal offense occur on the premises or under the jurisdiction of the Court, the president shall open an inquiry, if it involves an authority or person subject to its jurisdiction, or shall delegate this task to another justice." Alexandre de Moraes was then placed in charge of the case, without drawing lots among the justices.

The week after the inquiry was opened, Alexandre de Moraes ordered the blocking of social media accounts that spread hate speech against the STF. Searches were also ordered at addresses in São Paulo and Alagoas.

On 16 April 2019, the Federal Police launched an operation with search and seizure warrants, in which cell phones and computers were seized in São Paulo, Goiás, and Brasília as part of the Fake News Inquiry. The blocking of Twitter, Facebook, Instagram, and WhatsApp accounts belonging to those under investigation was also ordered. Among the targets was reserve general Paulo Chagas, a candidate for governor of the Federal District in the 2018 elections, who had criticized the Court on social media.

Alexandre de Moraes ordered the magazine Crusoé and the website O Antagonista to remove an article titled "O amigo do amigo do meu pai" ("My father's friend's friend"), which mentioned that the Chief Justice of the Court, Dias Toffoli, had been named by Marcelo Odebrecht in a plea bargain agreement related to Operation Car Wash. The article suggested that Dias Toffoli was a friend of former president Luiz Inácio Lula da Silva, who in turn was a friend of Emílio Odebrecht, the founder of the Odebrecht construction company (now Novonor) and Marcelo's father. According to Moraes himself, his decision stemmed from the fact that the Office of the Prosecutor General (PGR) had stated it had not received a document that would prove Toffoli was the person referred to by the code name. Several civil society organizations, such as the Brazilian Bar Association (OAB), journalists' associations, and some STF justices criticized the decision, calling it an act of censorship against freedom of the press. Afterward, once the PGR and the Supreme Court had "become aware of the document's content," Moraes reversed the measure and rejected the accusation of censorship. Bolsonaro subsequently congratulated Moraes.

In response, the then Prosecutor General, Raquel Dodge, decided to dismiss the inquiry, considering it unconstitutional. In a petition attached to the inquiry, she stated:

The accusatorial criminal justice system does not authorize the Judiciary to conduct a criminal investigation, particularly when it excludes the holder of criminal prosecution power, or when it imposes secrecy on that holder in the conduct of the investigation. These measures violate Article 129-I, II, VII, VIII, and § 2 of the Constitution. From this constitutional perspective — one of safeguarding the democratic regime, due process of law, and the accusatorial criminal justice system — the decision that ordered the ex officio opening of this inquiry, appointed its rapporteur without observing the principle of free distribution, and granted him investigative powers, undermined the guarantee of judicial impartiality in criminal matters, in addition to obstructing the access of the holder of criminal prosecution power to the investigation.

That same day, however, Moraes rejected the dismissal.

On 26 May 2020, the then Minister of Education, Abraham Weintraub, was added to the inquiry after having said, at a cabinet meeting held on 22 April — the contents of which became public on 22 May — "As far as I'm concerned, I'd put all those bums in jail. Starting with the STF."

=== Fake News Operation ===
On 27 May 2020, the Federal Police launched a new operation with search and seizure warrants in the Federal District, Rio de Janeiro, São Paulo, Mato Grosso, Paraná, and Santa Catarina against businesspeople, lawmakers, and digital influencers linked to Bolsonarism. A break in the banking and tax secrecy of four businesspeople suspected of financing fake news was also ordered. Among the targets were:

- Bia Kicis (PSL-DF), federal deputy, retired Federal District prosecutor;
- Carla Zambelli (PSL-SP), federal deputy and founder of Movimento Nas Ruas;
- Daniel Silveira (PSL-RJ), federal deputy and former Rio de Janeiro military police officer;
- Filipe Barros (PSL-PR), federal deputy, former city councilman of Londrina (PR), and lawyer;
- Cabo Junio Amaral (PSL-MG), federal deputy and retired military police officer of Minas Gerais;
- Luiz Philippe de Orléans e Bragança (PSL-SP), federal deputy;
- Douglas Garcia (PSL-SP), state deputy, vice-president of the conservative movement "Direita São Paulo";
- Gil Diniz (PSL-SP), known as "Carteiro Reaça," state deputy and PSL leader in the São Paulo State Assembly;
- Allan dos Santos, blogger for the website Terça Livre;
- Sara Winter, activist and leader of the "300 do Brasil" movement;
- Winston Lima, reserve captain, YouTuber, organizer of pro-Bolsonaro demonstrations, and coordinator of the "Bloco Movimento Brasil";
- Bernardo Küster, YouTuber, author, and director of Olavo de Carvalho's website "Brasil Sem Medo";
- Reynaldo Bianchi Junior, comedian known as "Rey Bianchi";
- Roberto Jefferson, former federal deputy and national president of the PTB;
- Luciano Hang, businessman, owner of the Havan retail chain;
- Edgard Corona, businessman, owner of the Smart Fit and BioRitmo gym chains;
- Marcos Belizzia, spokesperson for the "NasRuas" group;
- Otavio Fakhouri, businessman and contributor to the website "Crítica Nacional."
- Enzo Leonardo (Enzuh), YouTuber.
- Edson Salomão, chief of staff to state deputy Douglas Garcia.

According to a May 2020 survey by Aos Fatos, the deputies under investigation in the inquiry published an average of two social media posts per day over a three-month period containing disinformation or critical mentions of the STF.

=== Arrest of deputy Daniel Silveira ===
On 16 February 2021, federal deputy Daniel Silveira (PSL-RJ) was arrested in the act by the Federal Police, by order of Justice Alexandre de Moraes, after posting online videos in which he made offensive remarks and threats against Supreme Federal Court justices, called for the abolition of the Court, and called for a new Institutional Act No. 5 — considered the most repressive legal instrument of the Brazilian military dictatorship. The arrest falls under the scope of the Fake News Inquiry.

The arrest was unanimously confirmed by the full bench of the Court and upheld following a custody hearing. However, since the Constitution provides that the arrest of a member of Congress caught in the act must be submitted to the Chamber of Deputies for review, a vote was held on 19 February to approve the report of the rapporteur, deputy Magda Mofatto (PP-GO), who recommended that the lawmaker remain in custody. The Chamber of Deputies thus voted 364 to 130 to keep the deputy in prison.

=== Removal of a Telegram message ===
On 10 May 2023, Justice Alexandre de Moraes, the inquiry's rapporteur, ordered Telegram to remove a message opposing Bill 2630/2020 and to publish a new message stating that the previous one constituted "blatant and unlawful disinformation," under penalty of a 72-hour suspension in Brazil.

In an off-the-record interview with columnist Vera Rosa of Estadão, three justices of the Court admitted, "on background," that the inquiry functioned as a kind of shield for the Court.

=== Operation Exfil ===
In March 2026, the Federal Police launched Operation Exfil, also referred to as Operation Dataleaks, an intelligence operation aimed at dismantling a scheme for the illegal acquisition and sale of confidential tax data belonging to public officials and their relatives, including justices of the Supreme Federal Court and the Prosecutor General. Authorized by Justice Alexandre de Moraes under the Fake News Inquiry, the operation investigated unauthorized access to systems belonging to the Federal Revenue Service and the Council for Financial Activities Control (Coaf), revealing a structured chain involving public servants, outsourced employees, and intermediaries. The main target of the searches was businessman Marcelo Paes Fernandez Conde, suspected of commissioning the information through cash payments of about R$4,500 per access list. As of February 2026, three Federal Revenue Service employees and another employee of Serpro (the Federal Data Processing Service) had been arrested for disclosing and selling data.

== Criticism ==
Since it was opened, the inquiry has drawn criticism from legal scholars, lawmakers, and civil society organizations, concerning its legality, its limits, and the manner in which it has been conducted.

In an opinion piece for Jota, Horácio Neiva criticized the inquiry's broad, undefined scope, which he said appeared to reflect the Court's intent to claim for itself the power to investigate, accuse, and judge anyone who might criticize it in a tone or with words the Court itself deemed inappropriate.

The inquiry also drew criticism from Marco Aurélio and members of the Brazilian right, who described it as illegal and biased, given that the STF holds the power to investigate, judge, and convict.

The inquiry likewise drew criticism from the Brazilian left, with senator Randolfe Rodrigues stating shortly after it was opened that Toffoli and Moraes had fashioned a kind of Institutional Act No. 5 for themselves, an indirect reference to the coercive nature of Inquiry 4781.

In December 2025, the newspaper O Estado de S. Paulo published an editorial titled ''Sete anos de exceção'' ("Seven Years of Exception"), criticizing the continuation and nature of Inquiry 4781. The paper, which had supported the opening of the investigation in 2019 as an emergency response to attacks on the Supreme Federal Court (STF), argued that the inquiry had become an "instrument of personal power" for its rapporteur, Alexandre de Moraes, and a "symbol of his own institutional decline." The editorial claimed that the investigation's near seven-year continuation, conducted under seal and with an undefined scope, violates the Rule of Law and sets a "dangerous precedent for conflating opinion, journalistic criticism, and political dissent with criminal conduct," calling for its immediate closure as a "perpetual, secret, and unlimited" investigation.

In March 2026, on the occasion of the inquiry's seventh anniversary, Folha de S.Paulo published a report in which lawyers and law professors called for the immediate closure of the investigation, citing its excessive length, lack of transparency, and absence of a specific subject matter as factors undermining legal certainty and damaging the STF's image — the Court then being embroiled in questions over justices Moraes's and Toffoli's ties to Banco Master. The report also noted that, since the inquiry was opened, numerous other investigations had been assigned to Justice Moraes by prevention and without random distribution, and that the opacity of the investigation and its offshoots makes it difficult to assess to what extent the orders issued might be abusive — including search and seizure warrants against individuals investigated for an alleged leak of Federal Revenue Service data, the questioning of the president of Unafisco (the National Association of Federal Revenue Auditors) as a subject of investigation, and proceedings against a blogger from Maranhão assigned to Moraes on the basis of an alleged connection to the inquiry.

=== OAB request for closure ===
On 23 February 2026, the Brazilian Bar Association (OAB), in a letter to Chief Justice Edson Fachin, cited "extreme institutional concern regarding the persistence and legal framework of long-running investigations, particularly Inquiry No. 4,781" and its "perpetual nature."

The organization also argued that the investigation had continued for an excessive period, approaching seven years in duration; that the scope of the proceeding had broadened over time to incorporate new facts and subjects; that maintaining an inquiry of indefinite duration could compromise constitutional principles such as due process, the right to a full defense, and the adversarial principle; and that legal certainty requires the investigation to have a defined time frame and scope.

The OAB also requested a meeting with the presidency of the STF to discuss the matter, and argued that investigations of this nature should observe standards of exceptionality and reasonable duration.

== See also ==
- Lawfare
- 2022–2023 Brazilian coup plot
