= Censorship of Telegram =

The Telegram Messenger application has been blocked by multiple countries.

Map showing the countries that are either currently blocking or have blocked Telegram in the past Currently blocked or restricted (for example: slowing down) Formerly blocked or restricted

== Currently blocked ==
=== China ===
In July 2015, it was reported that China blocked access to Telegram Messenger. According to the state-owned People's Daily, Chinese human rights lawyers used Telegram to criticize the Chinese Government and the Chinese Communist Party. Despite the restrictions, the platform is used to access news channels that operate outside of local media control. For example, channels such as Dongnanya Dajijian (东南亚大事件) are utilized by the community to follow regional updates.

=== Cuba ===
In July 2021, the Cuban government blocked access to several social media platforms, including Telegram, to curb the spread of information during the anti-government protests.

=== Iran ===
Telegram was open and working in Iran without any VPN or other circumvention methods in May 2015. In August 2015, the Iranian Ministry of ICT asserted that Telegram had agreed to restrict some of its bots and sticker packs in Iran at the request of the Iranian government. According to an article published on Global Voices, these features were being used by Iranians to "share satirical comments about the Iranian government". The article also noted that "some users are concerned that Telegram's willingness to comply with Iranian government requests might mean future complicity with other Iranian government censorship, or even allow government access to Telegram's data on Iranian users". Telegram has stated that all Telegram chats are private territory and that they do not process any requests related to them. Only requests regarding public content (bots and sticker packs) will be processed. In May 2016, the Iranian government asked all messaging apps, including Telegram, to move all Iranian users' data to Iranian servers. On 20 April 2017, the Iranian government completely blocked Telegram's new voice calls, a service that allows individuals to make calls via secure, end-to-end encryption, and keep their conversations private. Mahmoud Vaezi, Chief of Staff of the President of Iran said reason for blocking Telegram free voice calls is so Iranian corporations keep revenue from voice calls.

On 30 December 2017, during anti-government demonstrations across Iran, Telegram has shut down a channel of the Iranian opposition that published calls to use Molotov cocktails against the police, after receiving a complaint from the Iranian government. Pavel Durov explained that the reason for the blocking was a "no calls to violence" policy and confirmed that criticizing local authorities, challenging the status quo and engaging in political debate were seen as "OK" by the platform, while "promoting violence" was not. The opposition group promised to comply with Telegram rules and created a new channel which amassed 700,000 subscribers in less than 24 hours. On 31 December, the Iranian government announced that Telegram has been "temporarily restricted" to "ensure calm and security" after the company said it refused to shut down peaceful protesting channels. On 13 January, the app was unblocked by an order of the president Hassan Rouhani, who said that "more than 100,000 jobs had been lost" in Iran as a result of the ban on Telegram. Channels of the opposition remain operational.

In March 2018, Iran's chairman for the Committee for Foreign Policy and National Security Alaeddin Boroujerdi announced that Telegram has been targeted to be fully blocked in Iran by 20 April 2018, citing Telegram's role in facilitating the winter protests and the need to promote local apps. President Rouhani agreed with the need to break Telegram's monopoly in Iran, but maintained that he was opposed to a new blockade and did not see it as an effective measure to promote local apps. Iranian MP Mahmoud Sadeghi noted that during the two weeks that Telegram was blocked in January 2018, 30 million Iranians (75% of Telegram's users in Iran) did not start using local messaging apps, but instead turned to VPN services to circumvent the block, rendering the blockade ineffective.

Telegram was blocked by the government on 1 May 2018.

For until one year from the end of the 2017 riots, the Iranian government made available a customized version of Telegram that was under their domain. In 2019, Tehran's Friday Prayer imam Mohammad-Ali Movahedi Kermani declared that Telegram is haram, and requested National Information Network deployment like the Great Firewall.

On 27 September 2019, Bijan Ghasemzadeh, the Iranian prosecutor who ordered the block on Telegram, was arrested for charges of corruption. It is unclear whether or not the charges were related to the ban on Telegram.

=== Iraq ===
On 6 August 2023, the Ministry of Communications in Iraq blocked Telegram due to leaked official state data and citizens' personal information on the platform.

On 13 August 2023, the ban was lifted after multiple offending channels were removed. The official statement from Iraq's MoC suggests that the app "responded to the requirements of the security authorities", while Telegram stated that "no private user data was requested from Telegram and that none has been shared".

On 16 November 2026, prime minister Ali al-Zaidi ordered the Iraqi Communications and Media Commission to block Telegram nationwide due to its inability to comply with Iraq's laws regarding extremism and hate speech.

=== Kenya ===
On 25 June 2025, Kenya's government, banned Telegram during the 2025 Kenyan protests.

=== Nepal ===
On 18 July 2025, Nepal's government, banned Telegram in regards to concerns about fraud and money laundering.

=== Pakistan ===
In October 2017, Telegram was inaccessible to users in Pakistan, and as of 18 November 2017, it has been completely blocked on PTCL as per instructions from PTA, Pakistan's largest ISP, PTCL mentioned this in a tweet to a user.

=== Russia ===
On 16 May 2017, Russian media reported that Roskomnadzor was threatening to ban Telegram. On 13 April 2018, Telegram was banned in Russia by a Moscow court, due to its refusal to grant the Federal Security Service (FSB) access to encryption keys needed to view user communications as required by federal anti-terrorism law. Enforcement of the ban was attempted by blocking over 19 million IP addresses associated with the service. However, they included those used by Amazon Web Services and Google Cloud Platform, due to Telegram's use of the providers to route messages. This led to unintended collateral damage due to usage of the platforms by other services in the country, including retail, Mastercard SecureCode, and Mail.ru's Tamtam messaging service. Users used VPNs to bypass the ban as a result. On 17 April 2018, Russian authorities asked Apple and Google to pull the service from their stores as well as APKMirror, however, Apple and Google refused the request. On 28 March 2018, Roskomnadzor reportedly sent a legally binding letter to Apple asking it to remove the app from the Russian version of its App Store and block it from sending push notifications to local users who have already downloaded the app. On 27 December 2018, the largest search engine in Russia, Yandex, removed telegram.org from their search results. On 18 June 2020, the Russian government lifted its ban on Telegram after it agreed to "help with extremism investigations".

On 8 March 2025, Russian authorities blocked access to Telegram in Dagestan and Chechnya due to the security concerns. The government lifted Telegram's ban in Dagestan on 28 May. One day later, however, Telegram's blockage was restored in Dagestan.

On 13 August 2025, Roskomnadzor blocked calls, video chats, and broadcasts. In October 2025, Beeline and T2 began experiencing problems with SMS code delivery. Testing of technical measures began in November 2025. On 10 February 2026, Roskomnadzor officially began slowing down Telegram. After Roblox was unblocked on 10 June 2026, Andrey Svintsov announced that Telegram would be unblocked following Roblox's.

=== Somalia ===
On 20 August 2023, the Somali government announced a ban on the messaging app Telegram, along with the video-sharing platform TikTok and the online betting website 1XBet. The ban, which was set to go into effect on 24 August, targeted internet service providers and threatened legal action if they did not comply. Jama Hassan Khalif, the Minister of Communications and Technology, justified the ban by claiming that these platforms were being used by "terrorists and immoral groups" to "spread constant horrific images and misinformation to the public". In the period leading up to the ban, explicit content, including sexual material, was widely posted in Telegram groups, causing concerns about online safety in Somalia, a conservative Muslim-majority country. These concerns were particularly strong regarding unsupervised youths. Moreover, this decision came shortly before the government planned to launch a second military offensive against al-Shabaab, an al-Qaeda-linked Islamist militant group that has been waging war against the Somali government for over 15 years. Al-Shabaab frequently uses TikTok and Telegram to post about their activities.

The ban was met with criticism from Somali citizens, particularly those who rely on those platforms for income. Many Somali users expressed concern that the ban would negatively impact their livelihoods. Some content creators argued that the government should have addressed their concerns by targeting individual users who violate platform guidelines instead of resorting to "collective punishment". Others highlighted that the platforms provided them with job opportunities and a source of income in a country facing high unemployment rates. There were also concerns that the ban would limit freedom of expression and access to information for Somali youth. Somali federal lawmaker and TikToker, Abdirahman Abdishakur, argued that the ban lacked due process and called for regulations and collaboration with social media companies instead of an outright ban. He emphasized the importance of these platforms for engaging with young people and understanding their perspectives on national issues.

=== Thailand ===
On 19 October 2020, the National Broadcasting and Telecommunications Commission was ordered to block Telegram due to its use in the 2020–2021 Thai protests.

=== Vietnam ===
On 21 May 2025, the Ministry of Science and Technology requested network operators to block Telegram's operations in Vietnam. According to the Ministry of Public Security, 68% of the 9,600 Telegram channels and groups in Vietnam have been deemed malicious. Telegram is mandated to supervise and eliminate illegal content when requested but has consistently neglected these duties. Under laws implemented on January 1, internet telecom operators are required to notify authorities of violations on their platforms. However, officials stated that Telegram disregarded multiple notices.

== Formerly blocked / restrictions ==
=== Azerbaijan ===
From 27 September 2020, following the start of the war in Karabakh, the Azerbaijani Ministry of Transport, Communications and High Technologies imposed temporary restrictions on the use of social media in the country. Telegram, Facebook, WhatsApp, YouTube, Instagram, TikTok, LinkedIn, Twitter(X), Zoom and Skype were completely blocked. Many other unrelated services were also blocked due to a lack of coordination. The restriction was lifted on 10 November 2020.

=== Bahrain ===
In June 2016, it was found that some ISPs in Bahrain had started to block Telegram.

=== Belarus ===
Telegram was a key platform for sharing information and coordinating rallies during the 2020–2021 Belarusian protests. Telegram was one of few communication platforms available in Belarus during the three days of internet shutdown that followed the day of the presidential election, which Belarus's president Alexander Lukashenko won amid widespread allegations of election fraud. On the evening of 11 August, while the Internet shutdown continued, 45 percent of people using Telegram protest chats in Belarus were online, despite the government's efforts to block online access. In October 2020, Apple asked Telegram to remove 3 channels that leaked the identities of the people involved in the Belarusian protests.

=== Brazil ===
In February 2022, the Superior Electoral Court announces that 3 Telegram channels, which are allegedly involved in fake news dissemination, had been regionally blocked by their request, under penalty of Telegram being suspended for 48 hours. This decision includes one of the channels of the far-right journalist Allan dos Santos, who had already had his website (Terça Livre) and YouTube channel deleted by a Supreme Federal Court decision. On 18 March, the Superior Electoral Court ordered the suspension of all access to the service, alleging that the platform had repeatedly ignored the court's decisions. Following the Superior Electoral Court's decision, Telegram's founder and CEO Pavel Durov claimed that the court was sending emails to an "old general-purpose email address" that Telegram hadn't been checking, and sought a reinvestigation of the decision. The ban was lifted two days later.

On 26 April 2023, Telegram was temporarily suspended throughout Brazil, and the company was fined R$1 million (2023) (US$178,794.92) daily for not complying with an investigation into neo-Nazi activities on the platform. The company only partially fulfilled a court request for personal data on two anti-Semitic Telegram groups, which authorities considered an intentional lack of cooperation. The decision was made after a series of violent school attacks, with at least one incident being linked to exchanges on an anti-Semitic group. A federal court lifted the suspension three days later, but upheld the daily fine.

=== Czech Republic ===
Some channels (for example, Russian news channels) are blocked in the Czech Republic.

=== France ===
In November 2023, Élisabeth Borne announced that messaging apps such as Signal, WhatsApp and Telegram would be banned for Government ministers and staff and they would have to transition to Olvid or Tchap, a government messenger built upon the Matrix protocol.

=== Germany ===
On 11 February 2022, the German government announced that 64 Telegram channels, which reportedly potentially violate German laws against hate speech, had been deleted by their request. This included the channel of Attila Hildmann, a self-described nationalist who shared antisemitic conspiracy theories via his channel. According to the press release, Telegram has agreed to cooperate with the German government and delete channels with potentially illegal content in the future. The Telegram channel of Russia Today (@rtnews) is blocked in Germany.

=== Hong Kong ===
During the 2019–2020 Hong Kong protests, many participants used Telegram to evade electronic surveillance and coordinate their action against the 2019 Hong Kong extradition bill. On the evening of 11 June 2019, the Hong Kong police arrested Ivan Ip, the administrator of a Telegram group with 20,000 members on suspicion of "conspiracy to commit public nuisance." He was forced by the police to hand over his Telegram history. The next day, Telegram suffered a "powerful" decentralized denial of service attack. Hackers tried to paralyze the target server by sending a large number of spam requests, most of which came from mainland China.

On 28 August 2019, the Hong Kong Internet Service Providers Association announced that the Hong Kong government had plans to block Telegram.

On 16 May 2022, Privacy Commissioner Ada Chung told a Legislative Council committee that the government remains concerned about doxxing and other violations of personal data privacy, and the Office of the Privacy Commissioner for Personal Data is looking at blocking Telegram to address the issue.

=== India ===
In 2019, it was reported that some internet service providers in India were blocking Telegram traffic, including its official website. Internet Freedom Foundation, an Indian digital liberties organisation filed an RTI on whether Department of Telecommunications (DoT) had banned Telegram or requested ISPs to block traffic. The response from DoT said that it had no information on why the ISPs were blocking Telegram. The High Court of Kerala asked about the central government's view on a plea for banning Telegram for allegedly disseminating child abuse videos and communicating through it. From June 16, 2026, to approximately June 22, 2026, authorities blocked Telegram. According to the authorities, this was due to fraudulent activity. In reality, it was due to leaking answers to the NEET 2026 medical exam.

=== Indonesia ===
On 14 July 2017, eleven domain name servers related to Telegram were banned by the Indonesian Communication and Information Ministry with the possibility of closing all Telegram applications in Indonesia if Telegram did not make a standard operating procedure to maintain content that was considered unlawful in the apps. In August 2017, Indonesian Government has opened full access of Telegram, after Telegram has made self censorship about negative contents mainly radicalism and terrorism. Telegram said that about 10 channels/groups have been deleted from Telegram everyday due to are categorized as negative contents.

=== Norway ===
On 23 March 2023, Norway's parliament, the Storting, officially banned Telegram for MPs on work devices that have access to its systems.

=== Philippines ===
In February 2026, the Philippine government proposed banning Telegram after authorities raised concerns over the platform's use in online sexual abuse and exploitation of children (OSAEC), illegal gambling, scams, and other cybercrimes. The proposal was announced by the Department of Information and Communications Technology (DICT) as part of a broader effort to strengthen online safety. The proposed ban was later withdrawn after the DICT reached an agreement with Telegram. The company committed to improving its cooperation with Philippine authorities, including establishing a 24/7 reporting channel and strengthening measures against illegal content. As a result, Telegram remained available in the Philippines.

=== Poland ===
Poland has blocked certain Telegram channels belonging to Russian news outlets since 2022. These were mostly the RT and Sputnik. Since 6 December 2024 nationwide Telegram blocking has been observed on certain Polish ISPs.

=== Spain ===
On 22 March 2024, Audiencia Nacional judge Santiago Pedraz issued the suspension of Telegram in the country as a "precautionary measure" after officials in the Virgin Islands reportedly failed to answer back a court request dating from July 2023. The rationale behind this decision was a request made by media companies including Atresmedia, EGEDA, Mediaset and Telefónica who argued that Telegram was being used to share copyrighted content. On 25 March 2024, Pedraz revoked his previous decision as it would turn out to be "excessive and not proportionate".

=== Ukraine ===
On 20 September 2024, National Security and Defence Council of Ukraine announced restrictions prohibiting the installation and use of Telegram on official devices used by government officials, military personnel, security and defence workers, and critical-infrastructure employees.

On 24 February 2026, the issue was again raised in the Verkhovna Rada, where MP Mykola Kniazhytskyi argued that Telegram was being used by Russian intelligence services for recruitment and called for restrictions on its use by government bodies and other institutions if the platform did not cooperate with Ukrainian authorities.
