= Carlos Washington Aliseris =

Uruguayan painter (1898–1974)

- Born: Carlos Washington Aliseris Genta; 19 January 1898; Montevideo, Uruguay
- Died: 1974 (aged 75–76); Montevideo, Uruguay
- Occupations: Painter, diplomat
- Known for: Painting

Carlos Washington Aliseris Genta (19 January 1898 – 25 April 1974) was a Uruguayan painter and diplomat.

== Early life and education ==
Aliseris was born in Montevideo. From 1924 to 1928, he studied at Escuela Industrial No. 1, where he attended modelling classes taught by Luis Falcini. Between 1927 and 1929, he studied painting at the Círculo Fomento de Bellas Artes with Domingo Bazzurro and Milo Beretta.

== Career ==
In 1928, he participated in a collective exhibition at Casa del Arte. In 1931, he was one of the founders of the Agrupación de Artistas Independientes del Uruguay, together with Antonio Pena, Gilberto Bellini and Melchor Méndez Magariños.

In 1934, he was appointed deputy director of the Museo Histórico Nacional of Uruguay. In 1936, he was appointed honorary attaché to the Uruguayan legation in Great Britain and Ireland.

During the 1930s, Aliseris travelled in Brazil, where he met Candido Portinari and Mário de Andrade. In 1937, he received a silver medal in the Uruguayan pavilion at the Paris International Exposition.

He exhibited in Montevideo, Buenos Aires, Rio de Janeiro, São Paulo, Washington, D.C., Tokyo, Antwerp, Brussels, London, Paris, Madrid, Barcelona and Lisbon.

An academic paper presented at the Associação Nacional de História discussed Aliseris in relation to correspondence involving Portinari and artistic exchanges between Uruguay and Brazil.

== Collections ==
Works by Aliseris are held in the collections of the Museo Nacional de Bellas Artes in Argentina and the Parliament of Uruguay.

He died in Montevideo in 1974.
