= Brasil Paralelo =

Brazilian media company

- Type: Private
- Industry: Media, documentary production, streaming
- Founded: 2016; 10 years ago
- Founders: Lucas Ferrugem; Henrique Viana; Felipe Valerim
- Headquarters: Porto Alegre, Rio Grande do Sul, Brazil
- Area served: Worldwide (via streaming)
- Products: Documentaries, feature films
- Services: BP Select
- Revenue: 29,900,000 Brazilian real (2020)
- Website: brasilparalelo.com.br

Brasil Paralelo, is a Brazilian media company founded in Porto Alegre and headquartered since 2020 in São Paulo. It produces documentaries offering alternative viewpoints on politics, history and current events. Its content is distributed primarily through its own subscription‑based streaming platform, BP Select, and its YouTube channel.

Founded in 2016 as an alternative to mainstream media, its name, which translates to "Parallel Brazil," reflects its stated mission to connect audiences with a reality it portrays as suppressed by mainstream journalists and intellectuals.

Brasil Paralelo's work has been associated with the Brazilian right in the past, although it shifted its focus to general programming in 2021. Some of its productions have faced criticism for presenting a different view of historical events. Brasil Paralelo considers its content apolitical and free of ideological bias.

== History ==
Brasil Paralelo was founded in Porto Alegre in 2016 by Lucas Ferrugem, Henrique Viana, and Felipe Valerim amid a growing conservative movement in Brazil, with Valerim citing the 2014 reelection of Dilma Rousseff as a catalyst for what he described as an "awakening of political conscience." The name "Brasil Paralelo" was chosen to reflect a mission of operating independently from the state, inspired by the concept that "two parallel lines never meet." The company's logo, a black hole, is a reference to the film Interstellar (2014) and symbolizes the idea of connecting with a "parallel reality" of information outside of what it describes as a left‑leaning mainstream intellectual and journalistic consensus in Brazil.

It initially gained prominence through free‑to‑watch documentaries; its first documentary series, Congresso Brasil Paralelo, which analyzed Brazil's political and economic landscape, was distributed for free, with associated content available for purchase. Its initial business model was centered on offering free documentaries and selling related supplementary material.

In April 2017, Brasil Paralelo participated in the 30th edition of the Freedom Forum. At this event, its representatives exhibited, at the Unconference show, the entity's work in producing content and as an independent media alternative.

In September 2019, Brasil Paralelo signed a contract with TV Escola, a state‑run channel linked to the Ministry of Education, for the free broadcast of its series Brasil, a Última Cruzada. The series began airing in December 2019, which later became controversial.

In 2021, Brasil Paralelo transitioned into a streaming subscription service, expanding its offerings to include licensed films, series, and cartoons from major studios, with Sony Pictures being an early partner. The platform provides curated content for a conservative audience, with each film accompanied by an introductory analysis to frame its relevance. Later in the same year, Panflix, the on‑demand content platform of Grupo Jovem Pan, began showing series and documentaries produced by Brasil Paralelo. A survey by the Aos Fatos agency in February of that year identified Brasil Paralelo's Telegram channel as the second‑largest in Brazil, with 80,000 subscribers.

Its subscriber base grew from 15,000 in December 2019 to over 112,100 by September 2020. By 2022, Brasil Paralelo had surpassed 500,000 subscribers on its platform. On 21 June 2022, the company released Entre Lobos, a documentary about urban violence, reporting that the production, which cost R$1 million, generated R$2.5 million in new subscriptions within four hours of its launch. For the full year, the company projected revenues exceeding R$100 million.

== BP Select ==
In 2021, Brasil Paralelo launched its streaming service, BP Select. It operates on a business model that incorporates elements of a "mediatech" approach, such as focusing on a specific niche audience and using technology to analyze user behavior for subscriber acquisition and retention. BP Select is considered the Netflix of Brazil.

The service's initial catalog included licensed Hollywood titles and its own productions. The library featured films from the 2010s, such as Captain Phillips (2013) and Whiplash (2014), alongside classic cinema titles including Lawrence of Arabia (1962), A Man for All Seasons (1966), Taxi Driver (1976), and Ghostbusters (1984). It also included original programming such as Contraponto, an interview program hosted by Bruno Magalhães focusing on social issues, and Conversa Paralela, a guest‑based talk show with hosts Arthur Morisson and Lara Brenner, which is described as having a format similar to American conservative podcasts. Other daily additions consist of Insight BP, a program centered on personal development; Red Pill, a podcast dedicated to cinema; and Rasta News, a comedic weekly news review hosted by João Nogueira.

Its urban‑violence film Entre Lobos, released on BP Select, generated R$2.5 million in new subscriptions in its first four hours online and was credited to BP’s “ambitious production values” and "data‑driven" productions.

== Funding ==
By early 2017, Brasil Paralelo had amassed over five thousand subscribers and, according to a report in O Estado de S. Paulo that was later disputed by the founders, had earned more than R$1.5 million in its first six months. Brasil Paralelo maintains that its revenue is generated from subscriptions for exclusive content and courses, having previously also monetized its free documentaries on YouTube.

Brasil Paralelo states that it is a non‑partisan entity funded entirely by subscriptions from its members, who receive access to exclusive content.

== Production ==
Brasil Paralelo produces documentary series focused on politics, history, and culture from a conservative perspective. Its inaugural series, Congresso Brasil Paralelo, featured video testimonials from Olavo de Carvalho, Jair Bolsonaro, Janaina Paschoal, and Luiz Felipe Pondé. This was followed by the eight‑episode series Brasil: A Última Cruzada (2017), which presented the nation's history with an epic narrative and dramatizations. The series was later cited in an academic study as a key vehicle for popularizing conservative interpretations of history in Brazil.

In 2019, Brasil Paralelo released a feature‑length documentary 1964: O Brasil entre Armas e Livros, which examines the 1964 Brazilian coup d'état, gained large online following. Released simultaneously in cinemas and on YouTube, it garnered nearly nine million views by 2021. It also became a major point of controversy. Its theatrical run was canceled by the Cinemark cinema chain following public protests that it relativized state repression and torture during the military dictatorship. Historian João Cezar de Castro Rocha commented that while the film "explicitly condemns torture," its premise also "favors the explanation of complex processes through conspiracy theories" and reinforces Jair Bolsonaro's political narrative.

Other productions include Teatro das Tesouras (2018), which examined Brazilian presidential elections after the military dictatorship, and Pátria Educadora, a trilogy that criticized the national education system and the work of influential educator Paulo Freire.

In 2020, Brasil Paralelo released Os Donos da Verdade (The Owners of Truth), defending former Education Minister Abraham Weintraub, and 7 denúncias: as consequências do caso COVID‑19 (7 Denunciations: The Consequences of the COVID‑19 Case), which was critical of social distancing measures. In the same year, it released A Sétima Arte, a five‑part series on the language of cinema that later became a popular title on its BP Select streaming service and led to classic‑film licensing deals. Two years later, Guerra do Imaginário (2022) explored the intersection of myth, faith, and literature through the works of authors like G. K. Chesterton, C. S. Lewis, and J. R. R. Tolkien, earning praise from the Correio Braziliense for its scholarly and artistic interviews. That same year, the investigative documentary Varig: A Caixa‑Preta do Brasil (2022) revived public discussion about the airline Varig's collapse and received positive review for its economic analysis. Also in 2022, Brasil Paralelo premiered another Teatro das Tesouras. The production analyzes what it characterizes as the theoretical political antagonism between the PT and the PSDB parties, focusing on the period of their political dominance which began in 1994 and saw them alternate in the presidency for six consecutive elections.

The 2023 trilogy A Direita no Brasil charted the rise of the modern conservative movement in the country from 2013 to 2022 and was noted by Folha de S.Paulo for its diverse range of interview subjects.

MST: Terra Prometida (2025) provided what the producers described as an unprecedented look at the Landless Workers' Movement. It was praised by Gazeta do Povo for its technical quality and the breadth of its sources.

Brasil Paralelo has also ventured into original fiction. Its first feature film, A Oficina do Diabo (The Devil's Workshop), an adaptation of C. S. Lewis's The Screwtape Letters, was directed by one of the company's founding partners, Filipe Valerim. Revista Oeste lauded the film for being “totally financed by its subscriber base” and for tackling spiritual themes rarely covered by Brazilian cinema.

== Reception ==
Brasil Paralelo has received both positive and negative reception to its work.

Its six‑part series, Brazil – A Última Cruzada (2017) was praised by Gazeta do Povo, columnist Erick Silva who called the series “aesthetically brilliant” and “the most important audiovisual work,” praising above all its recovery of overlooked figures such as José Bonifácio and Princess Isabel. Another Gazeta writer, philosopher Paulo Cruz, confessed that the fifth episode left him “in tears,” deeming the production “beautiful” and crediting it with “renewing our love for the fatherland” after surpassing 1.5 million viewers in its first months online. When a 4‑K remaster was launched for the 200th anniversary of Independence, Revista Oeste emphasised the “valorisation of Brazilian history and its remarkable personalities” and highlighted the addition of new animation sequences and upgraded cinematography.

Its 2019 documentary 1964: O Brasil entre Armas e Livros became a major point of controversy. Its theatrical run was canceled by the Cinemark cinema chain following public protests that it relativized state repression and torture during the military dictatorship. Writing in Gazeta do Povo, economist Rodrigo Constantino described the film as “serious and honest,” arguing that, once viewers attended the premières in ten cities and pushed the free YouTube cut to 4.4 million views in forty‑eight hours, “it became impossible to deny the work’s attachment to the facts.” Even amid the dispute with the Cinemark chain, Gazeta do Povo noted that company co‑founder Lucas Ferrugem defended the film’s “highest commitment to historical fact” and emphasized the breadth of bibliographic and interview material assembled to treat such a “sensitive period.” In a full review for the specialist site Cinema com Rapadura, critic João Victor Barros stressed that Brasil Paralelo’s productions are “undeniably well‑made and technically competent” and applauded the documentary for offering “at least a deeper look” at the military period than is usual in mainstream historiography. Historian João Cezar de Castro Rocha commented that while the film "explicitly condemns torture," its premise also "favors the explanation of complex processes through conspiracy theories" and reinforces Jair Bolsonaro's political narrative.

Environmental title Cortina de Fumaça in 2021 received a warm welcome from Revista Oeste, which highlighted what it called the documentary’s “impeccable production quality,” its 1.8 million YouTube views within months of release, and its counter‑argument that Brazilian agribusiness can be part of the global environmental solution.

When the three‑part true‑crime investigation Entre Lobos debuted in June 2022, Gazeta do Povo described the series as a rare attempt to “discover the causes of crime” rather than merely lament its consequences, praising the breadth of the 50 interviewees and the filmmakers’ confidence that “there is a way out” of endemic violence. Columnist Francisco Escorsim went further, recommending the documentary for “laying bare” the reality of organised crime and arguing that its data make continued complacency “impossible”.

Early in 2024 Gazeta do Povo attended a press screening of História do Comunismo and judged the six‑episode series “the best product the streaming service has delivered to date.” The review highlighted a reported R$ 1 million self‑financed budget, Netflix‑level digital re‑enactments and a choice of interviewees ranging from Simon Sebag Montefiore to Anthony Saich, concluding that the result finally offered Brazilian viewers a “coherent history” of an ideology that earlier documentaries had treated only in partisan fashion. Six months later, its 2024 two‑part documentary on universities Unitopia was described by Gazeta do Povo as “the principal Brazilian audiovisual work to tackle the current academic crisis,” praising its depth of sources and arguing that it “should serve as a reference for future debates”. October 2024 brought From the River to the Sea, which Gazeta do Povo called “one of the most comprehensive” Brazilian treatments of the Gaza war.

Its work has come under criticism from some historians and academics who accuse it of promoting historical negationism, conspiracy theories, and anti‑intellectual positions. Critics have associated it with figures such as Olavo de Carvalho and Bolsonaro. During the 2018 Brazilian presidential election, fact‑checking initiatives from Estadão and O Globo identified Brasil Paralelo for disseminating false claims about electoral fraud. The Superior Electoral Court (TSE) rejected one video’s assertion of a 73.14 % fraud probability, while another widely viewed video incorrectly applied Benford's law to allege irregularities in the 2014 election. A Brasil Paralelo series aired on state‑run TV Escola drew formal criticism from academics at the University of São Paulo (USP) and the São Paulo chapter of the National History Association (ANPUH‑SP), who labeled it "ideological propaganda" containing inaccurate historical portrayals. Other publications, such as Le Monde diplomatique Brasil, classified it as far‑right on the political spectrum.

Under the Bolsonaro administration, Brasil Paralelo was associated with Bolsonarism, though its founders emphasized that its establishment predates Jair Bolsonaro's political rise. Bolsonaro’s son, Eduardo Bolsonaro, actively promoted Brasil Paralelo content on social media. Agência Pública described it as part of a pro‑Bolsonaro alternative media ecosystem, and filmmaker Eduardo Escorel termed one production "didactic political propaganda." Amid the COVID‑19 pandemic, Brasil Paralelo released content aligning with government narratives criticizing social distancing measures, prompting Folha de S.Paulo to label it part of the president's "digital shock troop." O Estado de S. Paulo later nicknamed it the "Netflix of Bolsonaristas." Brasil Paralelo denies these criticisms, stating it criticizes all political sides and features diverse perspectives, including interviews with left‑wing figures. Co‑founder Lucas Ferrugem explicitly denies official ties to Bolsonaro's government but admits personal agreement with some policies. In 2019, it won a right of reply in a lawsuit against the newspaper O Globo.

Following the change of administration in Brazil, Brasil Paralelo distanced itself from Bolsonarism and repositioned itself as a general‑interest media platform. In its 2023 trilogy A Direita no Brasil analyzed the rise of the Brazilian right and “did not spare criticism” of former president Bolsonaro. Folha de S.Paulo noted the series was technically well‑produced and viewed this willingness to critique an erstwhile ally as a sign of the company’s editorial independence.

With Oficina do Diabo (January 2025) Brasil Paralelo moved into fiction and again found allies. Revista Oeste welcomed the release for prompting viewers to “reflect on the invisible snares the devil sets to draw people from the Christian faith,” while a culture‑page report in Gazeta do Povo said the story’s moral questions showed “the company may have a future in drama as long as it plays its cards right”.

== See also ==
- Conservative wave
- Terça Livre
