= Silas Malafaia =

Brazilian author and televangelist (born 1958)

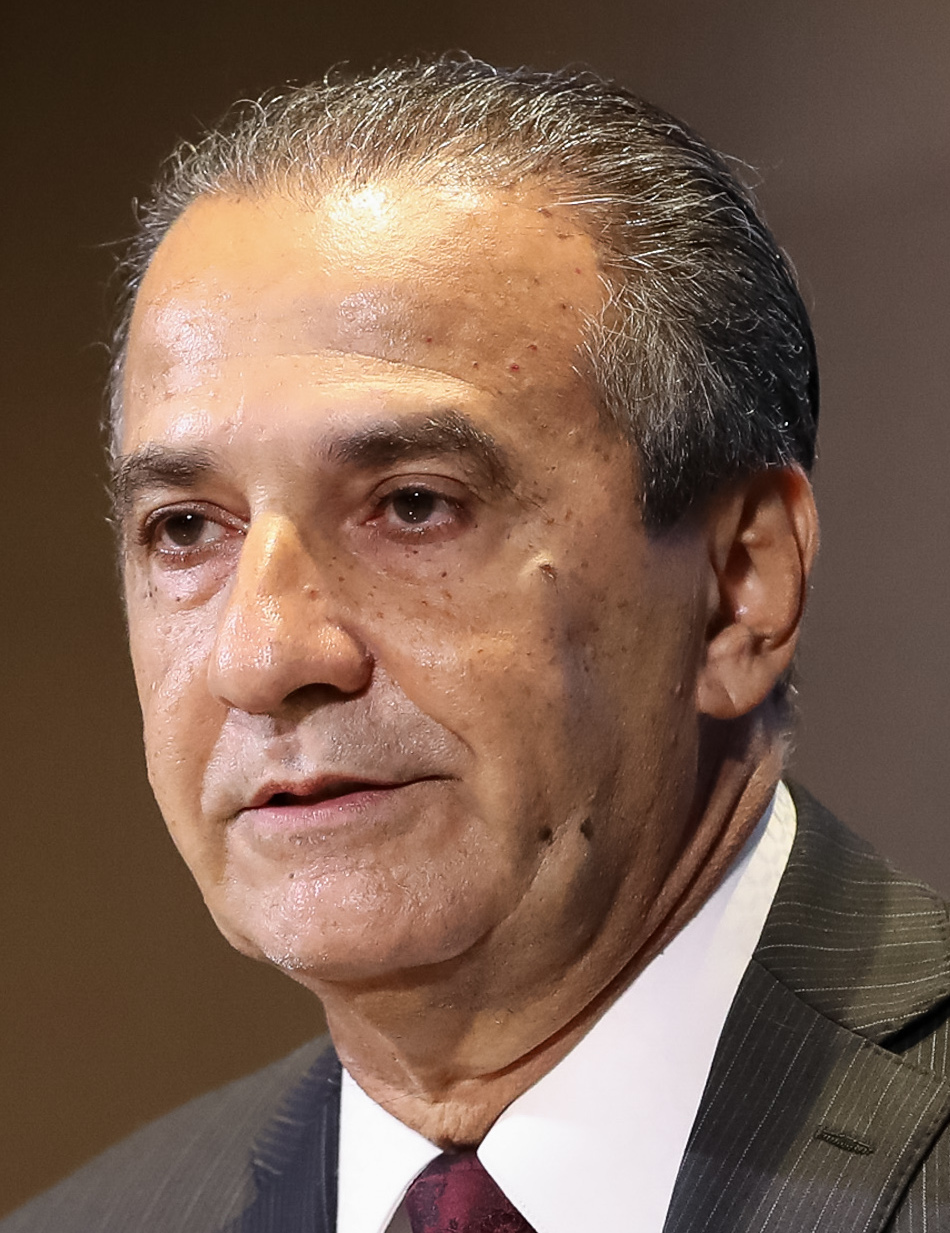
- Silas Malafaia in 2019
- Born: 14 September 1958 (age 67); Rio de Janeiro, Brazil
- Occupations: Pastor, author and televangelist
- Spouse: Elizete Malafaia

Silas Lima Malafaia (born 14 September 1958) is a Brazilian Pentecostal pastor, author and televangelist, who also has a degree in psychology. He is the leader of the Pentecostal church Assembleia de Deus Vitória em Cristo (Assembly of God Victory in Christ), a branch of the broader Assembleias de Deus movement of Pentecostal churches in Brazil. He is also the CEO of the Central Gospel Music publishing company, and vice president of the Interdenominational Council of Evangelical Ministers of Brazil (CIMEB), which is made up of approximately 8.500 ministers and leaders from almost all Brazilian evangelical denominations.

Malafaia was born in Rio de Janeiro. He is well known for his political work and strong opposition to the promotion of homosexuality in society and abortion, as well as for defending the Prosperity theology.

According to a 2013 Forbes magazine publication, Malafaia's total net worth is estimated at US$150 million. However, he denied the information in the talkshow De Frente com Gabi, in which he affirmed that his wealth revolved around R$6 million (approximately US$1.6 million).

Viewed as a staunch conservative, Malafaia is a polarizing and controversial figure in Brazil. He is often accused of fomenting hate speech, being known for his strong opposition to same-sex marriage and abortion. His critics accuse him of being a bigot and a homophobe, which he denies.

== Personal life ==
Malafaia was born in Rio de Janeiro, Brazil, into a family with origins in the state of Bahia. He converted to Pentecostalism at the age of 15 and later joined the Assembleias de Deus (Assemblies of God), one of Brazil's largest Protestant denominations.

He studied theology at the Seminário Teológico do Rio de Janeiro and later earned a degree in psychology. His background in psychology has influenced his approach to preaching, often incorporating behavioral and motivational elements into his sermons.

Malafaia is married to Elizete Malafaia, and they have two children. He resides in Rio de Janeiro, where he continues to lead his ministry.

== Career ==
=== Evangelical leader ===
Malafaia became a prominent figure in Brazilian evangelicalism through his dynamic preaching style and media outreach. He served as a pastor in the Assembleias de Deus before founding his own branch, Assembleia de Deus Vitória em Cristo (Assembly of God Victory in Christ), in 1993. He gained national recognition through his television program, Vitória em Cristo, broadcast on Record TV and other networks.

His influence has made him a key figure in the growing political power of Brazil's evangelical bloc. Malafaia stands out among religious leaders who use media platforms - especially social networks. He is the most popular “digital pastor” in Brazil, with 4.1 million followers on Instagram in 2024 - more than almost any politician in the country at that time.

He is a vocal critic of secularism, communism, and progressive social policies, often framing political debates in religious terms. Malafaia's sermons and debates also frequently address topics such as prosperity theology, family values, and opposition to abortion and LGBTQ+ rights. His statements on homosexuality, feminism, and other social issues have drawn criticism from human rights groups and progressive activists. He has been accused of promoting hate speech, though he maintains that his views are based on biblical teachings.

=== Political activism ===
Malafaia is an active participant in Brazilian politics, aligning himself with conservative and right-wing movements. In the 2002 Brazilian presidential election, he supported Luis Inácio Lula da Silva's candidacy, with whom he maintained an alliance until 2010, when the evangelical leader broke with him and the Workers' Party (PT) to support José Serra, of the Brazilian Social Democracy Party (PSDB), in the 2010 presidential campaign. In the first round of the 2014 presidential election, Malafaia initially supported Marina Silva, of the Brazilian Socialist Party (PSB) and an avowedly evangelical politician, against the then incumbent Dilma Rousseuf (PT), but later joined the campaign of Aécio Neves, the PSDB candidate who was defeated in the second round.

In 2018, Malafaia definitively broke with the PSDB. His new presidential candidate in those elections, this time for the Social Liberal Party, was Jair Bolsonaro, then a federal deputy of little political relevance on the Brazilian political scene and an assiduous supporter of ultraconservative agendas. The alliance between the pastor and the right-wing extremist politician proved to be much more stable, with their agendas constantly aligned and demonstrations of mutual, often unconditional, support. Two days after being elected president, Bolsonaro went to Malafaia's church, where the politician was greeted with a chorus of “Myth!”. Before handing him the microphone, Malafaia paraphrased a passage from Corinthians as an analogy to Bolsonaro's electoral victory: “God chose the foolish things to shame the wise … God chose the lowly things, those of little value, the despised, the discarded, those that are nothing … to shame the things that are – so that no flesh may boast before Him. That’s why God chose you!”.

Bolsonaro's government (2019–2022) marked the peak of the Malafaia's political authority. Senator Flávio Bolsonaro (one of Jair's sons) publicly stated that the evangelical leader was one of the president's main advisors. During the COVID-19 inquiry in the Brazilian National Congress, Malafaia was even included on the list of requests for indictment in the CPI report, due to suspicions that the religious leader was part of the Hate cabinet. The preacher was also instrumental in nominating André Mendonça for the position of minister of the Supreme Federal Court in 2021, a personal recommendation of the pastor because of his “terribly evangelical” faith. For the 2022 election, Malafaia again endorsed Bolsonaro – who, however, was defeated by Lula. About a month later after the election, the evangelical leader released a video advocating that President Bolsonaro call out the Brazilian Armed Forces against what he considers to be “institutional disorder” coming from the “dictator” Alexandre de Moraes, minister of the Federal Supreme Court, who in the pastor's view has struck a blow against freedom of expression and the right to demonstrate. For Malafaia, the military could not decide on “military intervention” on its own without the consent of Bolsonaro, who should have ordered it.

== List of publications ==
- A Abundância de Deus em Nossa Vida (in Portuguese). ISBN 85-7689-042-9.
- Ânimo: O Agente Ativador do Ser (in Portuguese). ISBN 978-85-7689-066-9.
- Aprendendo com uma Mulher Extraordinária (in Portuguese). ISBN 978-85-7689-113-0.
- Aprendendo Para Crescer (in Portuguese). ISBN 978-85-7689-074-4.
- Atraindo a Atenção de Deus (in Portuguese). ISBN 978-85-7689-170-3.
- Autoridade Espiritual (in Portuguese). ISBN 978-85-7689-073-7.
- Bons Pais, Filhos Melhores (in Portuguese). ISBN 85-89811-11-5.
- Como Ser Abençoado (in Portuguese). ISBN 978-85-7689-144-4.
- Crescimento Ideal da Vida Cristã (in Portuguese). ISBN 978-85-7689-110-9.
- Criação X Evolução: Quem está com a razão? (in Portuguese). ISBN 85-89811-73-5.
- Cristãos Equivocados (in Portuguese). ISBN 978-85-7689-253-3.
- Deus que Supre Todas as Nossas Necessidades, O (in Portuguese). ISBN 978-85-7689-163-5.
- Dois caminhos e uma escolha (in Portuguese). ISBN 85-89811-04-2.
- Enfrentando Problemas e Seguindo em Frente (in Portuguese). ISBN 978-85-7689-112-3.
- Esperando em Deus (in Portuguese). ISBN 85-7689-006-2.
- Extraordinária Presença de Jesus, A (in Portuguese). ISBN 978-85-7689-077-5.
- Felicidade ou Sofrimento: Qual a Sua escolha? (in Portuguese). ISBN 978-85-7689-076-8.
- Importância de Ser Cheio do Espírito Santo, A (in Portuguese). ISBN 978-85-7689-108-6.
- Inteligência Espiritual (in Portuguese). ISBN 978-85-7689-138-3.
- Leitura Diária – Silas Malafaia (in Portuguese). ISBN 978-85-7689-219-9.
- Lições de Vencedor (in Portuguese). Thomas Nelson Brasil. ISBN 978-85-7860-025-9.
- Limites do Sofrimento (in Portuguese). ISBN 978-85-7689-166-6.
- Maravilhosa Graça de Deus, A (in Portuguese). ISBN 978-85-7689-145-1.
- Minhas Experiências de Vida – Silas Malafaia (in Portuguese). ISBN 978-85-7689-274-8.
- Mordomia Cristã (in Portuguese). ISBN 85-89811-42-5.
- Na direção de Deus (in Portuguese). ISBN 85-89811-45-X.
- O Cristão e a Sexualidade (in Portuguese). ISBN 978-85-8981-118-7.
- O Deus de todos os momentos (in Portuguese). ISBN 85-89811-10-7.
- O Que É o Ser Humano? (in Portuguese). ISBN 978-85-7689-115-4.
- O Que Fazer Quando Não Existem Mais Saídas? (in Portuguese). ISBN 85-7689-013-5.
- O significado de um viver santo (in Portuguese). ISBN 85-89811-41-7.
- Orar pode mudar tudo (in Portuguese). ISBN 85-89811-40-9.
- Os Insondáveis Propósitos de Deus (in Portuguese). ISBN 978-85-7689-123-9.
- Palavra de Vitoria (in Portuguese). ISBN 978-85-7689-099-7.
- Palavra de Vitoria 2 (in Portuguese). ISBN 978-85-7689-099-7.
- Porque o Justo Sofre e o Ímpio Prospera (in Portuguese). ISBN 85-7689-004-6.
- Pr- Silas Responde (in Portuguese). ISBN 978-85-7689-197-0.
- Pregando Poderosamente a Palavra de Deus' (in Portuguese). ISBN 85-89811-91-3.
- Pregando Poderosamente a Palavra de Deus 2 (in Portuguese). ISBN 978-85-7689-232-8.
- Presença de Deus: Causas e Efeitos (in Portuguese). ISBN 978-85-7689-109-3.
- Quatro segredos da vida de Jesus (in Portuguese). ISBN 85-89811-01-8.
- Tempo: Um Fator Fundamental para a Vida (in Portuguese). ISBN 85-7689-037-2.
- Transformando as Adversidades em Bênçãos (in Portuguese). ISBN 978-85-7689-134-5.
- Vencendo as Tempestades da Vida (in Portuguese). ISBN 85-89811-06-9.
- Vencendo as tentações (in Portuguese). ISBN 85-89811-21-2.
- Vínculos do Amor (in Portuguese). ISBN 978-85-7689-182-6.
- Você Precisa Ser Determinado (in Portuguese). ISBN 978-85-7689-116-1.

== See also ==
- Apocalypse in the Tropics, a 2024 documentary film featuring Malafaia
