= Erotic baby bottle hoax =

Brazilian fake news story

A fake news story circulated during the period leading up to the 2018 Brazilian presidential election alleged that the Workers' Party (PT) and its presidential candidate, Fernando Haddad, enabled the distribution of baby bottles with penis-shaped teats in daycare centres across the country. It further alleged Haddad was planning to make the measure mandatory nationwide after his election. Such was its alleged effect on the election result that the Brazilian Parliament launched an inquiry into it and other instances of fake news spread via social media during the election campaign.

== Origin ==
The fake story originated from a post on Facebook. In a video dated August 25, 2018, a person presents a baby bottle with a teat shaped like a human penis and alleges it had been distributed by the Workers' Party throughout daycare centers in Brazil with the supposed aim of combatting homophobia. The video went viral, receiving almost 3 million views in the first 48 hours. On 27 September 2018 the candidate's campaign website published a note in which it denied any such distribution of the bottles.

On October 4, the Superior Electoral Court ordered the post to be removed and for Facebook to provide information about its author within 48 hours. Despite the denial and court ruling, the rumor continued to circulate with different images of baby bottles being used. The false stories and images were distributed en masse via WhatsApp to phone numbers across the country.

Former Bolsonaro ally and then sitting Congresswoman Joice Hasselmann said during her testimony to the parliamentary investigative committee on fake news that these messages had been coordinated by the so-called Hate cabinet, an informal group coordinated by the sons of then-candidate Jair Bolsonaro. According to Hasselmann, the group was responsible for hiring and managing thousands of bots and fake social media profiles.

Leading Brazilian newspaper Folha de São Paulo ran a front page exclusive claiming that Bolsonaro had been getting illegal help from an organised group of Brazilian entrepreneurs who bankrolled a campaign to bombard Brazilian WhatsApp users with fake news about Haddad. Bolsonaro responded by telling right-wing website O Antagonista: "I can't control it if an entrepreneur who is friendly to me is doing this. I know it's against the law. But I can't control it, I have no way of knowing about it and taking measures [to stop it]."

== Effect on election results ==
Although there are no studies detailing the effect fake news stories such as the baby bottle hoax had on the 2018 Brazilian general election, it is one of the stories often cited as having been one of the factors leading to Bolsonaro's election as president of Brazil that year. Brazilian actor Wagner Moura stated that "the erotic baby bottle won the elections in Brazil." Fake articles, claims and images which circulated on WhatsApp during this election were, at the time, described as responsible for "shaping the elections".

The hoax inspired some international commentary. An op-ed in the Portuguese newspaper Dinheiro Vivo argued that the belief in this type of news in Brazilian society is associated with other false beliefs, such as the discounted claim that the country's electronic voting machines are compromised. Ciara Long, writing for the U.S. Slate publication, stated that the fake news phenomenon has haunted Brazilian elections for years, but that the situation worsened in 2018. French newspaper Le Monde reported that the elections were blighted by fake news, pointing out that in addition to the baby bottle story, the same source attributed to the Workers' Party candidate a project which claimed that children should be handed over, at the age of 5, to the state, which would decide their sex.

== Parliamentary inquiry ==
The bulk messaging via WhatsApp was the subject of investigation by the Fake News CPI. Established in 2019, its remit was to investigate the distribution of fake news via social media during the 2018 campaign. It ended without reaching any definitive conclusion on its origin and financing.

The erotic baby bottle affair was mentioned throughout the hearings. Sérgio Lüdtke, representing fact-checking portal Projeto Comprova, told the commission that on trips to Spain he was frequently asked about the biberón de pene. The committee's work was halted in early 2020 due to the COVID-19 pandemic. It remains without conclusion and is unlikely to resume.

== See also ==
- Fake news
- Moral panic
