= Hate cabinet =

Virtual militia at the service of Brazilian ex-president Jair Bolsonaro

Hate cabinet (in Portuguese: Gabinete do Ódio) is the moniker attributed to a group of advisors to Brazilian ex-president Jair Bolsonaro which operated within the Palácio do Planalto, the country's executive branch headquarters, during Bolsonaro's term. They were coordinated by the former president himself and by his son, Carlos Bolsonaro. The group managed the former president's social media activities. It was established during the campaign for the 2018 Brazilian Presidential Election and remained active at least until the end of his term in 2022.

== Formation ==
The existence of a "virtual militia" which controlled fake profiles on social media platforms and disseminated fake news targeted at attacking adversaries was first revealed in mid-2019 by Congresswoman Joice Hasselmann, a former ally of Jair Bolsonaro. According to the congresswoman, the group was responsible for widely disseminating false news. Among other topics, they spread rumors about an alleged "gay kit" and a "phallic baby bottle", associating them with the presidential candidate Fernando Haddad during the 2018 election. This same group was reportedly responsible, months earlier, for spreading false information defaming Rio de Janeiro's City Councillor Marielle Franco, who was murdered in March 2018. They falsely claimed that the councilwoman was married to a drug trafficker and was a supporter of the criminal organization Comando Vermelho.

The activities of a "hate cabinet", denominated as such, were initially reported by the newspaper O Estado de S. Paulo in September 2019, and gained prominence from the mixed Parliamentary Inquiry Commission (CPMI) that investigated fake news in political contexts. Former Bolsonaro allies, including Joice Hasselmann, Alexandre Frota, and Heitor Freire, testified to the existence of the group that self-identifies as "Hate Cabinet". and described their methods. The primary allegations suggest that the group uses social media and mass messaging tools, especially through WhatsApp. According to a report from the Federal Police, this is "a group that produces content and/or promotes posts on social media targeting individuals (the so-called 'targets") — the 'straw men' pre-selected by the organization members – and disseminates them through multiple communication channels."

The content disseminated includes the propagation of fake news, the use of bots, and significant investments in promoting the generated content. There are suspicions that at least some of the funds used for disseminating this news come from public sources.

In addition to former government allies, the existence of the office is indicated by the Federal Police and by justices of the Supreme Federal Court of Brazil, but Bolsonaro himself has denied its existence.

== Operation ==
The name, chosen by the group itself, derives from its primary mode of operation, which involves producing and disseminating content attacking individuals and institutions perceived as critical of the government.

=== Methods ===
According to a report prepared by the Federal Police, the group follows a well-established process that consists of four stages:

- 1. Selection: During this phase, the individual or institution to be targeted is chosen.
- 2. Preparation: In this phase, offensive content is produced, and tasks are distributed within the group.
- 3. Attack: This involves publishing on social media platforms and mass messaging via messaging apps.
- 4. Amplification: During this stage, the content is retransmitted and promoted on various platforms, including by "public authorities and/or traditional media outlets."

The amplification of the content, as testified during the Parliamentary Commission of Inquiry into Fake News, is propelled by the use of bots. In addition to the direct presidential advisors, Congressman Alexandre Frota alleges that content replication was boosted with the involvement of the website "Terça Livre," coordinated by blogger Allan dos Santos. Based on disclosed messages, Allan was involved in the process of disseminating fake news funded by businessman Luciano Hang, following mediation by Senator Flávio Bolsonaro, another of Bolsonaro's sons. The blogger was convicted by the Supreme Federal Court of Brazil for disseminating defamatory content and is currently a fugitive in the United States.

=== DarkMatter ===
In November 2021, members of the office who traveled to Dubai as part of the presidential delegation to attend the Dubai AirShow met with representatives of DarkMatter, a spy tool developed to infiltrate computers and mobile devices of targets, even when they are turned off. The primary objective of this acquisition was its use to manipulate the 2022 presidential election.

== Spread of fake news related to the COVID-19 pandemic ==
The COVID-19 Parliamentary Inquiry, conducted by the Federal Senate during the COVID-19 pandemic, identified 15 individuals, including President Bolsonaro himself, as being associated with the Hate Cabinet. The Parliamentary Inquiry concluded that the Hate Cabinet was used to downplay the risks of the health emergency, contradict guidelines from the World Health Organization, and promote treatments without scientific evidence, such as hydroxychloroquine and other early treatments for COVID-19. The dissemination of fake news during the pandemic is cited as one of the factors contributing to the high number of deaths in Brazil.

During his testimony at the Parliamentary Commission of Inquiry, businessman Luciano Hang denied involvement with the Hate Cabinet. However, he acknowledged contributing to the dissemination of content advocating for the use of chloroquine to treat COVID-19, which was one of the main agendas of the Hate Cabinet during the COVID-19 pandemic.

== See also ==
- Allan dos Santos
- COVID-19 CPI
- Fake news
