= Rádio AuriVerde =

Rádio AuriVerde (ZYW 753)
- Bauru, São Paulo; Brazil
- Frequency: 97.5 MHz

Programming
- Language: Portuguese
- Affiliations: Jovem Pan News (2017–2023)

Ownership
- Owner: Daré family; (Radio Auri Verde de Bauru Ltda)

History
- First air date: September 7, 1956
- Former frequencies: 760 kHz

Technical information
- Licensing authority: ANATEL
- ERP: 15.988 kW
- Transmitter coordinates: 22°21′42.52″S 49°05′54.49″W

Links
- Public license information: Profile
- Webcast: Live radio
- Website: auriverdebrasil.com.br

Rádio AuriVerde (lit. 'Green and Gold Radio') is a Brazilian radio station based in Bauru, São Paulo. Founded on September 7, 1956, and affiliated with Jovem Pan from 2017 to 2023, the radio station is known for being the mouthpiece of bolsonarism, and its slogan is "the voice of the right in Brazil". His YouTube channel has over 2.3 million subscribers.

== History ==
Rádio AuriVerde began broadcasting on September 7, 1956, on 760 AM, becoming Bauru's second radio station after Bauru Rádio Clube (founded in 1934). It was a key station in the Central-West region of São Paulo, operating with just 15 employees and focusing on community service and sports programming.

In 1987, its second owner, advertiser Afonso Vianna, died in a car crash. Over the years, the station featured popular shows like Super Manhã Colorida (hosted by João Costa) and notable broadcasters such as Jorge Bongiovanni and Zezinho Trinta.

Facing financial struggles, the station applied for an AM-to-FM migration in 2014. By 2017, it could no longer sustain operations and laid off all staff. Later that year, under new director Alexandre Pittoli, it affiliated with Jovem Pan News, adopting a right-wing editorial stance. The FM transition was completed in 2018 (97.5 MHz).

The station became controversial for spreading far-right content, including offensive remarks by Pittoli against Bauru's mayor and an interview with senator Mara Gabrilli falsely linking Lula da Silva to the murder of Celso Daniel. The Superior Electoral Court (TSE) ordered the removal of the interview and mandated a right-of-reply for Lula, citing disinformation.

In 2023, its YouTube channel was demonetized, forcing it to rely on listener donations. By October 2023, Jovem Pan ended the affiliation due to editorial disagreements, shutting down Jovem Pan News Bauru.

== See also ==
- Gazeta do Povo
- Terça Livre

== Bibliography ==
- Rodrigues, Kelly De Conti (2013). "Rádio Auri Verde: Ondas de uma história". Revista Alterjor.
