= Gil Diniz =

Brazilian postman and politician

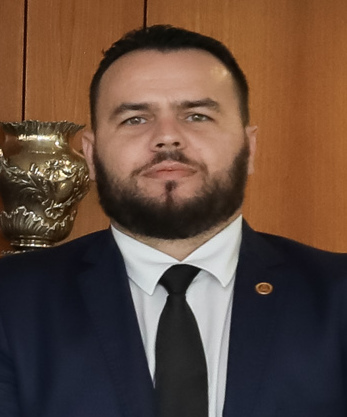

Member-elect of the Chamber of Deputies
- Assuming office 1 February 2027
- Constituency: São Paulo

Member of the Legislative Assembly of São Paulo
- Incumbent
- Assumed office 15 March 2019
- Constituency: At-large

Personal details
- Born: Gildevanio Ilso dos Santos Diniz; August 29, 1986 (age 40) Serra Talhada, Pernambuco, Brazil
- Party: PL (2022–present)
- Other political affiliations: PSC (2015–2018); PSL (2018–2020); Independent (2020–2022)
- Profession: Postman

Gildevanio Ilso dos Santos Diniz (August 29, 1986), better known as Gil Diniz or Carteiro Reaça, is a Brazilian postman and politician. He has been a member of the Social Liberal Party since 2018, until he was expelled in 2020 for allegedly spreading fake news and attacks on democratic institutions, such as the STF.

== Biography ==
He was born in Serra Talhada, in the interior of Pernambuco in 1986. Diniz started the History course with a full scholarship through the state program Prouni, but did not complete it. Between 2009 and 2011, he tried to join the Military Police of São Paulo State, but failed to pass the psychotechnical exam.

Diniz joined the Brazilian Post and Telegraph Company, where he became known in his unit for being critical of the company's union and the Workers' Party. There he received the nickname "Carteiro (Postman) Reaça".

During the 2014 elections, he met Eduardo Bolsonaro of whom he became a friend and started helping with the leaflets of Eduardo's campaign for deputy. After Eduardo's election, Gil became Eduardo's office advisor, a position he held until August 2018, with an average salary of 5,000 reais a month.

In the 2018 elections, he was elected state representative by São Paulo, with an expressive vote of 214,037 votes.

=== Personal life ===
Diniz has two children. He is Roman Catholic.

== Controversy ==
According to the survey of Aos Fatos in May 2020, Gil Diniz and a group of seven deputies investigated in the fake news survey published an average of two posts per day on a social network over a period of three months, with misinformation or mentioning the STF critical.

In July 2020, he and state representative Douglas Garcia were expelled from the Social Liberal Party for spreading fake news and attacking democratic institutions. The expulsion was formalized in October 2020 by Legislative Assembly of São Paulo. Between that period and February 2022, he was without a party, until he joined the ranks of the Liberal Party (PL) in the same year.

In the 2022 elections, he was re-elected as a state representative for São Paulo, with 196,215 votes.

=== Electoral performance ===
Electoral performance of Gil Diniz
Year	Office	Votes	Result	Ref.
2018	State representative of SP	214,037	Elected	
2022	State representative of SP	196.215	Elected	
