= Heitor Freire =

Brazilian politician (born 1981)

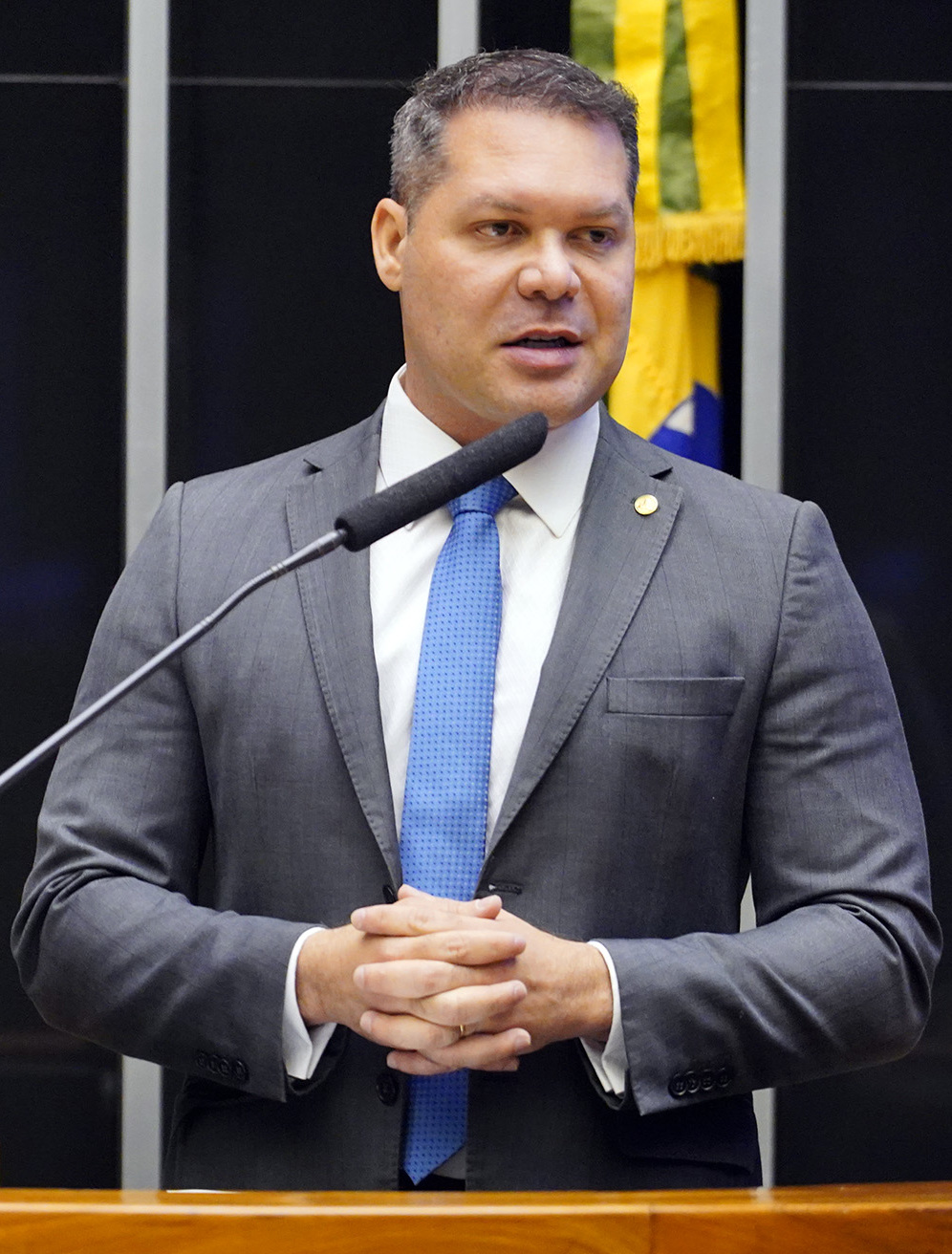
- Freire in 2021

Member of the Chamber of Deputies
- In office 1 February 2019 – 31 January 2023
- Constituency: Ceará

Personal details
- Born: 8 October 1981 (age 44)
- Party: Brazil Union (since 2022)
- Other political affiliations: Social Christian Party (2016–2018); Social Liberal Party (2018–2022)

Heitor Rodrigo Pereira Freire (born 8 October 1981) is a Brazilian politician. From 2019 to 2023, he was a member of the Chamber of Deputies. From 2018 to 2021, he served as president of the Social Liberal Party in Ceará.
