= Milo Beretta =

- Born: December 29, 1875; Montevideo, Uruguay
- Died: December 27, 1935 (aged 59); Montevideo, Uruguay
- Education: Studied painting with Miguel Pallejá; music with Camilo Giucci; continued art studies in Paris
- Known for: Painting
- Notable work: Las lavanderas en el Paraguay, Muelle viejo, Paisaje (bosque)
- Movement: Impressionism; Early Uruguayan Modernism

Milo Beretta (Montevideo, 29 December 1875 – 27 December 1935) was a Uruguayan painter, collector and cultural promoter associated with the early modernist currents in Uruguay.

== Early life and education ==
Beretta was born in Montevideo on 29 December 1875. He initially studied painting with Miguel Pallejá and music with Camilo Giucci. In 1888 he travelled to Europe to continue musical studies with Professor Marmontel (Paris). While in Paris he shifted his focus from music to the visual arts, becoming influenced by the sculptor Medardo Rosso (1858-1928), whom Beretta regarded as both mentor and friend.

== Career and artistic activity ==
On his return to Montevideo in 1898, Beretta established a studio in the Prado neighbourhood (calle Lugano). In this atelier he displayed works by Rosso (bronzes and ceramics) and paintings by Édouard Vuillard and Pierre Bonnard, as well as Van Gogh’s La diligencia a Tarascón, forming one of Uruguay’s most daring early collections of modern European art. His studio became a cultural salon, a gathering place for artists and intellectuals in early 20th-century Montevideo.

Beretta participated in international exhibitions including the Argentine Centennial Exhibition (Buenos Aires, 1910); the Panama-Pacific International Exposition (San Francisco, 1915); Rio de Janeiro (1922); and Santiago de Chile (1925). In 1930 he held a retrospective of his work in his studio.

== Style and contributions ==
Beretta is considered among the artists in Uruguay who broke with academic painting traditions and introduced aspects of French Impressionism into local practice. His landscapes and genre scenes display a sensitivity to light and colour derived from the French impressionist tradition, adapted to Uruguayan subject-matter.

In addition to his role as painter, Beretta was a collector, promoter and educator: his studio collection, cultural salon and involvement in founding the Sociedad de Amigos del Arte (1931) placed him in a key position in the diffusion of modern art ideas in Uruguay.

== Selected works ==
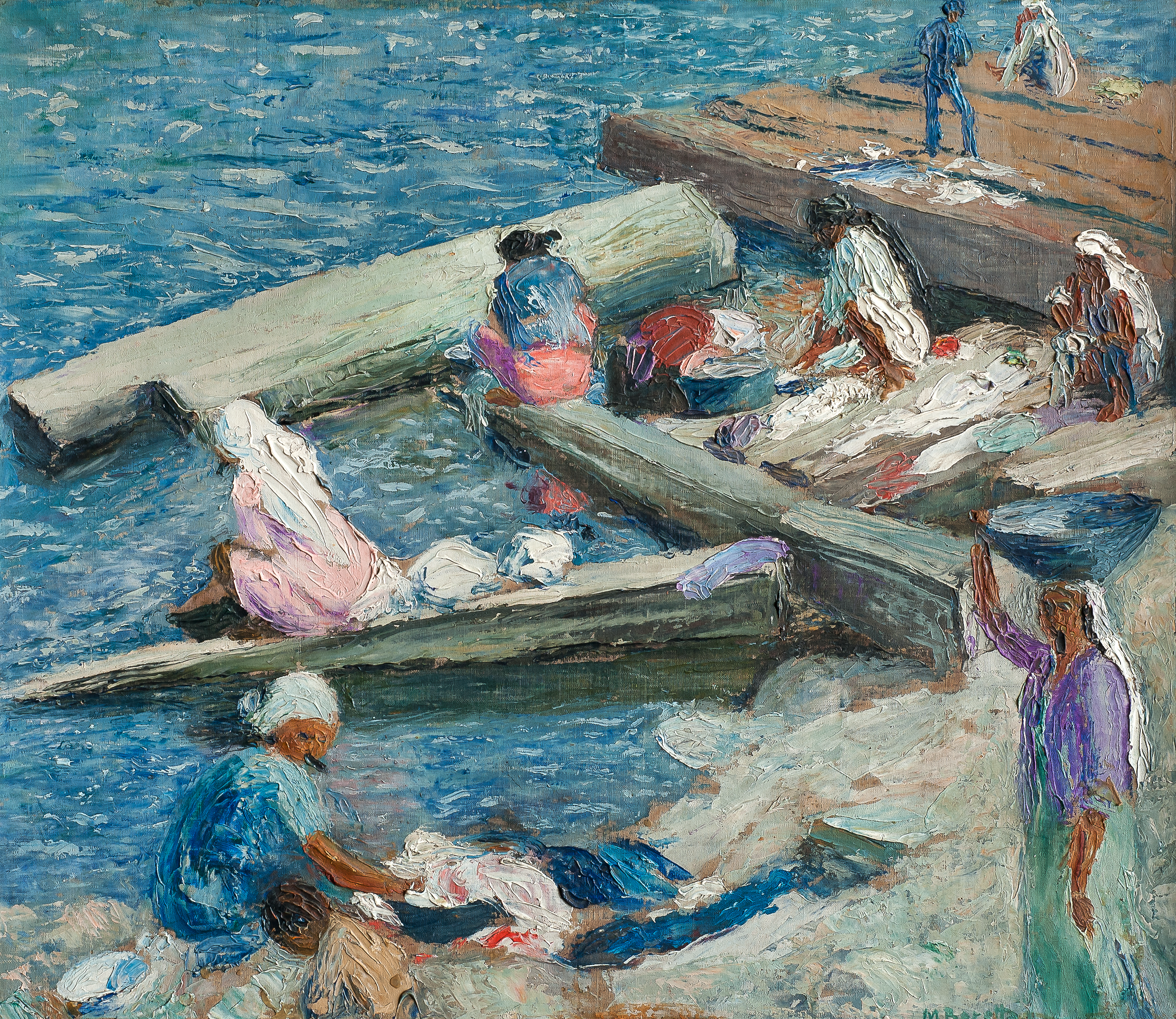
Milo Beretta - Las Lavanderas en el Paraguay

Some of his works held in the collection of the Museo Nacional de Artes Visuales (MNAV) include:

- Las lavanderas en el Paraguay, oil on canvas, 49×57.5 cm.
- Paisaje (bosque), oil on canvas, 115×152 cm, inv. 3701.
- Muelle viejo, 1906, oil on canvas, 49×70 cm, inv. 1016.

== Later life and legacy ==
Beretta died in Montevideo on 27 December 1935. His legacy lies not only in his paintings but also in his role as cultural mediator—his studio, his collection, and his connections with younger artists helped shape the environment of early 20th-century Uruguayan painting. While his oeuvre is relatively modest in volume, his impact on the shift away from academicism towards modern pictorial concerns in Uruguay is widely acknowledged.
