= Olvid =

Encrypted instant messenger app (IM)

- Original authors: Thomas Baignères, Matthieu Finiasz
- Operating system: iOS, Android
- Platform: iOS, Android, web browsers
- License: GNU Affero General Public License (client), proprietary (server-side software)
- Website: https://olvid.io/en/
- Repository: https://github.com/olvid-io

Olvid is a French-developed encrypted instant messenger app (IM) that is free and open-source. It does not store or collect any person-related data, like phone numbers. The instant messaging function includes sending text, voice notes, images, videos, and other files. Communication may be one-to-one between users or may involve group messaging. It is similar in function to WhatsApp, Signal app and Telegram app.

The decentralized database model of Olvid differentiates it from other IMs which use a central directory to establish secure channels. Olvid collects no personal data such as phone number, name, or email. The risk of a significant hack of the database is reduced because of its decentralization. Founder Cédric Sylvestre claimed in 2020 that Olvid's cybersecurity model was "much more reliable than external storage via servers." The architecture eliminates the risk of backdoor access.

== History ==
Olvid was developed by Thomas Baignères and Matthieu Finiasz in June 2019.

In January 2020 Olvid won the Prix de la Startup at the annual International Cybersecurity Forum. Olvid was selected from a field of 50 candidates for this competition.

In April 2020 Olvid transitioned into a public bug bounty programme. A verification of the cryptography was provided by the CNRS' Michel Abdalla prior to that date.

At the end of 2020 the desktop version of Olvid was released.

In 2021, the French government's information security authority ANSSI, said that the app passed its First-Level Security Certification (CSPN, fr:Certification de sécurité de premier niveau), something that no messaging app has received before.

RAID, a special unit of the Police Nationale selected Olvid for its secure internal communications in 2021.

In July 2022 the team of French digital services minister Jean-Noel Barrot began using Olvid.

In November 2023, a circular issued by Elisabeth Borne the Prime Minister of France called government members and government officers to replace WhatsApp and similar messengers by Olvid. The change was mandated to occur in December 2023.

It was noted in December 2023 that Olvid made use of Amazon Web Services and the app was thus exposed to American laws, such as the 2018 Cloud Act which can force US companies to disclose all electronic data of a user to the US government.

As of December 2023 Olvid had 100,000 registered users.

== Security ==
Olvid's website states that it is the first messenger with a guarantee that a compromised server does not impact the security of any message. The users are authenticated, but yet remain anonymous to Olvid. Though all messages transit a server, message data and metadata are encrypted on the sender's phone and only decrypted on the receiver's phone. The only data not to be encrypted is the receiver's public key, as it is required to send the message to the correct destination. The server receives the sender's IP address, but Olvid still works with any VPN service or the Tor network.
