= Melchor Méndez Magariños =

- Born: 16 November 1885; Pontevedra, Spain
- Died: 28 November 1945 (aged 60); Buenos Aires, Argentina
- Known for: Painting
- Notable work: El Éxodo del Pueblo Oriental
- Movement: Costumbrista, Fauvism, Post-Impressionism

Melchor Méndez Magariños (16 November 1885, Pontevedra, Spain – 28 November 1945, Buenos Aires, Argentina) was a prominent Uruguayan painter known for his contributions to the artistic landscape of Uruguay. His works, characterized by their strong emotional and visual impact, remain significant in the history of Latin American art.

== Early life and education ==
Melchor Méndez Magariños was born on 16 November 1885 in Pontevedra, Spain. In 1889, his family settled in Uruguay. Later, after relocating to Argentina, he studied drawing under Pío Collivadino and continued his artistic education at the National School of Fine Arts in Buenos Aires. While in Buenos Aires, he collaborated on the execution of murals at the Teatro Colón. In Uruguay, he contributed to the paintings in the Chapel of the Blessed Sacrament of the Montevideo Cathedral.

Méndez Magariños was also an accomplished engraver. Among his notable works is El Éxodo del Pueblo Oriental, currently displayed in the Legislative Palace of Uruguay.

Méndez Magariños was sent to Europe on an official mission by the Uruguayan government, where he attended the workshop of André Lhote and experienced the influence of artists such as Raoul Dufy and Othon Friesz. In Germany, he created a series of watercolors. His works, addressing various themes, ranged from historical and traditional Uruguayan subjects to local and European landscapes and religious motifs.

In addition to his painting, Méndez Magariños wrote articles on art for magazines such as Perseo and Cruz del Sur and contributed to Uruguayan newspapers. He was a costumbrista painter, characterized by a blend of caricature and a childlike quality in his style.

== Artistic style and career ==
Méndez Magariños was renowned for his exploration of various themes and techniques, which evolved over the course of his career. During his time in Europe, his art reflected a fusion of Fauvist and Post-Impressionist influences. His works often featured vivid colors, dynamic compositions, and strong emotional resonance. They reflect influences from European modernism while maintaining a distinctively Uruguayan character. He participated in numerous exhibitions in Montevideo, Buenos Aires, Paris, Havana, and Baltimore. His paintings are celebrated for their ability to bridge cultural and historical narratives, offering a rich visual language that resonates beyond geographical boundaries.
