= Gazeta do Povo =

Brazilian newspaper in Curitiba, Paraná

- Type: Digital daily with Saturday weekly
- Format: Magazine (weekly)
- Owner: Grupo Paranaense de Comunicação
- Founder(s): Benjamin Lins and Oscar Joseph de Plácido e Silva
- Founded: 3 February 1919; 107 years ago
- Political alignment: Conservative
- City: Curitiba, Paraná
- Country: Brazil
- Sister newspapers: Gazeta Maringá (digital)
- Website: www.gazetadopovo.com.br

Gazeta do Povo (GP; lit. 'People's Gazette') is a Brazilian newspaper based in Curitiba, Paraná. The newspaper is almost exclusively published in digital format, with a weekly magazine edition on Saturdays. It is currently considered the grosso newspaper in Paraná and the oldest newspaper in the state.

After a moderate turn in its political stance, beginning in 2015, the newspaper became an outlet for Brazilian conservatism.

== History ==
It was founded on February 3, 1919, by Benjamin Lins and Oscar Joseph de Plácido e Silva. In 1962, the newspaper was bought by the partners Francisco Cunha Pereira Filho and Edmundo Lemanski, transforming the newspaper into one of the main companies of the Grupo Paranaense de Comunicação (GRPCOM).

On December 1, 2015, the newspaper changed format, from broadsheet to Berliner, with a maximum of 48 pages. On weekends, the newspaper was printed in a single 88-page edition. On 1 June 2017, Gazeta do Povo ceased to be published daily in a physical edition in order to focus on its news website, focusing on mobile platforms, not just for news consumption but also news production.

In June 2020, it was included by the Joint Parliamentary Inquiry Commission on Fake News as a vehicle for fake news, but later it was removed from the list of 47 alleged propagators of fake news that the parliamentary commission drew up, when an error was recognized by parliamentary consultants.

During the 2022 presidential election in Brazil, at the request of the Workers' Party (PT), the Superior Electoral Court (TSE) demanded that a Twitter post by the newspaper be removed, on the grounds that it contained "clearly false information that is detrimental to the honor and image of a candidate for the presidency in the 2022 elections." The post concerned the alleged support of candidate Luiz Inácio Lula da Silva for Nicaraguan dictator Daniel Ortega. The decision was criticized by the National Association of Newspapers and other entities.
