= Douglas Garcia =

Brazilian former state deputy and politician

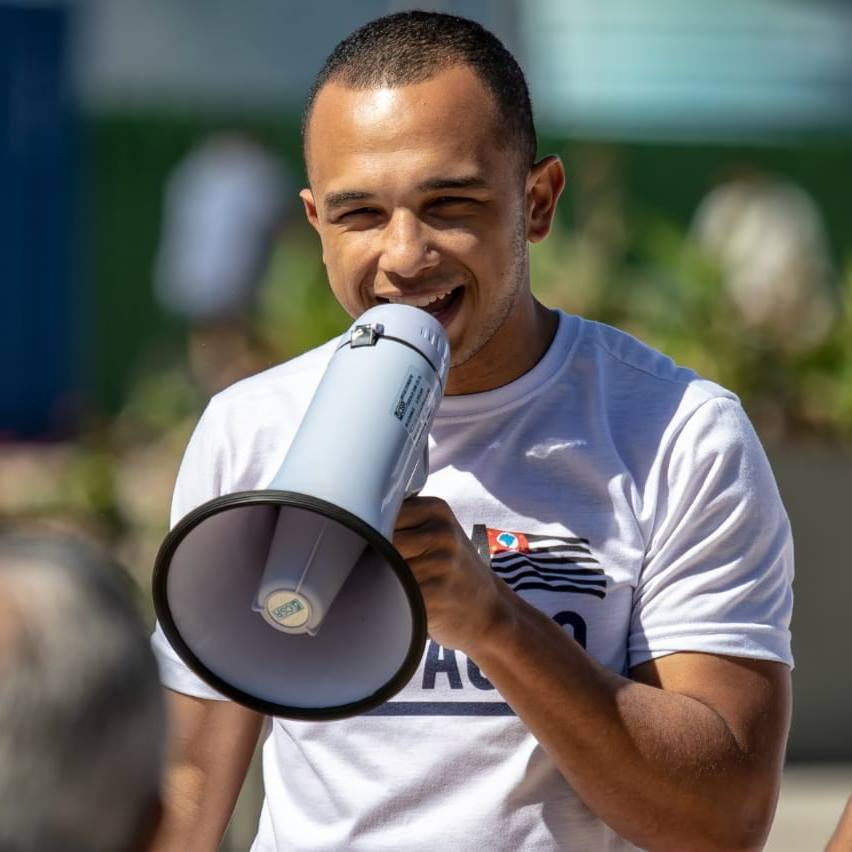
- Garcia in 2018

State Deputy for São Paulo
- In office 15 March 2019 – 15 March 2023

Personal details
- Born: Douglas Garcia Bispo dos Santos; January 26, 1994 (age 32) São Paulo, São Paulo, Brazil
- Party: União Brasil (since 2024)

Douglas Garcia Bispo dos Santos (born in São Paulo on January 26, 1994) is a Brazilian former state deputy in São Paulo. He is affiliated with the Republicans. He was elected in 2018. He is anti-communist and an ally of conservative president Jair Bolsonaro.

In the 2022 election, he obtained just over 24,000 votes and was not elected federal deputy, being without holding a public office as soon as his term ends in March 2023.

== Political activity ==
Garcia participated in street demonstrations while leading the conservative Direita São Paulo movement. In 2018, he was elected state deputy of São Paulo with 74,351 votes.

== Personal life ==
=== Carnival parade paying homage to torture center ===
Garcia created the Porão do DOPS carnival block in 2018, a reference to the Civil Police agency responsible for the torture and murder of thousands of people during the military dictatorship in Brazil. The block honored Carlos Brilhante Ustra, one of the most active torturers in the political repression during the dictatorship.

=== Transgender people ===
On April 5, 2019, the day after threatening to assault a transsexual woman who used the same bathroom as his mother or sister, Garcia admitted to being homosexual. On the tribune of the Legislative Assembly of São Paulo (ALESP), he stated: "It does not diminish in any way the causes that I have been defending here in the Legislative Assembly against 'gender ideology'".

=== Support for skinheads ===
Douglas Garcia published a restricted-view post on his social media praising the Skinheads. In the text, Garcia wrote that "the Skinheads are nationalists, pro-family, they are exactly like us, they only differ because they beat up the communists (which I very much approve of, by the way)". In 2017, in protest against the visit of philosopher Judith Butler to Brazil, Garcia thanked the far-right extremist gang Carecas do ABC, a São Paulo faction that preaches hatred against Black people, people from the Northeast of Brazil, and LGBTQ people, involved in the murder of Edson Néris da Silva in 2000, among other crimes.

=== Dissemination of fake news and expulsion from the Social Liberal Party ===
According to a survey by Aos Fatos in May 2020, Douglas Garcia and a group of seven congressmen investigated in the Fake News Inquiry published an average of two posts per day on social media over a three-month period, containing misinformation or critically mentioning the Supreme Federal Court (STF).

In July 2020, Garcia was expelled from the Social Liberal Party for violating the party's code of ethics by engaging in political activities contrary to the democratic regime. Two months earlier, the party had suspended Douglas for spreading fake news and attacking democratic institutions.

=== Attack on journalist Vera Magalhães ===
On September 13, 2022, after a debate between candidates for governor of São Paulo, Douglas Garcia verbally assaulted journalist Vera Magalhães, calling her a "disgrace to journalism" and shouting false accusations about her salary at TV Cultura. Vera had to leave the debate venue under escort and stated that she would file a police report against the congressman. Following the assault, a number of politicians expressed solidarity with Vera, including São Paulo gubernatorial candidates Fernando Haddad (PT), Rodrigo Garcia (PSDB), and Tarcísio Freitas (Republicanos), the latter from the same party as Douglas Garcia. In a video released on social media, Douglas Garcia apologized to Tarcísio Freitas, but not to Vera Magalhães.

Media outlets also condemned the deputy's action, such as O Globo and CBN, which, in a statement, classified Garcia's act as "an attack on the free press". Press organizations, such as the National Federation of Journalists (Fenaj), the Union of Professional Journalists in the State of São Paulo (SJ-SP), the National Association of Newspapers (ANJ), the Brazilian Association of Radio and Television Broadcasters (ABERT) and the National Association of Magazine Publishers (ANER). The latter three, in a joint statement, described Garcia's action as "an unacceptable attack on freedom of the press".

==== Investigation by the Public Prosecutor's Office and requests for impeachment ====
By the morning of September 15, the Legislative Assembly of São Paulo had received eight requests for the removal of Garcia from office, formulated by ten politicians, with the Ethics Council of the house responsible for accepting their processing. The Public Prosecutor's Office of São Paulo initiated a criminal investigation against Garcia to ascertain the commission of the crimes of stalking and emotional harm to Vera Magalhães. According to the journalist's lawyers, the parliamentarian has been harassing her since 2020, using, among other tactics, fake news to attack her.
