= Associação Nacional de História =

Brazilian History association

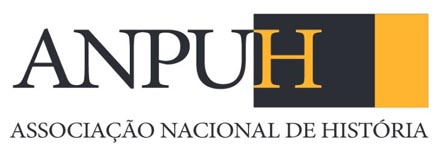
- Abbreviation: ANPUH
- Formation: 1961
- Location: Brazil
- Official language: Portuguese

The Associação Nacional de História (ANPUH) is a non-profit civil association that organizes and represents historians in Brazil (teachers, professors and researchers) and encourages the study and teaching of history. ANPUH is associated with the Brazilian Society for the Progress of Science in the area of Human Sciences.

== History ==
ANPUH was founded on October 19, 1961 in the city of Marília (São Paulo) as the National Association of University Professors of History (in the original: Associação Nacional de Professores Universitários de História) in the field of professionals linked to undergraduate and graduate courses in History, the institution gradually expanded its membership base, also incorporating primary and secondary school teachers and, more recently, professionals working in public and private archives and in heritage and memory institutions throughout the country. Since then, the organization contributes with the federal government in the creation of the

(BNCC), the listing of subjects that must be taught in every school in Brazil in order for the school to receive accreditation.

As of 1993, the opening of the entity to all professionals linked to the area of history also led to the change of name, which was renamed Associação Nacional de História, preserving, however, the acronym that has identified it for more than 40 years.

== Activities ==
Every two years, ANPUH holds the National History Symposium. In the interval between two national symposiums, the Regional Sections organize their respective state meetings.

== Publication ==
ANPUH is also responsible for the journals "Revista Brasileira de História" "Revista História Hoje", dedicated to the theme of History and Teaching, and Caliandra.
