= Terça Livre =

Defunct news portal

- Type: Website
- Format: Blog
- Staff writers: Allan Lopes dos Santos e Italo Lorenzon Neto
- Founded: 2014
- Ceased publication: 23 October 2021
- Website: www.tercalivre.com.br

Terça Livre (in English: Free Tuesday) was a Brazilian news portal maintained by Allan Lopes dos Santos and Italo Lorenzon Neto. The channel gained notoriety in the 2018 Brazilian presidential elections for its proximity with the then PSL candidate and later Brazilian president Jair Bolsonaro and by producing content aligned with conservatism and right ideas.

Terça Livre was suspended on Twitter and ended on YouTube for violation of the terms of use of these platforms. On February 12, 2020, it obtained an injunction from the Court of Justice of the State of São Paulo to recover his YouTube account and returned to the air on March 2, 2021.

The site is involved in the CPMI das Fake News (Fake News Joint Congressional Inquiry Committee) through accusations by parliamentarians of fake news proliferation. Allan dos Santos denies the accusations that he was linked to Jair Bolsonaro or that he was spreading false news.

The portal defined itself as the largest conservative portal outside the United States. In April 2021, the channel Terça Livre TV had 1.2 million subscribers on YouTube. According to a survey by the verification agency Aos Fatos published on February 4, 2021, Terça Livre is the largest pocket TV channel on Telegram with the largest number of subscribers, the largest number of views, the largest number of published posts and the highest average of views per post.

On October 23, 2021, after the Brazilian Federal police issued an arrest warrant against Allan Dos Santos, who is currently living as an expatriate in the United States, Italo Lorenzon, one of the website's co-founders, announced that they would be ceasing activities, claiming censorship and lack of financial support as the main reasons behind the closure.

== History ==
The portal was created in 2014 by Allan dos Santos with the aim of defending conservatism.

The portal gained notoriety in the 2018 Brazilian presidential elections for its proximity to the family of Jair Bolsonaro. The site became known for following Olavo de Carvalho's ideas and defending the right, remaining as one of the most popular platforms in the defense of Bolsonaro and of the Brazilian right.

In January 2019, he obtained free traffic conditions in the inauguration of President Jair Bolsonaro alongside other media outlets such as Brasil Paralelo and Political Connection, while journalists from various vehicles reported limitations on the work of journalistic coverage of the inauguration, including regarding food, bathroom and access to authorities and sources. According to a survey by Poder360, with data from January 1, 2019, to December 31, 2020, Terça Livre was the sixth press agency with which Bolsonaro most met, having held 4 meetings recorded on the official agenda.

Allan dos Santos, however, denies that he has a connection with Jair Bolsonaro and declared in a testimony to the CPMI of Fake News that, being the "owner of the largest conservative portal in Latin America", he does not receive "any cent from the government".

== Accusations of fake news ==
In October 2018, the portal released the news "Quadrilha detida withdrawing 68 million from Haddad", information that was falsified by Estadão Verifica and Boatos.org.

In November 2019, the portal was involved in Fake News' CPMI on charges of running fake news. Twitter suspended the Terça Livre account for violating the terms of use. Allan dos Santos later claimed to have left Brazil for fear of reprisals.

According to a survey by the Agência Pública, the Terça Livre was one of the channels that encouraged the invasion of the United States Capitol, by accusing, without evidence, that the elections were rigged. According to the digital media researcher, David Nemer, Bolsonarist media seeking an audience "brought the American conflict to Brazil".

According to an analysis of the website E-farsas published on November 11, 2020, Allan dos Santos produced fake news when he stated that the agency Aos Fatos would receive funding from the Open Society Foundations network, founded by George Soros. According to the E-farms website, the fact-checking agency is not funded either directly or indirectly through the International Fact-Checking Network (IFCN) as claimed by dos Santos.

Cecília Almeida Rodrigues Lima, Janaina de Holanda Costa Calazans and Ivo Henrique Dantas, researchers from the Federal University of Pernambuco, point out that the video China and WHO hid hydroxychloroquine from you, uses a statement by Olavo de Carvalho as a title, without directly quoting it from in order to suggest a personal opinion as fact. According to the researchers, the video was later removed from YouTube for violating content guidelines and "also implies the participation of the government of China and WHO itself in a plot to hide the truth and harm the population." The objective would be to disseminate the doubt in the viewer, discrediting institutions such as the WHO and its recommendations for virus prevention (social distance, hygiene, wearing masks, etc.). According to the study, other entities were also discredited by the channel, in the video ESTADÃO: CHLOROQUINA NO, BUT MACONHA YES, the presenters suggest that Brazilian institutions such as the Order of Attorneys of Brazil would be infiltrated by communists.

In January 2021, the Sleeping Giants movement asked the Droga Raia network to stop running ads on the Terça Livre YouTube channel. Droga Raia announced that it does not condone "the spread of fake news" and removed the ads.

Allan dos Santos denies the accusations that he is spreading false news.

=== Constança Rezende ===
On March 1, 2019, Terca Livre published an article entitled Jornalista do Estadão: the intention is to ruin Flávio Bolsonaro and the government, in which it states that Constança Rezende, a journalist from O Estado de S. Paulo, would have admitted the objective to ruin the term of president and his family. The complaint would be based on the French journalist Jawad Rhalib, who would have spoken to Rezende. The news was shared by President Jair Bolsonaro on Twitter and then was challenged by Estadão, according to which "Constance Rezende did not interview or spoke with French journalist quoted by Terça Livre. The recording phrases were taken from a conversation she had on January 23 with a person who introduced herself as Alex MacAllister, a supposed student interested in doing a comparative study between Donald Trump and Jair Bolsonaro". The fact-checking agency Lupa confirmed this version: "The quote used by the website in the title of her report is false. The quote attributed to the reporter does not even appear in the transcript that the page itself makes of all the conversation that the journalist from Estadão would have allegedly kept in English with a foreigner, about the investigation involving Flávio Bolsonaro.

According to the newspaper O Globo, which corroborates Agência Lupa, journalist Allan dos Santos, in a live on Facebook, would have attributed to the journalist another post, in which he would have written: "Brazil has become a dictatorship. Death like Marielle's made this very clear. Congratulations! A woman's place is where she wants it! They won't shut up our voice". According to the newspaper, such a statement would have "no connection between Constance and the account or the post".

=== YouTube ===
On February 4, 2021, the site's YouTube channel, Terça Livre TV, was shut down on YouTube for repeated violation of terms of use. Guilherme Sanchez, senior lawyer at Google, responsible for the YouTube platform, explains that the channel posted content inciting violence. One of the videos posted denounced fraud in the United States presidential elections without offering concrete evidence. Even warned, they posted a video, addressing the invasion of the US Congress by supporters of Donald Trump, which was classified as "inciting others to commit violent acts against individuals or a defined group of people". For this reason, they were suspended for seven days. The day after the suspension, they used an alternative channel to circumvent the sanction, so they were closed off the platform.

The day after the closure, the Order of Journalists of Brazil manifested itself in a note, repudiating the closure of the channel, classifying the YouTube action as censorship and, according to Allan dos Santos, deputy Eduardo Bolsonaro would have sought the Attorney General's Office of the Republic.

On February 12, 2020, Terça Livre obtained an injunction at the Court of Justice of the State of São Paulo to recover its YouTube account, the judge Mathias Coltro justified that the "removal of accounts on the YouTube platform is disproportionate, violating the constitutional guarantee of freedom of expression and information". The platform appealed the decision, but Coltro ratified his decision on February 19, 2021, because "the reasons that led to the granting of the injunction remain". The judge also increased the daily fine for non-compliance with the sentence from five thousand to ten thousand reais. The channel returned to the air on the morning of March 2, 2021. It is currently visible only from Brazil.

== See also ==
- Brasil Paralelo
- Rádio AuriVerde
- Conservative wave
