= Allan dos Santos =

Brazilian conservative media personality

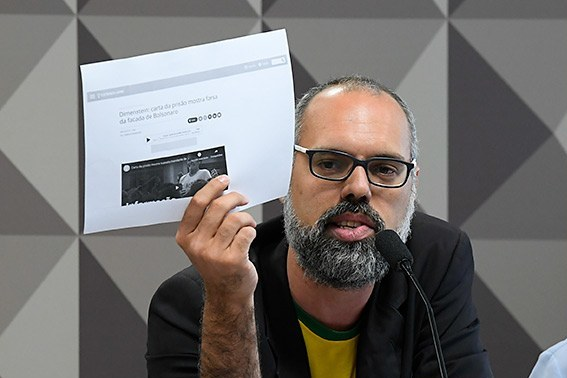
Allan dos Santos

Allan Lopes dos Santos is a Brazilian conservative journalist, political pundit, and convicted criminal wanted by Brazilian justice. As of 2024, he was facing an investigation by the Brazilian Supreme Court on several charges, including disseminating fake news and financing attacks against the democratic institutions in Brazil. He fled to the United States in July 2020, residing in Central Florida since then.

== Early life ==
Allan Dos Santos converted to Roman Catholicism from a Baptist Protestant denomination, having become a seminarian at the Maria Mater Ecclesiae Seminary in Brazil. After graduating, in the 2000s, he joined the Priestly Fraternity of Saint Peter, having served this group in the United States, where he worked as a journalist for the Catholic news portal Church Militant, based in the State of Michigan.

== Social media influencer career ==
In 2014, dos Santos started a YouTube channel and blog called Terça Livre (Free Tuesday) after abandoning his earlier religious vocation and discovering a passion for blogging during his travels in the United States. Dos Santos used his blog as a platform to express ultra-conservative views, attacking left-wing politicians and traditional media while advocating against what he perceived as a cultural threat to families. He drew inspiration from Church Militant, a subscription-based blog known for its positions against social-welfare programs, illegal immigration, and abortion.

The channel was shut down by YouTube in 2021 after a request from the Brazilian Supreme Court.

In February 2022 it was reported that Dos Santos was facing an investigation conducted by the Brazilian Supreme Court regarding allegations of spreading false information, commonly referred to as "fake news". The investigation encompasses not only the dissemination of false information but also potential threats directed toward members of the Court. In October 2021, De Moraes, the judge involved in the case, issued an order for Santos' preventive detention and instructed the Ministry of Justice to immediately commence the extradition process, seeking his return from the United States to Brazil.

Investigations by the Brazilian Supreme Court showed that Santos may have received public money from government officials in exchange for promoting conspiracy theories targeting their political opponents, which Santos denies. Following the investigations Santos fled to the United States, leading the Brazilian Supreme Court to file a request for him to be extradited back to Brazil, although as of 2024 the request remains pending by the US authorities.

On October 6, 2026 the judge Alexandre de Moraes declared that those accusations had been filed.

== Personal life ==
Dos Santos married after leaving the cassock, and is the father of three children.

Dos Santos has made several appearances in Lagoinha Church of Orlando, Florida, in the past years. The Brazilian Justice believes he has been living on an expired tourist visa, overstaying his maximum allowed stay, and his Brazilian passport has been canceled by the Brazilian Supreme Court.
