= List of Brazilian films of 2004 =

A list of films produced in Brazil in 2004 (see 2004 in film):

== 2004 ==
Title	Director	Cast	Genre	Notes
A Alma do Osso				
Amazon Forever				
Araguaya - A Conspiração do Silêncio				
Arte na Minha Casa				
Ato II Cena 5				
Cazuza - O Tempo Não Pára	Walter Carvalho			
Entreatos	João Moreira Salles	Luiz Inácio Lula da Silva, Marisa Letícia Lula da Silva, José Dirceu	Documentary	
Rolling Family	Pablo Trapero			Co-production with Argentina, France, Germany, Spain and the United Kingdom
Olga			Drama	
Sexo, Amor e Traição		Malu Mader	Comedy	
Xuxa e o Tesouro da Cidade Perdida		Xuxa	Fantasy adventure children's film	

== See also ==
- 2004 in Brazil
- 2004 in Brazilian television
