= Macro BMA =

Defunct Argentine bank

Banco BMA S.A.U.
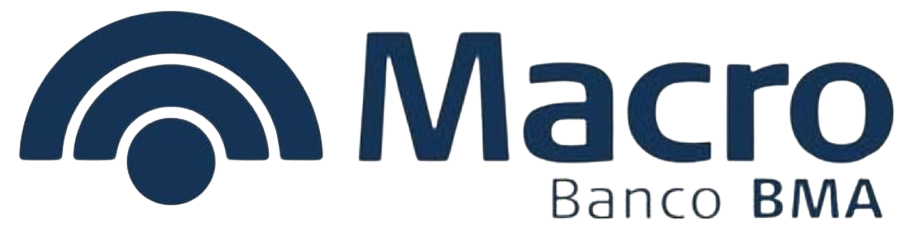

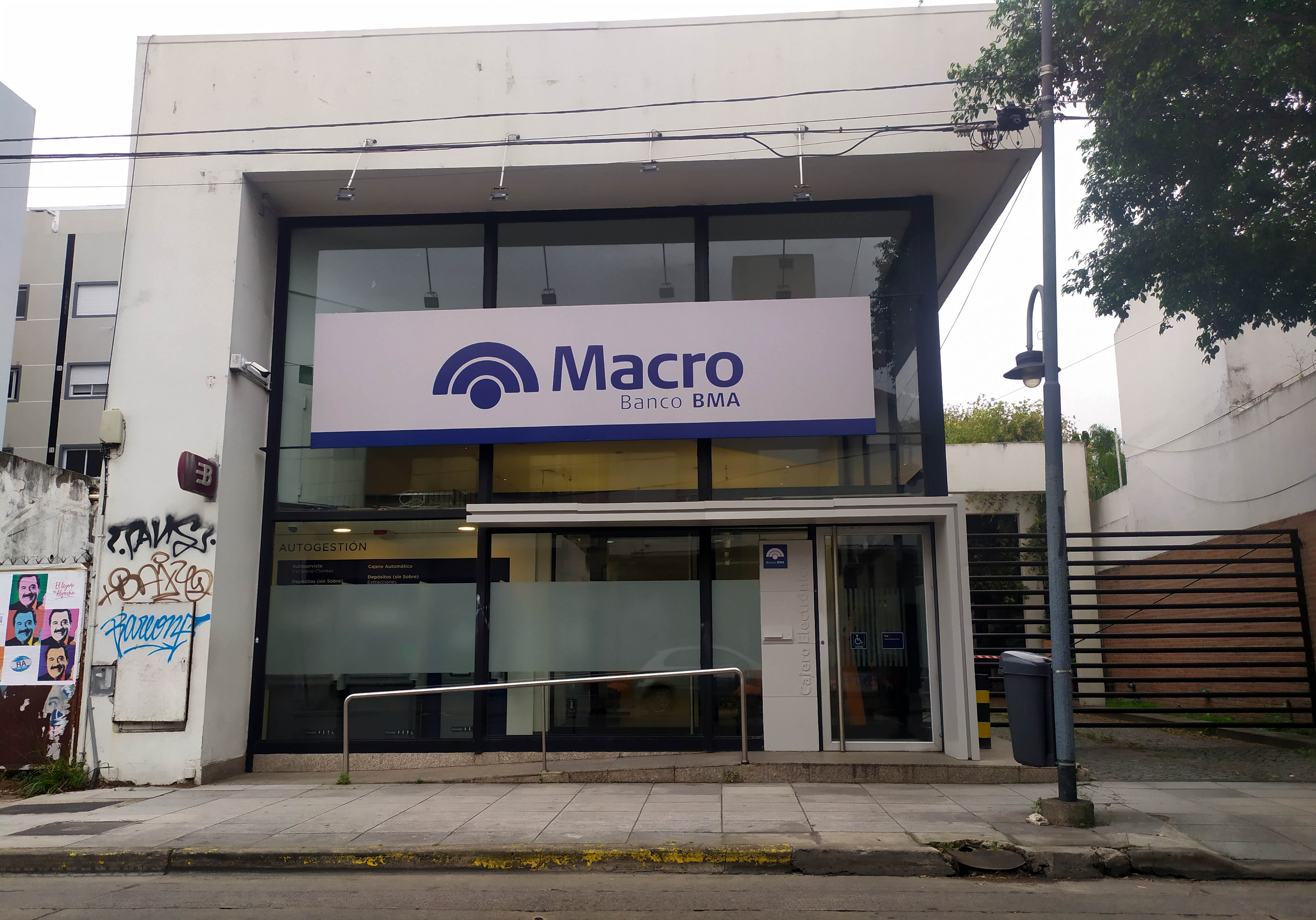
- Formerly: Banco Itaú Argentina
- Company type: Subsidiary
- Industry: Finance and Insurance
- Founded: November 4, 2023; 2 years ago
- Defunct: November 19, 2024
- Fate: Merged with Banco Macro
- Successor: Banco Macro
- Headquarters: Buenos Aires, Argentina
- Products: Banking; Insurance; Private Bank
- Revenue: ▲US$ 296.7 million (2012)
- Net income: ▲US$ 22.4 million (2012)
- Total assets: ▼US$ 2.0 billion (2012)
- Number of employees: 1,650
- Parent: Banco Macro
- Website: www.macrobma.com.ar (archived)

Macro BMA was an Argentine banking entity owned by Banco Macro between November 2023 and November 2024. It was a successor to the Argentine subsidiary of the Brazilian Itaú bank, created on November 4, 2023, one day after the Argentine Central Bank authorized Grupo Macro to acquire the aforementioned subsidiary. It ceased to exist on November 19, 2024, after which all of Macro BMA's customers became part of Macro.

== History ==
Brazilian banking conglomerate Itaú Unibanco originally agreed to sell the entirety of its Argentine subsidiary (Banco Itaú Argentina) to Grupo Macro for US$50 million on August 24, 2023. However, the sale required approval from the Argentine Central Bank, which authorized the transaction on November 3 of the same year.

One day later on November 4, 2023, Banco Itaú Argentina was renamed to Macro BMA (registered as Banco BMA S.A.U). The bank existed as a separate entity from its parent for 1 year and 15 days. Macro first announced it would merge the two banks together in early September 2024, anticipating the November 19, 2024 date.

As planned, Macro BMA alongside all of its customers and their products were fully fused into Banco Macro on November 19, 2024.
