= Banco Itaú Chile =

Bank of Chile

Banco Itaú Chile S.A.
- Company type: Subsidiary
- Industry: Finance and Insurance
- Founded: 2006
- Defunct: 2014
- Successor: Itaú Corpbanca
- Headquarters: Santiago, Chile
- Products: Banking; Insurance; Private Banking
- Revenue: ▲US$ 436.6 million (2012)
- Net income: ▲US$ 81.9 million (2012)
- Total assets: ▲US$ 11.3 billion (2012)
- Number of employees: 2,451
- Parent: Itaú Unibanco
- Website: www.itau.cl

Banco Itaú Chile was a Chilean bank, which was established when Brazilian bank Banco Itaú acquired the Chilean operations of BankBoston in 2006. It merged with Corpbanca in 2016, and was subsequently renamed as Itaú Corpbanca initially and as Banco Itaú Chile later in 2023. It was headquartered in Santiago.

== History ==
Banco Itaú was founded on 2 January 1944 as Banco Central de Crédito S.A. in São Paulo, Brazil, and was renamed as such in 1964. Banco Itaú Chile was established in September 2006, when Banco Itaú acquired the Chilean operations of BankBoston. BankBoston, which was owned by Bank of America, was at the time ranked as the twelfth-largest financial institution in Chile, with 44 branches and approximately 58,000 clients. On 28 February 2007, BankBoston Chile was renamed as Banco Itaú Chile after regulatory approval by the Superintendency of Banks and Financial Institutions (Comisión para el Mercado Financiero). In September 2011, Banco Itaú Chile announced the acquisition of HSBC's retail banking network in Chile.

Banco de Concepción was established on 6 September 1871, authorised by Supreme Decree No. 318 of the Chilean government, and began operations on 16 October of that year. Its ownership was transferred to Corporación de Fomento de la Producción, a government agency in Chile. The ownership changed hands multiple times over the years, before it passed on to INFISA (later known as CorpGroup), and the bank was rebranded as Corpbanca in 1997. Corpbanca and Banco Itaú Chile announced a merger in January 2014. After the merger was approved by the authorities, it was formalized on 1 April 2016, and the combined entity was renamed Itaú Corpbanca. In March 2023, the bank changed its name to Banco Itaú Chile.
