= Unibanco =

Former Brazilian bank

União de Bancos Brasileiros S.A.
- Type: Subsidiary
- Industry: Finance and Insurance
- Founded: Poços de Caldas, Minas Gerais, Brazil (1924)
- Defunct: 2009
- Headquarters: São Paulo, São Paulo, Brazil
- Key people: João Moreira Salles, Founder; Pedro Moreira Salles CEO; Pedro Malan, Member of the Board of Directors
- Products: Banking
- Revenue: ▲US$ 19.3 Billion (2007)
- Net income: ▲US$ 2.1 Billion (2007)
- Total assets: ▲US$ 424 Billion (2015)
- Number of employees: 51,300
- Parent: Itaú Unibanco
- Website: www.unibanco.com.br

Unibanco S.A. was a Brazilian bank that operated from 1924 to 2009, when it was merged into Banco Itaú. The name stood for União de Bancos Brasileiros ("Union of Brazilian Banks").

== Foundation ==
In 1924, João Moreira Salles established the Casa Bancária Moreira Salles (Moreira Salles Banking House) in the city of Poços de Caldas, state of Minas Gerais. His son Walter Moreira Salles was named an acting partner in 1933 at the young age of twenty-one.

== Regional mergers ==
In 1940, Banco Moreira Salles catalyzed its growth by merging with three regional banks, eventually changing its name to União de Bancos Brasileiros (Unibanco).

== Acquisition of Banco Nacional ==
Over time, Unibanco relocated its headquarters to São Paulo, in the state of São Paulo, the principal financial center of Brazil. The institution expanded steadily and became the country's third-largest privately owned bank, a position strengthened by its acquisition of Banco Nacional in 1995. Banco Nacional had entered into financial difficulties and ultimately failed during the banking crisis that accompanied the initial years of the Real Plan, a period in which several major Brazilian financial institutions were restructured or liquidated.

== Listed, family-controlled, company ==
Even though its shares were listed on the São Paulo Stock Exchange (Bovespa), the bank was largely controlled by its founding Moreira Salles family. Until his death in 2001, Walter Moreira Salles - a renowned banker and diplomat, who served as Brazilian ambassador to the United States, as well as Brazilian Finance Minister - headed the family. After 2006, his son Pedro Moreira Salles served as the company's Chief Executive Officer and Vice Chairman of the Board.

== Merger with Banco Itaú ==
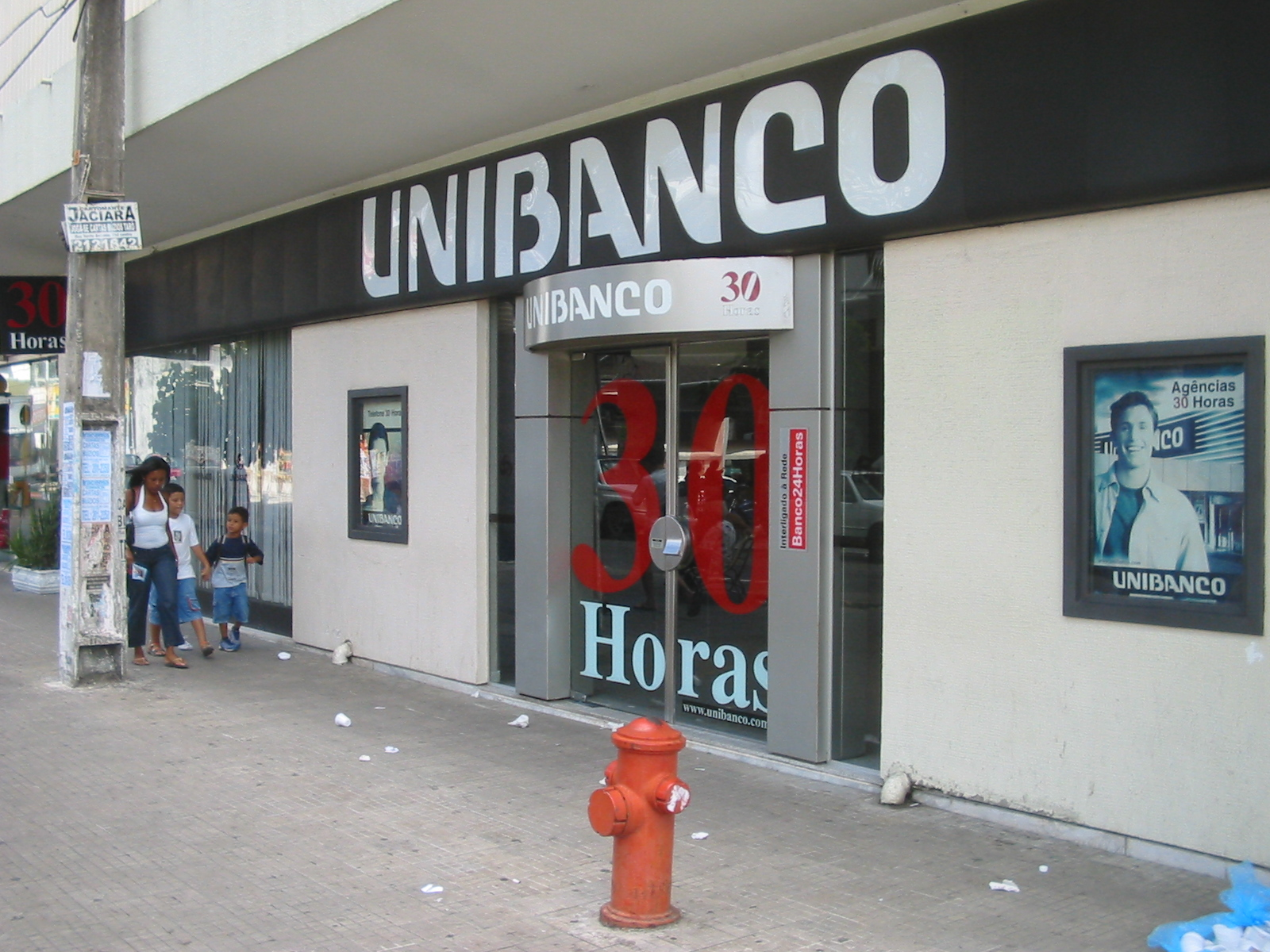
Unibanco branch in Natal, Rio Grande do Norte, Brazil, carrying the bank's former branding.

On November 2, 2008, Unibanco and the second largest Brazilian private banking group, Banco Itaú, announced plans for a merger. The merger was approved by the Central Bank of Brazil in late February 2009. As a result of the merger process, Unibanco agencies became new Itaú agencies by the end of 2010, and the Itaú name became the strongest brand in the Brazilian private sector banking market. The defunct bank's name survives in the new merged bank's holding company, which became Itaú Unibanco Holding S.A. However, only the Itaú brand is now used in the bank's corporate image.
