= When the Marquee's Lights Go Out =

Brazilian documentary film

- Film poster
- Original title: Quando as Luzes das Marquises se Apagam
- Directed by: Renato Brandão
- Written by: Renato Brandão
- Produced by: Amanda Ferreira; Renato Brandão
- Cinematography: Pedro Watanabe; Raoni Maddalena; Simon Vialas
- Edited by: Bruna Carvalho Almeida; Renato Brandão
- Release date: April 17, 2018 (It's All True)
- Running time: 86 minutes
- Country: Brazil
- Language: Portuguese

When the Marquee's Lights Go Out (Portuguese: Quando as Luzes das Marquises se Apagam) is a 2018 Brazilian documentary film by Renato Brandão. The film tells the story of the traditional movie theaters in an area called Cinelândia Paulistana (Note: The name Cinelandia, literally "Cinema land", was inspired by a homonymous area in Rio de Janeiro.), in the Downtown São Paulo.

The film premiered at the 2018 It's All True – International Documentary Film Festival.

== Plot ==
Based on testimonials from former regular cinema goers (including the writer Ignácio de Loyola Brandão) and extensive archival footage, the documentary presents the story of the movie theaters located between the São João and Ipiranga avenues, in downtown São Paulo.

Known as Cinelândia Paulistana, this area held the largest concentration of cinemas in the city, including the Art-Palácio, the Metro, the Ipiranga, the Marabá, the Comodoro Cinerama, and reached its peak heyday in the 1950s and 1960s.

The urban decay of the city center in the 1970s and the emergence of the multiple-screen theaters often located in shopping malls and the home viewing on VHS in the 1980s reduced much of the allure of Cinelandia Paulistana, which saw the closing of its several famous cinemas, while its fewer remaining theaters specializes in showing adult pornographic movies.

== Release ==
The film was included in the Official Selection at the 23rd It's All True – International Documentary Film Festival and had its premiere on April 17, 2018.

In 2020, it was screened again at the It's All True Film Festival for a special event.

Also that year, it was screened online at the Arquivo Em Cartaz - International archive film festival.
