= Banco Santander Chile =

Santander Chile Holding S.A.
- Type: Sociedad Anónima
- Traded as: BCS: BSANTANDER; NYSE: BSAC
- Industry: Finance and Insurance
- Founded: 1978
- Headquarters: Santiago, Chile
- Key people: Mauricio Larraín, (CEO)
- Products: Banking
- Revenue: ▲US$ 4.1 billion (2017)
- Net income: ▲US$ 871.1 million (2018)
- Total assets: ▲US$ 58.0 billion (2018)
- Number of employees: 11,001
- Parent: Santander Group
- Website: www.santander.cl

Banco Santander-Chile is the largest bank in Chile by loans and deposits. The bank has 504 branches network. It is a subsidiary of the Santander Group. Its main competitors are Banco de Chile, Itaú Corpbanca and BCI.

It provides commercial and retail banking services to its customers, including Chilean peso and foreign currency denominated loans to finance commercial transactions, trade, foreign currency forward contracts and credit lines, and retail banking services, including mortgage financing. In addition to its traditional banking operations, the bank offers financial services, including financial leasing, financial advisory services, mutual fund management, securities brokerage, insurance brokerage and investment management.

Its clients are divided into three segments: retail, middle-market, and global banking and markets.
