= Intermissions (documentary) =

2004 Brazilian documentary by João Moreira Salles

Entreatos
- Directed by: João Moreira Salles
- Written by: João Moreira Salles
- Produced by: Maurício Andrade Ramos (executive producer); Raquel Freire Zangrandi (production manager)
- Starring: Luiz Inácio Lula da Silva; José Dirceu; Marisa Letícia Lula da Silva
- Cinematography: Walter Carvalho
- Edited by: Felipe Lacerda
- Release date: 2004
- Running time: 117 minutes
- Country: Brazil
- Language: Portuguese

Intermissions (Portuguese: Entreatos) is a 2004 Brazilian documentary film, directed by Brazilian filmmaker João Moreira Salles, that takes a behind-the-scenes look at Luiz Inácio Lula da Silva's 2002 political campaign.

== Background ==
From September 25 to October 27, 2002, the crew of the documentary Intermissions, led by João Moreira Salles, followed Luiz Inácio Lula da Silva’s presidential campaign step by step during the 2002 election. This was the fourth time Luiz Inácio Lula da Silva, representing the Workers' Party (PT), had run for president, following a second-round defeat to Fernando Collor de Mello (PRN) in 1989 and two first-round defeats to Fernando Henrique Cardoso (PSDB) in 1994 and 1998. Lula won the election after defeating José Serra (PSDB), receiving 61% of the vote.

In an interview with journalist Juca Kfouri on the program EntreVistas, broadcast by TV dos Trabalhadores in 2021, João remarked that the scene in which Lula is declared president was almost cut. João stated that after Lula's victory, when the newly elected president was declared president and went to the InterContinental Hotel in the Paulista Avenue area of São Paulo, the film crew returned to the hotel where they were staying, the Hilton Hotel in São Paulo. To celebrate the end of filming, the crew hugged each other and went to Paulista Avenue, where Lula gave a speech. Later, the crew realized one of the cameras was missing. After calling the police, suspecting that the van parked near Paulista Avenue might have been robbed, they decided to return to the Hilton around 3 a.m., where they searched the room but did not find the camera. As they got off the elevator, the crew realized that the camera had been left on the sofa in the hotel lobby for approximately six hours, containing exclusive, never-before-seen footage of how the PT's inner circle celebrated Lula's victory.

== Cast ==
Among the political figures featured in the documentary are:

- Lula;
- Marisa Letícia Lula da Silva;
- Aloizio Mercadante;
- José Dirceu;
- Antonio Palocci;
- Duda Mendonça;
- Ciro Gomes;
- Eduardo Suplicy;
- Frei Betto;
- Gilberto Carvalho;
- Guido Mantega;
- José Alencar;
- José Graziano da Silva;
- Luis Favre;
- Luiz Dulci;
- Luiz Gushiken;
- Mário Kertész;
- Ricardo Kotscho;
- Sílvio Pereira;
- Marco Aurélio Garcia;
- André Vítor Singer;
- Paulo Rocha;
- Wilson Thimotheo.

== Release ==
The film was released in theaters in 2004.

=== Home media ===
The DVD of the film was released on November 17, 2006. Along with it, a second film, Atos, was released, directed and edited by filmmaker Eduardo Escorel, with a runtime of approximately 2 hours and 40 minutes. Unlike, which focuses on the private and behind-the-scenes moments of the campaign, “Atos” shows the public side: rallies, marches, and political events that were left out of the first film. Atos features previously unseen footage, including phone calls between Lula and George W. Bush and Tony Blair.

== Reception ==
=== Critical ===
Danilo Corci, writing for the pop culture website Omelete, gave the film a rating of three out of five. In his positive review, Corci stated, Intermissions presents three sides of the same man: a historical Lula, on the verge of winning the presidency; a playful Lula, who spares no one with his jokes; and an actor Lula, aware that he was being filmed at a peculiar moment. And power always knows how to put on a good show."

Fernando de Barros e Silva, of the Folha de S.Paulo newspaper, wrote that: "Intermissions is far from being an official or quasi-official portrait of the PT campaign. Despite the director's unmistakable affection for the central character, the image of Lula that emerges from the film is controversial and, at the very least, ambiguous. Furthermore, the film sheds new light on much of what has transpired since then, during nearly two years of government.”

=== Prizes ===
Year	Award	Nominee(s)	Category	Venue	Result	Ref.
2005	Guarani Brazilian Film Award	João Moreira Salles	Best Documentary	There will be no awards ceremony	Nominee	
2005	Guarani Brazilian Film Award	Intermissions	Best Documentary	There will be no awards ceremony	Nominee	
2005	Prêmio ACIE de Cinema	Intermissions	Best Documentary	Banco do Brasil Cultural Center, Rio de Janeiro, Rio de Janeiro, Brazil	Won	
2005	Brazilian Academy Film Awards	João Moreira Salles	Best Director	Marina da Glória, Rio de Janeiro, Rio de Janeiro, Brazil	Nominee	
2005	Brazilian Academy Film Awards	Intermissions	Best Documentary Feature Film	Marina da Glória, Rio de Janeiro, Rio de Janeiro, Brazil	Nominee	

== Legacy ==
In the wake of the Mensalão scandal, journalist Laura Mattos wrote in the Folha de S. Paulo newspaper that the film had taken on a new tone. "Before, it was just a documentary about the behind-the-scenes of Lula’s presidential campaign. The day before yesterday, at its re-release at the Sala Cinemateca, João Moreira Salles’s film became a detective game for viewers searching for “clues” regarding allegations of government corruption. For those who had already seen the film before the crisis (BC), it was clear that now, after the crisis (AC), Intermissions is a “different film.” After receiving the DVD, journalist Barbara Gancia wrote a negative review of the film in Folha de S. Paulo in 2006, gave the film a negative review stating that the editing is “microsurgery in its precision, cutting with a sharp scalpel every scene in which Luiz Inácio Lula da Silva, known for his short temper, begins to lose patience with something, ultimately transforming what was intended to be a behind-the-scenes account of a presidential campaign into a ‘coitus interruptus". The journalist also stated, “It’s a declaration of love for Lula. Yes, all the PT members who later fell from grace are there".

In 2017, the film was selected for the list of Brazil’s 100 best documentaries, compiled by the Brazilian Association of Film Critics (Abraccine). João Moreira Salles's feature film ranked 25th. Two other films by the director are mentioned on the list: News from a Personal War with Kátia Lund and Santiago, both of which ranked higher than Intermissions.

== Credits ==
The following people worked on the production of the documentary:

- João Moreira Salles: director;
- Maurício Andrade Ramos: executive producer;
- Raquel Freire Zangrandi: production manager;
- Walter Carvalho: director of photography;
- Heron de Alencar: sound;
- Aloysio Compasso: sound;
- Alexandre Sagesse: pre-editor;
- Felipe Lacerda: final editor;
- Denilson Campos: sound editing and mixing.
