= Santiago (2007 film) =

2007 film by João Moreira Salles

- Directed by: João Moreira Salles
- Written by: João Moreira Salles
- Produced by: Maurício Andrade Ramos
- Cinematography: Walter Carvalho
- Edited by: Eduardo Escorel; Lívia Serpa
- Release date: 2007
- Running time: 80 minutes
- Country: Brazil
- Language: Portuguese

Santiago is a 2007 Brazilian documentary film by João Moreira Salles, about Santiago Badariotti Merlo (1912-1994), a butler who worked for the filmmaker's family for 30 years.

In the 2010s it was ranked as number 33 on the Abraccine Top 100 Brazilian films list and also number 3 in the documentary list.

== Plot ==
In 1992, João Moreira Salles filmed his Argentinean butler Santiago Badariotti Merlo, who was born in 1912 and had worked between 1956 and 1986 for the filmmaker family in the huge house of their own in Rio de Janeiro. Two years later, Santiago died and, for some strange reason, Moreira Salles felt he couldn't edit the film and put it aside. In 2005, the filmmaker remembers the unfinished film and decided to start its material.

== Promotion ==
Santiago had its worldwide premiere at the Cinéma du Réel Film Festival (Paris), in March 2007. The film won the Grand Prix Award for Best Documentary.

In April 2007, the film was also screened at the It's All True – International Documentary Film Festival (São Paulo) and made subsequent appearances in the Official Selection in some international film festivals, such as the Alba Film Festival (Italy), Encuentro Latinoamericano de Cine (Peru), Tribeca Film Festival (United States), Thessaloniki Documentary Festival (Greece), Hot Docs Documentary Festival (Canada), Miami Film Festival (United States), among others.

== Accolades ==
List of awards and nominations
Award	Date of ceremony	Category	Recipient(s) and nominee(s)	Result	Ref.
Cinéma du Réel	2007	Best Documentary	Santiago	Won	
Alba International Film Festival	2007	Best Film (according to popular vote at the AIFF)	Santiago	Won	
Encuentro Latinoamericano de Cine de Lima	2007	Best Documentary	Santiago	Won	
Miami International Film Festival	2008	Best Documentary	Santiago	Won	
