= Adão =

Adão, a Portuguese variant of Adam, is both a surname and a given name. Notable people with the name include:

Surname:

- Adão (born 1960), Portuguese footballer
- Cláudio Adão (born 1955), Brazilian footballer
- Eurípedes Amoreirinha, full name Eurípedes Adão Amoreirinha, (born 1984) Portuguese footballer
- Felipe Adão (born 1985), Brazilian footballer
- Joaquim Adão (born 1992), Angolan footballer

Given name:

- Adão Dãxalebaradã (1955–2004), Brazilian singer and actor
- Adão Nunes Dornelles, a.k.a. Adãozinho, Brazilian footballer
- Adão Iturrusgarai (born 1965), Brazilian cartoonist
- Adão Pretto (born 1945), Brazilian politician

== See also ==
- Adão, parish in Guarda Municipality, Portugal
- Adão e Eva, 1995 Portuguese film
