= News from a Personal War =

- Directed by: João Moreira Salles; Kátia Lund
- Written by: Joao Moreira Salles; Kátia Lund
- Produced by: Raquel Freire Zangrandi
- Cinematography: Walter Carvalho
- Edited by: Flavio Nunes
- Release date: 1999
- Running time: 57 minutes
- Country: Brazil
- Language: Portuguese

News from a Personal War is a 1999 Brazilian documentary film by João Moreira Salles and Kátia Lund, about the urban violence-ridden slums in Rio de Janeiro.

== Plot ==
Based on interviews with characters involved in the trafficking routine, the film contrasts the lines of criminals, police and residents of the Santa Marta favela in a daily war that knows no winners, and debates the way society deals with violence.

== Cast ==
- Nilton Cerqueira - Self
- Carlos Luis Gregório - Self
- Paulo Lins - Self
- Hélio Luz - Self
- Rodrigo Pimentel - Self
- Itamar Silva - Self

== Promotion ==
News from a Personal War had its premiere on a Brazilian pay television channel in 14 of April 1999. In the following year, it was included in the Official Selection at the São Paulo It's All True – International Documentary Film Festival and won the prize for Best Documentary (Brazilian Competition Award).

The film made subsequent appearances at the Amsterdam International Documentary Film Festival, San Francisco Independent Film Festival and Vancouver International Film Festival, all these screened in 2002.

== Accolades ==
List of awards and nominations
Award	Date of ceremony	Category	Recipient(s) and nominee(s)	Result	Ref.
It's All True – International Documentary Film Festival	2000	Best Documentary (Brazilian Competition Award)	Notícias de Uma Guerra Particular	Won	
