= Jorge Horacio Brito =

Argentine banker and businessman (1952–2020)

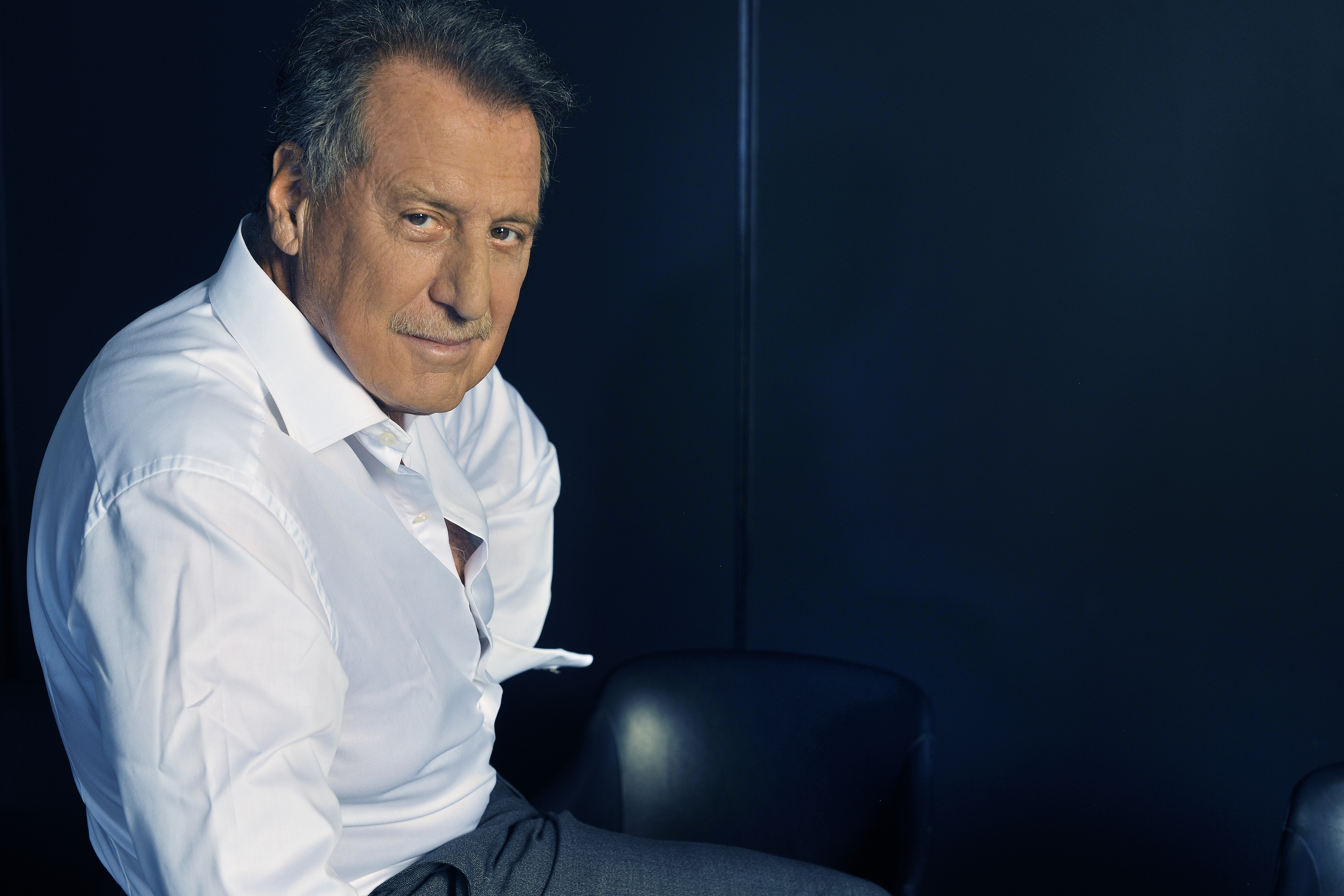
- Born: July 23, 1952; Buenos Aires, Argentina
- Died: November 20, 2020 (aged 68); Salta Province, Argentina
- Occupations: Banker, businessman
- Known for: Founder and CEO of Banco Macro; former president and chairman of ADEBA
- Spouse: Marcela Carballo

Jorge Horacio Brito (23 July 1952 – 20 November 2020) was an Argentine banker and businessman. He was born in Buenos Aires, Argentina.

He was one of the main shareholders and the CEO of Argentina's largest bank, Banco Macro. He held this position until 2018, and returned to the role in 2020. He also served as president and chairman of the Argentine Banking Association (ADEBA) from 2003 to 2016.

Brito owned approximately one-sixth of Banco Macro’s shares. His investments spanned real estate (through the firm Vizora), agriculture and livestock (through Inversora Juramento S.A., Frigorífico Bermejo and Cabaña Juramento), and the energy sector through Genneia S.A.

In 2016, he received the Fortuna Lifetime Achievement Award for his contributions to the Argentine business community.

In 2017, Forbes ranked him 1,567th on its global list of billionaires, making him the seventh richest person in Argentina at the time.

In 2018, Forbes placed his net worth at US$1.3 billion on The World's Billionaires list, ranking him tenth in Argentina with an estimated fortune of US$1.5 billion. In 2019, he fell to 21st place with an estimated net worth of US$690 million.

Brito died in a helicopter crash on November 20, 2020, while traveling in Salta Province, Argentina.

== Early life ==
Jorge Horacio Brito was born to an upper-class family in Buenos Aires in 1952. After the death of his father in 1962, he was raised by his mother.

== Career ==
=== Banking and finance ===
He founded Anglia, a brokerage firm, in 1976, together with his partner Jorge Ezequiel Delfín Carballo, using an initial loan of $10,000 provided by his mother. In 1976, he also created Macro Compañía Financiera S.A., which operated alongside the consulting firm Econométrica, whose members included José María Dagnino Pastore, Mario Brodersohn, Alieto Guadagni and Alfredo Concepción.

In the mid-1980s, Brito and his partners acquired a competing brokerage, Financiera Macro, forming Macro Bank (Banco Macro). One of its owners was Brodersohn, then Secretary of the Treasury under President Raúl Alfonsín. He was named chairman of the board of directors in June 1988, after receiving authorization from the Central Bank of Argentina to operate as Banco Macro.

Macro Bank grew steadily with the acquisition of numerous provincial banks privatized during the 1990s, including Banco de Salta, Banco de Misiones, Banco del Noroeste, Banco de Jujuy, and Banco de Tucumán S.A.

After the 2001 crisis, between 2002 and 2010, Brito expanded further through acquisitions including Bansud, 35% of Scotiabank Argentina, Nuevo Banco Suquía, Banco Empresario de Tucumán, Nuevo Banco Bisel, Banco de Tucumán, and Banco Privado de Inversiones. The Banco Macro holding came to include Macro Securities S.A., Macro Fiducia S.A., Banco Privado de Inversiones S.A., and Macro Fondos S.A., among other entities. Macro Bank grew to become one of the largest private banks in Argentina. Brito also opened an offshore branch of the bank in the Bahamas, known as Macro Bank Limited.

Brito was the chairman of Macro Bank's board of directors, its chief executive officer, and a member of its executive and senior credit committees.

Brito became chairman of the Argentine Banking Association (ADEBA) on April 8, 2003, and held this position until 2016, when he took a leave of absence and was succeeded by Daniel Llambías. In 2017, this position was taken by his son Jorge Pablo Brito.

Between 2012 and 2014, Brito served as president of the Latin American Federation of Banks (FELABAN), a non-profit organization aimed at promoting cooperation among financial institutions in Latin America.

=== Real estate ===
Brito invested in real estate through Vizora Developers, a company operating in several countries in Latin America. Its core business is real estate development and marketing, and it has been actively engaged in the development of the district of Puerto Madero in Buenos Aires.

Among its projects in Puerto Madero are Link Towers, Madero Walk, Madero Walk Eventos and Zen City. The company also developed Remeros Beach in Tigre.

Brito similarly invested in other real estate developments across Argentina, including Central Tucumano in San Miguel de Tucumán and the Arboris residential projects in Las Lomas and La Horqueta, in San Isidro.

He also developed the Macro Tower building in Catalinas Norte, Buenos Aires, which serves as the headquarters of Banco Macro.

Macro Bank also participated in the construction of Madero Center, a luxury mixed-use development located in Puerto Madero.

=== Agriculture and livestock ===
Brito's farming and cattle-raising investments involved cattle breeding, meat industrialization, and agricultural commodities, mainly soybeans. Inversora Juramento S.A. was responsible for cattle breeding operations, while Frigoríficos Bermejo S.A. carried out industrial slaughtering and meat processing that reached consumers through the Cabaña Juramento S.A. chain of butcher shops, which operated retail stores and online delivery services.

Inversora Juramento S.A., founded in 1990, is one of the leading agricultural and cattle-raising companies in northern Argentina. The company is headquartered in Joaquín V. González, Salta Province, and owns 87,414 hectares of land, of which approximately 56,000 hectares are devoted to pastures and the cultivation of soybeans, sorghum, alfalfa, and maize.

Its core activity is the production and commercialization of beef. The company maintains approximately 54,000 head of cattle and allocates around 67,000 hectares to beef production. In addition, the company cultivates approximately 12,600 hectares annually, including around 8,000 hectares of soybeans, as well as sorghum, alfalfa, and corn used primarily as cattle feed.

Frigoríficos Bermejo S.A. is a meat-processing and cold-storage facility located in Pichanal, Salta. The plant has the capacity to slaughter up to 10,000 head of cattle per month. Its wholesale and retail operations are conducted primarily in Salta and Jujuy through company-owned butcher shops and sales teams. The company also exported beef products to Chile and the European Union.

=== Energy ===
Jorge Brito owned Genneia S.A., a company that produces energy through various subsidiaries. For wind power generation, the company operates the Rawson I and Rawson II wind farms, Madryn Norte, Madryn Sur, Madryn Oeste, Villalonga, Chubut Norte, and Pomona I. It also operates the Paraná Thermal Power Plant (Entre Ríos), the San Lorenzo Thermal Power Plant, and the Bragado Thermal Power Plant, as well as plants in Matheu, Olavarría, Las Armas, Paraná, and Concepción del Uruguay, and in Río Mayo and Gobernador Costa (Chubut Province).

He also served as chairman of the board of directors of Argentine oil company YPF. In 2007, Brito was among those who expressed interest in acquiring the 20% stake that Madrid-based Repsol held in the state-owned company when those shares were put up for sale.

== Personal life ==
Brito married Marcela Carballo and had six children. He and his pilot died in a helicopter accident in Cabra Corral, in the province of Salta, on November 20, 2020. He was 68.
