= 2004 in Brazil =

Events from the year 2004 in Brazil.

== Incumbents ==
=== Federal government ===
- President: Luiz Inácio Lula da Silva
- Vice President: José Alencar

=== Governors ===
- Acre: Jorge Viana
- Alagoas: Ronaldo Lessa
- Amapa: Waldez Góes
- Amazonas: Eduardo Braga
- Bahia: Paulo Souto
- Ceará: Lúcio Alcântara
- Espírito Santo: Paulo Hartung
- Goiás: Marconi Perillo
- Maranhão: José Reinaldo Tavares
- Mato Grosso: Blairo Maggi
- Mato Grosso do Sul: José Orcírio Miranda dos Santos
- Minas Gerais: Aécio Neves
- Pará: Simão Jatene
- Paraíba: Cássio Cunha Lima
- Paraná: Roberto Requião de Mello e Silva
- Pernambuco: Jarbas Vasconcelos
- Piauí: Wellington Dias
- Rio de Janeiro: Rosinha Garotinho
- Rio Grande do Norte: Wilma Maria de Faria
- Rio Grande do Sul: Germano Rigotto
- Rondônia: Ivo Narciso Cassol
- Roraima:
  - Francisco Flamarion Portela (until 10 November)
  - Ottomar de Sousa Pinto (from 10 November)
- Santa Catarina: Luiz Henrique da Silveira
- São Paulo: Geraldo Alckmin
- Sergipe: João Filho
- Tocantins: Marcelo Miranda

=== Vice governors ===
- Acre: Arnóbio Marques de Almeida Júnior
- Alagoas: Luís Abílio de Sousa Neto
- Amapá: Pedro Paulo Dias de Carvalho
- Amazonas: Omar José Abdel Aziz
- Bahia: Eraldo Tinoco Melo
- Ceará: Francisco de Queiroz Maia Júnior
- Espírito Santo: Wellington Coimbra
- Goiás: Alcides Rodrigues Filho
- Maranhão: Jurandir Ferro do Lago Filho
- Mato Grosso: Iraci Araújo Moreira
- Mato Grosso do Sul: Egon Krakheche
- Minas Gerais: Clésio Soares de Andrade
- Pará: Valéria Pires Franco
- Paraíba: Lauremília Lucena
- Paraná: Orlando Pessuti
- Pernambuco: José Mendonça Bezerra Filho
- Piauí: Osmar Ribeiro de Almeida Júnior
- Rio de Janeiro: Luiz Paulo Conde
- Rio Grande do Norte: Antônio Jácome
- Rio Grande do Sul: Antônio Carlos Hohlfeldt
- Rondônia: Odaísa Fernandes Ferreira
- Roraima:
  - Salomão Afonso de Souza Cruz (until 10 November)
  - Erci de Moraes (from 10 November)
- Santa Catarina: Eduardo Pinho Moreira
- São Paulo: Claudio Lembo
- Sergipe: Marília Mandarino
- Tocantins: Raimundo Nonato Pires dos Santos

== Events ==
- Date Unknown
  - The Copa Petrobras São Paulo tennis tournament is established.
  - Tour do Brasil is established

=== March ===
- March 28: Hurricane Catarina hits the states of Santa Catarina and Rio Grande do Sul, leaving 2 dead and over 60 injured. This would be the first hurricane-strength tropical cyclone ever recorded in the Southern Atlantic Ocean.

=== April ===
- April 15: President Luiz Inácio Lula da Silva signs a law creating the National Student Performance Examination; a written test, administered annually, used to evaluate Brazilian higher education courses.

=== May ===
- May 19: In three states and the Federal District, 14 are arrested by The Federal Police, after being accused of fraud in the purchase of medicines, primarily in the area of blood products for the Ministry of Health. This would be known as Operation Vampire.

=== July ===
- July 25: Brazil defeats Argentina 4-2 in penalties, to win their seventh Copa America trophy.

=== August ===
- August 3: The Superior Electoral Court revokes the mandate of the governor of Roraima, Francisco Flamarion Portela, who is accused of committing irregularities in the 2002 general elections in the so-called Operation Gafanhoto.

=== Football clubs founded ===
- January 1 – Sociedade Esportiva Recreativa Panambi
- January 19 – Esporte Clube Tigres do Brasil
- January 24 – Luverdense Esporte Clube
- February 10 – Toledo Colônia Work
- February 17 – Osvaldo Cruz Futebol Clube
- March 27 – Horizonte Futebol Clube
- April 10 – Villa Rio Esporte Clube
- May 25 – Guanabara Esporte Clube
- June 10 – Paulínia FC
- July 14 – Clube Esportivo Guará
- November 11 – São Domingos Futebol Clube
- November 15 – Barras Futebol Club
- November 25 – São Carlos Futebol Clube
- December 20 – São Bernardo Futebol Clube

== Culture ==
=== Films ===
- See List of Brazilian films of 2004

=== Literature ===
- Cristóvão Tezza – O Fotógrafo

=== Music ===
- Vinicius Cantuária – Horse and Fish
- Ithamara Koorax – Cry me a River

== Births ==
- May 3
  - Mel Maia, actress
  - Andrey Santos, footballer

== Deaths ==
=== January ===
- January 9: Rogério Sganzerla, filmmaker (born 1946)
- January 20: Adão Dãxalebaradã, singer (born 1955)

=== June ===
- June 21: Leonel Brizola, politician (born 1922)

=== July ===
- July 19: Carvalho Leite, footballer (born 1912)

=== September ===
- September 7: Miriam Pires, actress (born 1926)

=== November ===
- November 8: Sérgio Hingst, actor (born 1924)
- November 20: Celso Furtado, economist (born 1920)

== See also ==
- 2004 in Brazilian football
- 2004 in Brazilian television
- List of Brazilian films of 2004
