= Banco Itaú Argentina =

Bank of Argentina

Banco Itaú Argentina S.A.
- Type: Subsidiary
- Industry: Finance and Insurance
- Founded: 1998; 28 years ago
- Defunct: November 4, 2023
- Fate: Renamed to Macro BMA
- Headquarters: Buenos Aires, Argentina
- Products: Banking; Insurance; Private Bank
- Revenue: ▲US$ 296.7 million (2012)
- Net income: ▲US$ 22.4 million (2012)
- Total assets: ▼US$ 2.0 billion (2012)
- Number of employees: 1,650
- Website: www.itau.com.ar (archived)

Banco Itaú Argentina was an Argentine bank owned by the Brazilian bank Itaú Unibanco. The bank was acquired by Banco Macro on November 3, 2023. It was founded in 1998 after the purchase of Banco del Buen Ayre. The bank had 99 bank branches and 140 ATMs across the country and more than 400,000 customers.
