= Banco Nacional =

Brazilian bank (1944–1995)

Banco Nacional S.A.
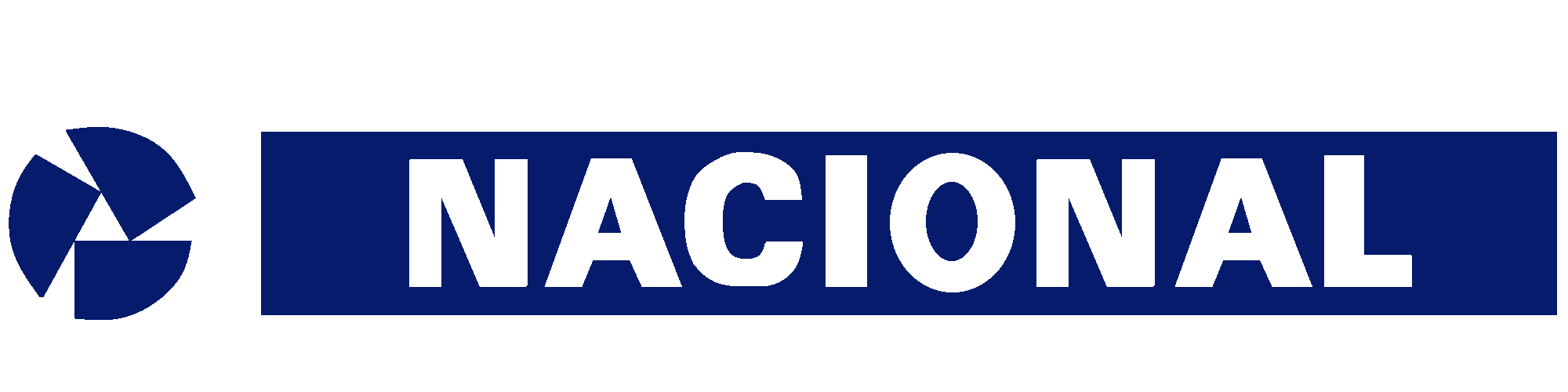
- Industry: Finance and Insurance
- Founded: 1944
- Founder: Magalhães Pinto Valdomiro de Magalhães Pinto
- Defunct: 1995
- Headquarters: Belo Horizonte, Brazil
- Products: Banking
- Parent: Unibanco

Banco Nacional was a bank from Brazil. It was taken over by Unibanco in 1995.

The Nacional brand is better known as main sponsor of Ayrton Senna during all his racing career in Formula One (1984-1994).

The TV Globo's popular news program Jornal Nacional was originally had the bank as the main sponsor.

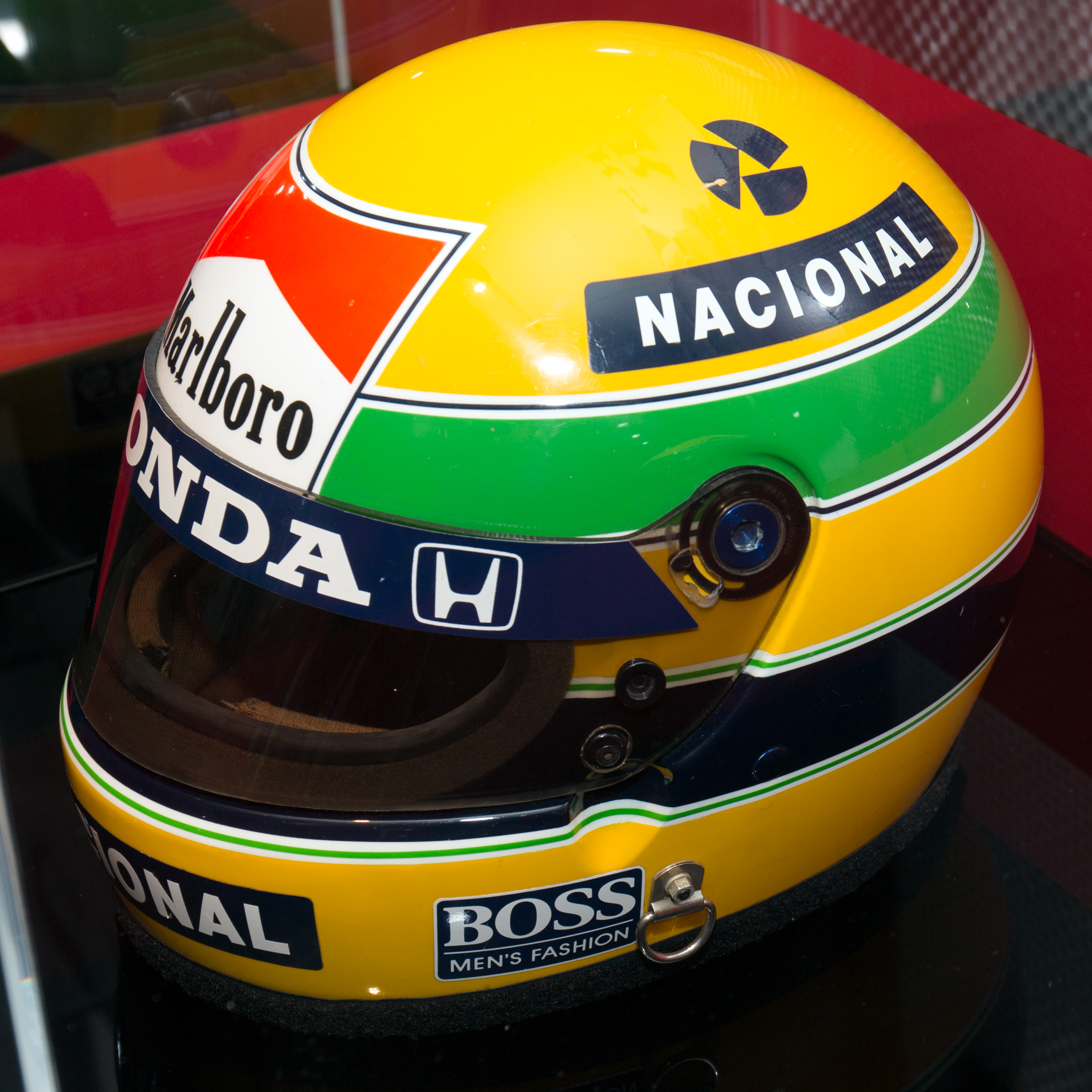
Ayrton Senna's helmet model from 1988.
