= Poços de Caldas Airport =

Airport serving Poço de Caldas, Brazil

Emb. Walther Moreira Salles Airport Aeroporto Emb. Walther Moreira Salles
- IATA: POO; ICAO: SBPC; LID: MG0018

Summary
- Airport type: Public
- Operator: Infraero (2022–present)
- Serves: Poços de Caldas
- Time zone: BRT (UTC−03:00)
- Elevation AMSL: 1,261 m (4,137 ft)
- Coordinates: 21°50′33″S 046°34′10″W
- Website: www4.infraero.gov.br/aeroporto-pocos-de-caldas/

Map
- Location in Brazil POO (Brazil)

Runways
| Direction | Length | | Surface |
| Direction | m | ft | Surface |
|---|---|---|---|
| 09/27 | 1,515 | 4,970 | Asphalt |

Statistics (2025)
- Passengers: 4,132 ▲150%
- Aircraft Operations: 1,683 ▲30%
- Metric tonnes of cargo: 0
- Statistics: Infraero; Sources: Airport Website, ANAC, DECEA

Embaixador Walther Moreira Salles Airport (IATA: POO, ICAO: SBPC) is the airport serving Poços de Caldas, Brazil. It is named after Walter Moreira Salles, a banker and philanthropist.

It is managed by contract by Infraero.

== History ==
The airport was opened in 1937.

On October 20, 2022, the Municipality of Poços de Caldas signed a contract of operation with Infraero.

== Access ==
The airport is located 8 km (5 mi) from downtown Poços de Caldas.

== See also ==
- List of airports in Brazil
