= Banco Itaú Paraguay =

Bank of Paraguay

Banco Itaú Paraguay S.A.
- Type: Subsidiary
- Industry: Finance and Insurance
- Founded: 1978
- Headquarters: Asunción, Paraguay
- Key people: Jose Britez Infante, (CEO)
- Products: Banking; Insurance
- Revenue: ▲US$ 226.8 million (2018)
- Net income: ▲US$ 116 million (2018)
- Total assets: ▲US$ 3.3 billion (2018)
- Number of employees: 847 (2018)
- Parent: Itaú Unibanco
- Website: www.itau.com.py

Banco Itau Paraguay S.A. was founded in 1978 as Interbanco SA. property of National Bank of Brazil. In 1995 was acquired by Unibanco Group. As a result of the merger between Unibanco and Banco Itaú in 2008, was renamed Banco Itaú Paraguay S.A in 2010. Itau is considered the biggest bank in Paraguay. Jose Britez Infante assumed as CEO in late 2020 replacing Brazilian Andre Gailey, it is the first time a Paraguayan holds this position.
