= Walter Moreira Salles =

Brazilian banker, politician and philanthropist

- Salles in 1962

Minister of Finance
- In office 8 September 1961 – 14 September 1962
- President: João Goulart
- Preceded by: Clemente Mariani
- Succeeded by: Miguel Calmon du Pin

Ambassador of Brazil to the United States
- In office 10 July 1959 – 16 February 1960
- Nominated by: Juscelino Kubitschek
- Preceded by: Amaral Peixoto
- Succeeded by: Roberto Campos
- In office 3 June 1952 – 18 August 1953
- Nominated by: Getúlio Vargas
- Preceded by: Maurício Nabuco
- Succeeded by: João Carlos Muniz

Executive Director of the Superintendency of Currency and Credit
- In office 22 February 1951 – 8 May 1952
- President: Getúlio Vargas
- Preceded by: Renato Pereira dos Santos
- Succeeded by: José Soares Maciel Filho

Personal details
- Born: 28 May 1912 Pouso Alegre, Minas Gerais, Brazil
- Died: 27 February 2001 (aged 88) Petrópolis, Rio de Janeiro, Brazil
- Children: Walter Salles Júnior, João Moreira Salles, Pedro Moreira Salles
- Occupation: Politician

Walter Moreira Salles, also Walther Moreira Salles (28 May 1912 – 27 February 2001), was a Brazilian banker, politician and philanthropist, considered as one of the founders of the modern Brazilian banking industry.

== Career ==
Moreira Salles was born in 1912 in Pouso Alegre, Minas Gerais. He graduated from the Faculty of Law of Largo de São Francisco at the University of São Paulo. In 1926, his father, João Moreira Salles, founded Casa Bancária Moreira Salles in the city of Poços de Caldas, approximately 80 km (50 mi) northwest of Pouso Alegre. Walter Moreira Salles joined the family business as an acting partner in 1933, at the age of 21.

In 1940, Banco Moreira Salles merged with three regional banks, a process that ultimately resulted in the creation of União de Bancos Brasileiros (Unibanco). During his leadership, Moreira Salles pursued a strategy of acquisitions while placing particular emphasis on the development of the institution's workforce, contributing to Unibanco's emergence as one of Brazil's three largest private banks. After six decades with the institution, he stepped down as chairman of the board in 1991 and assumed the position of honorary chairman, dedicating his efforts primarily to the group's cultural initiatives.

Between 1990 and 1991, Moreira Salles established the Moreira Salles Institute (IMS), a nonprofit organization devoted to the promotion of cultural activities in the fields of photography, literature, libraries, visual arts and Brazilian music. He served as the institute's first president. In 1992, IMS inaugurated the Casa de Cultura de Poços de Caldas, located in the city where Casa Bancária Moreira Salles had originally been founded. The institute subsequently expanded its activities and now operates cultural centres in Rio de Janeiro, São Paulo, Poços de Caldas and Belo Horizonte, as well as galleries in São Paulo, Rio de Janeiro, Curitiba and Porto Alegre.

Poços de Caldas Airport was named in his honour.

=== Political involvement ===
Moreira Salles was also involved in Brazilian politics. He was the country's ambassador to the United States in the 1950s, serving in Washington D.C. twice during the decade. He was Secretary of the Treasury in the cabinet of João Goulart, and gained the favour of President Juscelino Kubitschek for his work as a conciliator in his diplomatic incursions. In the 1950s he helped negotiate the growing problem of Brazil's external debt on three occasions, during the governments of Getúlio Vargas, Kubitschek and Jânio Quadros.

== Personal and family life ==
Moreira Salles had many celebrity friends, including the rock musician Mick Jagger, Brazilian President Fernando Henrique Cardoso, and the actress Greta Garbo. Moreira Salles died in 2001, at Araras, in the district of Petrópolis, in Rio, of causes not disclosed by his family.

His four sons are Pedro Moreira Salles, current president of Unibanco; filmmaker Walter Salles; documentarian João Moreira Salles; publisher Fernando Moreira Salles.

Salles was married three times, to Helène Matarazzo, the mother of Fernando, whom he divorced at the age of 28; Eliza Gonçalves, the mother of Pedro, Walter and João, and his wife until the early 1970s; and Lúcia, whom he married in 1986.

Political offices
Preceded by Clemente Mariani	Minister of Finance; 1961–1962	Succeeded by Miguel Calmon du Pin
