= In the Intense Now =

2017 film directed by João Moreira Salles

In the Intense Now (Portuguese: No Intenso Agora) is a 2017 Brazilian documentary film directed and narrated by João Moreira Salles. The film explores the political and emotional climate of the 1960s, focusing on the events of May 1968 in France, the military coup in Brazil (1964), the Cultural Revolution in China, and the Soviet invasion of Czechoslovakia (1968). Combining archival footage with personal narration, Salles reflects on the transient nature of revolutionary fervor and the contrast between public history and private memory. The documentary premiered at the 2017 Berlin International Film Festival.
