= Banco Macro =

Argentine bank

Banco Macro S.A.
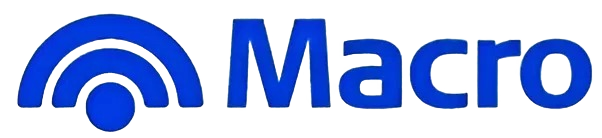

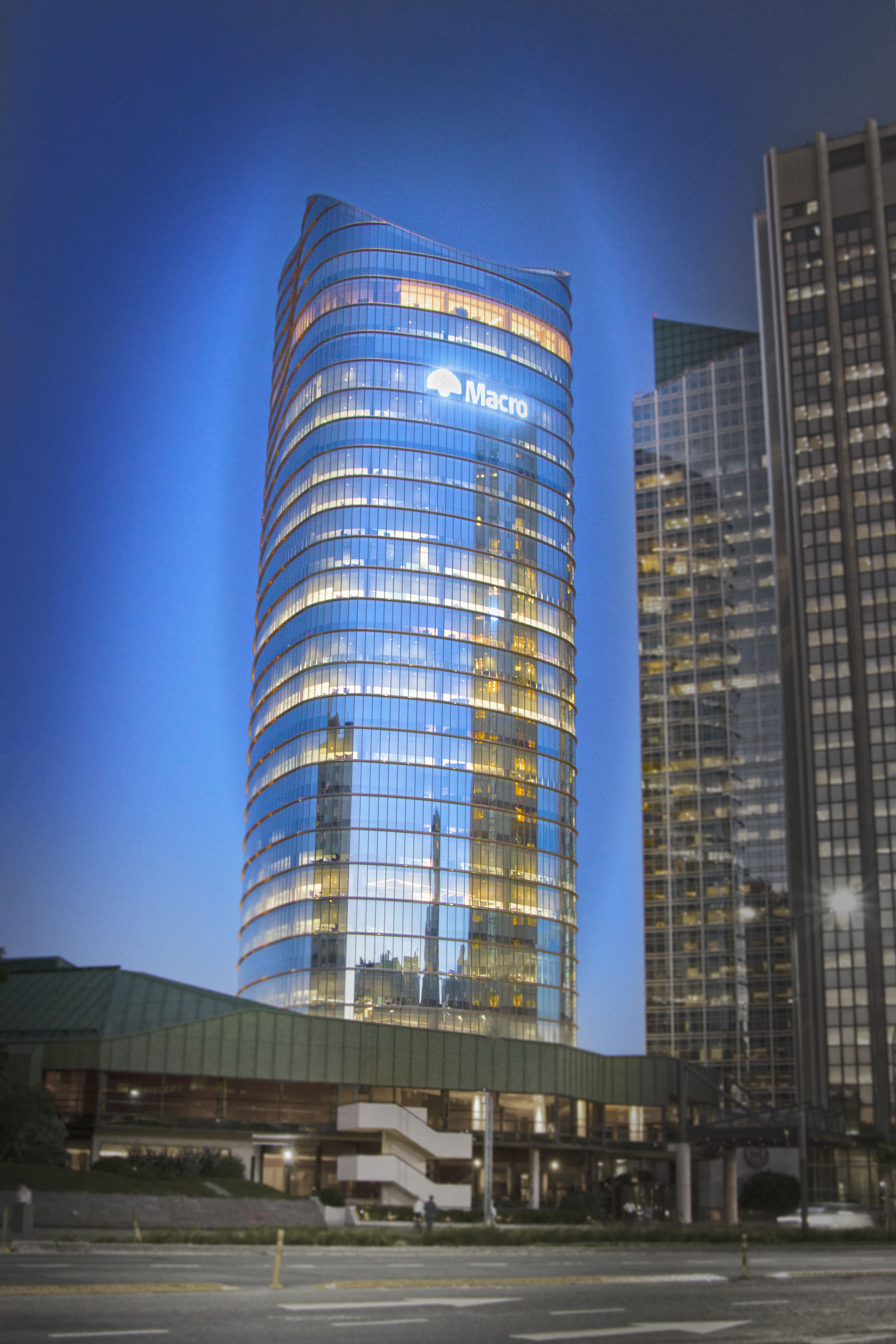
- Macro Tower in Buenos Aires, 2019
- Formerly: Banco Tucumán
- Type: Sociedad Anónima
- Traded as: BCBA: BMA; NYSE: BMA; MERVAL component
- Industry: Financial services
- Founded: 1976; 50 years ago
- Founder: Mario Brodersohn, José María Dagnino Pastore, Alieto Guadagni
- Headquarters: Buenos Aires, Argentina
- Key people: Delfin Jorge Ezequiel Carballo (Chairman); Juan Martín Parma (CEO)
- Products: Retail Banking; Investments; Mortgages; Consumer Finance; Credit cards
- Revenue: ▲US$1.1 billion (2012)
- Net income: ▲US$304.0 million (2012)
- Total assets: ▲US$9.8 billion (2012)
- Owners: Jorge Horacio Brito (16,59%); ANSES (27,49%); Delfín Jorge Ezequiel Carballo (5,68%); Julian Aristiqui (15,78%)
- Number of employees: 7,268
- Divisions: List: Banco del Tucumán S.A.; Macro Bank Limited; Macro Securities SA; Macro Fiducia SA; Macro Fondos SGFCISA; Macro BMA
- Website: macro.com.ar

Banco Macro is the second largest domestically-owned private bank in Argentina, and the sixth-largest by deposits and lending. It began operating in 1988 as a bank and has a wide network of branches and ATMs throughout the country, which allows it to provide banking services to a broad customer base.

"Grupo Macro" has 7,925 employees, 1,772 ATMs, 957 self-service terminals, and a structure of more than 500 service points.

== Overview ==
Banco Macro began operations as Financiera Macro, a brokerage specializing in arbitrage founded by Mario Brodersohn, José Dagnino Pastore and Alieto Guadagni, in 1976. The institution was purchased by a competing arbitrageur, Jorge Brito, in 1985. Granted authorization to operate as a commercial bank by the Central Bank of Argentina in 1988, Banco Macro operated as a wholesale bank until 1995, becoming a pioneer in the Argentine corporate bonds market. During this interim, its business revolved around money market investments, trading of government and corporate bonds and financial services for medium and larger companies.

Macro acquired capital stock in numerous privatized provincial banks during 1996: Banco Misiones (93%), Banco Salta (98%) and Banco Jujuy (100%). It later acquired Banco Noroeste C.L. and participated in the restructuring of a number of struggling, private-sector and cooperative banks: Almafuerte Coop. Ltdo., Mayo S.A., Israelita de Córdoba S.A. and Mendoza S.A. (increasing its presence in the northern and central areas of Argentina).

Macro purchased 60% of Banco Bansud in December 2001. This entity was a leader private bank in the southern part of Argentina, with significant background in its area of influence and a large branch network; but it had been adversely affected by that year's economic and financial crisis. Following the August 2002 purchase of Scotiabank Quilmes, Macro acquired the remaining shares of Banco Bansud and, in December 2004, it acquired Nuevo Banco Suquía S.A. - becoming the third-ranking private Argentine bank in terms of net assets, the fourth in terms of deposits and the fifth in terms of credit outstanding to the private sector.

Macro acquired Banco Empresario del Tucumán and Banco del Tucumán, in 2005. These two institutions were made a part of the Macro Group, maintaining Banco del Tucumán as financial agent for the province and incorporating the acquired bank's branches. Macro then acquired Nuevo Banco Bisel S.A., in 2006. Bisel's acquisition made Macro the largest private, domestically-owned bank in Argentina, with around 7,900 employees and 440 branches,. In March, 2006, the bank changed its corporate name from Macro Bansud to Macro, and was listed in the New York Stock Exchange (NYSE), becoming the first Argentine company to be listed abroad since 1997.

The merger with Nuevo Banco Suquía S.A. was completed in 2007. This further advanced Macro's presence in the interior provinces of Argentina, adding over 250 branches. Macro is the only Argentine bank to have enjoyed 28 consecutive quarters of net profit as of early 2009; in 2008, it earned a net, pre-tax income of US$288 million. The bank's credit outstanding totalled over US$3 billion in March 2009 and its deposits, over US$4.8 billion (making it the fifth-largest in Argentina).
