= Pedro Moreira Salles =

Chairman of Brazilian bank; Itaú Unibanco

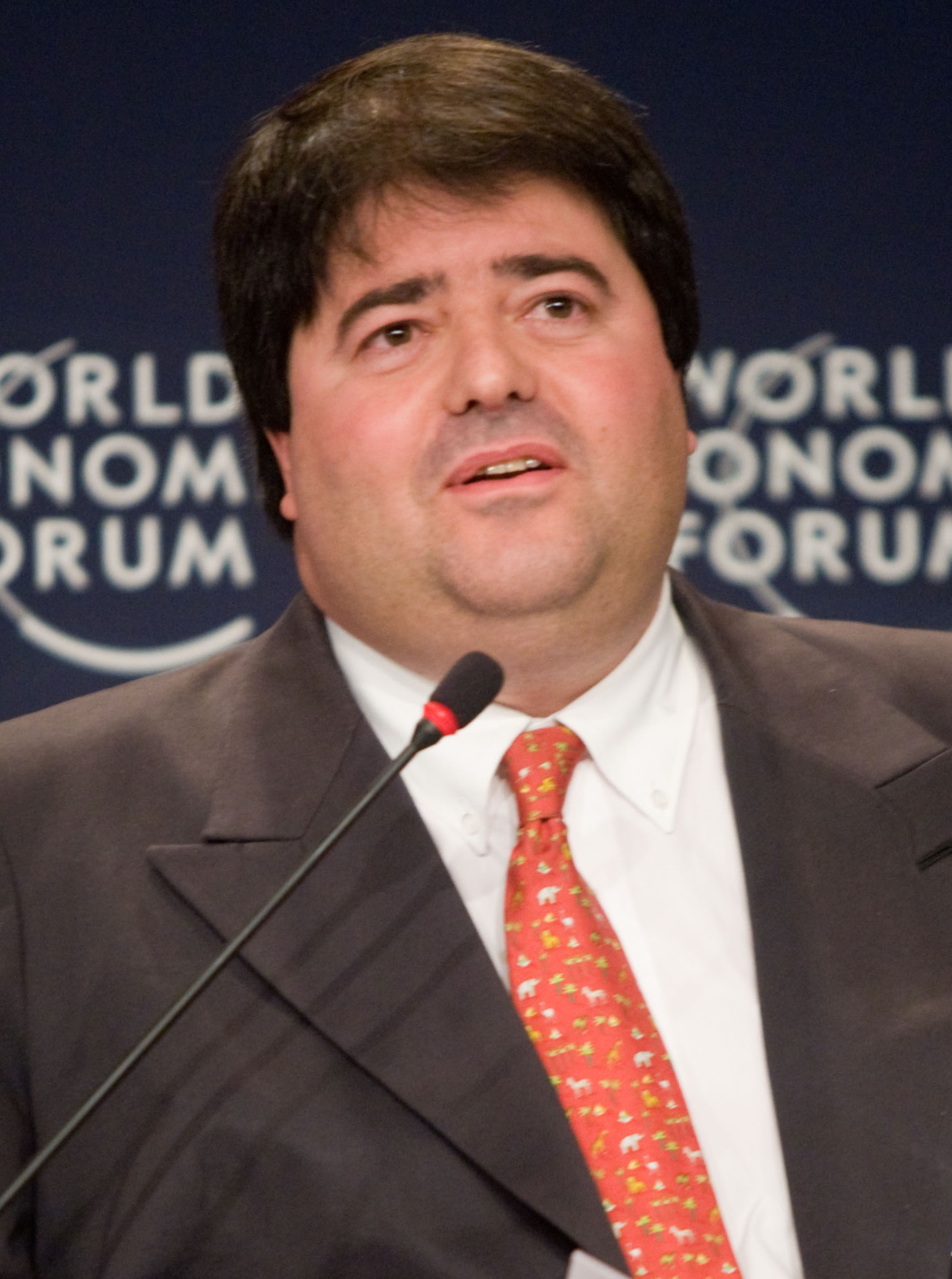
- Salles in 2009
- Born: 20 October 1959 (age 66)
- Education: University of California, Los Angeles
- Occupations: Businessman & Banker
- Known for: owning majority stake in CBMM
- Title: Chairman, Itaú Unibanco
- Spouse: Married
- Children: 2
- Parent: Walter Moreira Salles

Pedro Moreira Salles (born October 20, 1959) is a Brazilian billionaire businessman, banker, and the chairman of Itaú Unibanco, founded by his father Walter Moreira Salles, and the largest non-government banking institution in Brazil.

As of June 2026, he has a net worth of US$9 billion.

== Career ==
Salles has been unofficially involved with Unibanco since birth, since the bank was headed for several decades by his father, the late Walter Moreira Salles. Pedro joined Unibanco in 1989 and became chairman in 1997, after having been vice chairman for almost six years. In April 2004, Salles became CEO. As of 2016, he is chairman of Itaú Unibanco Holding.

Salles is a member of the Group of Fifty (G-50) - a non-profit initiative, composed of a Latin American executives and sponsored by the Carnegie Endowment for International Peace and the Inter-American Dialogue, in Washington D.C. He is a member of the advisory board of IBMEC, and vice-chairman of PlaNet Finance Brasil, a microcredit nongovernmental organization (NGO).

== Education ==
He holds a bachelor's degree in economics and history from the University of California, Los Angeles. He subsequently attended the graduate program in International Relations at Yale University and the Owner/President Management Program at Harvard University. Salles is married to Marisa Moreira Salles and has two children.

== Personal life ==
Pedro Moreira Salles has muscular dystrophy and is a wheelchair user. He says he copes with the disease with "a lot of psychotherapy," yet he lives a busy professional and social life. He and his wife support stem cell research. He is a brother of businessman Fernando Roberto Moreira Salles, documentarian João Moreira Salles and film director Walter Salles, of Oscar-winner "I'm Still Here" and Oscar-nominated Central Station.
