= Itaú (Chile) =

Chilean subsidiary of Brazilian banking institution

Itaú Chile S.A.

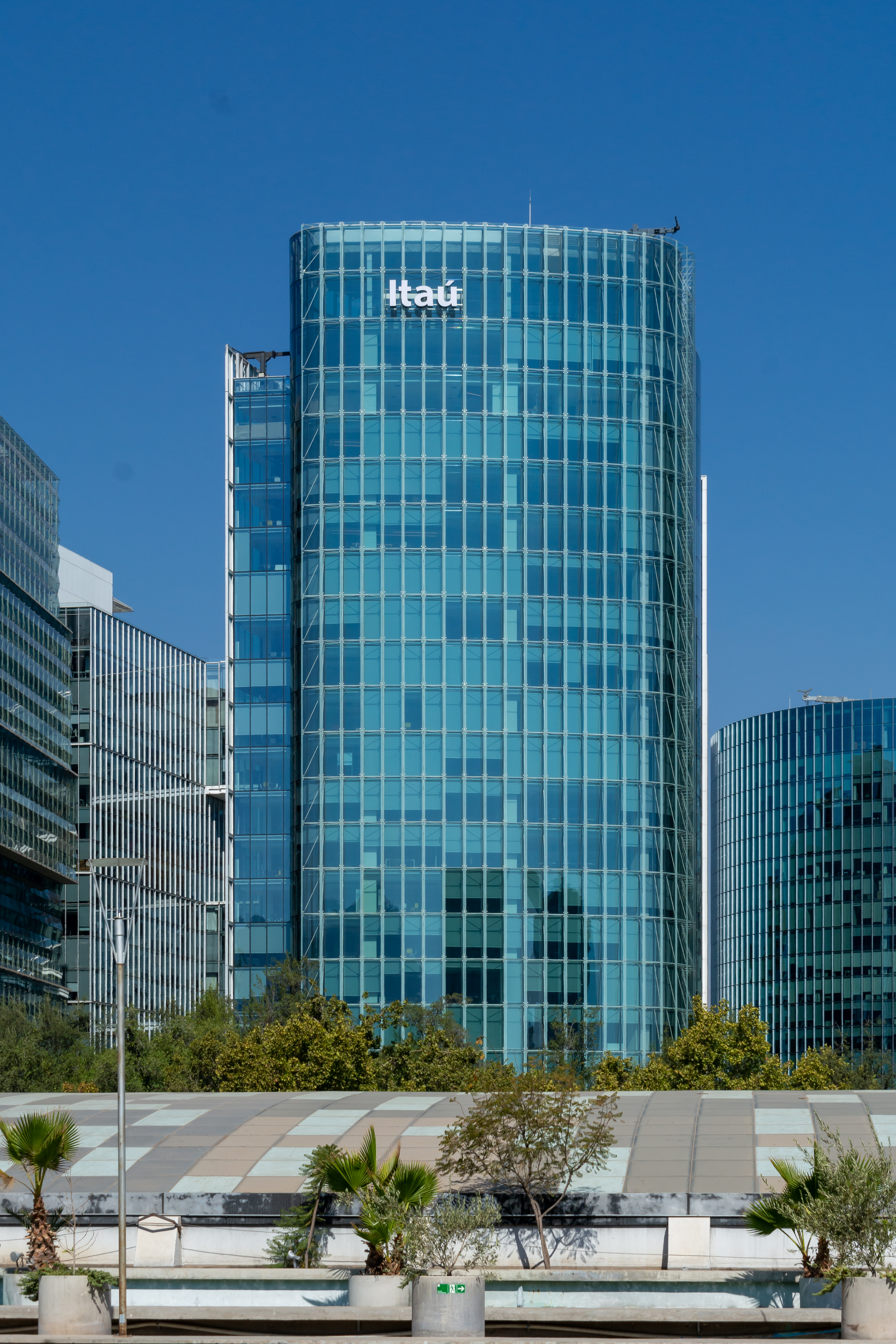
- Headquarters in Santiago de Chile.
- Company type: Sociedad Anónima
- Traded as: BCS: ITAUCL
- Industry: Banking
- Predecessor: Banco Itaú Chile
- Founded: 2001
- Headquarters: Santiago, Chile
- Key people: Jorge Saieh, (Chairman); Gabriel Moura, (CEO)
- Products: Commercial banking Retail banking Financial advisory Mutual fund management
- Revenue: ▲US$ 3.0 billion (2017)
- Net income: ▼US$ 88.6 million (2017)
- Total assets: ▲US$ 48.0 billion (2018)
- Number of employees: 9,574 (2023)
- Parent: Itaú Unibanco
- Subsidiaries: Itaú Colombia
- Website: www.itau.cl

Itaú Chile is a Chilean commercial bank that is the subsidiary of Brazilian Itaú Unibanco. As of 2023, the bank had 168 branches in Chile and 68 branches in Colombia. Itaú Corpbanca is headquartered in Santiago and has offices in Lima, Madrid, Miami and New York City.

== History ==
In 1871, a group of neighbors from Concepción led by Aníbal Pinto, who would later become President of Chile, drew up the by-laws of Banco de Concepción. The Bank began business on October 6, 1871 and has continued operating uninterrupted until today, which makes it the oldest bank in Chile. Following nationalization of private banking in 1971, the ownership of the Bank changed and came under the control of CORFO. That same year, Banco de Concepción acquired the local interests of Banco Francés and Italiano, which provided the institution presence in Santiago.

Later, in 1972, the bank purchased Banco de Chillán and, in 1975, Banco de Valdivia. In November 1975, CORFO sold shares to private businessmen who took control of the bank the following year. After a period of growth, in 1980 Banco de Concepción was redefined as a nationwide bank; it changed its name to Banco Concepción and moved its headquarters from Concepción to Santiago.

In 1986 the National Mining Society (SONAMI) acquired the Bank and took special interest in financing small and medium-scale mining projects, increased its capital and sold its riskier portfolio to the Central Bank. In late 1995, SONAMI sold the majority of its shareholding in the Bank to a group of investors led by Álvaro Saieh, through the holding company INFISA (now Corp Group). In 2014 the bank merged with Banco Itaú Chile, and was renamed to Itaú Corpbanca.

=== Following the Corp Group acquisition ===
Since the acquisition, the shareholders defined a new strategy; restructuring and repositioning its business in order to compete with Chile's leading institutions. To promote growth, the controlling group redefined the Bank's objectives making its target market personal financing and developing products for the middle-income population and small and medium-sized companies.

In the first quarter of 1997 the shareholders of Banco Concepción reached an agreement with the Chilean Central Bank over extinguishing the subordinated debt that had existed since the early 1980s. As part of the repositioning strategy the bank's name was changed to Corpbanca. In 1998, through the acquisition of Corfinsa (consumer loan division of Banco Sudamericano) and Financiera Condell, the bank formed Bancondell initiating its presence in the medium – lower income consumer business (massive banking). The defined strategy helped Corpbanca achieve the financial sector's second strongest loan growth over the following seven years and, in addition, reversing the 1999 losses and achieved an adequate Return on equity since 2001.

In November 2002, Itaú Corpbanca issued shares in the local market for a total of USD$250 million. The issuance was made in the Emerging Stock Market, being the first issuer to issue instruments in such market.

Subsequently, in November 2004, Corpbanca took a major step towards internationalization when it completed the process of listing its American Depositary Receipts (ADRs) on the New York Stock Exchange.

On April 1, 2016, Coprbanca was acquired Brazilian bank Itaú Unibanco, they held 66.7% with the rest owned by minority shareholders. The bank was renamed as Itaú Corpbanca.

== Operations ==
The Bank provides a wide range of both commercial and retail banking services to its customers. In addition, Corpbanca provides financial advisory services, mutual fund management, insurance brokerage and securities brokerage services through its subsidiaries.

The Bank was listed on the New York Stock Exchange for the first time on November 1, 2004. As of December 31, 2005, Corpbanca had a nationwide network of 68 branches in Chile, including 28 branches operating under the CorpBanca name, 20 branches operating under the Bancondell name and 20 integrated branches, which operate under both the Corpbanca and Bancondell names. As of December 31, 2005, the Bank owned and operated 108 automated teller machines (ATMs) in Chile. Itaú CorpBanca's customers have access to over 4,000 ATMs in Chile through its agreement with Redbanc S.A. (Redbanc).
