= Banco Itaú =

Former brazilian banking institution

Banco Itaú S.A.
- Type: Subsidiary
- Industry: Finance and insurance
- Founded: 1945
- Defunct: 2008
- Headquarters: São Paulo, São Paulo, Brazil
- Key people: Candido Botelho Bracher
- Products: Banking
- Revenue: ▲US$ 32.9 Billion (2007)
- Net income: ▲US$ 5.2 Billion (2007)
- Total assets: ▲US$ 208.5 Billion (2007)
- Number of employees: 94,779 (2016)
- Parent: Itaú Unibanco
- Website: www.itau.com.br

Banco Itaú S.A. was a Brazilian bank that merged with Unibanco on November 4, 2008, to form Banco Itaú Unibanco.

== History ==
Banco Itaú traces its origins to 1945, when it was established as Banco Central de Crédito. It later adopted the name Banco Federal de Crédito. In 1964, Banco Federal de Crédito merged with Banco Itaú, a rural bank linked to a business group from Itaú de Minas, in the state of Minas Gerais, creating Banco Federal Itaú S.A."A trajetória do Banco Itaú". Banco Itaú official site (in Portuguese). Archived from the original on 2011-07-06. During the remainder of the decade, the bank expanded through the acquisitions of Banco Sul Americano (1966) and Banco da América (1969).

Throughout the 1970s, Banco Itaú continued its domestic expansion by incorporating Banco Aliança in Rio de Janeiro (1973), Banco Português do Brasil (1974) and Banco União Comercial (1974). In 1979, it began its international operations by opening a representative office in New York City and a subsidiary in Buenos Aires.

Expansion continued during the 1980s with the acquisition of Banco Pinto de Magalhães in 1985. Although it was a relatively small institution, the acquisition strengthened Banco Itaú's position during a period of consolidation in Brazil's banking sector. In 1984, the bank also upgraded its New York representative office to a full branch.

During the 1990s, Banco Itaú combined acquisitions, technological modernization and international expansion. In 1994, it established Banco Itaú Europa, Banco Itaú Argentina and Itaú Bank in the Cayman Islands. The following year, it acquired BFB (Banco Francês e Brasileiro) from Credit Lyonnais. It also purchased several former state-owned banks following their privatization:

- 1997: Banerj (Rio de Janeiro)
- 1998: BEMGE (Minas Gerais)
- 2000: Banestado (Paraná)
- 2001: BEG (Goiás)

The bank also invested heavily in automation during the decade, expanding its network of ATMs and customer self-service technologies while reducing its workforce by more than half.

Banco Itaú further expanded its international presence by acquiring Bamerindus Luxembourg in 1997, subsequently renamed Banco Itaú Europa Luxembourg. In 1998, it acquired Banco del Buen Ayre in Argentina, which was later incorporated into Banco Itaú Argentina, subsequently renamed Banco Itaú Buen Ayre.

The bank also entered into strategic partnerships. In 1996, Banco Itaú and Bankers Trust formed Itaú Bankers Trust Banco de Investimento, later renamed Itauvest Banco de Investimento. Banco Itaú also became a significant shareholder in Banco BPI, one of Portugal's largest banking institutions. In 2002, it merged Banco BBA-Creditanstalt S.A. with its wholesale banking operations, leading to the creation of Banco Itaú-BBA in 2003.

Expansion through acquisitions continued in the 2000s. In 2002, Banco Itaú acquired Banco Fiat together with Fiat's vehicle financing operations in Brazil, and in 2004 it opened a branch in Tokyo.

In April 2006, Banco Itaú acquired the Brazilian operations of BankBoston, following Bank of America's acquisition of FleetBoston. The transaction added approximately 300,000 customers and R$22 billion in assets to Banco Itaú, while Bank of America acquired an approximately 6% ownership stake in the bank. As part of the agreement, Banco Itaú also obtained the exclusive option to acquire BankBoston's operations in Chile and Uruguay. Following regulatory approval in late 2006 and early 2007, these operations became Banco Itaú Chile and Banco Itaú Uruguay.

On 2 November 2008, Banco Itaú and Unibanco, then Brazil's third-largest private banking group, announced plans to merge."Shares soar as Brazilian banks merge". Financial Times. The merger received approval from the Central Bank of Brazil in February 2009.

In 2020, following an investigation into fees improperly charged between 2008 and 2018, Itaú signed an agreement with the Central Bank of Brazil committing to reimburse R$75.6 million to approximately 4.7 million customers.Garcia, Larissa (2020-06-04). "Itaú ressarcirá 4,7 milhões de clientes por tarifas cobradas de forma indevida". Folha de S.Paulo (in Portuguese). Archived from the original on 2020-06-05.

== Logo Evolution ==
1966-1973

1973-1980

1980-1992

1992-2003

2003-2008
