= Cabra Corral =

Coordinates: 25°16′S 65°29′W

- Municipality and village
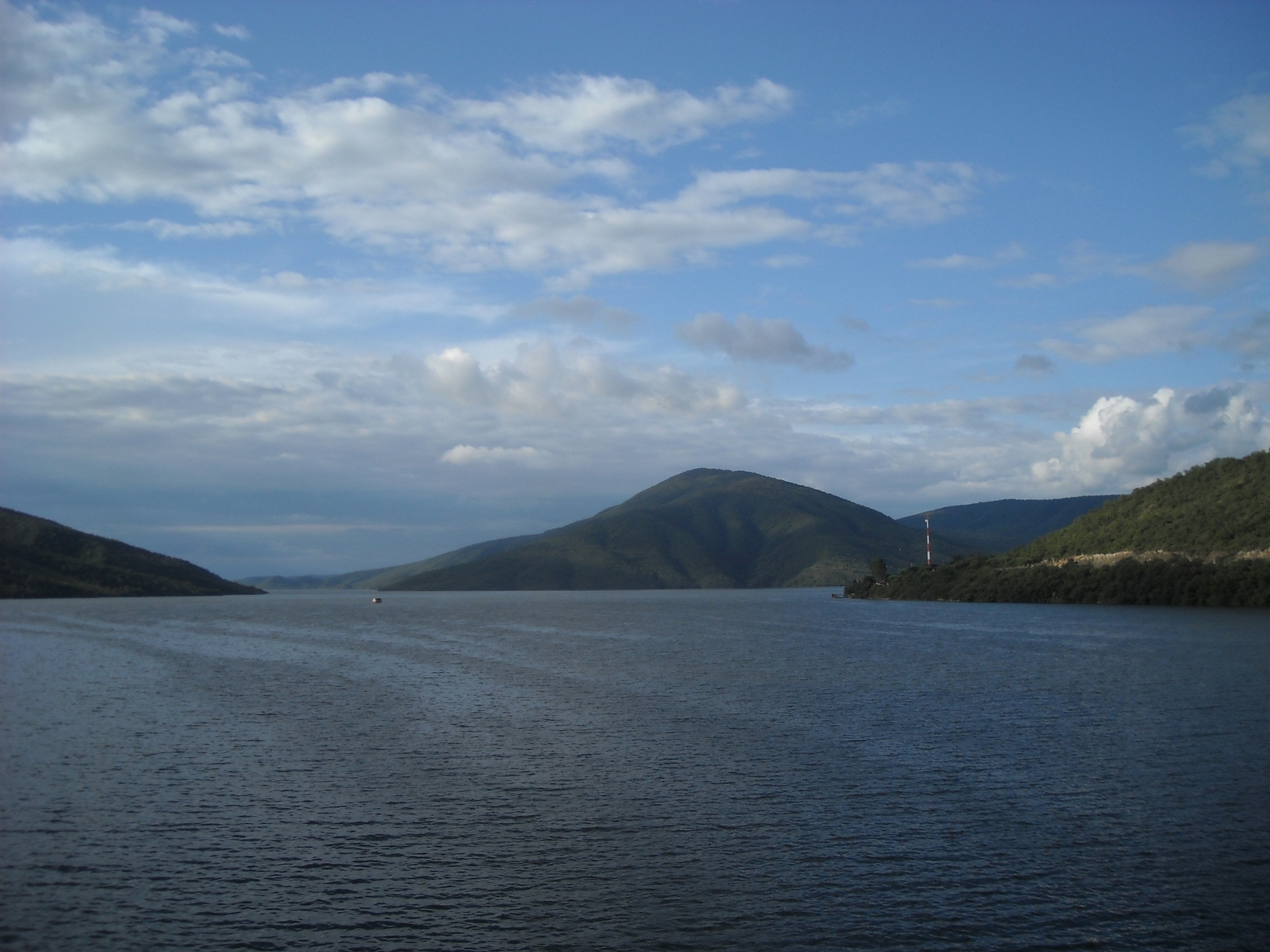
- Cabra Corral reservoir
- Interactive map of Cabra Corral
- Country: Argentina
- Province: Salta Province
- Time zone: UTC−3 (ART)

Cabra Corral is a small village and rural municipality in Salta Province in northwestern Argentina. It has only 25 inhabitants. Population numbers have decreased since the last census.
