= João Moreira Salles =

Brazilian documentary filmmaker and publisher

- Born: 1962 (age 63–64); Rio de Janeiro, Brazil
- Occupations: Documentary filmmaker, publisher
- Known for: Santiago, piauí
- Relatives: Walther Moreira Salles (father); Walter Salles (brother); Pedro Moreira Salles (brother); Fernando Roberto Moreira Salles (brother)

João Moreira Salles (born 1962) is a Brazilian documentary filmmaker and the president of the Moreira Salles Institute. In 2006 he founded the monthly magazine piauí. He has taught documentary filmmaking at the Pontifical Catholic University of Rio de Janeiro and at Princeton University.

According to Forbes, his net worth was estimated at US$5.1 billion as of July 2026.

== Early life and family ==
Moreira Salles was born in Rio de Janeiro, the son of diplomat and banker Walther Moreira Salles. His brothers are Fernando Roberto Moreira Salles, Pedro Moreira Salles and filmmaker Walter Salles.

== Filmography ==
- 1989: América (TV series)
- 1990: Blues (TV series)
- 1998: Futebol (TV series, co-directed with Arthur Fontes)
- 1999: News from a Personal War (Notícias de uma Guerra Particular; co-directed and co-written with Kátia Lund)
- 2003: Nelson Freire
- 2004: Intermissions (Entreatos)
- 2006: Santiago
- 2017: In the Intense Now (No Intenso Agora)

== Awards ==
- 2000: Silver Daisy Award, Brazil, for Notícias de uma Guerra Particular
- 2001: Special Mention, Málaga Spanish Film Festival (shared with Kátia Lund)
- 2003: Silver Daisy Award, Brazil, for Nelson Freire
- 2004: São Paulo Association of Art Critics Award for Best Documentary, for Nelson Freire
- 2004: Cinema Brazil Grand Prize for Best Documentary, for Nelson Freire
- 2005: São Paulo Association of Art Critics Award for Best Film, for Entreatos
- 2005: Havana Film Festival Grand Coral, Second Prize, for Entreatos
- 2007: Best Documentary, Lima Latin American Film Festival, for Santiago
- 2007: Grand Prize, Cinéma du Réel, for Santiago
- 2007: Audience Award, Alba International Film Festival, for Santiago
- 2008: Knight Grand Jury Prize, Miami International Film Festival, for Santiago
- 2010: Prêmio Esso de Informação Científica, Tecnológica e Ecológica, for Artur tem um problema

== Personal life ==
He is the son of Brazilian diplomat and banker Walter Moreira Salles, making him the brother of businessman Fernando Roberto Moreira Salles, banker Pedro Moreira Salles and film director Walter Salles, of Oscar-winner I'm Still Here and Oscar-nominated Central Station.

== Filmography ==
- 1989 - América (TV series)
- 1990 - Blues (TV series)
- 1998 - Futebol (TV series directed with Arthur Fontes)
- 1999 - News From a Personal War (directed and written with Kátia Lund)
- 2003 - Nelson Freire
- 2004 - Intermissions
- 2006 - Santiago
- 2017 - No Intenso Agora

== Awards and nominations ==
- 2000 - Silver Daisy Awards, Brazil (Silver Daisy for Notícias de uma Guerra Particular)
- 2001 - Málaga Spanish Film Festival (Special Mention for Notícias de uma Guerra Particular, shared with Kátia Lund)
- 2003 - Silver Daisy Awards, Brazil (Silver Daisy for Nelson Freire)
- 2004 - São Paulo Association of Art Critics Awards (Best Documentary for Nelson Freire)
- 2004 - Cinema Brazil Grand Prize (Best Documentary for Nelson Freire)
- 2005 - São Paulo Association of Art Critics Awards (Best Film for Entreatos)
- 2005 - Havana Film Festival (Grand Coral - Second Prize for Entreatos)
- 2007 - Lima Latin American Film Festival (Best Documentary for Santiago)
- 2007 - Cinéma du réel (Grand Prize for "Santiago")
- 2007 - Alba International Film Festival (Audience Award for "Santiago")
- 2008 - Miami International Film Festival (Knight Grand Jury Prize for "Santiago")

== Contributions to cinema ==
- 2001 - A Beautiful Mind (Location Scout)
- 2003 - Dorm Daze (Script Doctor (uncredited))
- 2006 - Dorm Daze 2 (Substance Consultant)

== Journalism ==
- 2010 - Prêmio Esso de Informação Científica, Tecnológica e Ecológica for Artur tem um problema
- 2011 - Frist Golden Campus Casserole Award – Best Gastronomy Critic, category university cafeterias
