= Adão Dãxalebaradã =

Brazilian singer and actor

Adão Dãxalebaradã (1955–2004) was a Brazilian singer and actor. His work revolves around Afro-Brazilian religions, and he composed about 500 songs on the subject. His stage name, "Xalebaradã" means "beginning, middle and end" in Yoruba.

== Compositions ==
- Africa
- Weapons & Peace
- Weapons & Peace (remix)
- Woa Lobi Bibi
- Computer
- Deus é um Negrão
- Diamond
- Scholasticism
- Ilalaa
- Luanda
- Life curta
- Curta Life (remix)
- Life curta
- Xirê
