= Itaú Unibanco =

Brazilian banking company

Itaú Unibanco S.A.

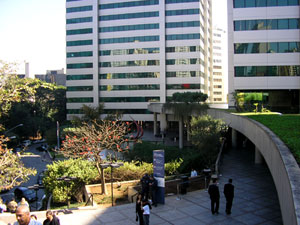
- Headquarters in São Paulo
- Type: Sociedade Anônima
- Traded as: B3: ITUB3, ITUB4; NYSE: ITUB
- Industry: Financial services
- Predecessor: Banco Itaú; Unibanco
- Founded: 4 November 2008; 17 years ago
- Headquarters: São Paulo, São Paulo, Brazil
- Area served: Worldwide
- Key people: Milton Maluhy Filho (CEO); Pedro Moreira Salles (Chairman); Giancarlo Moreira (CFO)
- Products: Retail banking; corporate banking; investment banking; insurance; private banking; private equity; mortgage loans; credit cards; investment management; wealth management; asset management; mutual funds; exchange-traded funds; index funds
- Revenue: ▲US$ 33.2 billion (2025)
- Net income: ▲US$ 8.8 billion (2025)
- Total assets: ▲US$ 559.3 billion (2025)
- Number of employees: 92,470: Brazil: 82,693; World: 9,777
- Parent: Itaúsa
- Subsidiaries: Itaú Chile; Itaú Paraguay; Itaú Uruguay; Rede; Hiper; Credicard
- Website: www.itau.com.br

Banco Itaú Unibanco S.A. is a Brazilian financial services company headquartered in São Paulo, Brazil. Itaú Unibanco was formed through the merger of Banco Itaú and Unibanco in 2008. It is the largest banking institution in Brazil, as well as the largest in Latin America, and the seventy-third largest bank in the world. The bank is listed on the B3 in São Paulo and in NYSE in New York.

Itaú Unibanco has operations in Brazil, Chile, Colombia, Panama, Paraguay, United States and Uruguay in the Americas, as well as in Luxembourg, Portugal, Switzerland and the United Kingdom in Europe; China, Hong Kong, Japan and United Arab Emirates in Asia. It has over 33,000 service points globally, including 4,336 branches in Brazil and 679 million customers globally.

Itaúsa, a large Brazilian conglomerate ranking among Fortune magazine's top 200 corporations in the world, serves as the parent company. Outside Brazil, Itaú Unibanco has offices in Asunción, Buenos Aires, Cayman Islands, Dubai, Hong Kong, Lisbon, London, Luxembourg, Montevideo, Nassau, New York, Miami, Santiago, Shanghai, Tokyo, and Zürich.

In 2022, Itaú was considered the most valuable brand in Brazil.

== History ==
In November 2006, Banco Itaú bought BankBoston's assets in Brazil, Chile, and Uruguay.

On November 16 2008, Banco Itaú and Unibanco announced the merger that resulted in Banco Itaú Unibanco. The institution was born with R$575 billion in assets, a net equity of around R$51.7 billion and a portfolio of combined credit of R$225.3 billion. The new bank had 4,800 branches and service branches, representing 18% of Brazil's banking network, and 14.5 million account holders (18% of the market). In terms of credit volume, it represented 19% of the Brazilian system and in total deposits, funds and managed portfolios, 21% by 2008. In the insurance and pension plan market, the new group had a 17% and 24% share, respectively. The wholesale operations (corporate) totaled more than R$65 billion, serving more than 2,000 economic groups in Brazil. The private banking (wealth management) business had become the largest in Latin America, with approximately R$90 billion in assets under management.

On August 22, 2009, Banco Itaú Unibanco and insurance company Porto Seguro announced their alliance.

In June 2013, the bank agreed to buy Citibank Uruguay's retail banking operations.

In 2014, Banco Itaú announced that it was merging with Chilean bank Corpbanca. As a result, Itaú bought Helm Bank, Corpbanca's operation in Colombia and Panama, and rebranded it under the Itaú name.

== Logo Evolution ==
1966-1973

1973-1980

1980-1992

1992-2003

2003-2023

2023-present
