= It's All True – International Documentary Film Festival =

Brazilian annual international film festival

- Location: São Paulo and Rio de Janeiro, Brazil
- Founded: 12 April 1996; 30 years ago
- Language: International
- Website: etudoverdade.com.br/en/home/

The It's All True – International Documentary Film Festival (Portuguese: É Tudo Verdade - Festival Internacional de Documentários), also known as É Tudo Verdade, is an international film festival held annually in São Paulo and Rio de Janeiro, Brazil.

Launched in 1996 by film critic Amir Labaki, is one of the main events in Latin America dedicated exclusively to nonfiction productions. Held annually in São Paulo and Rio de Janeiro, some of its editions was subsequently taken to other Brazilians cities, as Brasília and Campinas.

The festival presents several titles in competitive programs for Brazilian and international short, medium or feature-length documentaries, the Latin American Focus, the informative section State of Things, Retrospectives, and Special Screenings.

In 2015, it became the first Latin American festival to automatically qualify the winners of the Short Film Competitions (both Brazilian and International) to compete for the Oscars for Best Documentary (Short Subject).

== History and background ==
In 1995, the Brazilian film critic Amir Labaki had the idea of creating a film festival in Brazil dedicated exclusively to nonfiction narratives, until then a type of event that did not exist in the country.

To immediately establish itself as part of the Brazilian cultural scene, the event organization decided to hold the festival simultaneously in São Paulo and Rio de Janeiro, the most important cities in the country. The festival name was inspired in the unfinished Orson Welles feature film "It's All True".

In the following year, in April 1996, the first edition was organized with 29 short and feature length documentaries screened over 10 days. In Rio, it started on April 12 and in São Paulo began at April 16.

This first edition was non-competitive, including 12 Brazilian and 10 international productions launched between 1994 and 1996, as well as a retrospective with 7 films directed by the cuban filmmaker Santiago Álvarez. Some of the international entries for the festival were "Jaime de Nevares, último viaje", by Marcelo Céspedes and Carmen Guarini, and opening screening in Rio; "Carl Th. Dreyer: My Metier", by Torben Skjødt Jensen, and opening screening in São Paulo; "The Typewriter, the Rifle & the Movie Camera", by Adam Simon; "The House on Arbat Street", by Marina Goldovskaya; "Lumière et compagnie", by Sarah Moon; "Po zwycięstwie ", by Marcel Łoziński; and "The Murmuring", by Byun Young-joo. Among the Brazilian documentary films shown during the festival were "Carmen Miranda: Bananas is My Business", by Helena Solberg; "Two Billion Hearts", by Murillo Salles; and "Yndio do Brasil", by Sylvio Back.

From the second edition in April 1997, It's All True became a competitive film festival. In the early years several well-known international guests such as Marcel Ophuls, Kevin Macdonald, Johan van der Keuken, and Trinh T. Minh-ha attended the event.

Since 2015, the winners of both Brazilian and International Short Film Competitions are automatically qualified to be considered by the Academy of Motion Pictures Arts and Sciences in Hollywood to compete for the Oscar for Best Documentary (Short Subject), the first and sole Latin American festival to be granted this status.

In the 25th edition in 2020, it was presented for the first time an online festival of non-fictional productions, with about 50 hours of Brazilian and International programming, in 30 different titles of feature films, shorts and series, streaming in partnership with the Itaú Cultural website, Spcine Play and Canal Brasil Play.

== Awards ==
The festival became competitive from the 2nd edition in 1997, with the International Competition and the Brazilian Competition for medium/feature-length documentaries.

Currently, the awards given by the jury at the International Competition are: Best Feature or Medium-Length Documentary, Special Jury Award for a Feature or Medium-Length Film, Honorable Mention for a Feature or Medium-Length Documentary, Best Documentary Short-Film, and Honorable Mention for a Short-Film.

There are also a Latin-American Competition (Best Documentary Feature Film and Honorable Mention), and plus exclusive awards for Brazilian films (Best Feature or Medium-Length Documentary, Honorable Mention for a Feature or Medium-Length Documentary and Best Documentary Short-Film).

=== International Competition Best Feature Documentary ===
Year	Film	Original title	Director	Country
1996	No awards given			
1997	Noel Field—The Fictitious Spy	Noel Field – Der erfundene Spion	Werner Schweizer	Switzerland*
1998	The Unseen	Nespatřené	Miroslav Janek	Czech Republic*
1999	Here We Are Waiting for You See	Nós que Aqui Estamos por Vós Esperamos	Marcelo Masagão	Brazil*
2000	The Long Holiday	De Grote Vakantie	Johan van der Keuken	Netherlands*
2001	Sacrificio – Who betrayed Che Guevara?	Sacrificio - Who betrayed Che Guevara?	Erik Gandini and Tarik Saleh	Sweden*
2002	August – A Moment Before The Eruption	August - A Moment Before The Eruption	Avi Mograbi	Israel*
2003	The Prisoner of the Iron Bars (self -portraits)	O Prisioneiro da Grade de Ferro - Auto-Retratos	Paulo Sacramento	Brazil
2004	The Soul of the Bone	A Alma do Osso	Cao Guimarães	Brazil
2005	Reportitoner	Reportitoner	Michal Leszczylowski	Sweden*
2006	Into Great Silence	Die Große Stille	Philip Gröning	Germany*
2007	Tomorrow to the Sea	Mañana al Mar	Ines Thomsen	Germany
2008	Cosmonaut Polyakov	Cosmonaut Polyakov	Dana Ranga	Romania*
2009	Burma VJ	Burma VJ: Reporter i et Lukket Land	Anders Høgsbro Østergaard	Denmark*
2010**	La Danse	La Danse – Le Ballet de l'Opéra de Paris	Frederick Wiseman	France*
2010**	The Most Dangerous Man in America	The Most Dangerous Man in America	Rick Goldsmith and Judith Ehrlich	United States*
2011	You Don't Like the Truth	You Don't Like the Truth	Luc Côté and Patricio Henríquez	Denmark
2012	Planet of Snall	Dalpaengee eui byeol	Seung-Jun Yi	Japan*
2013	The Machine Which Makes Everything Disappear	Manqana, romelic kvelafers gaaqrobs	Tinatin Gurchiani	Georgia*
2014	Jasmine	Jasmine	Alain Ughetto	France
2015	France Is Our Mother Country	La France est Notre Patrie	Rithy Panh	Cambodia*
2016	A Family Affair	A Family Affair	Tom Fassaert	Netherlands
2017	Communion	Komunia	Anna Zamecka	Poland*
2018	The Distant Barking of Dogs	Olegs krig	Simon Lereng Wilmont	Sweden
2019	Cold Case Hammarskjöld	Cold Case Hammarskjöld	Mads Brügger	Denmark

- * Denotes first win
- ** Two winners at the same festival
