= Walter Carvalho =

Brazilian cinematographer

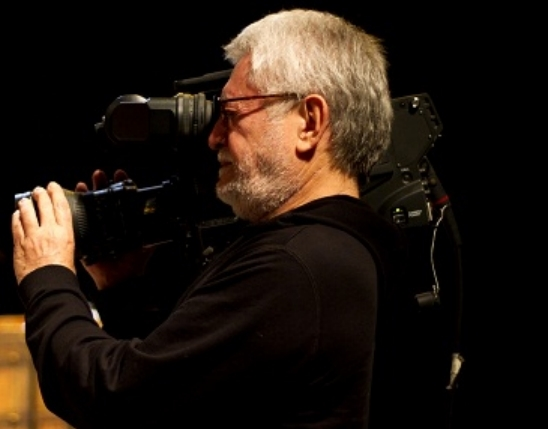
Walter Carvalho

Walter Carvalho (born 1947 in João Pessoa, Paraíba, Brazil) is a critically and internationally acclaimed Brazilian cinematographer.

Carvalho has worked on over 60 films in his career since entering the Cinema of Brazil in 1973.

He has won some 30 different professional film awards to date and has worked on acclaimed Brazilian films such as Carandiru in 2003.

He is the father of also cinematographer Lula Carvalho.

== Selected filmography ==
- Sergeant Getulio (1983)
- Central Station (1998)
- Midnight (1998)
- To the Left of the Father (2001)
- Madame Satã (2002)
- Mango Yellow (2002)
- Carandiru (2003)
- Cazuza – O Tempo Não Pára (2004)
- Intermissions (2004)
- Heleno (2011)
