= List of Playboy (Brazil) covers =

This is a list of issue covers of the Brazilian edition of Playboy magazine. The entries on this table include each cover's subjects. This list is for the regular monthly issues of the Brazilian Playboy, as well as its 1975–1980 predecessor, A Revista do Homem; any one-time-only special issues are not included.

While a monthly magazine under Editora Abril, the magazine has had uneven periodicity since its change to dedicated publisher PBB Entertainment in 2016.

== 1970s ==
Issue	Cover	Date
001	Livia Mund	August 1975
002	Fernanda Bruni	September 1975
003	Bibi Voguel	October 1975
004	Charlotte Rampling	November 1975
005	Susana Gonçalves	December 1975
006	Regina Duarte	January 1976
007	Marina Montini	February 1976
008	Ítala Nandi	March 1976
009	Pia Nascimento	April 1976
010	Djenane Machado	May 1976
011	Cynira Arruda	June 1976
012	Esmeralda de Barros	July 1976
013	Tamara Taxman (1/2)	August 1976
014	Vera Manhães	September 1976
015	Neila Tavares	October 1976
016	Marta Moyano	November 1976
017	Elke Sommer	December 1976
018	Erica Blanc	January 1977
019	Esmeralda de Barros	February 1977
020	Gatas do Planeta dos Homens ("Babes from 'Men's Planet'")	March 1977
021	Jill De Vries	April 1977
022	Leila Cravo	May 1977
023	Patti McGuire	June 1977
024	Jussara	July 1977
025	Ann and Deborah	August 1977
026	Lenna Sjooblom	September 1977
027	Susan Kiger	October 1977
028	Branca	November 1977
029	Sondra Theodore	December 1977
030	Malu	January 1978
031	Eva	February 1978
032	Debra	March 1978
033	Lynn Schiller	April 1978
034	Garotas da Argentina (Girls from Argentina)	May 1978
035	Susan & Patty Kiger	June 1978
036	Debra Jo Fondren	July 1978
037	Betty Faria (1/2)	August 1978
038	Debra Peterson	September 1978
039	As Secretárias ("The Secretaries")	October 1978
040	Cida Ventura	November 1978
041	Farrah Fawcett	December 1978
042	Darine Stern	January 1979
043	Marisa (1/2)	February 1979
044	As Estudantes ("The Students")	March 1979
045	Ruthy Ross	April 1979
046	Marilyn Lange	May 1979
047	Laura Lyons	June 1979
048	Monique	July 1979
049	Kathleen	August 1979
050	Cida Ventura	September 1979
051	Anita	October 1979
052	As Garotas dos Cursinhos ("Girls from Prep Schools")	November 1979
053	Raquel Welch	December 1979

== 1980s ==
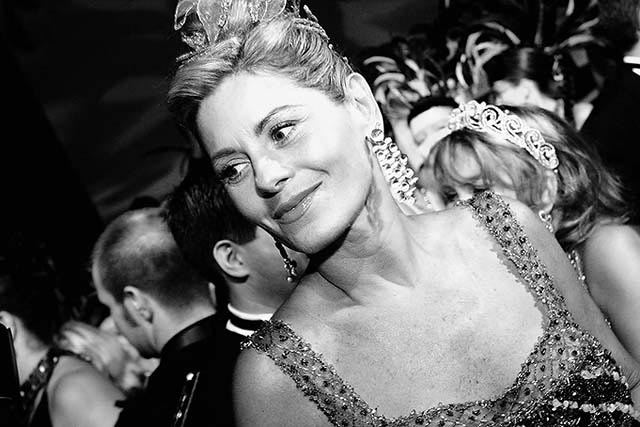
Brazilian actress Vera Fischer modelled for Playboy first in the August 1982 issue, then again 18 years later, in January 2000.

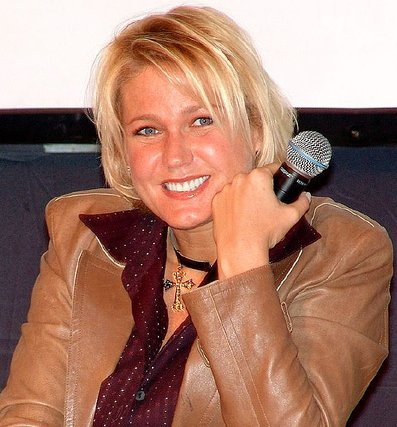
Before being a children's television show host, Xuxa modelled for various adult magazines. She was in the December 1982 edition of Brazilian Playboy.

Issue	Cover	Date
054	Alcione Mazzeo	January 1980
055	Sônia e As Mulatas (Sônia and the Mulato Girls)	February 1980
056	Kathleen	March 1980
057	Lucélia Santos (1/2)	April 1980
058	As Aeromoças ("The Flight Attendants")	May 1980
059	Oneida (1/2)	June 1980
060	Lídia Brondi (1/2)	July 1980
061	Denise Dumont (1/2)	August 1980
062	Bo Derek	September 1980
063	Laura de Nigris	October 1980
064	Simone Carvalho	November 1980
065	Oneida (2/2)	December 1980
066	Denise Dumont (2/2)	January 1981
067	Garotas do Rio ("Girls from Rio")	February 1981
068	As Estudantes ("The Students")	March 1981
069	Monique Lafond	April 1981
070	Aline	May 1981
071	Sandra Bréa	June 1981
072	Zaira Zambelli	July 1981
073	Nádia Lippi	August 1981
074	Vera Morgari	September 1981
075	Marneida Vidal	October 1981
076	Lucélia Santos (2/2)	November 1981
077	Maria Cláudia (1/2)	December 1981
078	Dina Sfat	January 1982
079	Sydne Rome	February 1982
080	Angelina Muniz (1/2)	March 1982
081	Marisa (2/2)	April 1982
082	A Garota Do Fantástico (The Fantástico Girl)	May 1982
083	Tássia Camargo (1/3)	June 1982
084	Fabiana	July 1982
085	Vera Fischer (1/2)	August 1982
086	Tamara Taxman (2/2)	September 1982
087	Suzane Carvalho	October 1982
088	Claudia Rey	November 1982
089	Xuxa Meneghel	December 1982
090	Lúcia Veríssimo	January 1983
091	Nice Meirelles	February 1983
092	Christiane Torloni (1/2)	March 1983
093	Sílvia Bandeira	April 1983
094	Luíza Brunet (1/3)	May 1983
095	Aldine Müller and Zaíra Bueno	June 1983
096	Carla Camurati	July 1983
097	Ísis de Oliveira (1/2)	August 1983
098	Superheroes Superman, The Phantom and Mandrake in bed with their girlfriends (humorous pictorial)	September 1983
099	Bia Andreazzi	October 1983
100	Divie	November 1983
101	Tânia Alves	December 1983
102	Maria Cláudia (2/2)	January 1984
103	Matilde Mastrangi	February 1984
104	Reny de Oliveira	March 1984
105	Simone Carvalho	April 1984
106	Lídia	May 1984
107	Sônia	June 1984
108	Cláudia Lúcia	July 1984
109	Lucinha Lins	August 1984
110	Sônia Braga (1/2)	September 1984
111	Betty Faria (2/2)	October 1984
112	Christiane Torloni (2/2)	November 1984
113	Luíza Brunet (2/3)	December 1984
114	Angelina Muniz (2/2)	January 1985
115	Cláudia Ohana (1/2)	February 1985
116	Rosemary	March 1985
117	Vera Lúcia	April 1985
118	Magda Cotrofe (1/3)	May 1985
119	Tássia Camargo (2/3)	June 1985
120	Monique Evans (1/3)	July 1985
121	Maria Zilda	August 1985
122	Cláudia Raia (1/2)	September 1985
123	Luciane Quadros	October 1985
124	Márcia Dornelles	November 1985
125	Cláudia Egito	December 1985
126	Cláudia Raia (2/2)	January 1986
127	Yoná Magalhães	February 1986
128	Rosane	March 1986
129	Débora Soares	April 1986
130	Luíza Brunet (3/3)	May 1986
131	Monique Evans (2/3)	June 1986
132	Sônia Braga (2/2)	July 1986
133	Renée de Vielmond	August 1986
134	Suzanna Mattos	September 1986
135	Lílian	October 1986
136	Mayara Magri	November 1986
137	Magda Cotrofe (2/3)	December 1986
138	Andrea	January 1987
139	Maitê Proença (1/2)	February 1987
140	Cláudia Alencar	March 1987
141	Sônia Lima	April 1987
142	Helô Pinheiro (1/2)	May 1987
143	Tânia Corrêa (1/2)	June 1987
144	Marcella Prado	July 1987
145	Lídia Brondi (2/2)	August 1987
146	Luma de Oliveira (1/5)	September 1987
147	Magda Cotrofe (3/3)	October 1987
148	Josi Campos	November 1987
149	Luciana Vendramini (1/2)	December 1987
150	Hortência	January 1988
151	Isadora Ribeiro (1/2)	February 1988
152	Luma de Oliveira (2/5)	March 1988
153	Lúcia Veríssimo	April 1988
154	Sueli Ribeiro	May 1988
155	Cátia Pedrosa	June 1988
156	Sueli dos Santos	July 1988
157	Isabela Garcia	August 1988
158	Andréa Veiga	September 1988
159	Jaqueline Meireles	October 1988
160	Mariette	November 1988
161	Cida Costa	December 1988
162	Elba Ramalho	January 1989
163	Nani Venâncio	February 1989
164	Sílvia Rossi	March 1989
165	Ana Lima	April 1989
166	Regina Meneghel	May 1989
167	Vanusa Spindler	June 1989
168	Verônica Rodrigues	July 1989
170	Françoise Forton	August 1989
171	Gisele Fraga	September 1989
172	Márcia Rodrigues	October 1989
173	Rosenery Mello	November 1989
174	Tássia Camargo (3/3)	December 1989

== 1990s ==
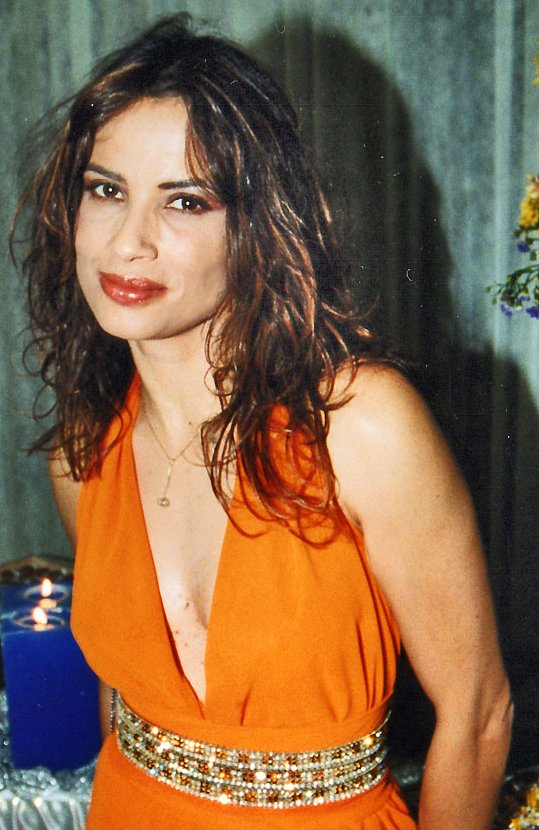
Actress Isadora Ribeiro posed once in February 1988, and again in June 1991.

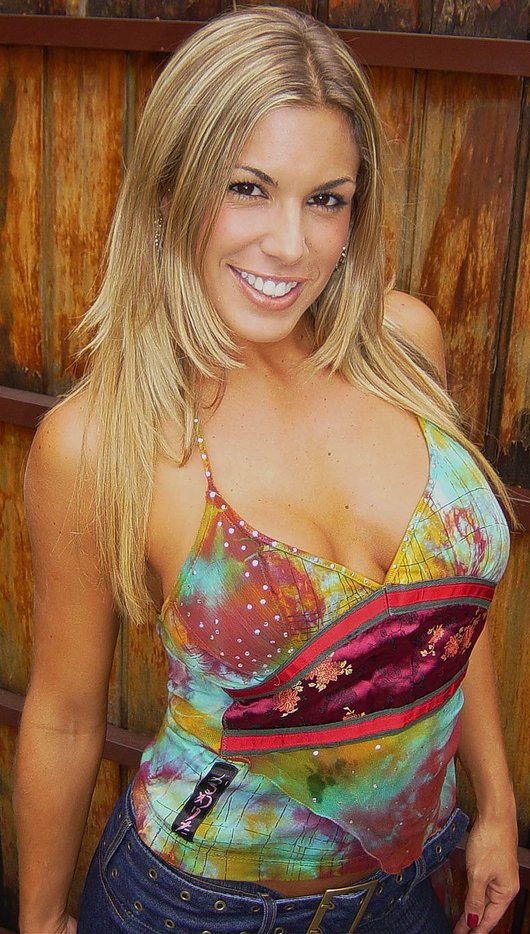
Model Joana Prado posed three times, with the December 1999 issue being the best-selling in the magazine's history.

Issue	Cover	Date
175	Erica Moro	January 1990
176	Mara Maravilha	February 1990
177	Luma de Oliveira (3/5)	March 1990
178	Cristiane Bifurco	April 1990
179	Lucimar Viana	May 1990
180	Sônia Campos	June 1990
181	Sarajane de Mendonça Stride	July 1990
182	Patrícia Meso	August 1990
183	Mônica Fraga	September 1990
184	Andréia Fetter	October 1990
185	Dóris Giesse	November 1990
186	Tânia Corrêa (2/2)	December 1990
187	Luciene Adami	January 1991
188	Karmita Medeiros	February 1991
189	Bruna Lombardi	March 1991
190	Kátia Maranhão	April 1991
191	Vera Zimmermann	May 1991
192	Isadora Ribeiro (2/2)	June 1991
193	Fátima Muniz Freire	July 1991
194	Cláudia Liz	August 1991
195	Andrea Guerra (1/2)	September 1991
196	Patrícia Torres	October 1991
197	Ísis de Oliveira (2/2)	November 1991
198	Sônia Lima (yes, She is the same Sônia Lima as the April 1987 cover ... search)	December 1991
199	Rosana Muniz	January 1992
200	Cristiana Oliveira	February 1992
201	Dulce Neves	March 1992
202	Mari Alexandre	April 1992
202	Cristina Mortágua	May 1992
203	Wanya Guerreiro	June 1992
204	Shirley Miranda	July 1992
205	Carla Marins	August 1992
206	Andrea Lista	September 1992
207	Porto triplets (Marilise, Lílian and Renata Porto)	October 1992
208	Vanessa Campos	November 1992
209	Marinara Costa	December 1992
210	Piera Pludwinski	January 1993
211	Dora Bria	February 1993
212	Veronica Castañera	March 1993
213	Kelly Cristina	April 1993
214	Mônica Carvalho (1/3)	May 1993
215	Núbia Oliveira	June 1993
216	Márcia Romão	July 1993
217	Andréa Rammé	August 1993
218	Rosimari and Rosângela Bosenbecker (twins)	September 1993
219	Fábia Taffarel	October 1993
220	Monique Evans (3/3)	November 1993
221	Luíza Tomé (1/2)	December 1993
222	Denise Ramos	January 1994
223	Regininha Poltergeist	February 1994
224	Maria Padilha	March 1994
225	Fabiana Oliveira	April 1994
226	Ana Lara Resende	May 1994
227	Liz Vargas	June 1994
228	Erika Albiero	July 1994
229	Cissa Guimarães	August 1994
230	Leila Gesing	September 1994
231	Tatiana Rammé	October 1994
232	Patrícia Lucchesi	November 1994
233	Simony	December 1994
234	Ana Alice	January 1995
235	Andrea de Oliveira	February 1995
236	Alexia Deschamps	March 1995
237	Karen Matzenbacher	April 1995
238	Luciana Pereira	May 1995
239	Dominiquea Scudera	June 1995
240	Bel, Robin Givens	July 1995
241	Adriane Galisteu (1/2)	August 1995
242	Nilza Monteiro	September 1995
243	Kátia Reis	October 1995
244	Maira Rocha	November 1995
245	Andréa Sorvetão	December 1995
246	Ana Elize	January 1996
247	Luiza Ambiel	February 1996
248	Andréa Greco	March 1996
249	Paloma Duarte	April 1996
250	Paula Burlamaqui	May 1996
251	Solange Gomes	June 1996
252	Kelly Christie	July 1996
253	Maitê Proença (2/2)	August 1996
254	Ana Ida Alvares	September 1996
255	Carla Perez (1/3)	October 1996
256	Isabel Fillardis	November 1996
257	Mônia Vogel	December 1996
258	Paula Melissa	January 1997
259	Luciana Botelho	February 1997
260	Leila Lopes	March 1997
261	Cida Marques	April 1997
262	Gabriela Alves	May 1997
263	Ely Ortega	June 1997
264	Malu Bailo	July 1997
265	Marisa Orth	August 1997
266	Alessandra Scatena	September 1997
267	Débora Rodrigues	October 1997
268	Mylla Christie	November 1997
269	Rose Anne	December 1997
270	As Ronaldinhas (Ronaldo's ex-girlfriends) (Nádia França and Viviane Brunieri)	January 1998
271	Scheila Carvalho (1/5)	February 1998
272	Tatiana Issa	March 1998
273	Carla Perez (2/3)	April 1998
274	Andrea Guerra (2/2)	May 1998
275	Rosiane Pinheiro	June 1998
276	Alessandra Matos	July 1998
277	Danielle Winits (1/2)	August 1998
278	Cindy Crawford	September 1998
279	Banana Split (The Girls from 'Banana Split') (Mariana Peres, Sandra Pascutti, Mônica Nocete, Adriana Rovere and Márcia Alves)	October 1998
280	Sheila Mello (1/3)	November 1998
281	Carina Girardi	December 1998
282	Solange Frazão	January 1999
283	Loiras da Cia do Pagode (The blondes from 'Cia do Pagode') (Daniela Freitas and Leila Farias)	February 1999
284	Tiazinha (Suzana Alves) (1/2)	March 1999
285	Débora Stróglio	April 1999
286	Cléo Brandão	May 1999
287	Vanessa Lombardi	June 1999
288	The Hzetes (Taís Valieri and Fabiana Garcia)	July 1999
289	Deborah Secco (1/2)	August 1999
290	Sheila (2/3) and Scheila (2/5) (Sheila Mello and Scheila Carvalho)	September 1999
291	Ângela Vieira	October 1999
292	Marina Lima	November 1999
293	Feiticeira (Joana Prado) (1/3)	December 1999

== 2000s ==
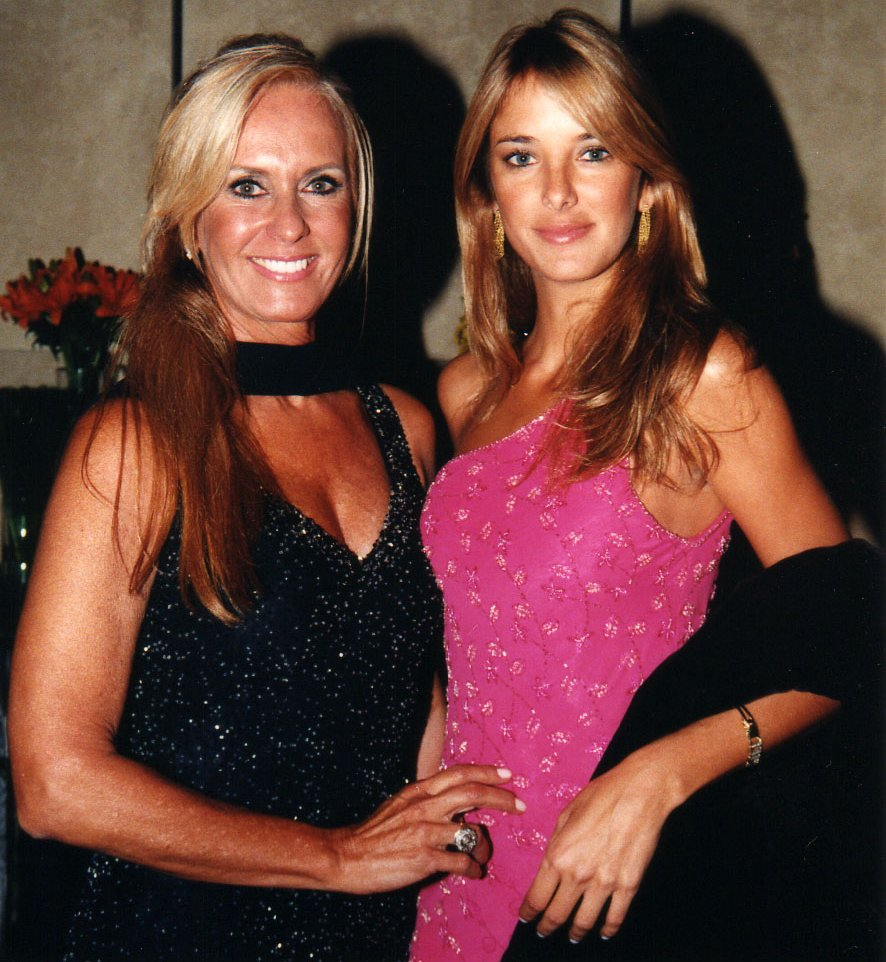
The real life Girl from Ipanema Heloísa Pinheiro and her daughter Ticiane Pinheiro were together on the April 2003 cover.

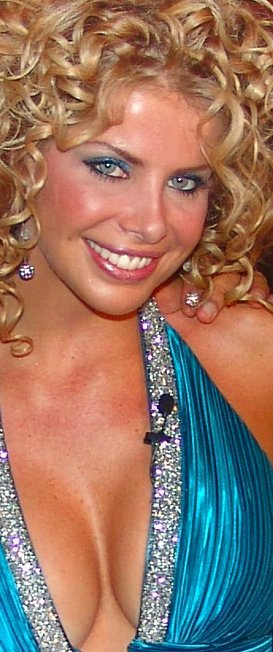
Actress Karina Bacchi, cover for December 2006.

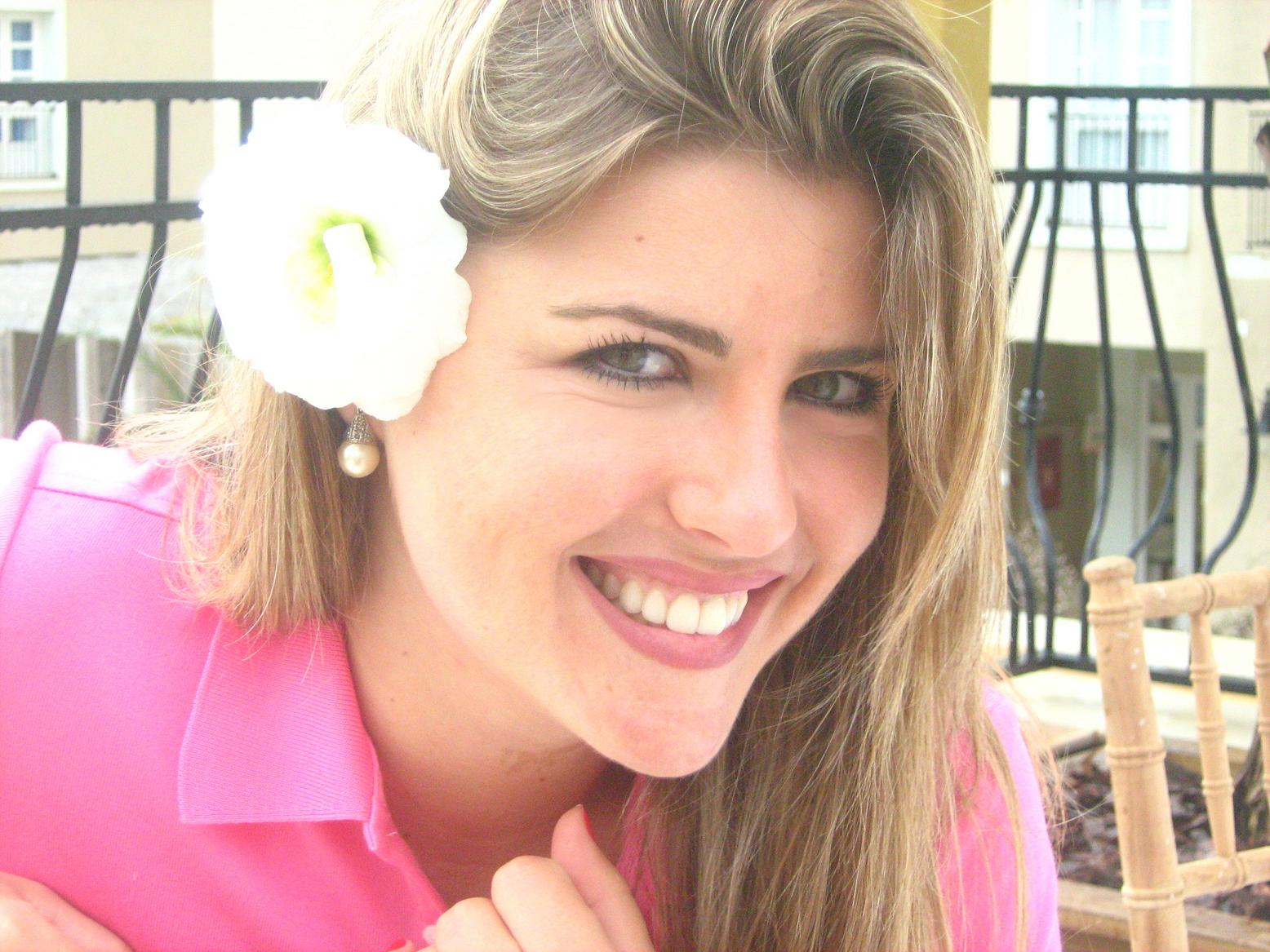
TV hostess Íris Stefanelli, cover for August 2007.

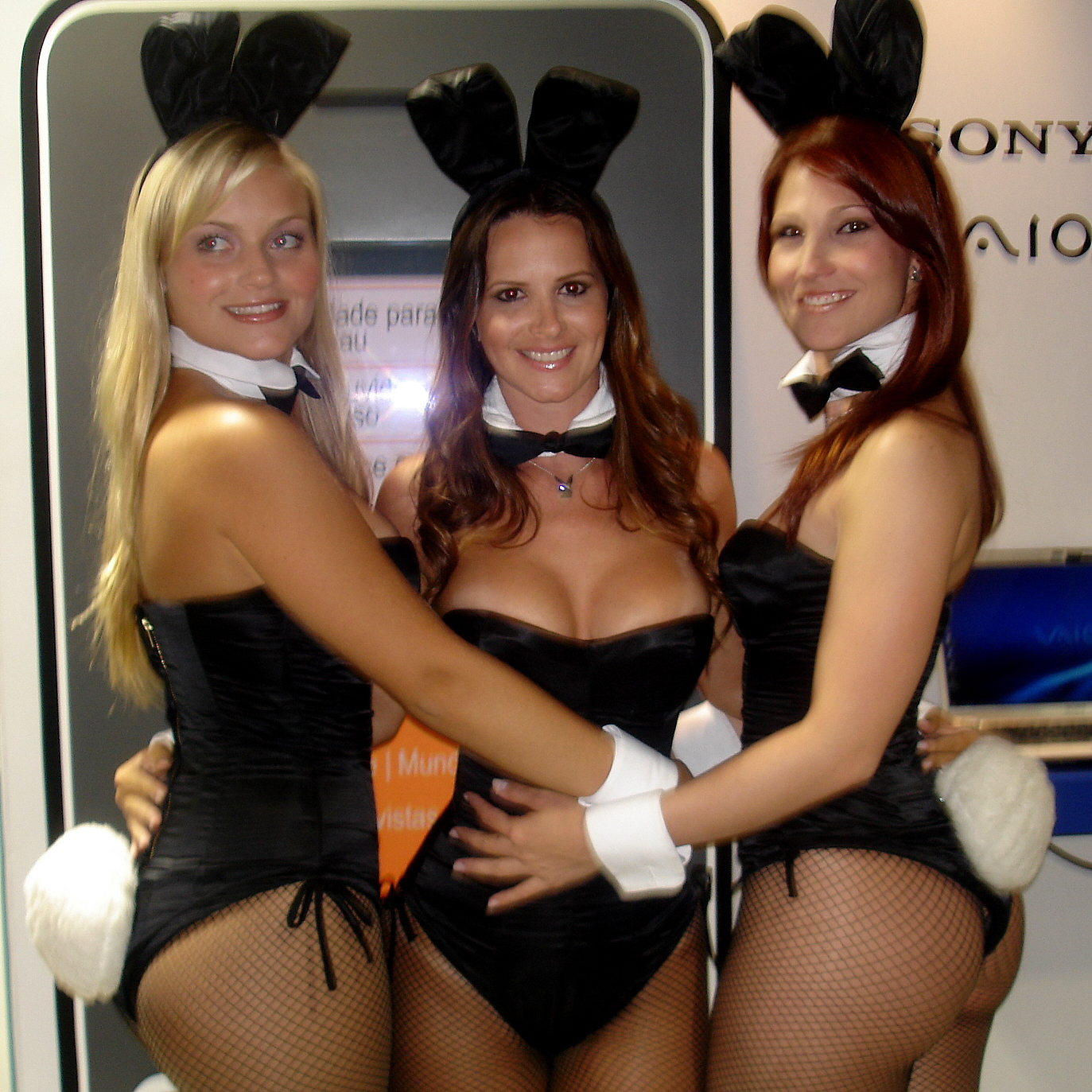
Playboy Bunnies Thaiz, Márcia and Ana Lucia, cover for December 2008.

Issue	Cover	Date
294	Vera Fischer (2/2)	January 2000
295	Ana Paula Teixeira	February 2000
296	Tiazinha (Suzana Alves) (2/2)	March 2000
297	Alessandra Negrini	April 2000
298	Luciana Coutinho	May 2000
299	As Loiras do Axé Blond (Axé Blond's blondes) (Daniela Almeida, Gizelle Maritan and Thais Gattolin)	June 2000
300	Vanessa Schutz	July 2000
301	Feiticeira (Joana Prado) (2/3)	August 2000
302	Helen Ganzarolli	September 2000
303	Andreia Baptista	October 2000
304	Scheila Carvalho (3/5)	November 2000
305	Carla Perez (3/3)	December 2000
306	Luize Altenhofen (1/2)	January 2001
307	Vanessa Menga	February 2001
308	Dany Bananinha (1/2)	March 2001
309	Proibida do Funk (Ariane Latuf)	April 2001
310	Luma de Oliveira (4/5)	May 2001
311	Mallandrinhas (Elaine Pinheiro, Fabiana Pieroccini, Sara de Oliveira)	June 2001
312	Mônica Carvalho (2/3)	July 2001
313	Michelly Machri	August 2001
314	Lívia Andrade	September 2001
315	Pamela Anderson	October 2001
316	Ellen Rocche	November 2001
317	Scheila Carvalho (4/5)	December 2001
318	Sheila Mello (3/3)	January 2002
319	Hérica Sanfelice	February 2002
320	As Garotas da Brahma (Brahma Girls) (Camila Corel, Débora Oliveira, Michelline Góis)	March 2002
321	Feiticeira (Joana Prado) (3/3)	April 2002
322	Leka (BBB 1)	May 2002
323	As Garotas da Copa (World Cup girls) (Mônica Frutuoso, Jenifer Leite, Bárbara Gomes, Mariane Lolli, Josiane Senise, Carolina Landel, Bárbara Garcia, Renata Santos, (1/2) Daniele Gomes, Kátia Carabante and Vanessa Silva)	June 2002
324	Franciely Freduzeski	July 2002
325	Deborah Secco (2/2)	August 2002
326	Manuela Saadeh (BBB 2)	September 2002
327	Janaína dos Santos	October 2002
328	Syang	November 2002
329	Kelly Key	December 2002
330	Thaís Ventura (BBB 2)	January 2003
331	Teles twins (Sarah & Deisi)	February 2003
332	Joseane de Oliveira (BBB 3, former Miss Brasil)	March 2003
333	Helô (2/2) and Ticiane Pinheiro	April 2003
334	Sabrina Sato (BBB 3) (1/2)	May 2003
335	Viviane Bordin	June 2003
336	Maryeva Oliveira	July 2003
337	Regiane Alves	August 2003
338	Babi	September 2003
339	Danielle Winits (2/2)	October 2003
340	Felinas (The "Felines") (Antonela Avellaneda (1/2) and Danielle Souza)	November 2003
341	Luciana Vendramini (2/2)	December 2003
342	Dora Vergueiro	January 2004
343	Antonela Avellaneda (BBB 4) (2/2)	February 2004
344	Dany Bananinha (2/2)	March 2004
345	Lívia Lemos	April 2004
346	Juliana Paes	May 2004
347	Campeãs de Bodyboarding(Bodyboarding Champions) (Naara Carolyne and Lorraine Lima)	June 2004
348	Pietra Ferrari	July 2004
349	Mel Lisboa	August 2004
350	Sandra Andrade	September 2004
351	Daniela Cecconello	October 2004
352	Luíza Tomé (2/2)	November 2004
353	Sabrina Sato (2/2)	December 2004
354	Luma de Oliveira (5/5)	January 2005
355	Bárbara Borges (1/2)	February 2005
356	Ana de Biase	March 2005
357	Natália Nara	April 2005
358	Flávia Monteiro	May 2005
359	Anna Flávia	June 2005
360	Diana Bouth	July 2005
361	Keyla Polizello	July 2005
362	Grazi Massafera	August 2005
363	Viviane Victorette	September 2005
364	Camilla Amaral	October 2005
365	Mariana Kupfer	November 2005
366	Fernanda Paes Leme	December 2005
367	Roberta Foster	January 2006
368	Tânia Oliveira	February 2006
369	Rita Guedes	March 2006
370	Roberta Brasil	April 2006
371	Estela Pereira	May 2006
372	Angelita Feijó	June 2006
373	Mariana Felício	July 2006
374	Flávia Alessandra(1/2)	August 2006
375	Os Aviões da Varig ("Varig's Flight attendants") (Juliana Neves, Sabrina Knop and Patrícia Kreusburg)	September 2006
376	Luize Altenhofen (2/2)	October 2006
377	Danielle Sobreira	November 2006
378	Ana Paula Leme & Carol Sica	November 2006
379	Karina Bacchi	December 2006
380	Andrea Lopes	January 2007
381	Gracyanne Barbosa	February 2007
382	Eloah Uzeda	March 2007
383	Fani Pacheco (BBB 7) (1/2)	April 2007
384	Carol Honório	May 2007
385	Mirella Santos	June 2007
386	Ana Paula Oliveira	July 2007
387	Íris Stefanelli	August 2007
388	Bárbara Paz	September 2007
389	Mônica Veloso	October 2007
390	Casseta & Planeta Girls; Nayara Tecia, Caroline-Laure Dislaire and Jackie Nascimento	November 2007
391	Juliana Knust	December 2007
392	Letícia Carlos	January 2008
393	Mônica Carvalho (3/3)	February 2008
394	Jaque Khury	March 2008
395	Cibele Dorsa	April 2008
396	Juliana Góes	May 2008
397	Andressa Soares – "Watermelon Woman" (1/2)	June 2008
398	Natália Casassola (1/2)	July 2008
399	Carol Castro	August 2008
400	Gyselle Soares	September 2008
401	Ana Paula Tabalipa	October 2008
402	Cláudia Ohana (2/2)	November 2008
403	Thaíz Schmitt (1/3), Márcia Spézia, Ana Lúcia (Bunnies)	December 2008
404	Viviane Bordin	January 2009
405	Jéssica Maia	February 2009
406	Michelle Costa	March 2009
407	Scheila Carvalho (5/5)	April 2009
408	Josiane Oliveira	May 2009
409	Francine Piaia	June 2009
410	Andressa Soares – "Watermelon Woman" (2/2)	July 2009
411	Priscila Pires	August 2009
412	Bárbara Borges (2/2)	September 2009
413	Juliana Alves	October 2009
414	Fernanda Young	November 2009
415	Flávia Alessandra(2/2)	December 2009

== 2010s ==
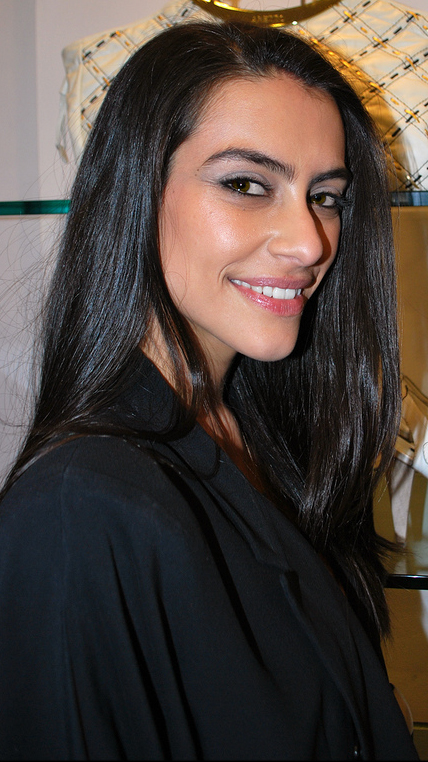
Actress Cléo Pires posed for the August 2010 issue.

Issue	Cover	Date
416	Juju Salimeni (1/2)	January 2010
417	Renata Santos (2/2)	February 2010
418	Tessália Serighelli	March 2010
419	Cacau Colucci	April 2010
420	Maroca (Anamara Barreira)	May 2010
421	Lia Khey (Lia Kheireddine)	June 2010
422	Mônica Apor	July 2010
423	Cléo Pires	August 2010
424	Larissa Riquelme	September 2010
425	Nicole Bahls	October 2010
426	Fani Pacheco (2/2) & Natália Casassola (2/2)	November 2010
427	Letícia Birkheuer	December 2010
428	Andressa Ribeiro	January 2011
429	Dany Giehl	February 2011
430	Michelly Pereira (BBB 11)	March 2011
431	Babi Rossi	April 2011
432	Jaqueline Faria	May 2011
433	Maria Melilo	June 2011
434	Michaela Matejkova & Alicia Seffras	July 2011
435	Adriane Galisteu (2/2)	August 2011
436	Adriana Santana (BBB 11)	September 2011
437	Desirée Oliveira	October 2011
438	Cacau Colucci (2/2)	November 2011
439	Bárbara Evans	December 2011
440	Vanessa Zotth; Lindsay Lohan	January 2012
441	Jéssica Amaral	February 2012
442	Valentina Francavilla	March 2012
443	Aryane Steinkopf	April 2012
444	Renata Dávila (BBB 12)	May 2012
445	Aline Riscado	June 2012
446	Mari Paraíba	July 2012
447	Nathália Rodrigues	August 2012
448	Denise Rocha	September 2012
449	Leona Cavalli	October 2012
450	Karen Kounrouzan	November 2012
451	Débora Tubino & Denise Tubino	December 2012
452	Catarina Migliorini	January 2013
453	Bianca Borba	February 2013
454	Carol Narizinho	March 2013
455	Thaís Bianca	April 2013
456	Girls from Casa Bonita (Bianca Leão, Thaíz Schmitt (2/3), Alice Ramos, Monique Maciel)	May 2013
457	Tamara Ecclestone	June 2013
458	Antônia Fontenelle	July 2013
459	Nanda Costa	August 2013
460	Aline Franzoi	September 2013
461	Pietra Príncipe	October 2013
462	Meyrielle Abrantes	November 2013
463	Thaíz Schmitt (3/3)	December 2013
464	Beach Beauties (Aricia Silva, Fernanda Lacerda,(1/2) Veridiana Freitas(1/2)); Kate Moss	January 2014
465	Aline Prado	February 2014
466	Mari Silvestre	March 2014
467	Gaby Fontenelle; Ana Paula Maciel	April 2014
468	Amanda Gontijo	May 2014
469	Patrícia Jordane	June 2014
470	Vanessa Mesquita	July 2014
471	Jéssika Alves	August 2014
472	Natália Inoue	September 2014
473	Fernanda Lacerda(2/2)	October 2014
474	Marcela Pignatari	November 2014
475	Lola Melnick	December 2014
476	Taiana Camargo	January 2015
477	Nuelle Alves	February 2015
478	Tatiane Cravinho	March 2015
479	Veridiana Freitas(2/2)	April 2015
480	Ivi Pizzott	May 2015
481	Janaína Freitas	June 2015
482	Tati Zaqui	July 2015
483	40 year special	August 2015
484	Rita Mattos	September 2015
485	Iara Ramos	October 2015
486	Cintia Vallentim	November 2015
487	Lu Ferreira	December 2015
488	Luana Piovani	April 2016
489	Viviane Orth	May 2016
490	Marina Dias	June\July 2016
491	Pathy Dejesus	August\September 2016
492	Nyvi Estephan	October\November 2016
493	Gabriela Rippi; Fluvia Lacerda	Summer 2017
494	Letícia Datena	Autumn 2017
495	Renata Longaray	Winter 2017
496	Juju Salimeni(2/2); Ariana Martins	Spring 2017
497	Playboy Bunnies	Summer 2018
