= É o Tchan! =

Brazilian pagoge band

É o Tchan! is a axé band from Salvador, Bahia, Brazil that started in 1992.

== History ==
Originally called Gera Samba, they debuted with their hit single Segura o Tchan. Their first album, called É o Tchan (1995), sold triple platinum.

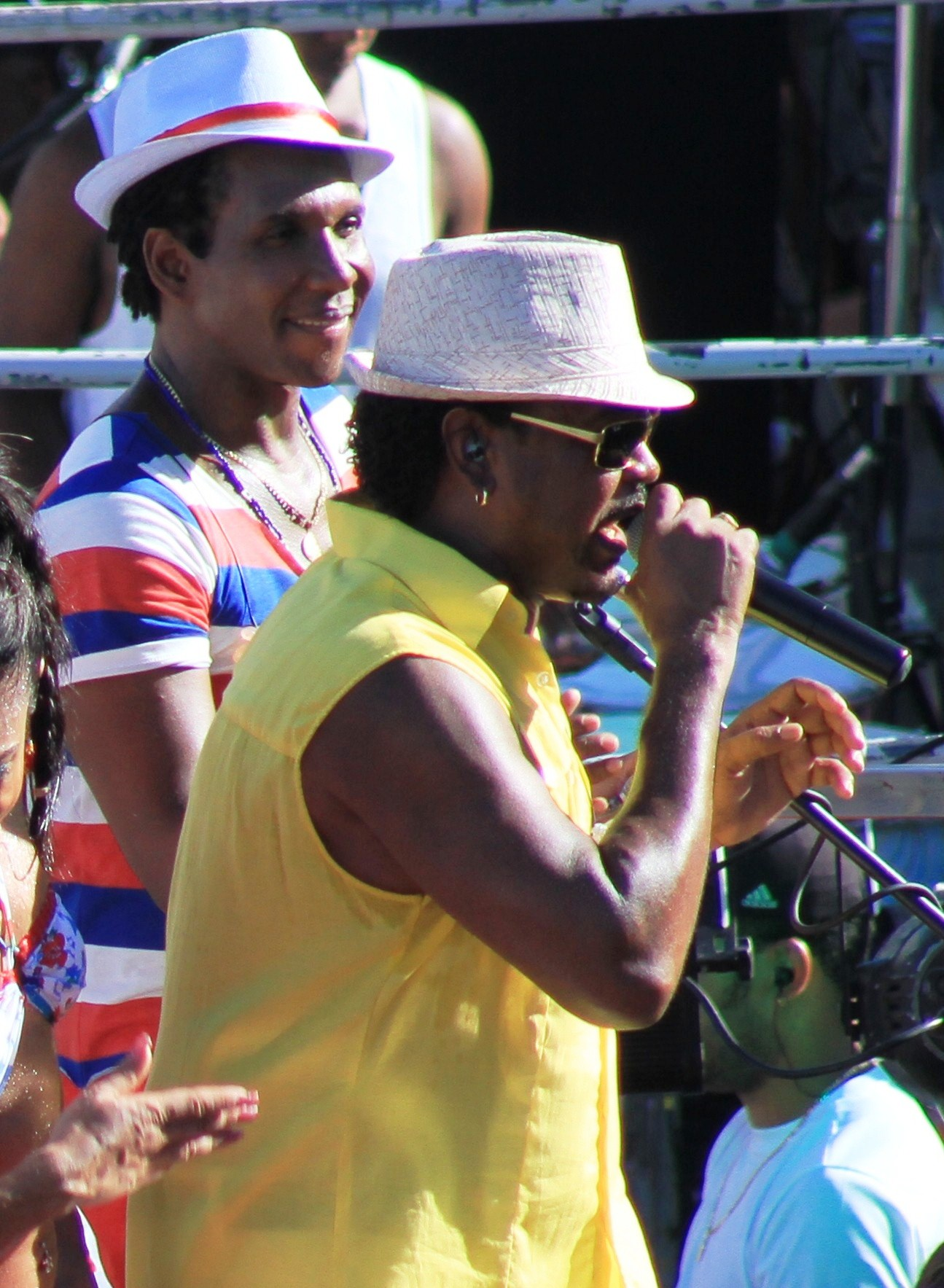
É o Tchan in 2011

After legal problems, the name of the band changed from Gera Samba to É o Tchan, and with this name, they released the album Na Cabeça e na Cintura (In the Head and in the Waist), a reference to one of their signature dance moves.

The group became popular because of the combination of catchy melody and simple lyrics, with choreography performed by two dancers, a blonde (loira do Tchan) and a brunette (morena do Tchan). Both became big stars and did Playboy Brasil covers, with the Carla Perez cover being the bestselling until 1999, when the Tiazinha and Feiticeira issues outsold her. The brunette dancer, Scheila Carvalho, was also a big star. Both dancers wore little tops and bootie shorts. The male dancer from the beginning to 2007 was Afro-Brazilian Edson Cardoso, also known as Alligator (Jacaré).

Carla Perez was very popular among kids and teenagers, and so was the group. Many licensed products were released under her image, such as costumes, sticker albums and bootie shorts. There was controversy when the highly eroticized lyrics and choreography became popular among children and children's dancing contests.

Their 1996 album was the best-selling of the year, selling over 2 million copies in Brazil, and in 1997 they released another huge hit, the album É o Tchan do Brasil. The album sold, again, over 2 million copies and was the best-selling of the year. It was released after the brunette dancer left the group and an audition took place on the highest-rated Sunday show in Brazil, the Domingão do Faustão. Soon after the release, Carla Perez decided to leave the group and start a solo career, and again another audition took place on Domingão do Faustão. The first prize was, aside from becoming a member of the group, the cover of Playboy Brasil.

Their fourth album, third as É o Tchan, garnered less success than their previous albums, though it still achieved a diamond certification. The CD, after É o Tchan do Brasil (It's Tchan from Brasil), was called É o Tchan no Havai (It's Tchan in Hawaii). Their next album also received diamond certification, É o Tchan na Selva (It's Tchan in the Jungle) and that was their last album to become certified diamond. After that, the group's popularity gradually decreased, with most of the members leaving for other groups or musical styles.

The lineup has changed three times since then and they have released two other albums and a compilation, in 2000, 2001 and 2003, respectively. The group released, in 2005, a 10 Year Celebratory DVD which was certified triple platinum. Morenas and loiras of the group maintain the tradition of posing nude for men's magazines but, after their peak, less popular Revista Sexy has replaced Playboy Brasil in their preferences: Silmara Miranda (October 2003), Scheila Carvalho (October 2005), Aline Rosado & Juliane Almeida (February 2006).

== Members ==
period	vocals 1	vocals 2	male dancer	blond female dancer	brunette female dancer
Original Lineup	Beto Jamaica	Compadre Washington	Jacaré	Carla Perez	Débora Brasil
Lineup by year 1998	Beto Jamaica	Compadre Washington	Jacaré	Sheila Mello	Scheila Carvalho
Lineup by year 2005	Beto Jamaica; Tony Salles	Compadre Washington; Renatinho da Bahia	Jacaré	Silmara Miranda	Scheila Carvalho
Lineup by year 2010	Beto Jamaica	Compadre Washington		Gabriella Zecchinelli; Alessandra Quintino; Karol Loren	Juliane Almeida; Julie Pinho; Juliana Chocolate

Morenas who replaced Scheila Carvalho:

Aline Rosado (2005 - 2009)
Juliane Almeida (2005 - )

== Discography ==
Studio albums

- É o Tchan (1995)
- Na Cabeça e na Cintura (1996)
- É o Tchan do Brasil (1997)
- É o Tchan no Hawaí (1998)
- É o Tchan na Selva (1999)
- Tchan.com.br (2000)
- Funk do Tchan (2001)
- Turma do Batente (2001)
- Ligado em 220V (2003)
- Desafio do Manequim (2017)
