= Sheila Mello =

Brazilian dancer, actress and model (born 1978)

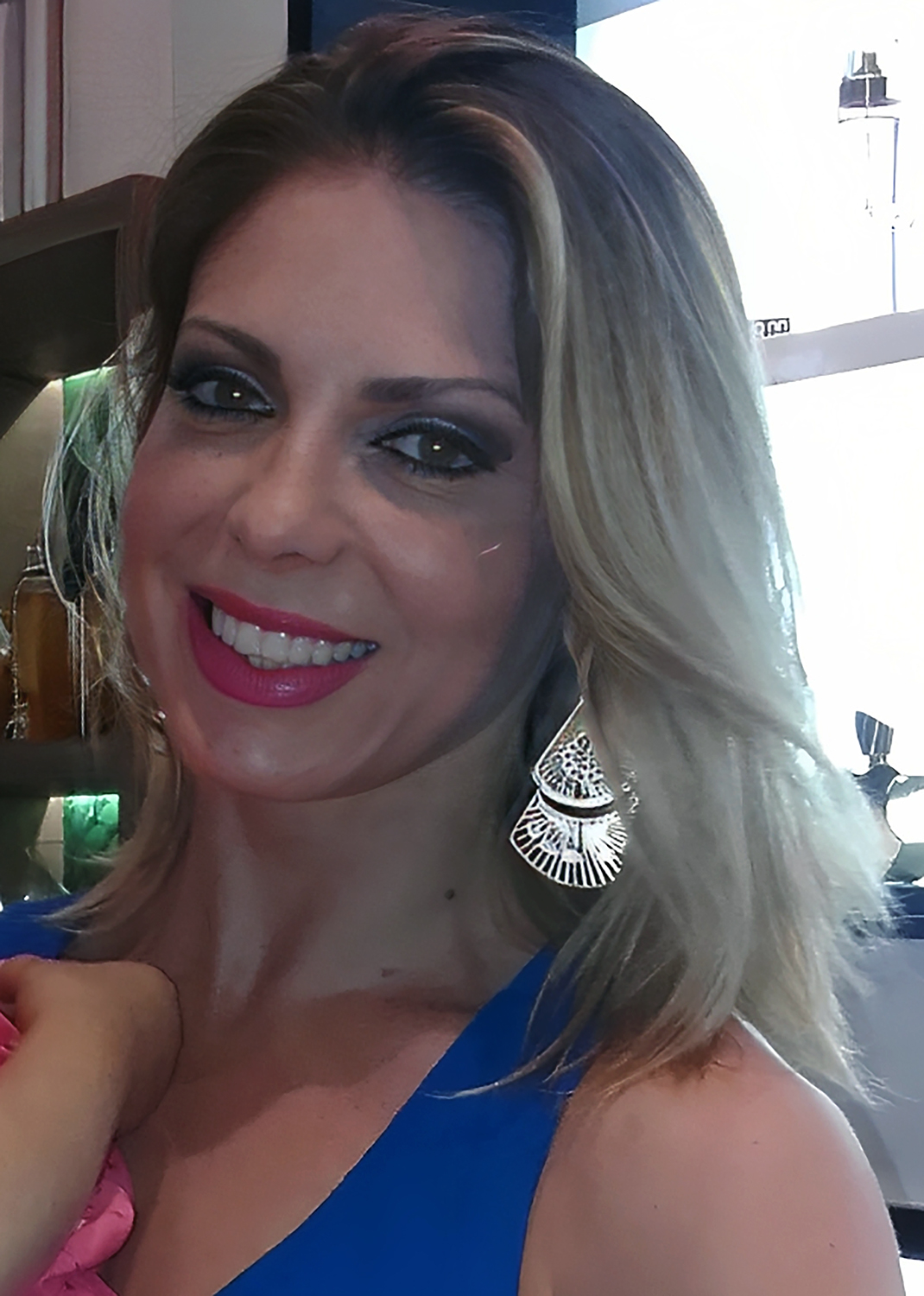
- Sheila Mello at an event in December 2015
- Born: Sheila Chesed de Almeida Mello; July 23, 1978 (age 48); São Paulo, Brazil
- Spouse: Fernando Scherer (m. 2010-2018)
- Children: 1
- Modeling information
- Height: 1.70 m (5 ft 7 in)
- Hair color: Blonde
- Eye color: Green
- Website: www.sheilamello.com.br

Sheila Chesed de Almeida Mello (born July 23, 1978) is a Brazilian dancer, actress and model. She became famous for dancing in the band É o Tchan!

== Biography ==
Sheila was born in Cidade Ademar, a district on the outskirts of São Paulo. Before becoming known for her participation in the group É o Tchan!, She graduated in both classical ballet and in modern ballet.

Her entry to the group É o Tchan! came in 1998 through a contest held to choose a replacement for the dancer Carla Perez who had left the group. Immediately after her victory she posed nude for the first time in Playboy magazine. She was on the cover in the other two editions, one next to Scheila Carvalho, her colleague É o Tchan!. In October 2007, she posed naked again, this time for the magazine Sexy.

In 2009, she participated of the second season of the Brazilian reality show, A Fazenda. During the competition, she met her future husband, the former swimmer Fernando Scherer. They married on July 24, 2010. In August 2018, Mello announced her separation from Scherer. She is a São Paulo FC fan.

== Movies ==
- 2007: Alphaville 2007 d.C
- 2007: Segurança Nacional

== Theater ==
- Herótica - Cartilha Feminina Para Homens Machos (direction: Darson Ribeiro)
- Caldé e os Peixes Que Aprendem a Nadar no Ar (direction: Marcelo Lazzaratti)
- Gretta Garbo Quem Diria, Acabou no Irajá (direction: Hilton Have)
- O Santo e a Porca (direction: Ednaldo Freire)
- Viúva, Porém Honesta (direction: Fábio Marcof)
- A Invasão (direction: Gabriel Carmona)
- Caminhos da Independência
- Uma Empregada Quase Perfeita (direction: Mirian Lins)
- 2/4 no Motel (direction: Flávio Colatrello)

== Television ==
- 2009: A Fazenda 2
- 2025: The Masked Singer Brasil (cosplayed as Raquel from Mulheres de Areia)
