= Xuxa Requebra =

1999 film directed by Tizuka Yamasaki

- Promotional poster
- Directed by: Tizuka Yamasaki
- Written by: Eliana Fonseca; Cristiana Mesquita; Evandro Mesquita; Vivian Perl; Alexandre Roit; Beatriz Sanson; Wagner de Assis
- Produced by: Diler Trindade
- Starring: Xuxa Meneghel; Daniel; Elke Maravilha; Vitor Hugo; Yara Lins
- Cinematography: Cezar Moraes
- Music by: Mu Carvalho
- Production companies: Xuxa Produções; Diler & Associados; 20th Century Fox
- Distributed by: Fox Film do Brasil
- Release date: December 17, 1999
- Running time: 90 minutes
- Country: Brazil
- Language: Portuguese
- Box office: $4.17 million

Xuxa Requebra (English: Xuxa - Shake it Up!) is a 1999 Brazilian musical romantic comedy film directed by Tizuka Yamasaki, with final script by Evandro Mesquita. His cast includes Brazilian singer, TV host and actress Xuxa Meneghel, singer Daniel and Elke Maravilha as protagonists of the story, as well as the participation of countless Brazilian artists such as Carla Perez, Luciano Huck and Fat Family.

Requebra was 20th Century Fox's first Brazilian co-production and debuted in theaters on December 17, 1999. The show was watched by approximately 2,074,461 viewers and earned more than 8 million reais for its producers, according to Ancine.

== Plot ==
The Dance Academy Two Hearts, where Nena (Xuxa Meneghel) studied, is in danger. The terrible Macedonian (Elke Maravilha), an inveterate smoker, bandit and businessman with the facade of a businesswoman, intends to take advantage of the academy's bad financial situation to take over its facilities. But there is hope: the Requebra 2000 contest, the Millennium dance tournament, which takes place in Rio de Janeiro, and has a sponsor willing to give a large prize money that would solve the problem of the academy. To win the tournament, the group has the indispensable help of Nena, a former student of the academy and now a journalist of the famous daily Hora X. But Macedon is responsible for his stepson Felipe (Daniel), to hire professional dancers to beat them ruthlessly. In addition, he has Guto (Vitor Hugo) as his spy and uses his clumsy henchmen to sabotage the staff of the Dance Academy during the qualifiers.

== Cast ==
- Xuxa Meneghel as a Nena (Helena)
- Daniel as a Felipe Macedo
- Elke Maravilha as a Macedão (Iare Macedo)
- Yara Lins as a Dona Laura
- Vitor Hugo as a Guto
- Alice Borges as a Bárbara
- Pedro Kling as a Pedrinho
- Ricardo Blat as a Writing head
- Márcia de Oliveira as a Lurdinha
- Evandro Mesquita as a PJ
- Andréa Veiga as an Andréa
- Cláudio Heinrich as a Cláudio
- Andréia Faria (Sorvetão) as an Andréa
- Marcelo Faustini as a Marcelo
- Tiazinha as a Motogirl #1
- Luciano Huck as a Presenter of Requebra 2000
- Carla Perez as a Motogirl #2
- Sérgio Loroza as a Barman
- Feiticeira as a Girl from the Requebra 2000 awards
- Vinny as a popcorn seller
- Adriana Bombom as an Adriana
- Claudinho e Buchecha as a Masons
- Graziella Schmitt as a student
- Fly as a student
- Ana Paula Almeida as a student
- Kadu as an aluno
- Gisele Delaia as a student
- Kall as a student
- Tom as a student
- Andrezza Cruz as a student
- Vitor Mihailoff as a Vitor (Macedonian capuchin)
- Carlinhos de Jesus as a traffic cop
- Maurício Souza Lima as a boss of the henchmen
- Aisha Jambo as a student
- Gilberto Hernandez as a Gil (Macedonian capuchin)
- Ed Oliveira as an Ed (Macedonian capuchin)
- Bira Xavier as a Bira (Macedonian capuchin)
- Eduardo Reis as an Eduardo (Macedonian capuchin)
- Mikele Kegler as a Mikele (Macedonian capuchin)
- Márcio Mariante as a student
- Fat Family as a Macedonian capuchin
- Johnson Teixeira as a student
- Arnaldo Klay as a student
- Carla Visi as a Commissioner of Police
- Terra Samba as a Car Washers
- Breno Moroni as a student father
- Lissa Diniz as a Ballet dancer
- Marcelo Portinari as a Brutamontes
- Monalisa Lins as a Dona Laura (young)
- Pedro Diniz as a student
- Ágata Jornoorki as a Nena (baby)
- Felipe Lima as a boy listening to the radio
- Kristie Miyamoto as a Lin Din
- Naina Yamasaki as a student
- Manuela Pontes de Mesquita as a student
- Luana Kummerle as a student
- Paquitas 2000 as a student
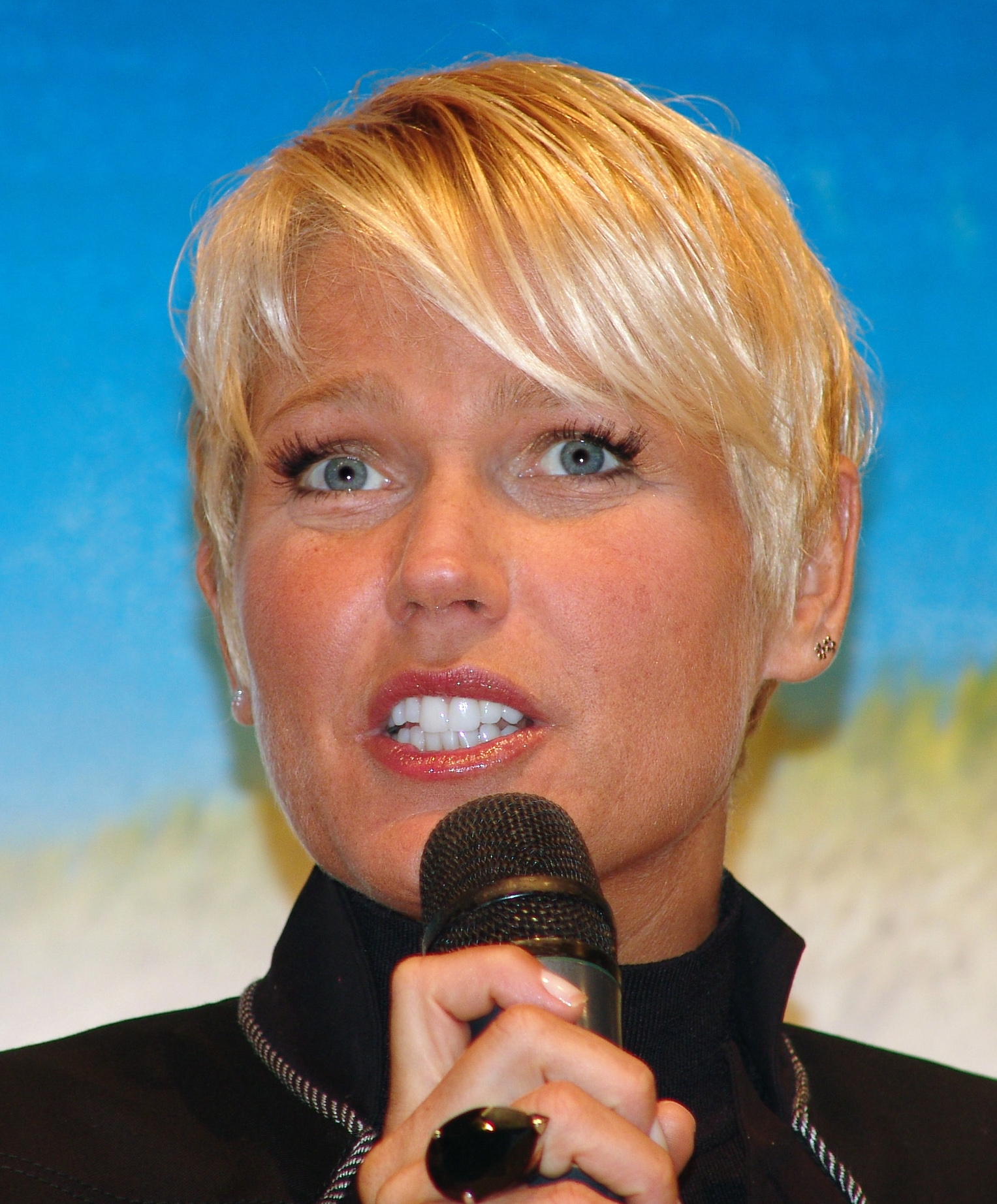
Xuxa

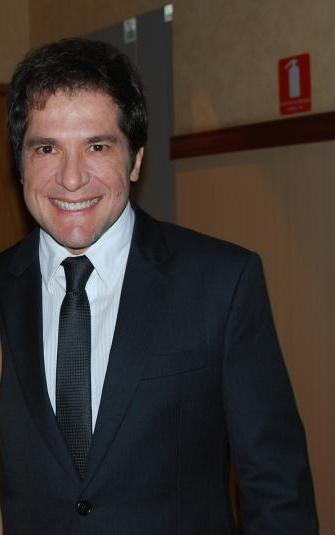
Daniel

== Music ==
The soundtrack of the film of the same name, released in 1999 by Som Livre and Globo/Universal. The album consists of songs performed by the protagonist, the Brazilian presenter Xuxa Meneghel and other artists. The soundtrack to the film "Xuxa Requebra" was released in late 1999 shortly after the release of the film. The soundtrack brings various artists such as Fat Family, Claudinho & Buchecha, Daniel, Mú Carvalho and You Can Dance. The booklet is simple, without letters, only with the credits. Fat Family's version of the song "Chegou a Festa" is different from the group's CD version. And the song "Mãe é uma Só", also of Fat Family, is the version of the reduction of the film that was not used.

Xuxa Requebra
- Xuxa Requebra original score album cover art

Soundtrack album by Xuxa Meneghel
- Released: 1999
- Genre: Pop
- Length: 87:00
- Label: Som Livre; Globo/Universal

Track listing – CD edition
No.	Title	Writer(s)	Performer(s)	Length
1.	"Requebra"	Vinny	Vinny	3:22
2.	"No Ponto Pra Mim"	Peninha; Elias Muniz	Daniel	4:37
3.	"Efeito Dominó"	Sullivan; Dudu Falcão	Xuxa	4:26
4.	"Só o Nosso Amor"	Sullivan; Dudu Falcão	Solange; Massadas	4:20
5.	"Mãe é Uma só"	Nelita Oliveira Cipriano	Fat Family	2:10
6.	"Chegou a Festa"	Tapajos E.M.I	Fat Family	4:10
7.	"Xereta"	Cacá Moraes; Abdullah	Claudinho & Buchecha	3:38
8.	"Banho de Chuveiro"	Paulo Chamuska; Julinho Carioca; Lazinho do Pandeiro; Cabo Rei	Terra Samba	3:44
9.	"Uh! Tiazinha"	Vinny	Tiazinha	3:32
10.	"Cheiro de Festa"	Edu Casanova; Tenison Del Rey	Banda Cheiro de Amor	4:23
11.	"Pela Beira do Mar"	Mú Carvalho; Marcio Tucunduva	Mú Carvalho
12.	"Bota o Bumbum Pra Dançar"	Kadu; Kall	You Can Dance	4:38
13.	"Dois Corações"	Mú Carvalho	Mú Carvalho
14.	"Tango Street Macedão"	Mú Carvalho	Mú Carvalho
Total length:				87:00

== Reception ==
The film Xuxa Requebra made the highest grossing of a national film, in the first week of exhibition, in the 1990s in the country. The film was watched by approximately 2,074,461 spectators and earned more than 8 million reais for its producers, according to Ancine.

== Critical reception ==
Xuxa Requebra received generally negative from critics. Clara A of website AdoroCinema was negative in her film critique, giving a star of five, The critical consensus of the site says: And so is Xuxa in the cinema: with a simple and predictable story that wins the taste of children, even more with the artists who were famous at the time. I felt in the true show of freshmen of Chacrinha. She also criticized the excess of singers who participated in the cast of the film saying: Every 20 minutes someone comes to Xuxa Break up someone to sing and make a point in the film, to increase even more success. Okay, that was nice at the time and it's a lot of relief, but calm down. She also criticized the couple formed by Xuxa and the singer Daniel saying: Not before, nor now nor at any time, Daniel was a gallant of something. And it's still the romantic pair of Xuxa. Appeal, is not it?.

The critic of the site Folha de S.Paulo, was also negative in relation to the excess of participation of artists in the cast saying: "Xuxa Requebra" is less a movie and another commercial of two hours in duration. Basic concepts of cinema, such as history and narrative, do not seem to matter much. The goal is to squeeze as much merchandising as possible on the screen and advertise "TV" musicians and "celebrities" hired from the Xuxa company. He defined the film as "Inaugurated the cinema of accountant" For him "There is no script, but a bad sequence of scenes, written in a hurry to give each friend of Xuxa his 15 seconds (it's a lot of people!) fame." He also criticized the script and the dialogue defining them as "bland" questioning "Can not anyone write something better than" if we win the contest, I promise to stay a year without eating popcorn "or" I thought it was 15 o'clock in the afternoon"?, The little humor of the film is totally involuntary and in bad taste".

Ruy Gardnier of the Portal Contratempo wrote that the film 'is a disgusting "Manichaeism, a pamphlet that more mystifies than it informs (and it must be admitted that just what today's youth lack is information), an uplifting discourse that always reaches maximum happiness in the end." for the critic, the phrase that most resonates at the end is "That was the choreography of the beating", is a sad and inconsequential flattery of the much-health-few-nerves generation, for whom, by the way, it seems that the film was made. He ended the assessment by saying that Xuxa Requebra is "the cavernous portrait of the health generation, and arrogating the right to make moral of the decisions of others with the pseudointuito to educate the children against drugs, against the cigarette ends up doing the times of prejudice, of pure capitalism (that tries to criticize), of the "bruise" and the magnificent life of the young healed dancing to the sound of Vinny's "Requebra" and being moved to the sound of the litanies of Daniel".

== International release ==
Fox planned to launch the Requebra in July 2000 in Argentina, as far as we know the project has not gone out of print.

== See also ==
- List of Brazilian films of the 1990s
