= Esse Artista Sou Eu =

- Genre: Reality competition
- Presented by: Marcio Ballas
- Judges: Thomas Roth; Cyz; Carlos Eduardo Miranda
- Country of origin: Brazil
- No. of seasons: 1
- No. of episodes: 18

Production
- Camera setup: Multiple camera
- Running time: 60 minutes

Original release
- Network: SBT
- Release: August 25 – December 22, 2014

Esse Artista Sou Eu (English: That Artist Is Me) is a Brazilian reality television singing competition based on the Spanish series Your Face Sounds Familiar, hosted by Marcio Ballas.

The show involved seven celebrities (actors, comedians, singers and musicians) portraying various iconic singers each week to win the R$50.000 prize.

The series premiered on Monday, August 25, 2014 at 11:30 p.m. (BRT / AMT) on SBT. On December 22, Vanessa Jackson won the competition over Li Martins, Christian Chávez and Marcelo Augusto, who took second, third and fourth respectively.

On April 23, 2017, Rede Globo rebooted the series as Show dos Famosos, airing as a 1-hour segment during Domingão do Faustão.

== Contestants ==
Celebrity	Notability (known for)	Status
Syang	Musician & erotic writer	Eliminated on December 15, 2014
Leo Maia	Tim Maia's son & singer	Eliminated on December 15, 2014
Rosemary	Singer	Eliminated on December 15, 2014
Marcelo Augusto	Singer & actor	Fourth place on December 22, 2014
Christian Chávez	RBD singer & actor	Third place on December 22, 2014
Li Martins	Rouge singer & actress	Runner-up on December 22, 2014
Vanessa Jackson	Singer	Winner on December 22, 2014

== Elimination chart ==
	1	2	3	4	5	6	7	8	9	10	11	12	13	14	15	16	17	18
Billy Preston	1st 50	3rd 69	1st 113															
Janis Ian	4th 26	5th 49	5th 72															
Valri Bromfield	2nd 37	1st 79	3rd 104															
John Belushi	3rd 30	4th 52	6th-7th 67															
George Carlin	6th 21	6th 44	4th 80															
Don Pardo	7th 20	8th 39	8th 51															
Andy Kaufman	5th 22	2nd 71	2nd 110															
Albert Brooks	8th 17	7th 43	6th-7th 67															

Key
Eliminated
Fourth place
Third place
Runner-up
Winner

== Live show details ==
=== Week 1 ===
Aired: August 25, 2014

Celebrity	Performing as	Song	Scores	Extra points		Results	
Celebrity	Performing as	Song	Scores	Vote	Bonus	Night total	Night rank
Marcelo Augusto	Sidney Magal	"Sandra Rosa Madalena"	23 (7, 8, 8)	(5); Rosemary	0	23	4th
Li Martins	Amy Winehouse	"Rehab"	22 (8, 7, 7)	(5); Syang	0	22	5th
Christian Chávez	Ricky Martin	"Livin' La Vida Loca"	17 (6, 6, 5)	(5); Leo	0	17	6th
Rosemary	Hebe Camargo	"Você Não Sabe"	30 (10, 10, 10)	(5); Vanessa	15	45	1st
Vanessa Jackson	Whitney Houston	"I Will Always Love You"	27 (9, 9, 9)	(5); Rosemary	5	32	2nd
Leo Maia	Seu Jorge	"Burguesinha"	12 (4, 4, 4)	(5); Syang	5	17	7th
Syang	Axl Rose	"Sweet Child o' Mine"	17 (5, 6, 6)	(5); Rosemary	10	26	3rd

=== Week 2 ===
Aired: September 2, 2014

Celebrity	Performing as	Song	Scores	Extra points		Results	
Celebrity	Performing as	Song	Scores	Vote	Bonus	Night total	Night rank
Li Martins	Anitta	"Show das Poderosas"	21 (8, 8, 5)	(5); Leo	0	21	4th
Rosemary	Carmen Miranda	"Chica-Chica-Bum-Chic"	19 (7, 6, 6)	(5); Marcelo	0	19	5th
Marcelo Augusto	Elvis Presley	"Blue Suede Shoes"	13 (4, 5, 4)	(5); Leo	5	18	6th
Vanessa Jackson	Whoopi Goldberg	"Oh Happy Day"	21 (6, 7, 8)	(5); Leo	5	26	3rd
Leo Maia	Ray Charles	"Hit the Road Jack"	30 (10, 10, 10)	(5); Vanessa	25	55	1st
Syang	Wanderléa	"Pare o Casamento"	16 (5, 4, 7)	(5); Leo	0	16	7th
Christian Chávez	Village People	"Y.M.C.A."/"Macho Man"	27 (9, 9, 9)	(5); Leo	0	27	2nd

=== Week 3 ===
Aired: September 9, 2014

Celebrity	Performing as	Song	Scores	Extra points		Results	
Celebrity	Performing as	Song	Scores	Vote	Bonus	Night total	Night rank
Syang	—		12 (4, 4, 4)	(5) —	0	12	7th
Vanessa Jackson	Kaoma	"Chorando Se Foi"	16 (6, 5, 5)	(5); Li	0	16	6th
Leo Maia	Tim Maia	"Me Dê Motivo"	25 (7, 8, 10)	(5); Rosemary	5	30	3rd
Li Martins	Rihanna	"Where Have You Been"	22 (9, 7, 6)	(5); Christian	10	32	2nd
Marcelo Augusto	Cher	"Believe"	27 (8, 10, 9)	(5); Leo	0	27	4th
Rosemary	Elis Regina	"Madalena"	18 (5, 6, 7)	(5); Christian	0	18	5th
Christian Chávez	Justin Timberlake	"SexyBack"	27 (10, 9, 8)	(5); Li	10	37	1st

=== Week 4 ===
Aired: September 16, 2014

Celebrity	Performing as	Song	Scores	Extra points		Results	
Celebrity	Performing as	Song	Scores	Vote	Bonus	Night total	Night rank
Christian Chávez	Psy	"Gangnam Style"	20 (6, 8, 6)	(5); Vanessa	5	25	5th
Leo Maia	Jair Rodrigues	"Deixa Isso Pra Lá"	12 (4, 4, 4)	(5); Rosemary	5	17	7th
Syang	Britney Spears	"Toxic"	22 (8, 7, 7)	(5); Li	5	27	3rd
Li Martins	Conchita Wurst	"Rise Like a Phoenix"	28 (9, 9, 10)	(5); Christian	5	33	2nd
Marcelo Augusto	Beto Barbosa	"Adocica"	21 (7, 6, 8)	(5); Syang	5	26	4th
Rosemary	Gal Costa	"Aquarela do Brasil"	15 (5, 5, 5)	(5); Leo	5	20	6th
Vanessa Jackson	Beyoncé	"Crazy in Love"	29 (10, 10, 9)	(5); Marcelo	5	34	1st

=== Week 5 ===
Aired: September 23, 2014

Celebrity	Performing as	Song	Scores	Extra points		Results	
Celebrity	Performing as	Song	Scores	Vote	Bonus	Night total	Night rank
Rosemary	Valesca Popozuda	"Beijinho no Ombro"	27 (8, 9, 10)	(3) Christian (2) Leo	5	32	3rd
Vanessa Jackson	Ana Carolina	"Garganta"	28 (9, 10, 9)	(3) Leo (2) Syang	6	34	1st
Leo Maia	Bruno Mars	"Treasure"	16 (6, 5, 5)	(3) Christian (2) Li	12	28	4th
Christian Chávez	John Lennon	"Imagine"	25 (10, 8, 7)	(3) Rosermary (2) Leo	8	33	2nd
Li Martins	Chiquititas	"Remexe"	16 (4, 4, 8)	(3) Vanessa (2) Leo	2	18	6th
Syang	Angélica	"Vou de Táxi"	19 (7, 6, 6)	(3) Leo (2) Christian	2	21	5th
Marcelo Augusto	Roy Orbison	"Oh, Pretty Woman"	16 (5, 7, 4)	(3) Vanessa (2) Rosemary	0	16	7th

=== Week 6 ===
Aired: September 30, 2014

Celebrity	Performing as	Song	Scores	Extra points		Results	
Celebrity	Performing as	Song	Scores	Vote	Bonus	Night total	Night rank
Leo Maia	Wando	"Fogo & Paixão"	15 (6, 4, 5)	(3) Rosermary (2) Vanessa	2	17	7th
Marcelo Augusto	Andrea Bocelli	"Con te partirò"	23 (8, 8, 7)	(3) Li (2) Christian	10	33	1st
Vanessa Jackson	Jackson 5	"I'll Be There"	27 (9, 9, 9)	(3) Li (2) Marcelo	4	31	3rd
Li Martins	Celine Dion	"My Heart Will Go On"	22 (7, 7, 8)	(3) Marcelo (2) Vanessa	9	31	3rd
Syang	Pink	"Get the Party Started"	16 (4, 6, 6)	(3) Marcelo (2) Christian	3	19	4th
Christian Chávez	Michael Jackson	"Billie Jean"	14 (5, 5, 4)	(3) Li (2) Marcelo	4	18	6th
Rosemary	Dalva de Oliveira	"Bandeira Branca"	30 (10, 10, 10)	(3) Syang (2) Leo	3	33	1st

=== Week 7 ===
Aired: October 6, 2014

Celebrity	Performing as	Song	Scores	Extra points		Results	
Celebrity	Performing as	Song	Scores	Vote	Bonus	Night total	Night rank
Li Martins	Miley Cyrus	"Wrecking Ball"	16 (4, 7, 5)	(3) Christian (2) Syang	8	24	5th
Marcelo Augusto	Cauby Peixoto	"Bastidores"	22 (8, 8, 6)	(3) Vanessa (2) Christian	4	26	4th
Vanessa Jackson	Toni Braxton	"Un-Break My Heart"	28 (9, 10, 9)	(3) Syang (2) Li	5	33	2nd
Syang	Spice Girls	"Wannabe"	17 (5, 5, 7)	(3) Leo (2) Vanessa	5	22	6th
Leo Maia	James Brown	"I Got You (I Feel Good)"	29 (10, 9, 10)	(3) Christian (2) Marcelo	5	34	1st
Christian Chávez	MC Guimê	"Na Pista Eu Arraso"	20 (6, 6, 8)	(3) Li (2) Marcelo	8	28	3rd
Rosemary	Gaby Amarantos	"Ex Mai Love"	15 (7, 4, 4)	(3) Li (2) Leo	0	15	7th

=== Week 8 ===
Aired: October 13, 2014

Celebrity	Performing as	Song	Scores	Extra points		Results	
Celebrity	Performing as	Song	Scores	Vote	Bonus	Night total	Night rank
Leo Maia	Roberto Carlos	"Eu sou Terrível"	14 (5, 5, 4)	(3) Syang (2) Christian	0	14	7th
Marcelo Augusto	Daniel	"Eu me Amarrei"	13 (4, 4, 5)	(3) Li (2) Syang	4	17	6th
Li Martins	Alicia Keys	"Girl on Fire"	25 (8, 10, 7)	(3) Syang (2) Marcelo	8	33	2nd
Vanessa Jackson	Montserrat	"How Can I Go On"	29 (10, 9, 10)	(3) Syang (2) Marcelo	0	29	4th
Rosemary	Virgínia Lane	"Sassaricando"	18 (6, 6, 6)	(3) Christian (2) Syang	0	18	5th
Syang	Prince	"Kiss"	22 (7, 7, 8)	(3) Li (2) Christian	16	38	1st
Christian Chávez	Lady Gaga	"Bad Romance"	26 (9, 8, 9)	(3) Syang (2) Li	7	33	2nd

=== Week 9 ===
Aired: October 20, 2014

Celebrity	Performing as	Song	Scores	Extra points		Results	
Celebrity	Performing as	Song	Scores	Vote	Bonus	Night total	Night rank
Christian Chávez	Luciano Pavarotti	"Caruso"	21 (5, 8, 8)	(5); Li	0	21	4th
Vanessa Jackson	Ivete Sangalo	"Tempo de Alegria"	19 (8, 5, 6)	(5); Marcelo	0	19	5th
Syang	Katy Perry	"California Gurls"	19 (6, 6, 7)	(5); Marcelo	5	24	3rd
Li Martins	Adele	"Someone Like You"	27 (9, 9, 9)	(5); Syang	10	37	2nd
Rosemary	Marilyn Monroe	"Diamonds Are a Girl's Best Friend"	19 (7, 7, 5)	(5); Marcelo	0	19	5th
Marcelo Augusto	Julio Iglesias	"Por Ella"	30 (10, 10, 10)	(5); Li	20	50	1st
Leo Maia	Martinho da Vila	"Mulheres"	12 (4, 4, 4)	(5); Marcelo	0	12	7th

=== Week 10 ===
Aired: October 27, 2014

Celebrity	Performing as	Song	Scores	Extra points		Results	
Celebrity	Performing as	Song	Scores	Vote	Bonus	Night total	Night rank
Vanessa Jackson	Alcione	"Meu Ébano"	22 (7, 8, 7)	(3) Li (2) Christian	2	24	4th
Li Martins	Shakira	"Ojos Así"	29 (10, 10, 9)	(3) Marcelo (2) Rosemary	18	47	1st
Marcelo Augusto	Maria Bethânia	"Fera Ferida"	17 (6, 5, 6)	(3) Li (2) Christian	3	20	5th
Syang	Avril Lavigne	"Sk8er Boi"	24 (9, 7, 8)	(3) Li (2) Christian	2	26	3rd
Rosemary	Rita Lee	"Erva Venenosa"	16 (5, 6, 5)	(3) Li (2) Christian	2	18	6th
Christian Chávez	Pharrell Williams	"Happy"	27 (8, 9, 10)	(3) Li (2) Syang	8	35	2nd
Leo Maia	Bobby McFerrin	"Don't Worry, Be Happy"	12 (4, 4, 4)	(3) Li (2) Vanessa	0	12	7th

=== Week 11 ===
Aired: November 3, 2014

Celebrity	Performing as	Song	Scores	Extra points		Results	
Celebrity	Performing as	Song	Scores	Vote	Bonus	Night total	Night rank
Leo Maia	Luiz Gonzaga	"O Xote das Meninas"	13 (5, 4, 4)	(3) Rosemary (2) Vanessa	5	18	6th
Vanessa Jackson	Tina Turner	"Proud Mary"	22 (8, 7, 7)	(3) Marcelo (2) Leo	2	24	4th
Li Martins	Christina Aguilera	"Lady Marmalade"	23 (6, 8, 9)	(3) Marcelo (2) Syang	5	28	3rd
Christian Chávez	Thalía	"Maria la del Barrio"	14 (4, 5, 5)	(3) Marcelo (2) Rosemary	4	18	6th
Rosemary	Gloria Estefan	"El Día Que Me Quieras"	27 (9, 10, 8)	(3) Leo (2) Christian	5	32	2nd
Syang	Rouge	"Ragatanga"	19 (7, 6, 6)	(3) Marcelo (2) Li	2	21	5th
Marcelo Augusto	Ney Matogrosso	"Homem Com H" ft. "Vira"	29 (10, 9, 10)	(3) Li (2) Christian	12	41	1st

=== Week 12 ===
Aired: November 10, 2014

Celebrity	Performing as	Song	Scores	Extra points		Results	
Celebrity	Performing as	Song	Scores	Vote	Bonus	Night total	Night rank
Li Martins	Gloria Gaynor	"I Will Survive"	22 (8, 8, 6)	(3) Christian (2) Vanessa	2	24	4th
Marcelo Augusto	Lenny Kravitz	"Fly Away"	12 (4, 4, 4)	(3) Christian (2) Syang	5	17	7th
Vanessa Jackson	Nicki Minaj	"Starships" ft. "Anaconda"	27 (9, 10, 8)	(3) Syang (2) Rosemary	2	29	2nd
Rosemary	Rosanah	"O Amor e o Poder"	15 (5, 5, 5)	(3) Christian (2) Leo	5	20	6th
Christian Chávez	Mick Jagger	"Satisfaction"	28 (10, 9, 9)	(3) Marcelo (2) Leo	12	40	1st
Syang	Aqua	"Barbie Girl"	19 (6, 6, 7)	(3) Christian (2) Marcelo	5	24	5th
Leo Maia	Raul Seixas	"Cowboy Fora de Lei"	24 (7, 7, 10)	(3) Rosemary (2) Li	4	28	3rd

=== Week 13 ===
Aired: November 17, 2014

- Guest judge: Roberta Miranda

Celebrity	Performing as	Song	Scores	Extra points		Results	
Celebrity	Performing as	Song	Scores	Vote	Bonus	Night total	Night rank
Leo Maia	Adoniran Barbosa	"Trem das Onze"	22 (5, 6, 6, 5)	— —	—	22	5th
Syang	ABBA	"Mamma Mia" ft. "Dancing Queen"	21 (6, 5, 4, 6)	— —	—	21	6th
Li Martins	Taylor Swift	"I Knew You Were Trouble"	32 (8, 9, 8, 7)	— —	—	32	3rd
Vanessa Jackson	Aretha Franklin	"I Say a Little Prayer" ft. "Rolling In The Deep"	40 (10, 10, 10, 10)	— —	—	40	1st
Rosemary	Clara Nunes	"Ê Baiana"	29 (7, 7, 7, 8)	— —	—	29	4th
Christian Chávez	Alejandro Sanz	"Corazón Partío"	17 (4, 4, 5, 4)	— —	—	17	7th
Marcelo Augusto	Mamonas Assassinas	"Pelados em Santos" ft. "Robocop Gay"	35 (9, 8, 9, 9)	— —	—	35	2nd

=== Week 14 ===
Aired: November 24, 2014

Celebrity	Performing as	Song	Scores	Extra points		Results	
Celebrity	Performing as	Song	Scores	Vote	Bonus	Night total	Night rank
Rosemary	Beth Carvalho	"Coisinha do Pai" ft. "Vou Festejar"	18 (7, 6, 5)	(3) Leo (2) Vanessa	5	23	5th
Li Martins	Paula Fernandes	"Pra Você"	24 (6, 10, 8)	(3) Syang (2) Vanessa	2	26	4th
Marcelo Augusto	Frank Sinatra	"New York, New York"	12 (4, 4, 4)	(3) Syang (2) Vanessa	0	12	7th
Vanessa Jackson	Maysa	"No Me Quitte Pas"	23 (8, 8, 7)	(3) Leo (2) Rosemary	10	33	3rd
Christian Chávez	One Direction	"What Makes You Beautiful"	16 (5, 5, 6)	(3) Syang (2) Vanessa	3	19	6th
Leo Maia	The Temptations	"My Girl"	29 (10, 9, 10)	(3) Rosemary (2) Vanessa	6	35	1st
Syang	Twisted Sister	"We're Not Gonna Take It"	25 (9, 7, 9)	(3) Christian (2) Li	9	34	2nd

=== Week 15 ===
Aired: December 1, 2014

Running order

Celebrity	Performing as	Song	Scores	Extra points		Results	
Celebrity	Performing as	Song	Scores	Vote	Bonus	Night total	Night rank
Marcelo Augusto	Cazuza	"Codinome Beija-Flor" ft. "Pro Dia Nascer Feliz"	25 (7, 10, 8)	(3) Li; Christian	2	27	4th
Vanessa Jackson	Elza Soares	"Malandro" ft. "Eu Bebo Sim" ft. "Mulata Assanhada"	18 (6, 6, 6)	(3) Rosemary (2) Leo	5	23	5th
Li Martins	Mariah Carey	"Vision of Love" ft. "My All" ft. "Without You" ft. "Beautiful"	25 (8, 7, 10)	(3) Christian (2) Syang	8	33	1st
Leo Maia	Chico Science	"Maracatu Atômico"	15 (5, 5, 5)	(3) Rosemary (2) Vanessa	4	19	6th
Syang	Cyndi Lauper	"Girls Just Want to Have Fun"	12 (4, 4, 4)	(3) Christian (2) Li	2	14	7th
Christian Chávez	Marilyn Manson	"Sweet Dreams (Are Made of This)"	25 (9, 9, 7)	(3) Li (2) Marcelo	8	33	1st
Rosemary	Amália Rodrigues	"Canção do Mar"	27 (10, 8, 9)	(3) Vanessa (2) Leo	6	33	1st

=== Week 16 ===
Aired: December 8, 2014

Celebrity	Performing as	Song	Scores	Extra points		Results	
Celebrity	Performing as	Song	Scores	Vote	Bonus	Night total	Night rank
Li Martins	Demi Lovato	"Let It Go"	22 (7, 7, 8)	(3) Marcelo (2) Christian	2	24	3rd
Vanessa Jackson	Ludmilla	"Sem Querer"	21 (6, 8, 7)	(3) Marcelo (2) Syang	2	23	5th
Marcelo Augusto	Emílio Santiago	"Saigon" ft. "Isso Aqui o Que É"	28 (8, 10, 10)	(3) Christian (2) Syang	11	39	1st
Christian Chávez	The Black Eyed Peas	"Boom Boom Pow"	28 (10, 9, 9)	(3) Marcelo (2) Vanessa	8	36	2nd
Rosemary	Celly Campello	"Banho de Lua"	12 (4, 4, 4)	(3) Leo (2) Li	3	15	7th
Syang	AC/DC	"You Shook Me All Night Long"	15 (5, 5, 5)	(3) Christian (2) Marcelo	6	21	6th
Leo Maia	Os Paralamas do Sucesso	"Alagados"	21 (9, 6, 6)	(3) Rosemary (2) Syang	3	24	3rd

=== Week 17 ===
Aired: December 15, 2014

Eliminated

Celebrity	Performing as	Song	Scores	Extra points		Results	
Celebrity	Performing as	Song	Scores	Vote	Bonus	Night total	Night rank
Marcelo Augusto	Reginaldo Rossi	"Garçom"	17 (8, 4, 5)	(3) Li (2) Christian	5	22	6th
Christian Chávez	Boy George	"Karma Chameleon"	18 (9, 5, 4)	(3) Marcelo (2) Li	2	20	7th
Li Martins	Shania Twain	"Man! I Feel Like a Woman!"	16 (4, 6, 6)	(3) Syang (2) Marcelo	8	24	5th
Vanessa Jackson	Lara Fabian	"Love by Grace"	30 (10, 10, 10)	(3) Syang (2) Leo	6	36	1st
Syang	Jessica Rabbit	"Why Don’t You do Right"	24 (7, 9, 8)	(3) Li (2) Vanessa	6	30	2nd
Leo Maia	The Commodores	"Easy"	19 (5, 7, 7)	(3) Rosemary (2) Vanessa	5	24	4th
Rosemary	Fafá de Belém	"Ave Maria"	23 (6, 8, 9)	(3) Leo (2) Vanessa	3	26	3rd

=== Week 18 ===
Aired: December 22, 2014

Celebrity	Performing as	Song	Scores	Extra points		Results	
Celebrity	Performing as	Song	Scores	Vote	Bonus	Night total	Night rank
Vanessa Jackson	Jennifer Hudson	"And I Am Telling You I'm Not Going"	No judge's scores or extra points			Winner of Esse Artista Sou Eu	
Marcelo Augusto	Nelson Ned	"Tudo Passará"	No judge's scores or extra points			Fourth place of Esse Artista Sou Eu	
Li Martins	Susan Boyle	"Memory"	No judge's scores or extra points			Runner-up of Esse Artista Sou Eu	
Christian Chávez	Cee Lo Green	"Forget You"	No judge's scores or extra points			Third place of Esse Artista Sou Eu	

== Ratings ==
=== Brazilian ratings ===
All ratings are in points and are provided by IBOPE.

Episode	Title	Air Date	Timeslot (BRT)	SP viewers (in points)	Rank timeslot	Source
1	Week 1	August 25, 2014	Monday 11:30 p.m.	7.0	2	
2	Week 2	September 1, 2014	Monday 11:30 p.m.	6.5	3	
3	Week 3	September 8, 2014	Monday 11:30 p.m.	5.9	3	
4	Week 4	September 15, 2014	Monday 11:30 p.m.	5.0	3	
5	Week 5	September 22, 2014	Monday 11:30 p.m.	5.2	3	
6	Week 6	September 29, 2014	Monday 11:30 p.m.	6.3	2	
7	Week 7	October 6, 2014	Monday 11:30 p.m.	6.4	2	
8	Week 8	October 13, 2014	Monday 11:30 p.m.	4.9	3	
9	Week 9	October 20, 2014	Monday 11:30 p.m.	7.1	2	
10	Week 10	October 27, 2014	Monday 11:30 p.m.	6.3	3	
11	Week 11	November 3, 2014	Monday 11:30 p.m.	6.6	3	
12	Week 12	November 10, 2014	Monday 11:30 p.m.	6.8	2	
13	Week 13	November 17, 2014	Monday 11:30 p.m.	6.0	3	
14	Week 14	November 24, 2014	Monday 11:30 p.m.	5.7	3	
15	Week 15	December 1, 2014	Monday 11:30 p.m.	6.6	3	
16	Week 16	December 8, 2014	Monday 11:30 p.m.	4.5	3	
17	Week 17	December 15, 2014	Monday 11:30 p.m.	5.8	3	
18	Winner Announced	December 22, 2014	Monday 11:30 p.m.	6.4	3	

- In 2014, each point represents 65.000 households in São Paulo.
