= Sandra Bréa =

Brazilian model and actress (1952-2000)

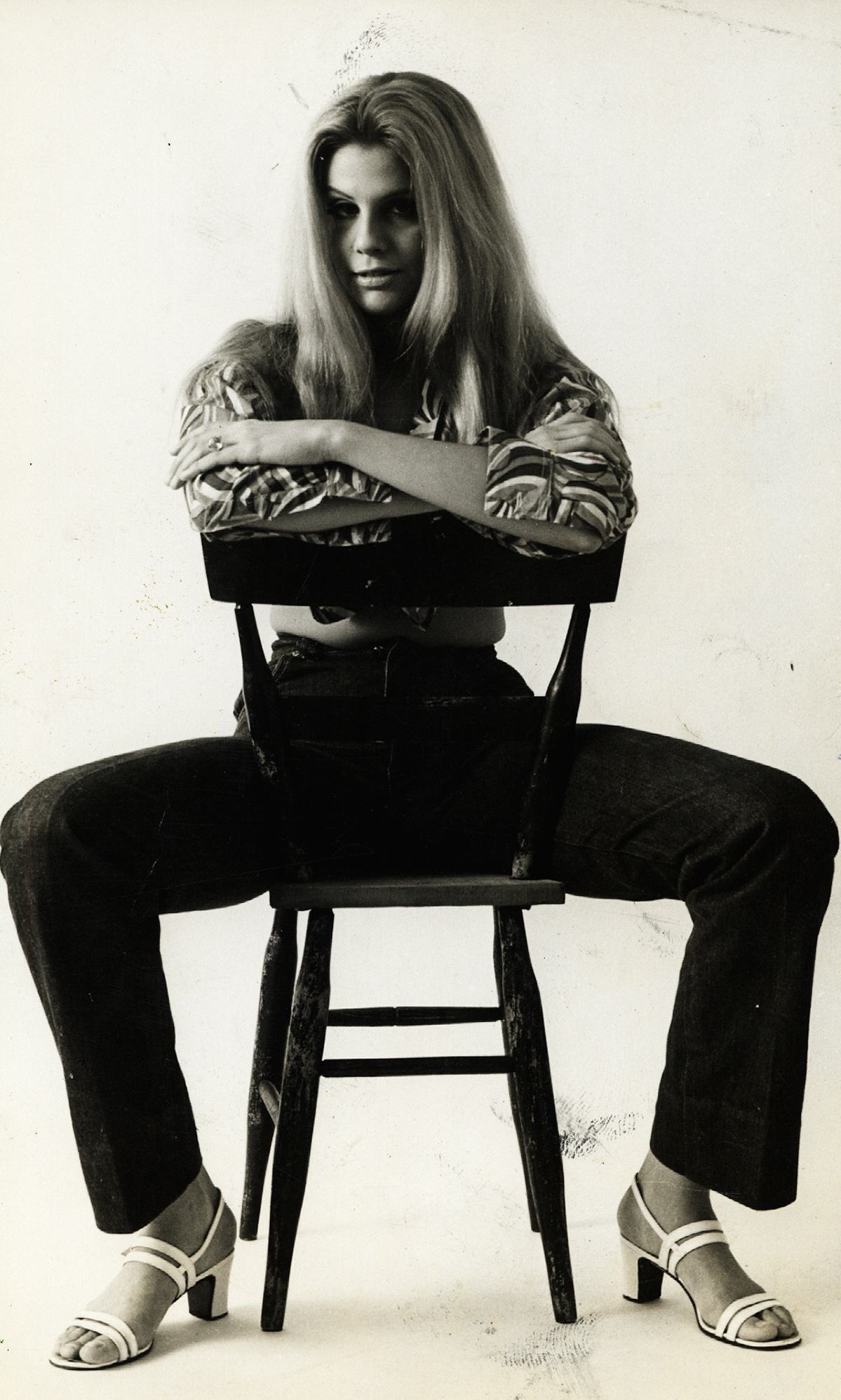
- Bréa in 1972
- Born: Sandra Bréa Brito; 11 May 1952; Rio de Janeiro, Brazil
- Died: 4 May 2000 (aged 47); Rio de Janeiro, Brazil
- Occupations: Model; actress
- Years active: 1966–1998

Sandra Bréa Brito (11 May 1952 – 4 May 2000) was a Brazilian actress and model. An exponent of the Porn Art Movement, she was one of Brazil's main sex symbols, especially in the 1970s, having posed nude several times for magazines such as Playboy and Status among the others. Sandra was a key figure in the sexploitation film genre known as Pornochanchada in Brazil in the 1970s. She was also known for publicly admitting that she was infected with the HIV virus in August 1993. She died of lung cancer in 2000.

== Career ==
Sandra began her career at the age of thirteen, as a model. At fourteen, she went to Rio's revue theater, where she starred in Poeira de Ipanema. As an actress she debuted in 1968 in the play Plaza Suite, having been chosen for the role by director João Bittencourt and actress Fernanda Montenegro.

Hired by Moacyr Deriquém, she went to work at TV Globo, debuting in the soap opera Assim na Terra Como no Céu, in 1970. In 1972, director Daniel Filho invited her to play Telma, a character in the soap opera O Bem Amado, which was her first big role.

Sandra has acted in several erotic films and pornochanchadas. Her first nudes were taken in the 1970s, during the military regime, when this was much less common. She eventually became a main sex symbol of Brazil and had posed nude for magazines such as Status and Playboy, during the military dictatorship, which repressed this type of content in Brazil. She also became the cover of Playboy Brazil's 1981 June edition.

== Personal life ==
In August 1993, Sandra revealed that she contracted the HIV virus. I have AIDS and good health, thank God; she said. After this incident, she was no longer invited to star in a soap opera. In December 1999, she was diagnosed with lung cancer. Sandra died on 4 May 2000, at her home, in Rio de Janeiro, after a respiratory arrest.
