= Pau Que Nasce Torto / Melô do Tchan =

Single by É o Tchan!

from the album É o Tchan!
- Released: 1995
- Genre: Pagode
- Length: 3:57
- Label: Polygram

É o Tchan! singles chronology
"Pau Que Nasce Torto / Melô do Tchan" (1995)	"Paquerei" (1995)

Music video
- "Pau Que Nasce Torto / Melô do Tchan" on YouTube

"Pau Que Nasce Torto / Melô do Tchan" is a song by the Brazilian Pagode group É o Tchan!, released in 1995. Originally two different songs that were respectively written by Cau Lima and the duo Cissinho e Bieco, the song was part of the first album of the group, É o Tchan!, and became their biggest international success. It was featured in the film Cinderela Baiana. The song was also issued as a remix titled "É O Tchan" that was released as a single in Europe and Latin America.

In Spain, the song became one of the songs of the summer in 1996, appearing on the compilation Caribe Mix. In Europe, the group played on various national programs to promote the song.

== Charts ==
Weekly chart performance for "Pau Que Nasce Torto / Melô do Tchan"
Chart (1997)	Peak position
Spain (AFYVE)	6
US Hot Latin Songs (Billboard)	28

== See also ==
- List of best-selling singles in Brazil
