= Luma de Oliveira =

Brazilian actress and former model

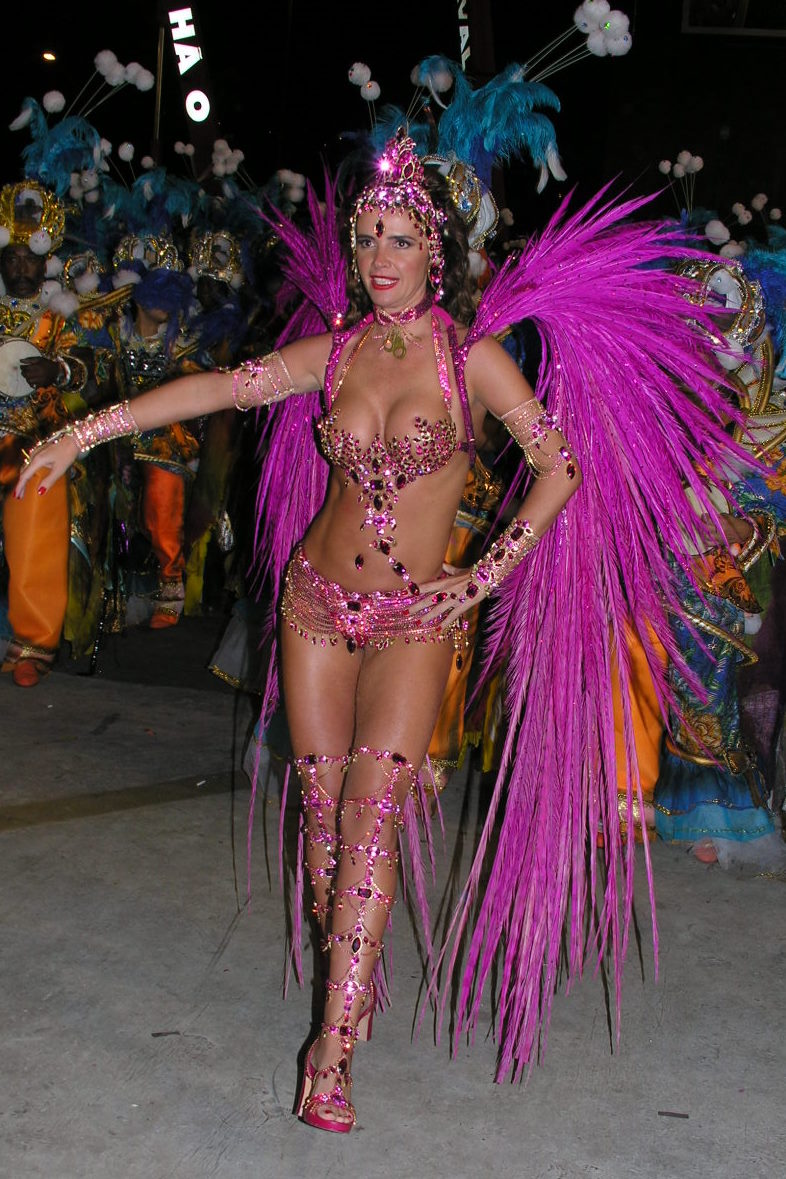
- Luma at the Carnival of Rio de Janeiro 2005
- Born: December 10, 1964 (age 61); Nova Friburgo, Rio de Janeiro, Brazil
- Spouse: Eike Batista (m. 1991; div. 2004)
- Children: 2
- Modeling information
- Height: 5 ft 8.5 in (1.74 m)
- Hair color: Brown
- Eye color: Brown

Luma de Oliveira (Brazilian Portuguese pronunciation: [ˈlumɐ dʒi oliˈvejɾɐ]; born December 10, 1964) is a former model, actress, and Brazilian carnival queen. She was Madrinha da Bateria (Godmother of the Percussion, or "Queen of the Drums") for several samba schools until 2005, later returning to the role for the renowned Portela school in 2009.

== Early life ==
Luma was born in Nova Friburgo. Oliveira's mother, Maria Luiza de Castro and her father, Luiz Naegele de Oliveira, was of Portuguese descent and worked for Leopoldina Railroad company. One of Oliveira's ancestors was German Georg Heinrich von Langsdorff, Baron de Langsdorff. She is the youngest of six children; her oldest sister is popular actress Ísis de Oliveira, and her brother, Mem de Oliveira, wrote poetry.

Her name was created using the first two letters of her parents' names: LUiz and MAria. She attended the Institute Gay-Lussac and played handball and volleyball, but her passion was cycling and running on the beach.

== Career ==
=== Modeling ===
Oliveira began modeling at age 16, after the death of her father in 1980. She moved to Niterói and her brother Mem became her guardian, agent and manager. She worked in Japan, France and Germany, but her biggest success was in Brazil.

Luma de Oliveira promoted the Clarity line of cosmetics, marketed through FLX Consultancy and Franchising. She also appeared in commercials for Havaianas flip-flops and Danone yogurt, and on the cover of numerous Brazilian magazines: Fitness, Guys, Headline, Look, and Who's That Guy.

She caught the attention of Brazilian Playboy in 1984 as the younger sister of television actress Isis de Oliveira, who was herself featured on the magazine's cover in 1983 and 1991. Luma was the covergirl in 1987, 1988, 1990, 2001 and 2005; she was named Miss Playboy International in 1999. Her five cover appearances, the last one at the age of 40, are tied with Scheila Carvalho as the most of any person in the magazine's history, and those issues generated record magazine sales.

Oliveira's appearance at the cover of VIP, a popular Brazilian men's magazine by the same publisher as Playboy, Editora Abril, in January 2000, resulted in the magazine's best selling issue ever. In their annual reader poll of the world's 100 sexiest women, Oliveira appeared 6 times, between 1998 through 2003, and 2006, with her highest placement being eighth in 2001.

=== Television ===
She appeared on three television shows:

- 1986 Hipertensão (Marcos's girlfriend)
- 1987 O Outro (Dedé)
- 1990 Meu Bem, Meu Mal (Ana Maria)

During the late 1980s, she turned down roles in four successful Brazilian telenovelas, including Top Model, Olho por Olho, Kananga do Japão and Pantanal. In 2007, she declined an invitation to star in a Brazilian version of Desperate Housewives because it would be filmed in Argentina, and require too much time away from her children.

=== Movies ===
Her acting career included five films:

- 1988 Os Heróis Trapalhões - Uma Aventura na Selva (Maya)
- 1989 Solidão, Uma Linda História de Amor
- 1990 Boca de Ouro (Celeste)
- 1994 Boca (Celeste)
- 1997 O Noviço Rebelde (Tereza)

She refused to star a remake of Lady on the Bus, starred by Sônia Braga in 1978, based on a popular novel by Nelson Rodrigues. Oliveira claimed the "R" rated film would embarrass her adolescent children.

== Personal life ==
=== Marriage ===
Oliveira met Brazilian businessman Eike Batista in 1990, and he invited her to accompany him to an offshore powerboat racing event in which he was competing. They continued to see each other and she was pregnant when they eloped on January 31, 1991. However, he was engaged to marry Brazilian socialite Patricia Leal in a civil ceremony one week later, and had already completed the religious ceremony. Oliveira was unaware of the situation and stated, "I just knew he had a girlfriend, but not suspected who it was." Leal eventually married wealthy heir Antenor Mayrink Veiga, a prior boyfriend of Oliveira.

She stopped modelling but continued parading during Carnival and created a controversy in 1998 when she wore a collar with the name of her husband. Feminists claimed she was supporting the attitude that women should be submissive. Oliveira countered that submissive women do not parade in competitive samba. During Carnaval the following year, she wore a pair of handcuffs draped around her neck to make fun of the controversy the previous year.

The marriage produced two sons. Thor Batista de Oliveira was born August 1, 1991, and Olin Batista de Oliveira was born in December, 1995. Oliveira recovered her figure after her pregnancies and wanted to resume her career in 1999 by again posing for Playboy. Her brother revealed that Batista convinced his wife to change her mind and he compensated Playboy for Oliveira's breach of contract. Two years later, Oliveira posed for and appeared on Playboy's cover in May, 2001. Batista still opposed his wife's decision and the tabloids covered the story, but Oliveira began working again. She was photographed for Angels of Brazil, a calendar sponsored by Rio de Janeiro's Fire Department, and several men's magazines.

Oliveira was with her husband on stage at the dedication of Termoceará, a power plant in Fortaleza on May 1, 2002. During the ceremony, she was noticed 'displaying her assets' while adjusting her nylons. Batista was annoyed, but many in the audience were delighted. The facility was subsequently nicknamed TermoLuma.

In January 2004, Oliveira stated that she was pregnant and would not dance during Carnival. A few weeks later, her lawyer announced that the couple was separating, and the divorce was final on March 22, 2004. Oliveira received no spousal support, but an undisclosed property settlement, rumored to be $250 million. When asked, she commented that her husband had always been generous.

Batista agreed to pay $20,000 per month in child support and he purchased a home for his children next door to his own which Oliveira could occupy for two years. Batista often dropped by for morning coffee and quality time with their sons. Oliveira insisted that she and her former spouse have remained good friends.

=== Unattached ===
Two months after her divorce became final, Oliveira's mother Maria suffered a heart attack and died.

Oliveira sued The Independent after the newspaper published a photograph of her to illustrate an article that exposed German politicians and Volkswagen employees consorting with prostitutes at Carnaval. The paper published a retraction two days later on page 28, which stated:

"In an article published Thursday on the VW case was illustrated with a picture of a samba dancer. The picture, in fact, is the Brazilian actress and model Luma de Oliveira. We had not intended to suggest that Ms. Oliveira is linked in any way with the case and VW are sorry for any misunderstanding."
