= Luize Altenhofen =

Brazilian model and television presenter (born 1979)

- Born: Luizeani Altenhofen; July 6, 1979 (age 47); Cruz Alta, Rio Grande do Sul, Brazil
- Occupations: model; actress; television presenter
- Years active: 1995–present
- Spouse: Frederico Galiotto
- Children: 1
- Modeling information
- Height: 1.72 m (5 ft 7 1/2 in)
- Hair color: Blonde
- Eye color: Green

Luizeani Altenhofen (born July 6, 1979) is a Brazilian actress, model and television presenter.

== Biography ==
Altenhofen was born Luizeani Altenhofen on July 6, 1979, in Cruz Alta, Rio Grande do Sul. Of German descent, her parents, Maria Denise Justo Panda and Luiz Ademir Altenhofen, were both physical education instructors. She was emancipated to work when she was 16 years old, and around then began taking part in her first beauty pageants. In 1996 she was elected Miss Rio Grande do Sul and in 1998 was third place as Miss Brasil Internacional, but due to health problems couldn't compete at the Miss International 1998 contest in Japan.

Beginning in the late 1990s/early 2000s Altenhofen began to dedicate herself to television; one of her earliest credits, with 19 years old, was a guest appearance on the music video of the song "Zóio de Lula", by famous alternative rock band Charlie Brown Jr. She also appeared in ads by Skol, and working for Rede Bandeirantes has hosted the shows Supertécnico and Band Esporte Clube after leaving SporTV, where she hosted Rolé. In 2001 and again in 2006 she posed for Playboy Brasil, and also was an assistant and reporter for Domingão do Faustão.

In 2013 she made a guest appearance on Rede Globo's telenovela Amor à Vida.

In 2016 she hosted and was a reporter for the Rio de Janeiro Summer Olympics, invited by SBT.

== Personal life ==
Altenhofen is married to businessman Frederico Galiotto, with whom she had a daughter, Greta (born 2009).
