= Heloísa Pinheiro =

Brazilian model

Helô Pinheiro
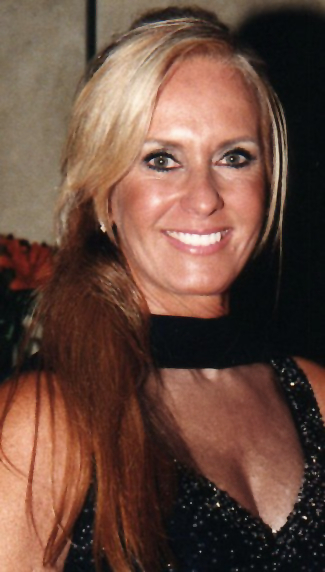
- Pinheiro in July 2006
- Born: Heloísa Eneida Menezes Paes Pinto; July 7, 1943 (age 82); Rio de Janeiro, Brazil
- Occupation: Businessperson
- Years active: 1962–2003 (model)
- Website: garotadeipanema.com.br

Heloísa Eneida Paes Pinto Mendes Pinheiro (born July 7, 1943), better known as Helô Pinheiro (Portuguese pronunciation: [eˈlo piˈɲejɾu]), is a Brazilian businesswoman and former model.

== Biography ==
At the age of 17, Pinheiro became the source of inspiration for the song "The Girl from Ipanema" when songwriters Antônio Carlos Jobim and Vinicius de Moraes saw her walking to the beach in Ipanema, her native neighborhood in Rio de Janeiro.

Pinheiro became a Brazilian Playboy Playmate in 1987 and once again in 2003, when she did a pictorial along with her daughter Ticiane Pinheiro.

She also appeared in the second season of The Amazing Race, for the Beach portion of the first Detour clue, and on America's Next Top Model, Cycle 12, for a modelling challenge in Brazil.

== Girl from Ipanema legal case ==
In 2001, the song's copyright owners (the heirs of the composers) sued Pinheiro for using the title of the song "Garota de Ipanema" as the name of her boutique. In their complaint, they stated that her status as the inspiration for the song did not entitle her to use the title of the song commercially.

Public support was strongly in favor of Pinheiro. A press release by the composers, Jobim and de Moraes, that named Pinheiro as the original "girl from Ipanema" ("garota de Ipanema") was cited as evidence that they had intended to bestow this title on her. The court ruled in favor of Pinheiro.
