= Carla Perez (dancer) =

Brazilian singer, dancer, TV presenter and actress

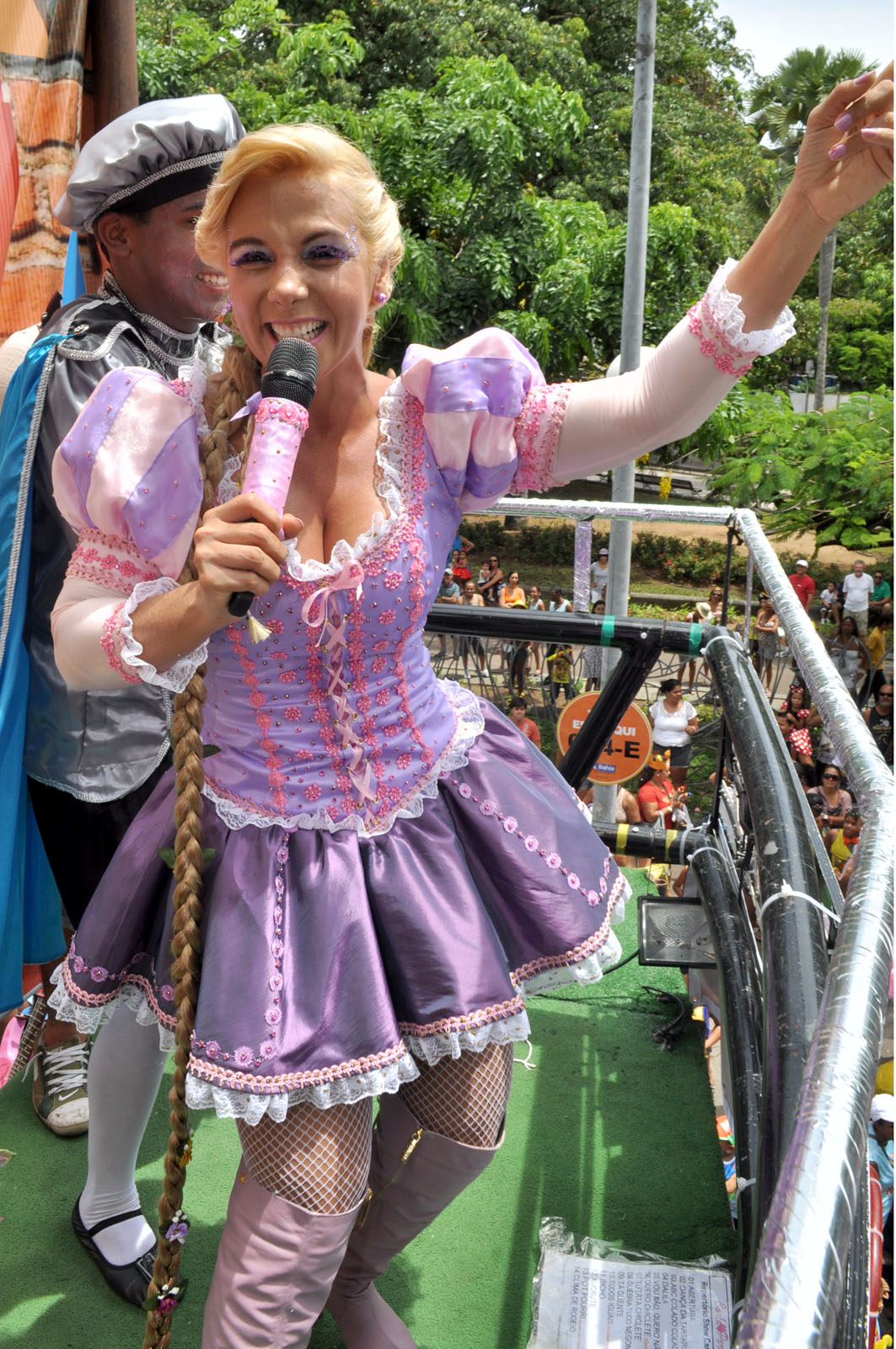
- Perez in 2012
- Born: Carla Aparecida Perez Soares; November 16, 1977 (age 48); Salvador, Bahia, Brazil
- Occupations: Singer, dancer, television presenter, ex-actress
- Years active: 1995–present
- Spouse: Xanddy (m. 2001)
- Children: 2
- Musical career
- Genres: Samba, pagode, axé, pop, children's music
- Instrument: Vocals
- Labels: Cinema Music, Muralha Records
- Formerly of: É o Tchan!
- Website: carlaperez.com.br

Carla Aparecida Perez Soares da Silva (née Soares; born November 16, 1977) is a Brazilian singer, dancer and television presenter. She reached fame in the mid-1990s after performing as the blonde dancer with axé group É o Tchan! (loira do Tchan).

== Biography ==
Carla Perez was born in Salvador, Bahia on November 16, 1977, to Carlos Soares and Ivone Perez; on her mother's side, she is of Spanish descent. She also has two brothers and two sisters. When she was 15 years old, she gave up on her baile de debutante to afford a model course. In 1995 she was invited to perform for newly founded axé group É o Tchan!, what launched her into nationwide fame and later on led her to pose naked five times for Playboy Brasil. Perez parted ways with É o Tchan! in 1998 to pursue personal projects, such as the one of being an actress; in the same year she starred alongside Alexandre Pires (her boyfriend at the time), Perry Salles, Lázaro Ramos and Lucci Ferreira in the semi-fictionalized biographical film Cinderela Baiana, directed by Conrado Sanchez. It was a critical and commercial failure, and Perez announced many years after the film's release that she had disowned it. Her final acting role was a cameo in the 1999 film Xuxa Requebra. Around the same time she hosted the variety shows Fantasia (from 1998 to 1999) and Canta e Dança, Minha Gente (from 1999 to 2001), both broadcast by SBT.

Beginning in 2000, when she released her first album, Algodão-Doce, through Cinema Music, and founded the Carnival block of the same name, Perez began to dedicate herself for children. She released two further albums, Todos Iguais and Eletro Kids, in 2005 and 2007 respectively. From 2003 to 2008 she covered the Bahian Carnaval for Rede Bandeirantes. More recently, from 2012 to 2017, she hosted the children's show Clube da Alegria, broadcast by TV Aratu in Bahia.

== Personal life ==
Perez had a short-lived relationship with Só Pra Contrariar frontman Alexandre Pires in the late 1990s. In 2000 she met Harmonia do Samba vocalist Manuel Alexandre Oliveira da Silva (better known as Xanddy), and they married the following year. The couple has two children: Camilly Victória (born 2001) and Victor Alexandre (born 2003). From early 2016 until late 2017 they lived in Orlando, Florida.

Perez is an Evangelical Christian.

== Filmography ==
=== Television ===
Year	Title	Role(s)
1998–1999	Fantasia	Herself (host)
1999–2001	Canta e Dança, Minha Gente	Herself (host)
2003–2008	Band Folia	Herself (host)
2012–2017	Clube da Alegria	Herself (host)

=== Film ===
Year	Title	Role	Notes
1998	Cinderela Baiana	Carla Perez	
1999	Xuxa Requebra	Motogirl	Cameo

== Discography ==
Year	Album
2000	Algodão-Doce: Label: Cinema Music; Format: CD
2005	Todos Juntos: Label: Muralha Records; Format: CD
2007	Eletro Kids: Label: Cinema Music; Format: CD
