= Syang =

Brazilian musician, writer, and model

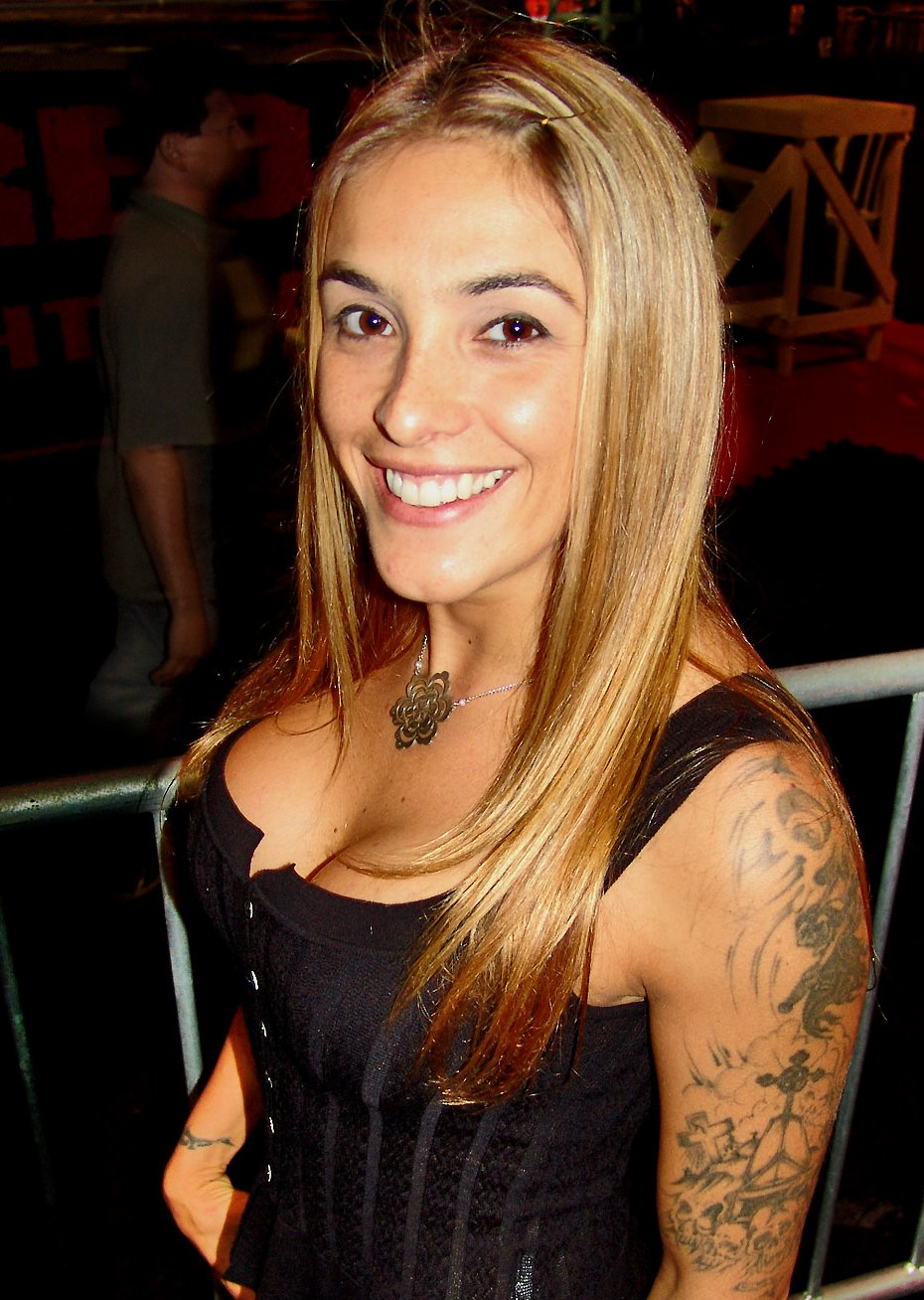
- Syang in 2006

Background information
- Born: Simone Dreyer Peres; 7 November 1968 (age 57); Brasília, Brazil
- Occupations: Musician, writer, model
- Instrument: Guitar
- Years active: Mid-1980s-present
- Formerly of: Detrito Federal; PUS; DeFalla
- Spouse(s): Ronan Meireles (div. 1997); Daniel Sabbá (div. c. 2002)
- Partner: Eduardo Santoro

Simone Dreyer Peres (born 7 November 1968), better known as Syang (Portuguese: [siˈjɐ̃ɡi]) is a Brazilian musician, erotic writer, and model. Her stage name is a tribute to the AC/DC guitarist Angus Young.

== Early life ==
Syang was born in Brasília, Brazil, and began learning the piano aged 8 years old. Three years later, she won her first guitar and decided to be a guitarist.

== Career ==
At 13, she formed the band Autópsia. She later joined punk band Detrito Federal, then PUS (releasing four albums with them) and DeFalla during their glam rock phase around 2003. She had some success in her solo career with the single "Olha Pra Mim" ("Look At Me"). The video was played on MTV Brasil. In 2005, she recorded Dinho Ouro Preto with the band Capital Inicial, which came with a booklet of her erotic stories illustrated by comic artists.

In August 2009, she announced plans for an acoustic tour with the guitarist Veloso, saying, "We'll just play rock'n'roll, ranging from the Ramones to the Sex Pistols."

She appeared on the reality TV show Casa dos Artistas (House of Artists) in 2002. In 2003, she recorded a pilot for a show, A Bela da Tarde (Belle de Jour), and she did work for MTV Overdrive.

She joined Transamerica Radio in 2007, as part of the daily show Transalouca.

In 2002, she released a book of 17 erotic stories, No Cio (Rutting). She appeared on the cover of Brazilian Playboy in November 2002. In May 2004, she appeared on the cover of Sexy, which included an article written by her: "Nua (e com tesão) em Brasília" (Naked (and horny) in Brasilia). She admires the erotic writer Nelson Rodrigues.

In 2009, she released the book Sexualidade na Gravidez - Relatos de uma mãe de primeira viagem (Sexuality in Pregnancy - Reports of a new mother).

== Personal life ==
She was married to Ronan, her PUS bandmate, for 12 years until 1997, after which she moved to Brasília to live with her grandfather, Alberto Perez. Her appearance on Casa Dos Artistas in 2002 led to the end of her marriage to Daniel Sabbá due to a relationship that occurred during the show. She had a daughter in 2008 with the fighter Eduardo Santoro. She had a breast reduction when she was 18, and an enlargement 10 years later. She practices jiu-jitsu.

== Discography ==
- Vítimas do Milagre (Victims of the Miracle) — Detrito Federal — Polygram, 1987. Credited as Simone, guitarist.
- PUS — PUS — Cogumelo, 1990. She shared guitar and vocals in English with her then husband, Ronan, in a heavy metal album.
- Sin Is the Only Salvation — PUS — Eldorado, 1994. Rock and heavy percussion. She wrote eight tracks.
- Presets — PUS — Paradoxx Music, 1997. Electronic music.
- Syang — Solo — Warner/Chappell, 1998. The album was sung in Portuguese with intimate ballads.
- Dinho Ouro Preto — with Capital Inicial — 2005.
