= Fat Family =

Brazilian musical group

- Origin: Sorocaba, SP, Brazil
- Genres: Soul, pop, new jack swing, funk, R&B, gospel
- Years active: 1998–present
- Labels: EMI Music
- Members: Simone; Suzete; Katia; Celinho
- Past members: Sidney Cipriano (deceased); Celinha Cipriano; Suely Cipriano; Deise Cipriano (deceased)

Fat Family is a Brazilian vocal band from Sorocaba. As the name suggests, all members are overweight people and are members of the same family. They have so far released three albums by EMI Music.

Sidney Cipriano (aka Sidney Sinay) died on February 1, 2011, in São Paulo, from a heart attack at the age of 46. Deise Cipriano died of liver cancer on 12 February 2019, at the age of 39.

== Discography ==
- Fat Family - 1998
- Fat Festa - 1999
- Pra Onde For, Me Leve - 2001
- Fat Family - 2003

== Tours ==
- The Fat Family Tour (1998–1999)
- Turnê Fat Festa (1999–2001)
- Por Onde For a Turnê (2001–2003)
- The Fat Family Tour: II You (2003–2005)*
