= Daniel (Brazilian singer) =

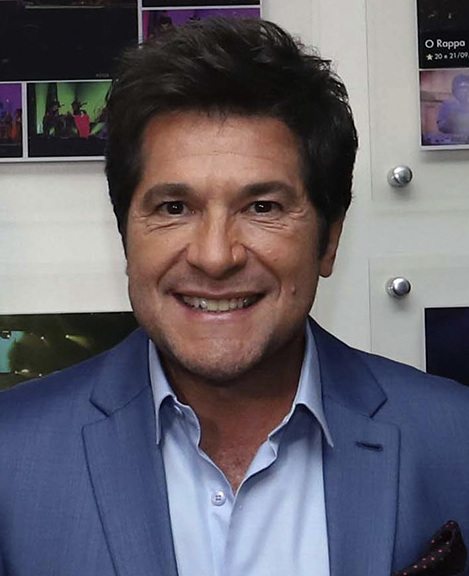
- Daniel in 2018

Background information
- Born: September 9, 1968 (age 58)
- Origin: Brotas, São Paulo, Brazil
- Genres: Sertanejo music; Sertanejo; MPB; Caipira music; Contemporary Catholic liturgical music
- Instruments: Vocals, guitar
- Years active: 1980–present
- Labels: Warner Music (1985 - 2009); Som Livre (2010 - 2011); Sony Music (2011 - 2014); Universal Music (2015 - 2018); Independent (2018 - present)
- Formerly of: João Paulo & Daniel
- Website: www.daniel.art.br

José Daniel Camillo (born September 9, 1968, in Brotas, São Paulo), better known as Daniel, is a Brazilian sertanejo and romantic singer and songwriter, and occasional actor.

Originally part of sertanejo duo João Paulo & Daniel, he has maintained a solo career since the untimely death of João Paulo in 1997. On June 5, 2012, he was confirmed as one of the coaches for the first season of upcoming reality television show The Voice Brasil.

His album As Músicas do Filme "O Menino da Porteira" won the 2010 Latin Grammy Award for Best Native Brazilian Roots Album.

His album Daniel won the 2017 Latin Grammy Award for Best Sertaneja Music Album. In 2021, his album Daniel em Casa was also nominated in the same category.

== Discography ==
Daniel discography
- Studio albums: 24
- Extended plays: 2
- Live albums: 9
- Compilation albums: 22

Throughout his entire career, Daniel has sold over 13 million records in total.

=== As João Paulo & Daniel ===
The duo João Paulo & Daniel sold more than 5 million records.

==== Studio albums ====
Title	Album details	Certifications	Sales
Amor Sempre Amor	Released: 1985; Label: Chantecler; Format: LP, cassette, CD		BRA: 25,000
Planeta Coração	Released: 1987; Label: Chantecler; Format: LP, cassette, CD		BRA: 50,000
João Paulo & Daniel Vol. 3	Released: 1989; 1991 (relaunched); Label: Chantecler; Format: LP, cassette, CD		BRA: 90,000
João Paulo & Daniel Vol. 4	Released: 1992; Label: Chantecler; Format: LP, cassette, CD		BRA: 90,000
João Paulo & Daniel Vol. 5	Released: 1993; Label: Chantecler; Format: LP, cassette, CD	ABPD: Platinum	BRA: 400,000
João Paulo & Daniel Vol. 6	Released: 9 March 1995; Label: Chantecler; Format: LP, cassette, CD	ABPD: 2× Platinum	BRA: 500,000
João Paulo & Daniel Vol. 7	Released: 26 August 1996; Label: Chantecler; Format: LP, cassette, CD	ABPD: Diamond	BRA: 1,000,000
João Paulo & Daniel Vol. 8	Released: April 1997; Label: Chantecler; Format: Cassette, CD	ABPD: Diamond	BRA: 1,000,000

==== Live album ====
Title	Album details	Certifications	Sales
Ao Vivo	Released: November 1997; Label: Chantecler; Format: Cassette, CD, VHS, DVD	ABPD: Diamond (CD)	BRA: 1,000,000

==== Compilation albums ====
Title	Album details	Certifications	Sales
Os 14 Maiores Sucessos	Released: 1996; Label: Chantecler; Format: LP, cassette, CD	ABPD: 2× Platinum	BRA: 500,000
Sucessos de Ouro	Released: 1997; Label: Chantecler; Format: CD	ABPD: Gold	BRA: 100,000
Homenagem a João Paulo	Released: 1998; Label: Chantecler; Format: Cassette, CD		
Bailão do João Paulo & Daniel	Released: 2001; Label: Chantecler; Format: CD		
Warner 25 Anos	Released: 2001; Label: Warner Music; Format: CD		
4x4 - Uma Trilha Movida a Sucessos	Released: 2001; Label: Som Livre; Format: CD		
Os Gigantes	Released: 2002; Label: Warner Music; Format: CD		
E-collection	Released: 2003; Label: Warner Music; Format: CD		
Warner 30 Anos	Released: 2006; Label: Warner Music; Format: CD		

=== As a solo artist ===
In his solo career, Daniel has sold more than 8,5 million records.

==== Studio albums ====
Title	Album details	Certifications	Sales
Daniel	Released: 3 August 1998; Label: Warner Music; Format: CD, digital download	ABPD: Diamond	BRA: 1,300,000
Vou Levando a Vida	Released: 3 August 1999; Label: Warner Music; Format: CD, digital download	ABPD: Diamond	BRA: 1,000,000
Meu Reino Encantado	Released: 5 July 2000; Label: Warner Music; Format: CD, digital download	ABPD: 2× Platinum	BRA: 500,000
Quando o Coração Se Apaixona	Released: 16 November 2000; Label: Warner Music; Format: CD, digital download	ABPD: 3× Platinum	BRA: 750,000
Daniel en Español	Released: May 2001; Label: Warner Music; Format: CD, digital download		BRA: 100,000
Um Homem Apaixonado	Released: 2002; Label: Warner Music; Format: CD, digital download	ABPD: 2× Platinum	BRA: 600,000
Meu Reino Encantado II	Released: 10 October 2003; Label: Warner Music; Format: CD, digital download	ABPD: Gold	BRA: 100,000
Em Qualquer Lugar do Mundo	Released: 4 July 2004; Label: Warner Music; Format: CD, digital download	ABPD: Platinum	BRA: 125,000
Meu Reino Encantado III	Released: 25 July 2005; Label: Warner Music; Format: CD, digital download	ABPD: Gold	BRA: 100,000
Amor Absoluto	Released: 14 July 2006; Label: Warner Music; Format: CD, digital download		
Difícil Não Falar de Amor	Released: 27 May 2008; Label: Warner Music; Format: CD, digital download	ABPD: Platinum	BRA: 100,000
As Músicas do Filme "O Menino da Porteira"	Released: 24 February 2009; Label: Warner Music; Format: CD, digital download		
Pra Ser Feliz	Released: 5 September 2011; Label: Sony Music; Format: CD, digital download		
Daniel	Released: 16 September 2016; Label: Universal Music; Format: CD, DVD, digital download	ABPD: Gold	BRA: 80,000,000 (stream)
Meu Reino Encantado - De Pai pra Filho	Released: 2 September 2022; Label: Daniel Promoções Artísticas Ltda.; Format: LP, DVD, digital download		
Duas Vozes	Released: 9 September 2022; Label: Daniel Promoções Artísticas Ltda.; Format: Digital download		

==== Live albums ====
Title	Album details	Certifications	Sales
Ao Vivo	Released: 1 October 2001; Label: Warner Music; Format: CD, DVD, digital download	ABPD: Diamond (CD); ABPD: Diamond (DVD)	BRA: 1,000,000 (CD); BRA: 100,000 (DVD)
20 Anos de Carreira - Ao Vivo	Released: 2003; Label: Warner Music; Format: CD, DVD, digital download	ABPD: Platinum (CD); ABPD: Diamond (DVD)	BRA: 250,000 (CD); BRA: 100,000 (DVD)
Te Amo Cada Vez Mais - Ao Vivo	Released: 18 November 2005; Label: Warner Music; Format: CD, DVD, digital download	ABPD: Gold (CD); ABPD: Platinum (DVD)	BRA: 100,000 (CD); BRA: 50,000 (DVD)
Raízes	Released: 10 April 2010; Label: Som Livre; Format: CD, DVD, Blu-ray, digital download	ABPD: Gold (DVD)	BRA: 25,000
30 Anos - O Musical	Released: 16 October 2013; Label: Sony Music; Format: DVD, digital download	ABPD: Gold	BRA: 35,000
In Concert em Brotas	Released: 23 October 2015; Label: Universal Music; Format: CD, DVD, digital download	ABPD: Gold (DVD); ABPD: Gold	BRA: 25,000; BRA: 80,000,000 (stream)
Show Homenagem a Nossa Senhora Aparecida	Released: 13 October 2019; Label: Daniel Promoções Artísticas Ltda.; Format: DVD, digital download		
40 Anos - Celebra João Paulo & Daniel	Released: 12 May 2023; Label: Daniel Promoções Artísticas Ltda.; Format: Digital download		

==== Extended plays (EP) ====
Title	Album details	Certifications	Sales
30 Anos - O Musical	Released: 8 July 2014; Label: Sony Music; Format: EP, digital download		
Daniel em Casa	Released: 26 March 2021; Label: Daniel Promoções Artísticas Ltda.; Format: Digital download		

==== Box set ====
Title	Album details	Certifications	Sales
Meu Reino Encantado - A Coleção	Released: 29 November 2006; Label: Warner Music; Format: Box set		

==== Compilation albums ====
Title	Album details	Certifications	Sales
Todo Amor de Daniel	Released: 2001; Label: Warner Music; Format: CD		
Momentos Mágicos - Ao Vivo	Released: 2002; Label: Warner Music; Format: CD, digital download		
Grandes Sucessos	Released: 2003; Label: Warner Music; Format: CD		
Warner 30 Anos	Released: 2006; Label: Warner Music; Format: CD		
Warner 30 Anos: Meu Reino Encantado	Released: 2006; Label: Warner Music; Format: CD		
Nova Série	Released: 2007; Label: Warner Music; Format: CD		
Nova Série: Meu Reino Encantado	Released: 2007; Label: Warner Music; Format: CD		
O Melhor do Bailão do Daniel	Released: 2007; Label: Warner Music; Format: CD		BRA: 30,000
O Melhor do Bailão Romântico do Daniel	Released: 2007; Label: Warner Music; Format: CD		
Em Foco	Released: 2007; Label: Som Livre; Format: CD	ABPD: Gold	BRA: 60,000
Para Sempre Meu Reino	Released: 2010; Label: Warner Music; Format: CD		
Declaração de Amor: Vol. 1	Released: 2010; Label: Warner Music; Format: CD		
Declaração de Amor: Vol. 2	Released: 2010; Label: Warner Music; Format: CD		

== Filmography ==
Film
Year	Film	Role
2009	O Menino da Porteira	Diogo
2003	Didi, o Cupido Trapalhão	Romeu
1999	Xuxa Requebra	Felipe Macedo

Television
Year	Title	Role
2026	Coração Acelerado	himself
2024	Viver Sertanejo	himseif
2010	Araguaia	himself
2009	Paraíso	Zé Camillo
2005	América	himself
1998	Planeta Xuxa	TV host (during Xuxa's maternity leave)
