= Suzana Alves =

Brazilian model and sex symbol (born 1978)

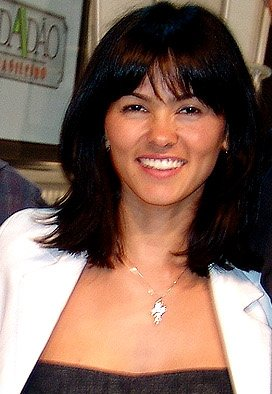
- Born: Suzana Ferreira Alves; August 3, 1978 (age 47); São Paulo, Brazil
- Other name: Tiazinha (Auntie)
- Height: 5 ft 3 in (1.60 m)
- Website: www.suzanaalves.com.br

Suzana Ferreira Alves, also known as Tiazinha ("Auntie") (born São Paulo, August 3, 1978), is a Brazilian actress, ballerina, media personality, and former model. She was a major sex symbol in late 1990s Brazil.

She started as a dancer in the TV show H on Rede Bandeirantes. The "Auntie" character was a dominatrix woman dressed in lingerie who would dance and participate in a game where Suzana would wax male participants in a live stage show. The participants answered general knowledge questions; if the answer was incorrect, they were punished with waxing; if correct, they were rewarded with money prizes and lap dances from "Auntie".

She also released an album and starred her own action adventure TV-series, As Aventuras de Tiazinha (The Adventures of Tiazinha).

Ever since her departure from H in 2000, Alves has invested in her acting career, mostly on stage. She appeared in four episodes of Amigas & Rivais during 2007.

Alves is married since 2010 to retired tennis player Flávio Saretta, with whom she has a son.

== Filmography ==
Year	Title	Character
1994	A Caixa	Ruth
1999	Xuxa Requebra	Motogirl
2006	Boleiros 2 - Vencedores e Vencidos	Lurdinha
2006	O Cheiro do Ralo	Samanta Rose
2008	Falsa Loura	Milena
2009	Fábrica dos Sonhos	Kelly
2011	Uma Noite em Sampa	Arlete
