= Joana Prado =

Brazilian model (born 1976)

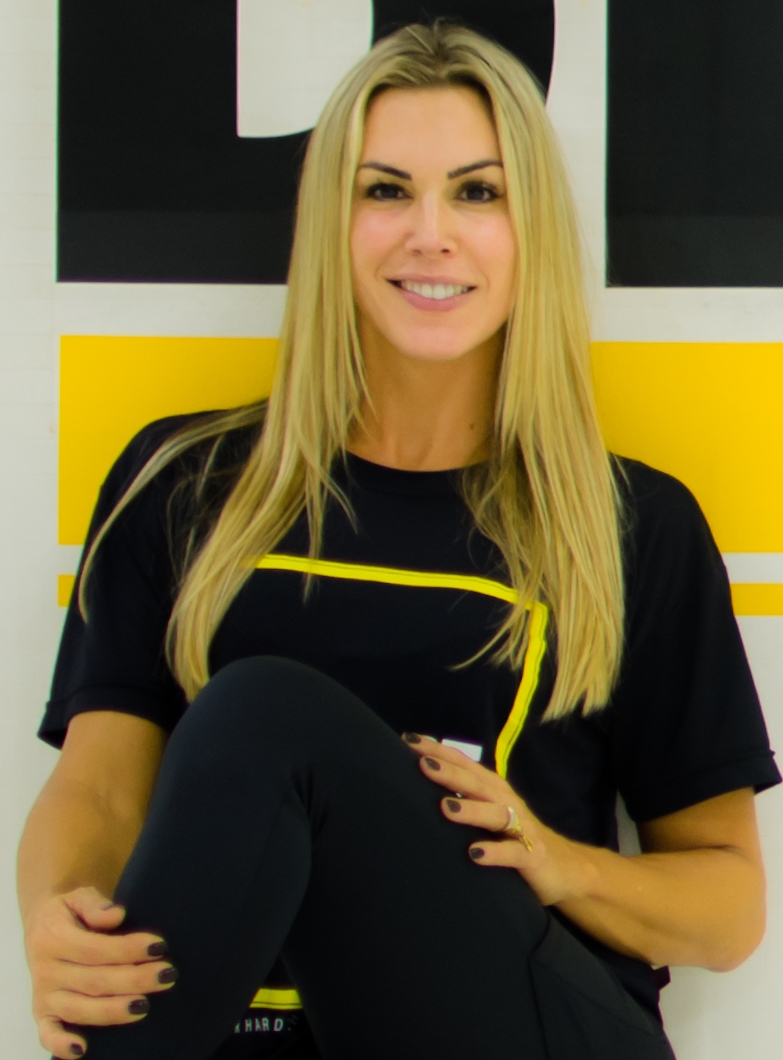
- Prado in 2016
- Born: June 22, 1976 (age 50); São Paulo, Brazil
- Occupation: Businesswoman
- Spouse: Vitor Belfort (m. 2003)

Joana Prado Belfort (born June 22, 1976) is a Brazilian-American businesswoman and former model.

== Early life ==
Prado was born in São Paulo, daughter of engineer Jair Prado and Mercedes Prado and sister of Tiago Prado. While she was studying administration and foreign trade in college, she was model and girl advertising for brands like 775, Sexy Machine, and M.Officer.

Prado holds dual Brazilian and American citizenship.

== Career ==
Prado worked as a model and during this period she also studied business administration with an emphasis on foreign trade. She was advertising girl of some brands like: 775, Sexy Machine, M.Officer and others. She began working on TV as a stage assistant for Luciano Huck's Program H, at Rede Bandeirantes, later creating a character called Feiticeira ("Sorceress"), which made her known worldwide. At first, Prado had many difficulties with accepting the character, due to the conservative upbringing she received from her parents. She decided to leave her university education and take theater classes with Beto Silveira in order to better understand and incorporate the character, who later became Brazil's greatest sex symbol in the 90's.

Prado also became a reporter on a TV sports show called "In Shape with Feiticeira" on TV Bandeirantes, where she interviewed athletes from various sports about their daily training and interests. At the same time she participated in a radio show called Pânico as part of the broadcasting staff. Prado posed three times for the Brazilian Playboy magazine, with the first time being the most sold issue ever (1,234,288 copies).

With the absolute success of her TV character, Prado began to appear in numerous advertising campaigns. In March 2002 she left TV Bandeirantes and went to SBT, where she participated in the second edition of reality show "The House of Artists". On this reality show she re-established her relationship with the MMA fighter Vitor Belfort, whom she had already dated for 7 months in the year 2000. Prado finished fourth overall in the show.

After leaving the program Prado dedicated a year of her life to study radio, communication, and television, and in 2003 she was hired by RecordTV to join the Note & Anote program as a reporter, where she worked for two years until her first son, Davi, was born.

In 2006 Prado returned to work on TV Bandeirantes, but this time as a reporter in the Pra Valer show, by Claudete Troiano, where she worked until the birth of Vitória, the couple's second child. In the meantime, Prado encouraged Belfort to get himself back into shape as a MMA contender.

In 2009, Prado became pregnant with Kyara, the couple's third and last child, and started presenting the web show called Absoluta, aimed at pregnant women. The goal of the show was to provide information about what to do and do not during pregnancy and to encourage natural birth, which is rare in Brazil. Kyara's live birth on this program attracted a record number of viewers for a web show.

In 2014 Prado built the FortFit Academy in Barra da Tijuca, Rio de Janeiro. Currently known as Belfort Gym, the venture is a success with more than 500 customers practicing various types of activities such as CrossFit, martial arts, spinning, and Pilates, among others.

In 2017, Prado began investing in a new venture in Coconut Creek, Florida, the Belfort Fitness Lifestyle, a new gym model with a low investment and high profit concept.

Currently, Prado lives in Florida with her husband and three children. She runs the career of Vitor Belfort in cooperation with their team and lawyers. She also takes care of the family businesses, including real estate holdings and the gyms in Brazil and the USA.
