= Scheila Carvalho =

Brazilian model (born 1973)

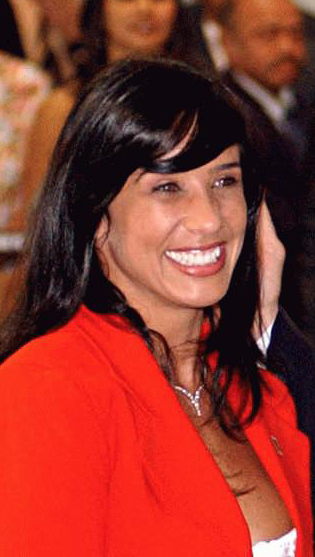
- Born: September 24, 1973 (age 52); Juiz de Fora
- Occupation(s): Model, dancer

Scheila Carvalho Ladeira (September 24, 1973, in Juiz de Fora) is a Brazilian model, dancer, and latterly sex symbol. She rose to prominence as a dancer for axé act É o Tchan!, and has gone on to appear in numerous magazine photo shoots, including several for the Brazilian Playboy and Sexy. She is married to Jorge Antonio da Silva Santos (also known as "Tony Salles") from É o Tchan!. She left the band with Salles in 2005 and she currently hosts a TV show in Bahia. She is a Spiritist.

== External reference ==
- Scheila Carvalho at IMDb
