= Playboy (Brazil) =

Brazilian edition of the Playboy magazine

- Issue 413, dated October 2009. Model is actress Juliana Alves.
- Editor-in-chief: Sérgio Xavier Filho
- Former editors: Thales Guaracy; Edson Aran; Rodrigo Velloso; Cynthia de Almeida; Ricardo A. Setti; Juca Kfouri; Mário Escobar de Andrade
- Categories: Men's magazines
- Frequency: Monthly
- Publisher: Editora Abril (1975-2015); PBB Entertainment (2016-2018)
- First issue: August 1975 (as Revista do Homem); 1978 (As Playboy)
- Country: Brazil
- Based in: São Paulo
- Language: Portuguese
- Website: Official site

The Brazilian edition of Playboy was a local franchise of Playboy magazine. Established in 1975 by Editora Abril, it was only the fourth overall international version of the magazine, following Germany, Italy and France.

== History ==
When Editora Abril founder Victor Civita asked his son Roberto Civita to drop his job at the Tokyo offices of Time in 1958 to instead join him at Abril, Roberto accepted on the condition that he could create three new publications: a Time-like weekly news magazine (Veja), a Fortune-like business magazine (Exame), and the last of those to get into print, a local issue of Playboy.

By the mid-1970s, Roberto had struck a deal with Playboy Enterprises, and was asked by his father to consult the Ministry of Justice given the military dictatorship in place had a censorship policy on the press. Minister Armando Falcão vetoed the publication, saying that "no publication under the name Playboy in Brazil, no matter its content." Seeing a loophole, Roberto submitted the already done preprint for issue 1 under the name A Revista do Homem (Men's Magazine), and got approved. The first issue of Homem got on newsstands in August 1975, and the magazine was allowed to use its trademark name only as of 1978.

The Brazilian edition follows the general guidelines of the original magazine in the United States, featuring the trademark sections of the magazine, such as the monthly interview, the 20 Questions interview and the centerfold pictorial featuring the "Miss of the month", which most of the time, but not always, coincides with the month's "star" (cover). But the Brazilian installment has some sections of its own, such as Coelhinhas (Bunnies), which features unknown models photographed by freelance photographers (not affiliated with the magazine), and Click, which features candid pictures of celebrities of all calibers in seemingly revealing situations.

The magazine in Brazil also makes a much heavier use of celebrities to attract its target public, especially telenovela actresses and TV hostesses. This strategy is facilitated by the Brazilian general perception of the Playboy magazine as a tasteful medium for nude pictorials, as opposed to other adult magazines published in the country. This perception also attracts young models looking to use the exposition to launch their careers. Playboy also makes extensive use of circumstantial celebrities, such as stage assistants from TV shows or women who took part recently in TV reality shows.

In that aspect, the Brazilian version of the reality show Big Brother, created by Dutch production company Endemol and produced in Brazil by Globo TV, has been the main source of models for the magazine. Between May 2002 (about two months after the first season concluded on Globo) and August 2007, 13 female participants from that reality show have posed for the magazine, always on the cover; and two of them (Sabrina Sato and Antonela Avellaneda) posed twice, for a total of 15 covers on the magazine. Playboy has not, however, monopolized the nude or revealing pictorials featuring former participants of the TV show, since a few of the participants ultimately chose to appear in other adult publications, such as SEXY Magazine and the lad magazine VIP the last one, also from Abril). In a few of those cases, however, Playboy was not interested in signing on the former participants because it had been revealed that they had already posed for competing publications prior to participating in the reality show on Globo TV.

The record holders for most covers are actress and former model Luma de Oliveira, and dancer Scheila Carvalho, with a total of five covers each (Luma: September 1987, March 1988, March 1990, May 2001 and January 2005; Scheila: February 1998, September 1999, November 2000, December 2001, April 2009). The best-selling issue is the December 1999 issue with Joana Prado "Feiticeira" in the cover, with 1.25 million magazines sold.

In September 2006, Brazilian Playboy featured three Varig air hostesses (Juliana Neves, Sabrina Knop and Patricia Kreusburg) posing nude. At the time Varig was becoming defunct and the magazine's editors decided to follow the steps of the American edition, which featured nude employees of another defunct company, Enron.

In 2015, the fortieth year of publication, Abril decided to stop publishing Playboy due to costs given the diminishing circulation could not offset the licensing royalties. Eventually a new deal was set with PBB Entertainment to relaunch the publication starting in March 2016. After ten print issues of irregular periodicity, PBB announced in April 2018 the next editions would be digital. In July of the same year, it was confirmed the Brazilian Playboy was being shut down, with PBB Entertainment having ended the contract with PLBY Group a few months prior.
