= Foreign hostages in Iraq =

Members of the Iraqi insurgency began taking foreign hostages beginning in April 2004. Since then, they have captured more than 200 foreigners and thousands of Iraqis; among them, dozens of hostages were killed and others rescued or freed. In 2004, executions of captives were often filmed, and many were beheaded. The number of recorded killings later decreased significantly, but many hostages remain missing. In the summer of 2004, the United States Department of State set up the Hostage Working Group, organized by the U.S. Embassy in Baghdad, to monitor foreign hostages in Iraq.

The motives for these kidnappings include:

- influencing foreign governments with troops in Iraq to withdraw
- influencing foreign companies with workers in Iraq to leave the country
- demanding ransom money
- creating terror in Iraq
- discouraging travel to Iraq
- prisoner exchange

The following is a list of known civilian foreign nationals who have been taken hostage in Iraq.

== Coalition ==
Country	Year	Released	Killed	Captivity	Notes	Refs
Australia	2004	1	0	2 days	John Martinkus, a journalist for SBS Television, was kidnapped on October 16, 2004. He was released on October 18, 2004, after his captors used Google to verify his status as a journalist.	
Australia	2005	1	0	46 days	Douglas Wood, a construction engineer was kidnapped along with two Iraqi business associates on April 30, 2005. The two associates were later killed. Wood was rescued on June 15, 2005 in a raid carried out by the Iraqi Army.	
Bulgaria	2004	0	2	Less than 14 days (Lazov); Less than 23 days (Kepov)	Georgi Lazov and Ivailo Kepov, two truck drivers, were seized on June 29, 2004, near Mosul. Lazov's beheaded body was found on July 14, 2004; Kepov's on July 22, 2004.	
Brazil	2005	0	1	807 days (up until the recovery of the body)	João José de Vasconcellos Júnior, a civil engineer from Odebrecht, was kidnapped in Baiji. A few days later, a video broadcast by Al Jazeera showed his documents as proof he was indeed taken hostage. Kidnappers soon ceased all forms of communication and his body was anonymously delivered to the American Army 2 years later. It is not known how he died, with some versions stating he bled to death two days lader of his abduction.	
Czech Republic	2004	3	0	5 days	Reporter Michal Kubal and cameraman Petr Klíma, of Czech Television and Vít Pohanka from Czech Radio were kidnapped on April 11, 2004. They were freed April 16, 2004.	
Denmark	2004	0	1	Less than 1 day	Henrik Frandsen was abducted on April 11, 2004, while working on a sewage project, and found dead the next day.	
Italy	2004	3	1	Unknown	Umberto Cupertino, Maurizio Agliana, and Salvatore Stefio were captured with security guard Fabrizio Quattrocchi on April 29, 2004. Quattrocchi was reported killed in a video released on April 14, 2004. The others were freed on June 8, 2004.	
Italy	2004	0	1	Unknown	Enzo Baldoni, a reporter taken hostage in August and shown being killed in a video released on August 26, 2004. His Iraqi driver-translator was killed during the abduction.	
Italy	2004	2	0	21 days	Simona Pari and Simona Torretta, aid workers for a Bridge to Baghdad, were kidnapped along with two Iraqis on September 7, 2004. They were freed on September 28, 2004. Italy allegedly paid $5 million in ransom for their release.	
Italy	2004	0	1	Unknown	Iyad Anwar Wali, an Italian-Iraqi businessman, was reported killed on October 2, 2004, with his Turkish Partner, Yalmaz Dabja.	
Italy	2004	0	1	Less than 1 day	Salvatore Santoro, a photojournalist, reported kidnapped and killed on December 16, 2004.	
Italy	2005	1	0	28 days	Giuliana Sgrena, a reporter for Il Manifesto, was kidnapped on February 4, 2005. Her Iraqi driver and Iraqi translator managed to escape. When she was released on March 4, 2005, her car was shot at by US troops, and Italian agent Nicola Calipari was killed. Italy allegedly paid $6 million in ransom for her release.	
Japan	2004	3	0	7 days	Soichiro Koriyama, Noriaki Imai, and Nahoko Takato, Japanese citizens were kidnapped on April 8, 2004, but released on April 15, 2004.	
Japan	2004	0	1	Less than 4 days	Shosei Koda, a tourist, was confirmed beheaded on October 30, 2004. He had been kidnapped on October 26, 2004, by Zarqawi's group.	
Japan	2005	0	1	Unknown	Akihiko Saito, a security contractor, was kidnapped after a convoy attack and reported killed on May 28, 2005.	
North Macedonia	2004	0	3	Unknown	Dalibor Lazarevski, Dragan Marković, and Zoran Naskovski, were kidnapped on August 21, 2004, near Baghdad. They worked for Soufan Engineering, which caters to the needs of the US military and its private contractors. On October 22, 2004, the Macedonian government confirmed the three had been killed.	
North Macedonia	2006	2	0	4 days	Faruk Ademi and Rasim Ramadani, two contractors working for a cleaning company at Basra International Airport were abducted on February 16, 2006. They were released on February 20, 2006.	
The Philippines	2004	1	0	13 days	Angelo de la Cruz, a truck driver, was taken hostage on July 7, 2004. De la Cruz was released after the Philippines withdrew their 51 troops in the country on July 20, 2004. His Iraqi security guard was killed during the abduction.	
The Philippines	2004	1	0	8 months	Roberto Tarongoy, kidnapped on November 1, 2004. He was released eight months later, on June 22, 2005 after a ransom was paid.	
Poland	2004	1	0	7 days	Jerzy Kos, a contractor kidnapped on June 1, 2004, was freed in an operation on June 8, 2004.	
Poland	2004	1	0	23 days	Teresa Borcz Khalifa, a Polish aid worker, was kidnapped on October 28, 2004. She was freed on November 20, 2004.	
Romania	2005	3	0	55 days	Marie Jeanne Ion, Sorin Dumitru Miscoci, and Ovidiu Ohanesian, journalists, were kidnapped on March 28, 2005 in Baghdad. Their Iraqi-American translator, Mohammad Munaf, also went missing with them. They were released on May 22, 2005. Munaf was accused by the Romanian government of organizing the kidnapping and was arrested.	
South Korea	2004	0	1	23 days	Kim Sun-il, a translator, was kidnapped on May 30, 2004 by Zarqawi's group. He was beheaded in a video released June 22, 2004.	
Ukraine	2004	5	0	1 day	Five energy workers from Interenergoservis were kidnapped on April 12, 2004, along with 3 Russians and a man immediately released. The rest were released the next day with the insurgents apologizing, noting that they did not realise they were Russian and Ukrainian.	
United Kingdom	2004	1	0	6 days	Gary Teeley, a laundry contractor at an American base outside Nasiriyah, was kidnapped on April 5, 2004. He was freed by his kidnappers on April 11, 2004.	
United Kingdom	2004	1	0	1 day	James Brandon, a freelance journalist for The Sunday Telegraph, was kidnapped after 30 masked gunmen stormed into his hotel in Basra on August 12, 2004. He was freed on August 13, 2004, by his captors.	
United Kingdom	2004	0	1	Around 18 days	Kenneth John Bigley, a civil engineer, who was kidnapped September 16, 2004. The two Americans kidnapped with him were beheaded and Bigley was beheaded around October 7.	
United Kingdom	2005	1	0	116 days	Norman Frank Kember, an aid worker for Christian Peacemaker Teams, was kidnapped along with two Canadians and an American on November 27, 2005. Their Iraqi driver and Iraqi translator were not taken. He was released as the result of a Coalition operation on March 23, 2006. See 2005-2006 Christian Peacemaker hostage crisis.	
United Kingdom	2005	1	0	5 days	Phillip Sands, a freelance reporter, was abducted on December 26, 2005, along with his Iraqi interpreter and Iraqi driver. His abductors were gunmen who planned on using him to get Britain to pull all troops out of Iraq and release all Iraqi prisoners. Phillip was filmed pleading for his life. However, the tape was never sent to Al Jazeera. On December 31, 2005, Phillip and his two colleagues were rescued by U.S. troops.	
United Kingdom	2007	1	4	At least 399 days (Swindlehurst, Creswell, MacLachlan, McMenemy); 946 days (Moore)	Jason Swindlehurst, Jason Creswell, Alec MacLachlan and Alan McMenemy, four security contractors, were kidnapped with Peter Moore, a computer consultant, on May 29, 2007 from the Iraqi Finance Ministry. Their captors were Shia militiamen who demanded the withdrawal of British troops from Iraq and release of all Iraqi prisoners in exchange for the hostages' release. Creswell, McMenemy and Moore appeared in videos released in November 2007, February 2008 and July 2008. The captors claimed that Swindlehurst killed himself on May 25, 2008. However, that turned out to be a lie. The bodies of Swindlehurst and Creswell were recovered on June 19, 2009. On July 29, 2009, it was revealed that Maclachlan and McMenemy had also been killed. MacLachlan's body was recovered on September 1, 2009. McMenemy's body was recovered on January 20, 2012. Moore was released on December 30, 2009 in exchange for Qais Khazali. In December 2009 evidence uncovered during an investigation by The Guardian newspaper and Guardian Films linked the Quds Force to the kidnappings of Moore, Swindlehurst, MacLachlan, Creswell and McMenemy.	
United Kingdom	2008	1	0	64 days	Richard Butler, a journalist working for CBS News, was kidnapped in Basra on February 10, 2008, with his Iraqi interpreter Aqeel Khadhir. The translator was freed on February 13, 2008. Butler was rescued on April 14, 2008 by Iraqi forces.	
United States	2003			Unknown	Kirk von Ackermann, a contractor for a Turkish company, disappeared on October 9, 2003 after leaving a meeting at FOB Pacesetter. His vehicle was found abandoned later that same day.	
United States	2004	1	0	22 days	Thomas Hamill, a truck driver, was seized in a deadly convoy attack on April 9, 2004 (see 2004 Iraq KBR Convoy Ambush). He was later shown in a video, but escaped on May 1, 2004.	
United States	2004			Unknown	Timothy Edward Bell, a contractor for Halliburton, went missing on April 9, 2004. He was never seen in a video and was declared dead in 2010.	
United States	2004	0	1	Less than 30 days	Nicholas Evan Berg, a 26-year-old freelancer, went missing on 9 April 2004. His widely publicized beheading was shown in a video on 11 May 2004. His body had been found the day before. Abu Musab al-Zarqawi personally beheaded Berg.	
United States	2004			Unknown	Aban Abdel Malek Mahmoud Elias, an Iraqi-American engineer from Denver, was shown being held hostage in a video on May 3, 2004. He has not been seen or heard from since.	
United States	2004	1	0	9 days	Micah Garen, a freelance reporter, was kidnapped along with his Iraqi translator, Amir Doushi, on August 13, 2004, near Nasiriyah. They were freed on August 22, 2004.	
United States	2004	0	2	4 days (Armstrong); Up to 45 days (Hensley)	Olin Eugene "Jack" Armstrong and Jack Hensley, two contractors for the construction firm Gulf Supplies Commercial Services of the United Arab Emirates, were kidnapped along with a Briton named Kenneth John Bigley on September 16, 2004. Armstrong was beheaded on 20 September 2004. Abu Musab al-Zarqawi personally beheaded Armstrong. The following day, the group beheaded Hensley, and threatened to kill Bigley, unless the United States met their demands to free all women prisoners in Iraqi jails. Bigley was beheaded in October 2004.	
United States	2004	1	0	2 days	Paul Taggart, a freelance photographer, was kidnapped on October 10, 2004. He was released on October 12, 2004.	
United States	2004	3	0	9 days (Dewari); 233 days (Tarangoy); 310 days (Hallums)	Roy Hallums, an employee of a Saudi trading company, was seized along with Roberto Tarangoy, Inus Dewari and three Iraqi security guards on November 1, 2004, in Baghdad. The three Iraqi security guards were later released. Dewari was released on November 10, 2004. Hallums was shown in a video aired on January 25, 2005. Tarongoy was released on June 22, 2005. On September 7, 2005, Hallums was freed in an operation conducted by Delta Force.	
United States	2004			Unknown	Radim Sadeq Mohammed Sadeq, also called "Dean Sadek", a businessman kidnapped on November 2, 2004, in Baghdad. He was shown in a video that month and in another video dated Christmas Eve but released in late January. He has not been seen or heard from since. His kidnappers demanded the release of Iraqi prisoners.	
United States	2005			Unknown	Jeffrey Ake, a water bottling plant contractor, was kidnapped on April 11, 2005, and shown in a videotape two days later. He has not been seen or heard from since. His kidnappers demanded $2 million in exchange for his release. After three weeks of negotiations, the kidnappers cut off all communication. Ake is presumed dead and his family held a private funeral for him in the summer of 2014.	
United States	2005	0	1	5 hours	Steven Charles Vincent, a journalist, was kidnapped along with his Iraqi translator, Nouriya Itais Wadi, in Basra on 2 August 2005. They were bound, gagged, and taken to an undisclosed location where for five hours they were beaten and interrogated, then taken to the outskirts of town and shot. They were found by British and Iraqi policemen but Vincent was dead, shot in the back at close range. Wadi survived the attack, despite having been shot three times.	
United States	2005	0	1	Up to 103 days	Thomas William Fox, an aid worker working for Christian Peacemaker Teams, was reported kidnapped on November 27, 2005, along with two Canadians and a Briton. Their Iraqi driver and Iraqi translator were not taken. His body was found in a rubbish heap on 10 March 2006 (see 2005–2006 Christian Peacemaker hostage crisis).	
United States	2005	0	1	Up to 13 days	Ronald Alan Schulz, an electrician, was reported kidnapped on 6 December 2005. On 19 December 2005, the Islamic Army released a video showing Schulz's killing in which he is shot in the head after the U.S. refused to release all Iraqi prisoners. His remains were found in September 2008 and confirmed to be Schulz's the next month.	
United States	2006	1	0	82 days	Jill Carroll, a freelance reporter for the Boston-based Christian Science Monitor, was kidnapped in West Baghdad on January 7, 2006, by unknown gunmen. Her Iraqi translator was killed during the abduction. Her Iraqi driver escaped. Her kidnappers demanded the release of all female Iraqi prisoners. She was shown in four videos during her captivity. She was released on March 30, 2006.	
United States	2006	0	3	Up to 471 days	John Roy Young, Joshua Mark Munns, Paul Christopher Reuben and Jonathon Michael Cote, four security contractors, were kidnapped with an Austrian named Bert Nussbaumer on November 16, 2006. They appeared in two hostage videos released in December 2006 and January 2007. The kidnapped contractors stated in their video that they would not be released until the following demands had been made; the withdrawal of American troops from Iraq and the release of all Iraqi prisoners in exchange for the hostages's release. Four fingers were sent to U.S. authorities in February 2008. The fingers belonged to Munns, Reuben, Cote and Nussbaumer. The bodies of Young, Nussbaumer, Munns and Reuben were recovered in March 2008. Cote's body was recovered in April 2008.	
United States	2007	0	1	Up to 451 days	Ronald J. Withrow, a contractor, was kidnapped along with his translator and driver on 5 January 2007. The translator and driver were found dead the next day. One of Withrow's fingers was sent to U.S. authorities in February 2008. His body was recovered in March 2008.	
United States	2010	1	0	61 days	Issa T. Salomi, a civilian contractor, was kidnapped by a Shiite militia group on January 23, 2010, and shown in a video in February 2010. His kidnappers demanded the release of Iraqi prisoners, the withdrawal of all foreign troops from Iraq, the prosecution of security contractors employed by Blackwater Worldwide and compensation to Iraqi families. He was released on March 25, 2010 in exchange for four Iraqi prisoners.	
United States	2026	1	0	8 days	Shelly Renee Kittleson, a journalist, was kidnapped on March 31, 2026, in Baghdad. She was released on April 7, 2026 in a prisoner exchange.	

== Non-coalition ==
Country	Year	Released	Killed	Captivity	Notes	Refs
Algeria	2005	0	3	Up to 6 days	Ali Belaroussi, Algerian Chargé d'affaires, and Azzedin Belkadi, Algerian diplomatic attache, were kidnapped along with their driver on July 21, 2005 in Baghdad.The Algerian government, on July 27, 2005, said the diplomats had been killed.	
Austria	2006	0	1	Up to 501 days	Bert Nussbaumer, a contractor, was kidnapped along with four Americans on November 16, 2006. They appeared in two hostage videos released in December 2006 and January 2007. Their kidnappers demanded the withdrawal of America troops from Iraq and the release of all Iraqi prisoners in exchange for the hostages' release. One of Nussbaumer's fingers was sent to U.S. authorities in February 2008. Three of the Americans and Nussbaumer were found dead in March 2008. The other American was found dead in April 2008.	
Bangladesh	2004	1	0	43 days	Abul Kashem, a truck driver, was kidnapped on October 28, 2004, as he ferried supplies to Kuwait. He was freed on December 10, 2004.	
Brazil	2005	0	1	Unknown	João José Vasconcelos, an engineer, was kidnapped on January 19, 2005, in an ambush on the Baghdad Airport road. His body was found more than two years after his kidnapping. It is believed that he died from injuries sustained in the abduction shortly after arriving at the house where his captors planned to hold him.	
Canada	2004			Unknown	Rifat Mohammed Rifat, an Iraqi-born prison worker, was taken hostage on April 8, 2004. He is still missing.	
Canada	2004	1	0	8 days	Fadi Ihsan Fadel, a Syrian-Canadian employed by the International Rescue Committee, was taken hostage in Najaf on April 8, 2004 but released on April 16, 2004.	
Canada	2004	1	0	6 days	Naji al-Kuwaiti, was taken hostage on April 28, 2004, and released on May 4, 2004.	
Canada	2004	1	0	16 days	Fairuz Yamulky was abducted on September 6, 2004. Her driver and another employee were not taken. Yamulky managed to escape with the help of one of her captors sixteen days later.	
Canada	2004	1	0	5 days	Scott Taylor, was a journalist abducted by Ansar al-Islam in Tal Afar on September 9, 2004. He was released five days later.	
Canada	2005	0	1	13 days	Zaid Meerwali, who held dual Canadian-Iraqi citizenship, was seized August 2, 2005, and $250,000 in ransom was demanded. Officials in Canada said, that on August 15, 2005, he had been shot in the head while the family was preparing the ransom money.	
Canada	2005	2	0	447 days	James Loney and Harmeet Singh Sooden, human rights workers with Christian Peacemaker Teams, were kidnapped in Baghdad on November 27, 2005, along with an American and Briton. Their Iraqi driver and Iraqi translator were not taken. They were released as the result of a coalition military operation on March 23, 2006. See 2005-2006 Christian Peacemaker hostage crisis.	
The People's Republic of China	2004	7	0	2 days	Seven workers - Xue Yougui, Lin Jinping, Li Guiwu, Li Guiping, Wei Weilong, Chen Xiaojin, and Lin Kongming - were abducted on April 11, 2004 near Fallujah, but were released on April 13, 2004.	
The People's Republic of China	2005	8	0	4 days	Eight unemployed construction workers were kidnapped by a group calling itself "The Islamic Resistance, al-Numan Brigades" on January 18, 2005, as they tried to leave the country. They were released four days later. The group included three teenagers.	
Cyprus	2005	1	0	Up to 152 days	Garabet Jean Jekerjian, a man with dual Lebanese-Cypriot citizenship, was abducted in August 2005. He was released on December 31, 2005 in exchange for $200,000 ransom.	
Egypt	2004	1	0	17 days	Victor Tawfiq Gerges, truck driver, was kidnapped with Turk Bulent Yanik on 1 June 2004. He was released on June 18, 2004.	
Egypt	2004	1	0	13 days	Alsayeid Mohammed Alsayeid Algarabawi, truck driver, was kidnapped on 6 July 2004. He was released on 19 July 2004.	
Egypt	2004	1	0	41 days	Mohammed Ali Sanad, truck driver, was seized with three Indians and three Kenyans on 22 July 2004. He was released on 1 September 2004.	
Egypt	2004	1	0	3 days	Mohamed Mamdouh Qutb, diplomat, was seized in Baghdad on 23 July 2004. He was released on 26 July 2004.	
Egypt	2004	0	1	Unknown	Mohammed Mutawalli, a purported "Egyptian spy", was beheaded in a video on August 10, 2004.	
Egypt	2004	0	1	Up to 9 days	Nasser Juma, contractor, kidnapped on August 27, 2004, his body was found in the town of Baiji, Iraq on 5 September 2004.	
Egypt	2004	6	0	Minimum 4 days	Six employees for Iraqna, the local brand name for Egyptian telecoms giant Orascom, were kidnapped on 24 September 2004, with the first two being released on 28 September 2004.	
Egypt	2005	0	1	Unknown	Ibrahim Mohammed Ismail, 39, driver, 16 January 2005.	
Egypt	2005	4	0	1 day	Four engineers, Mohammed al-Saadi, Hussein Ashour, Waleed Ismail and Sayed Shaaban working for Egyptian telecoms giant Orascom were kidnapped in Baghdad on February 6, 2005. They were freed the next day by US forces.	
Egypt	2005	2	0	1 day	Nabil Tawfiq Sulieman and Matwali Mohammed Salim, engineers for the firm Unitrak, were abducted on a road west of Baghdad, a video on an Islamic website said on 19 March 2005. They were released a day later.	
Egypt	2005	0	1	4 days	Ihab al-Sherif, Egyptian envoy to Iraq, kidnapped in Baghdad on July 3, 2005, and reported killed on July 7, 2005.	
Egypt	2005			Unknown	Samuel Edward, an engineer working for Iraqna Mobile Company, was kidnapped on September 26, 2005, in Baghdad. His Iraqi driver was left unharmed.	
Egypt	2005	0	1	1 day	Ibrahim al-Sayyid al-Hilali, translator, abducted 9 December 2005.	
France	2004	2	0	122 days	Christian Chesnot and Georges Malbrunot, two reporters, were kidnapped along with their Syrian driver on August 21, 2004. The driver was rescued on November 12. The two journalists were released on December 21. France allegedly paid $15 million in ransom for their release.	
France	2005	1	0	157 days	Florence Aubenas, a reporter for the daily Libération. She disappeared January 5, 2005 but was released with her Iraqi translator, Hussein Hanoun al-Saadi, on June 11. France allegedly paid $10 million in ransom for their release.	
France	2005	1	0	23 days	Bernard Planche, a water engineer, was kidnapped in Mansour on December 5, 2005. He was freed on January 7, 2006, when his captors fled the house where they were holding him during a military operation.	
Germany	2005	1	0	23 days	Susanne Osthoff, an archaeologist, was kidnapped along with her Iraqi driver on November 25, 2005, according to the German Foreign Ministry. They were released on December 18, 2005, after Germany allegedly paid the kidnappers $5 million ransom. It is also speculated that Germany released Mohammed Ali Hammadi in exchange for Osthoff's release.	
Germany	2006	2	0	Up to 98 days	Thomas Nitzschke and Rene Braeunlich, two engineers, were kidnapped by gunmen in Baiji on January 24, 2006. Their interpreter and driver were not taken. They appeared in four videos and their kidnappers demanded that Germany end its cooperation with the Iraqi regime, close its mission in Baghdad, ensure that all German businesses cease dealings there, and the release of all Iraqi prisoners held by US forces. On May 2, 2006, the German government announced the two had been freed. Germany allegedly paid $5 million ransom for their release.	
Germany	2007	1	0	154 days (Hannalore); Unknown (Sinan)	Sinan Krause, a technician at the Iraqi Foreign Ministry, was kidnapped in Baghdad on February 6, 2007, along with his mother Hannelore, who worked for the Austrian embassy in Baghdad. Their kidnappers demanded that Germany withdraw its troops from Afghanistan. Hannalore was shown in three videos during her captivity before being released on July 10, 2007, but Sinan hasn't been seen or heard from since a video was released on September 11, 2007. The video was recorded before Hannelore was released. It showed Sinan saying goodbye to his mother. Their kidnappers issued a final 10-day deadline in the video for Germany to withdraw its troops from Afghanistan. They threatened to kill Sinan if their demand was not met. On April 24, 2008, his father appealed to the captors to release his son. The kidnappers ignored the plea and Sinan's fate is unknown.	
Germany	2020	1	0	4 days	Hella Mewis, an arts curator, was kidnapped by armed militants in Baghdad on July 20, 2020. She was freed by Iraq military on July 24, 2020.	
India	2004	3	0	41 days	July 22, 2004: Antaryami, Sukhdev Singh, and Tilak Raj – Kuwait and Gulf Link (KGL, a Kuwaiti transport company working for the US military) truck drivers were seized in Fallujah during the Iraq War by a little known militant group calling itself the "Islamic Secret Army", other abductees included an Egyptian and three Kenyans. They were released September 1, 2004 after KGL paid about half a million US dollars in ransom; the negotiators from the Indian side included ambassador to Iraq B. B. Tyagi, ambassador to Oman Talmiz Ahmad, ambassador to Kuwait Swashpawan Singh, diplomat Zikrur Rahman and E. Ahamed the Minister of State for External Affairs.Indian journalist V. Sudarshan's Anatomy of an Abduction: How the Indian Hostages in Iraq were Freed (2008) provides a detailed report of the kidnapping.	
India	2014	1	39	Unknown	Forty Indian migrant workers — from Punjab, Himachal Pradesh, Bihar and West Bengal — went missing in June 2014 after Mosul fell to the Islamic State. In 2015, one of them, Harjit Masih, managed to flee from the clutches of ISIL and said all other Indians were killed in the mass executions in ISIL-occupied Mosul. But the External Affairs Minister Sushma Swaraj refused to buy his claims then. In July, 2017, she said she would not declare the missing persons dead until she had a concrete evidence. Swaraj informed the Parliament of India that "sources who gave the government the confidence of not abandoning the search for the abducted Indians in Iraq include a head of state and a foreign minister of another country." She had then refused to disclose the identity of the sources, citing "diplomatic confidentiality". On 20 March 2018, Swaraj declared in the parliament that 39 missing Indian workers had been killed, "I have concrete proof that 39 Indians have been killed. We wanted to give the families closure". The physical remains of the dead were repatriated by the government in a special aircraft.	
India	2014	46	0	5 days	46 Indian nurses were taken hostage on June 29, 2014 by the Islamic State in Iraq and the Levant (ISIL) from the Tikrit Teaching Hospital in Tikrit in central Iraq, when it fell to the jihadist group during the First Battle of Tikrit. Most of the nurses had recently immigrated to Iraq in search for better employment opportunities despite the ongoing war. The city of Tikrit had fallen under siege by ISIL, weeks prior to formal hostilities, in early June and the hospital had run out of food supplies which were later provided by an official of the Iraqi Ministry of Health. The official and two Iraqi soldiers who were guarding the hospital left days prior to the takeover by ISIL on June 29, as had the local Iraqi nurses weeks ago. ISIL first moved the nurses to the hospital's basement and initially refused to hand them over. After negotiations by the Embassy of India in Baghdad, led by ambassador Ajay Kumar Amban and former ambassador B. B. Tyagi, the group agreed to release the hostages in Mosul. They were shifted to Mosul by ISIL and handed over to Indian officials on July 4, 2014, the officials took them to Erbil and they were flown out to India from the Erbil International Airport. The majority of the nurses were from the state of Kerala and chief minister Oommen Chandy kept in touch with the hostages throughout the ordeal. The nurses later stated they were treated well by ISIL militants, some of whom they had treated during the initial takeover of the Tikrit hospital. Two 2017 Indian films are based on the incident, Take Off (2017) and Tiger Zinda Hai (2017).	
Indonesia	2004	2	0	Around 17 days	Istiqomah binti Misnad and Casingkem binti Aspin, two female workers of an electricity firm were kidnapped along with six Iraqis and two Lebanese in late September 2004. They appeared in a video broadcast on Al Jazeera on September 30, 2004. The Islamic Army demanded that Indonesia free Abu Bakar Bashir in exchange for the release of the two women. Bashir refused to be released for the two Indonesian women and Indonesia also said it would not free him. The Islamic Army also demanded that the Lebanese government withdraw all nationals working in Iraq for the release of the two Lebanese men. The women were released on October 4, 2004. The six Iraqis were freed later that month and the two Lebanese were freed for ransom in November 2004.	
Indonesia	2005	2	0	6 days	Meutya Hafid, a reporter, and Budiyanto, a cameraman, were kidnapped along with their Jordanian driver on February 15, 2005. They were freed on February 21, 2005.	
Iran	2004	1	0	54 days	Fereidoun Jahani, an Iranian diplomat, was kidnapped near Karbala on August 4, 2004. He was released on September 27, 2004.	
Iran	2005	6	0	1 day (women); 74 days (men)	Six Iranian pilgrims and their Iraqi guide were kidnapped on November 28, 2005. Their Iraqi driver was wounded but was not abducted. The Iraqi guide and two of the Iranian pilgrims (both women) were released a day later. The four male hostages were released on February 10, 2006.	
Ireland	2004	0	1	28 days	Margaret Hassan, the director of CARE International—who held British, Iraqi and Irish citizenship—was kidnapped in Baghdad on October 19, 2004. Her Iraqi driver and Iraqi unarmed security guard were not taken. She was killed in a video released on November 16, 2004.	
Ireland	2005	1	0	1 day	Rory Carroll, a journalist for the British newspaper The Guardian, was abducted on October 19, 2005, in Baghdad and released the next day.	
Israel	2004	1	0	14 days	Nabil Razouk, an Israeli Arab from East Jerusalem working for the US company Research Triangle International, was kidnapped on April 8, 2004. He was freed on April 22, 2004, after pleas from his family and Palestinians.	
Israel	2023	1	0	903 days	Elizabeth Tsurkov, a researcher, was kidnapped on March 21, 2023. On November 13, 2023, a 4-minute video of Tsurkov was released on Telegram and subsequently aired by Al Rabiaa TV. In the video, which could not be authenticated, Tsurkov says she had been detained for seven months, although she does not identify her captors or location, and she also mentions the Gaza war. Tsurkov also says in the video that she had been working for the CIA and Mossad, which Tsurkov's family denied. Tsurkov was released on September 9, 2025.	
Jordan	2005	1	0	3 days	Ibrahim al-Maharmeh, a businessman, was kidnapped in Baghdad on March 5, 2005. He was released on March 8, 2005, after a ransom was paid.	
Jordan	2005			Unknown	Six Jordanians were kidnapped in May 2005. They appeared in a video that aired on Al-Jazeera on May 6, 2005. They haven't been seen or heard from since.	
Jordan	2006	1	0	63 days	Mahmoud Suleiman Saidat, a driver for the Jordanian embassy in Baghdad, was kidnapped on December 20, 2006. He was later shown on a videotape calling for the release of failed suicide bomber Sajida Mubarak Atrous al-Rishawi. He was released on February 21, 2007.	
Kenya	2004	3	0	41 days	Faiz Khamis Salim, Jalal Mohamed Awadh and Ibrahim Khamis Idd were kidnapped on July 22, 2004, with three Indians and an Egyptian. They were freed September 1, 2004.	
Kenya	2006			Unknown	Moses Munyao and George Noballa, engineers from the Iraqna telephone company, were reported kidnapped after an ambush on January 18, 2006. They haven't been seen or heard from since.	
Lebanon	2004	2	0	2 months	Marwan Ibrahim al-Qassar and Mohammed Jawdat Hussein were kidnapped by the Islamic Army in Iraq in late on in September 2004 along with six Iraqis and two Indonesian women. They appeared in a video broadcast on Al-Jazeera on September 30, 2004. The Islamic Army demanded that Indonesia free Abu Bakar Bashir in exchange for the release of the two women. Bashir refused to be released for the two Indonesian women and Indonesia also said it would not free him. The Islamic Army also demanded that the Lebanese government withdraw all nationals working in Iraq for the release of the two Lebanese men. The Iraqis and the two Indonesian women were freed in October 2004. Marwan and Mohammed were freed in exchange for a ransom in November 2004.	
Lebanon	2004	1	0	7 days	Mohammed Hamad, was kidnapped when he was seven years old on October 22, 2004, after being lured into a car by his captors while he was walking home from school. His captors told him his father was hurt in a car accident. They also told his father that they would behead his son unless they were paid $150,000. They eventually lowered their demand to $70,000 and then lowered it again to $1,725. The $1,725 ransom was paid and Mohammed was released on October 29, 2004.	
Morocco	2005	0	2	Unknown	Driver Abderrahim Boualam and assistant Abdelkrim El Mouhafidim, both workers at the Moroccan embassy in Baghdad, went missing on October 20, 2005 while driving back from Jordan. On October 25, 2005, militants claimed their kidnapping. On November 3, 2005, Al Qaeda in Iraq said in an internet statement that it had decided to kill the two hostages. Ziad Khalaf Raja al-Karbouly later confessed to having arranged the kidnappings. He stated that two Kurds were kidnapped with the Moroccans and were later released.	
Nepal	2004	1	0	5 days	Inus Dewari was kidnapped November 1, 2004, in Baghdad. He was released on November 6, 2004.	
Nepal	2004	0	12	8 days	Gyanendra Shrestha, Manoj Kumar Thakur, Rajendra Kumar Shrestha, Jit Bahadur Thapa, Budha Kumar Shas, Ramesh Khadka, Mangal Bahadur Limbu, Sanjaya Kumar Thakur, Lalan Sing Koirala, Chhok Bahadur Thapa, Prakash Adhikari, and Bishnu Hari Thapa, were twelve Nepalese taken hostage on August 23, 2004. A video from August 31, 2004, showed the beheading of one and the shooting of the eleven others. See also: Nepal hostage crisis and 2004 Nepal riots.	
Palestine	2005			Unknown	Rami Daas, a 26-year-old Palestinian student, was reported by his family as having been kidnapped on May 9, 2005, by gunmen in the northern city of Mosul. His fate is unknown.	
Pakistan	2004	1	0	7 days	Amjad Hafeez, a driver, was kidnapped on June 25, 2004. He was freed on July 2, 2004.	
Pakistan	2004	0	2	Up to 6 days	Azad Hussein Khan, an engineer and Sajjad Naeem, a driver, were kidnapped on July 23, 2004, and killed. Their captors demanded their Kuwaiti company leave Iraq. In a video released on July 29, 2004, their bodies were shown. An Iraqi driver who was held with them was released.	
Pakistan	2005	1	0	2 weeks	An embassy worker was abducted on April 25, 2005, but released two weeks later.	
Pakistan	2005	11	0	9 days	Eleven construction workers were kidnapped from their bus near Nasiriyah on August 13, 2005. They were released August 22, 2005.	
Russia	2004	3	0	1 day	Three energy workers, working for the Interenergoservis, were kidnapped April 12, 2004, along with five Ukrainians and a man immediately released. All were released the next day with the insurgents apologizing, noting that they did not realise they were Russian and Ukrainian.	
Russia	2004	2	0	7 days	Andrei Meshcheryakov and Aleksandr Gordiyenko, employees of Interenergoservis, were kidnapped on May 10, 2004, but released on May 17, 2004.	
Russia	2006	0	5	Up to 22 days	Fyodor Zaitsev, third secretary of the Russian Embassy in Iraq, and embassy employees Rinat Agliulin, Anatoly Smirnov and Oleg Fyodoseyev were abducted after an ambush in Baghdad on June 3, 2006. Another employee, Vitaly Titov, was shot and killed. A group claimed to have executed them on June 21, 2006, and a video released on June 25, 2006, confirmed their deaths. The kidnapper group gave 48 hours to the Putin administration to pull out his troops from Chechnya. The bodies of the four diplomats were found in 2012.	
Somalia	2004	1	0	Several days	Ali Ahmed Mousa, a truck driver, was taken hostage on July 29, 2004, in order to convince his Kuwaiti employer to withdraw from Iraq. He was released several days later.	
South Africa	2006			Unknown	Johann Enslin (48), Andre Durant (38), Hardus Greeff (43) and Callie Scheepers (48), contractors, the so-called Baghdad Four, were abducted at a false roadblock in Baghdad by unidentified men on December 10, 2006, along with five Iraqis. The Iraqis were released two days later. Ten days after the abduction, Andre spoke to his wife briefly in a "proof of life" phone call. There were some talks that these four were still alive in May 2010, but since then there has been no word on their fate and their families later had them declared legally dead.	
Sri Lanka	2004	1	0	43 days	Dinesh Dharmendran Rajaratnam, a truck driver, was kidnapped on October 28, 2004, while ferrying supplies to Kuwait. He was released on December 10, 2004.	
Sudan	2004	1	0	7 days	Noureddin Zakaria, a translator, was kidnapped on October 30, 2004, in Ramadi. He was released on November 6, 2004.	
Sudan	2005	2	0	Up to 1 month	Mohammed Haroun Hamad, a truck driver, was kidnapped along with his colleague Maher Ataya sometime in March 2005. The Islamic Army claimed responsibility in a statement and internet video for the abductions on March 9. The group claimed that a Sharia Council would decide their fates. On April 6, 2005, a second video announced that the Sharia Council decided to release Mohammed and Maher.	
Sudan	2005	0	6	Unknown	Six Sudanese truck drivers were kidnapped by Ansar al-Sunnah in April 2005. The six men were shot dead in a video posted on the Internet.	
Sudan	2005	6	0	8 days	Six Sudanese, including the second secretary at the Sudanese embassy, were abducted in Baghdad on December 23, 2005. They were released on December 31, 2005, after Sudan closed its embassy in Baghdad.	
Sweden	2005	1	0	66 days	Ulf Hjertström, an oil broker, was taken hostage on March 25, 2005. He was released on May 30, 2005.	
Switzerland	2004	2	0	2 days	Two Swiss nationals, a married couple who worked for a NGO, were kidnapped on April 20, 2004, by an unknown group. They were held hostage for 48 hours and released on April 22, 2004, after relatives of the kidnappers from the Obaida tribe promised to pressure Yemeni authorities. Some reports listed the couple as tourists.	
Syria	2004	1	0	83 days	Mohammed al-Joundi, the driver for Christian Chesnot and Georges Malbrunot, was kidnapped on August 21, 2004. He was freed by US troops in Fallujah on November 12, 2004.	
Turkey	2004	1	0	48 days	Bulent Yanik, a truck driver, was kidnapped on June 1, 2004 and released on June 18.	
Turkey	2004	1	1	17 days (Yuce); 47 days (Gezmen)	Aytullah Gezmen, a truck driver, was kidnapped on July 31, 2004, along with his colleague Murat Yuce. A video showing Abu Ayyub al-Masri shooting Yuce in the head was posted on a web site on August 2, 2004. Gezmen was released a month later after he "repented" working for the Americans.	
Turkey	2004	1	1	3 days (Kumdereli); 4 days (Köskal)	Durmus Kumdereli, a truck driver, was kidnapped on August 14, 2004. He was having dinner in a restaurant a few miles away from Mosul. He was kidnapped in that restaurant with his colleague Mustafa Köksal by Abu Musab al-Zarqawi's men. Kumdereli was decapitated on August 17, 2004 by Jama'at al-Tawhid wal-Jihad. Koksal was freed on August 18, 2004.	
Turkey	2004	0	1	Unknown	Maher Kemal, a contractor, was reported beheaded on October 11, 2004.	
Turkey	2004	0	1	Unknown	Razaman Elbu, a truck driver, was kidnapped and executed in a video on October 14, 2004.	
Turkey	2005	1	0	167 days	Abdulkadir Tanrikulu, a businessman, abducted by gunmen from the Bakhan Hotel in Baghdad on January 13, 2005. He was freed on June 29, 2005.	
Turkey	2005	1	0	124 days	Ali Musluoglu, a businessman, was kidnapped in Baghdad on May 19, 2005. He was released on September 20, 2005 in exchange for a $250,000 ransom.	
Turkey	2006	1	0	49 days	Hasan Eskimutlu, a technician, was kidnapped on June 14, 2006, along with his Iraqi translator. His captors sent a video to Aljazeera in which they demanded the Turkish government withdraw its ambassador from Baghdad and that they put pressure on the Iraqi government to free male and female prisoners from U.S. and Iraqi prisons. They were freed on August 2, 2006.	
Turkey	2006	0	1	At least 70 days	Dursun Ali Yildirim Tek, a truck driver, was kidnapped on July 23, 2006. Two videos were broadcast on the internet in which his captors demanded the Turkish government end all cooperation with Iraq and that they shut down the company Tek worked for. In the second video, a 72-hour deadline was issued in which Turkey had to give in to the captors' demands or Tek would be executed. He was killed in October after the deadline passed and his body was found near Baghdad's Airport. His body was identified a month and a half later.	
United Arab Emirates	2006	1	0	14 days	Naji Rashid al-Nuaimi, the first secretary of the UAE's embassy in Baghdad, was abducted by gunmen on May 16, 2006. His captors demanded that the UAE abandon its presence in Iraq. Nuaimi was freed on May 30, 2006. His Sudanese driver was wounded and later died of his injuries.	

== See also ==
- Foreign hostages in Afghanistan
- Foreign hostages in Nigeria
- Foreign hostages in Somalia
