= 2006 in Canada =

- Decades: 1980s; 1990s; 2000s; 2010s; 2020s
- See also: History of Canada; Timeline of Canadian history; List of years in Canada

Events from the year 2006 in Canada.

== Incumbents ==
=== Crown ===
- Monarch – Elizabeth II

=== Federal government ===
- Governor General – Michaëlle Jean
- Prime Minister – Paul Martin (until February 6) then Stephen Harper
- Chief Justice – Beverley McLachlin (British Columbia)
- Parliament – 39th (from April 3)

=== Provincial governments ===
==== Lieutenant governors ====
- Lieutenant Governor of Alberta – Norman Kwong
- Lieutenant Governor of British Columbia – Iona Campagnolo
- Lieutenant Governor of Manitoba – John Harvard
- Lieutenant Governor of New Brunswick – Herménégilde Chiasson
- Lieutenant Governor of Newfoundland and Labrador – Edward Roberts
- Lieutenant Governor of Nova Scotia – Myra Freeman (until September 7) then Mayann Francis
- Lieutenant Governor of Ontario – James Bartleman
- Lieutenant Governor of Prince Edward Island – Léonce Bernard (until July 31) then Barbara Oliver Hagerman
- Lieutenant Governor of Quebec – Lise Thibault
- Lieutenant Governor of Saskatchewan – Lynda Haverstock (until August 1) then Gordon Barnhart

==== Premiers ====
- Premier of Alberta – Ralph Klein (until December 14) then Ed Stelmach
- Premier of British Columbia – Gordon Campbell
- Premier of Manitoba – Gary Doer
- Premier of New Brunswick – Bernard Lord (until October 3) then Shawn Graham
- Premier of Newfoundland and Labrador – Danny Williams
- Premier of Nova Scotia – John Hamm (until February 24) then Rodney MacDonald
- Premier of Ontario – Dalton McGuinty
- Premier of Prince Edward Island – Pat Binns
- Premier of Quebec – Jean Charest
- Premier of Saskatchewan – Lorne Calvert

=== Territorial governments ===
==== Commissioners ====
- Commissioner of Yukon – Geraldine Van Bibber
- Commissioner of Northwest Territories – Tony Whitford
- Commissioner of Nunavut – Ann Meekitjuk Hanson

==== Premiers ====
- Premier of the Northwest Territories – Joe Handley
- Premier of Nunavut – Paul Okalik
- Premier of Yukon – Dennis Fentie

== Events ==
=== January to March ===
- January 1 – Thirty cities across the province of Quebec are reconstituted as the result of a referendum held on June 20, 2004.
- January 10 – 29 seniors injured in a Toronto bus crash.
- January 23 – The 39th Canadian general election results in the Conservative Party of Canada holding the largest number of seats in Parliament, meaning Stephen Harper will become prime minister.
- February 1 – Justice John Gomery releases the final report of a Royal Commission investigating the federal sponsorship scandal.
- February 6 – Stephen Harper is sworn in as the 22nd Prime Minister of Canada.
- February 11 – Rodney MacDonald wins the leadership of the Nova Scotia Progressive Conservative Party.
- February 24 – Rodney MacDonald is sworn in as the 32nd Premier of Nova Scotia.
- February 24 – Marshall Rothstein is nominated to the Supreme Court of Canada by Prime Minister Stephen Harper. Rothstein will be the first Supreme Court nominee to face an all-party committee hearing in Parliament before his appointment is confirmed.
- March 2 – The Supreme Court of Canada rules in favour of Gurbaj Singh Multani, saying that kirpan can be worn in Canadian schools.
- March 23 – A British-led multinational military operation involving American, British, Canadian and Iraqi forces results in the release of three Christian Peacemaker hostages held in Iraq for nearly four months; Briton Norman Kember and Canadians Harmeet Singh Sooden and James Loney.

=== April to June ===
- April 1 – Holman, Northwest Territories, is renamed to Ulukhaktok
- April 16 – Hunter Jim Martell kills a Grizzly-polar bear hybrid on Banks Island in the Northwest Territories.
- May 15 – The village of Embrun, Ontario has its 150th anniversary.
- May 16 – Canada 2006 Census day.
- May 29 – A labour dispute leads to a one-day shutdown of the Toronto Transit Commission, stranding commuters in Toronto, Ontario.
- May 31 – 100 millimeters of rain in a few hours caused landslides in and around the small town of La Tuque, in central Quebec, damaging roads and flooding houses. State emergency was decreed right away and people were evacuated.
- June 2 – Terrorism plot—more than 400 police officers raided homes in Toronto and Mississauga, Ontario, and arrest 15 people (10 men and five youths), part of a terrorist cell. All men were born in Canada and were reportedly planning to attack the Parliament in Ottawa, the Bank of Toronto, some military installations, kidnap deputies and try to behead the Prime Minister Stephen Harper.
- June 13 – The 2006 Nova Scotia general election is won by Rodney MacDonald's Conservatives.
- June 26 – Prime minister Stephen Harper apologizes on behalf of the Canadian government for the Chinese head tax.

=== July to September ===
- July 7 – Two police officers are shot and killed in Spiritwood, Saskatchewan.
- July 17 – A series of severe thunderstorms hits Ontario, causing the worst damage to the province's power grid since the Ice Storm of 1998 and killing two people. Some communities in the Sudbury, Manitoulin and Nipissing regions go without power for a week before it can be restored. See the Great Lakes-Atlantic Coast derecho.
- August 2 – The day after record-breaking heat in Ontario and Quebec and just two weeks following another series of powerful storms, severe thunderstorms hit a vast swath of Cottage country in central and eastern Ontario. Eight confirmed tornadoes touch down, the single largest one-day outbreak in the province since 1985. The two strongest tornadoes are rated F2, one near Bancroft and other a direct hit on the town of Combermere in Renfrew County. Close to 200,000 residents lose power in the storms and more than 20,000 remain without power for over one week after the event. Extensive property and forest damage results. Amazingly no fatalities result.
- August 9 – Journalist Barbara Kay publishes a controversial piece in the National Post, "The Rise of Quebecistan", which accuses several Quebec politicians of endorsing terrorism and antisemitism.
- August 13 – The XVI International AIDS Conference opens in Toronto. Prime Minister Stephen Harper is widely criticized in the media for declining to attend.
- August 26 – Elizabeth May is elected leader of the Green Party of Canada.
- September 13 – Two people are killed and nineteen injured in the 2006 Dawson College shooting in Montreal.
- September 16 – Jan Wong publishes a controversial piece in The Globe and Mail, "Get under the desk", alleging that Kimveer Gill, the Dawson College shooter, was motivated by linguistic and cultural alienation from Quebec society.
- September 17 – World Wrestling Entertainment holds its Unforgiven pay-per-view event from the Air Canada Centre in Toronto, Ontario.
- September 18 – The 2006 New Brunswick general election is won by Shawn Graham's Liberal Party.
- September 30 – A highway overpass on Autoroute 19 in Laval collapses, killing five people and injuring six others.

=== October to December ===
- October 2 – Elaine Campione murders her two daughters in Barrie, Ontario by drowning them in a bathtub. Her crimes are motivated by revenge and the desire to stop her ex-husband gaining custody of the children, with Campione filming a video before and after the killings.
- October 3 – Shawn Graham becomes premier of New Brunswick, replacing Bernard Lord.
- October 4 – The Turner Review and Investigation is released. Prompted by the murder of Zachary Turner, the report concluded that the infant's death was preventable and that Newfoundland and Labrador's social services system did not adequately act to protect him from his mother.
- October 18 – MP Garth Turner is suspended from the Conservative caucus for criticizing Prime Minister Stephen Harper in his online blog.
- October 19 – Environment Minister Rona Ambrose introduces the controversial Clean Air Act, which is criticized by environmentalists and Opposition politicians for offering virtually no substantive action on climate change until at least 2011. During debate on the act, several Opposition politicians allege that they hear External Affairs Minister Peter MacKay refer to Liberal MP Belinda Stronach as a dog.
- October 20 – The Canadian Radio-television and Telecommunications Commission approves the sale of controversial Quebec City radio station CHOI-FM to RNC Media.
- October 23 – Inco Limited shareholders accept a takeover offer by Brazilian mining corporation Companhia Vale do Rio Doce.
- October 25 – Krista and Tatiana Hogan, conjoined twins, are born in Vancouver.
- November 13 – the 2006 Ontario municipal elections take place
- November 25 – First round of balloting in the 2006 Progressive Conservative Association of Alberta leadership election. As no candidate achieved 50% of the votes, a runoff was held on December 2 between top three finishers Jim Dinning, Ted Morton and Ed Stelmach.
- November 27 – The House of Commons votes to recognise the Québécois ethnic group as a nation within Canada in an informal motion.
- November 27 – Byelections are held in the ridings of London North Centre and Repentigny; Glen Pearson retains London North Centre for the Liberals, and Raymond Gravel retains Repentigny for the Bloc Québécois.
- December 2 – 2006 Liberal Party of Canada leadership election was held. Liberal delegates select Stéphane Dion as their new leader. Also the second round of balloting in the 2006 Progressive Conservative Association of Alberta leadership election selects Ed Stelmach as their new leader.
- December 14 – Ed Stelmach is sworn in as Premier of Alberta.
- December 8 - Stephen Harper announces the Canada's Chemical Management Plan; a program made up of various initiatives that focus on monitoring, research, assessment, regulation, and enforcement of chemicals.

=== Full date unknown ===
- The Caledonia land dispute escalates when the Ontario Provincial Police move in to remove the protesters but are stopped.
- Falconbridge Ltd. is acquired by Swiss mining company Xstrata.
- Rogers Wireless to begin deployment of Canada's first 3G Wireless Network.

== Arts and literature ==
=== New music ===
- Susan Aglukark, I Will Return
- April Wine, Roughly Speaking
- Eva Avila, Somewhere Else
- Delerium, Nuages du Monde
- Nelly Furtado, Loose
- Pierre Lapointe, La Forêt des Mal-Aimés
- Antoine Gratton, Il était une fois dans l'est
- Malajube, Trompe-l'oeil
- Loreena McKennitt, An Ancient Muse
- Richard Séguin, Lettres ouvertes
- Billy Talent, Billy Talent II
- Tragically Hip, World Container
- Chantal Kreviazuk, Ghost Stories

=== New books ===
- Gordon Stewart Anderson, The Toronto You Are Leaving
- Margaret Atwood, Moral Disorder
- Peter Behrens, The Law of Dreams
- Douglas Coupland, jPod
- Barbara Fradkin, Honour Among Men
- Rawi Hage, De Niro's Game
- Anosh Irani, The Song of Kahunsha
- Alice Munro, The View from Castle Rock
- Heather O'Neill, Lullabies for Little Criminals

=== Awards ===
- April 2 – Juno Awards of 2006
- June 11 – Canadian musical, The Drowsy Chaperone, wins five Tony Awards
- September 2–3 – Inaugural Osheaga Festival held in Montreal.
- November 21 – 2006 Governor General's Awards.
- David Foster, musical producer, is appointed to the Order of Canada
- Steve Smith, comedian, is appointed to the Order of Canada
- Judith Thompson, playwright, is appointed to the Order of Canada
- Ranee Lee, musician, is appointed to the Order of Canada
- Chantal duPont, video artist, wins the 2005 Bell Canada Award in Video Art
- Sylvia Legris's Nerve Squall is named winner of the Canadian Griffin Poetry Prize
- Scotiabank Giller Prize – Vincent Lam, Bloodletting and Miraculous Cures

=== Film ===
- January 20 – Karla, the controversial movie about the murders of two Canadian teens, Leslie Mahaffy and Kristen French, is released in Canada.
- August 11 – Bon Cop, Bad Cop, movie dark comedy-thriller buddy cop film about an Ontarian and a Québécois police officer who reluctantly join forces. The dialogue is a mixture of English and French and is claimed to be Canada's first bilingual feature film.
- September 7 – The Journals of Knud Rasmussen
- October 11 – Media reports announce that Bon Cop, Bad Cop has beaten Porky's to become the top-grossing Canadian film of all time in domestic box office; these are later disputed as not having taken inflation into account.
- C.R.A.Z.Y. is named best picture at the 26th Genie Awards.

== Sport ==
- January 6 – The Canadian Junior Hockey Team wins its 12th gold medal in the 2006 World Junior Hockey Championship
- January 8 – Kyle Nissen, Jeff Bean, Warren Shouldice and Ryan Blais finish first, second, third, and fourth in men's Freestyle Grand Prix at the World Cup Aerials.
- January 9–15 – Canadian Figure Skating Championships
  - Men's medalists – Jeffrey Buttle, Gold; Emanuel Sandhu, Silver; Shawn Sawyer, Bronze.
  - Women's medalists – Joannie Rochette, Gold; Mira Leung, Silver; Lesley Hawker, Bronze.
  - Pairs medalists – Valérie Marcoux / Craig Buntin, Gold; Jessica Dubé / Bryce Davison, Silver; Utako Wakamatsu / Jean-Sébastien Fecteau, Bronze.
  - Dance – Marie-France Dubreuil / Patrice Lauzon, Gold; Megan Wing / Aaron Lowe, Silver; Tessa Virtue / Scott Moir, Bronze.
- January 24 – Mario Lemieux announces his second retirement.
- Winter Olympic Games held in Turin, Italy:
  - February 11 – Jennifer Heil wins gold in freestyle skiing, women's moguls
  - February 12 – Cindy Klassen wins bronze in ladies' 3000 m speed skating
  - February 14 – Sara Renner and Beckie Scott win silver medals in ladies' team sprint in cross-country skiing
  - February 15 – Anouk Leblanc-Boucher wins bronze in the Ladies' 500 m in short track speed skating.
  - February 16 – Jeffrey Buttle wins bronze medal for men's figure skating solid free skate.
  - February 16 – Canada's men's speed skating team wins silver for men's team pursuit in speed skating
  - February 16 – Canada's women's speed skating team wins silver for women's team pursuit in speed skating
  - February 16 – Mellisa Hollingsworth-Richards wins bronze in women's skeleton.
  - February 17 – Duff Gibson and Jeff Pain win gold and silver respectively in men's skeleton.
  - February 17 – Dominique Maltais wins bronze in ladies' snowboard cross.
  - February 17 – Jeff Pain wins silver in men's skeleton.
  - February 19 – Pierre Lueders and Lascelles Brown win silver for two:man competition in bobsleigh.
  - February 19 – Cindy Klassen wins silver in the ladies' 1000 m for speed skating.
  - February 20 – The Canadian women's ice hockey team win gold.
  - February 22 – Kristina Groves wins silver in the women's 1500 m in speed skating.
  - February 22 – Canada's women's speed skating team wins silver for women's 3000 m relay in short track speed skating
  - February 22 – Cindy Klassen wins gold in the Ladies 1500 m in speed skating.
  - February 22 – Chandra Crawford wins gold in the Ladies Sprint for cross-country skiing.
  - February 23 – The Canadian women's curling team wins bronze by beating Norway 11–5.
  - February 24 – The Canadian men's curling team beats Finland 10:4 and wins gold.
  - February 25 – Clara Hughes wins gold in the Ladies 5000 m in speed skating.
  - February 25 – François-Louis Tremblay wins a silver medal in short track speed skating's men's 500 m.
  - February 25 – The men's speed skating team wins silver in short track speed skating's men's 5000 m relay.
  - February 25 – Cindy Klassen wins bronze in the Ladies 5000 m in speed skating, giving her a total of 5 medals making her the best Canadian Olympian ever.
- February 12 - Toronto's Christian Cage (Jay Reso) won his First NWA World Heavyweight Championship by defeating Jeff Jarrett at the TNA Impact! Zone in Orlando for Total Nonstop Action's Against All Odds 2006
- May 7 – National Basketball Association: Canadian Steve Nash is named NBA MVP for the 2nd year in a row.
- May 28 - Quebec Remparts won their Second Memorial Cup by defeating the Moncton Wildcats 6 to 2. The Tournament was played at the Moncton Coliseum
- June 19 - Carolina Hurricanes won their First Stanley Cup by defeating the Edmonton Oilers 4 game to 3. Sherwood Park, Alberta's Cam Ward is awarded the Conn Smythe Trophy
- November 18 - Georges St-Pierre becomes First Canadian UFC Welterweight Champion by defeating Matt Hughes at UFC 65
- November 19 – BC Lions won their Fifth Grey Cup by defeating the Montreal Alouettes 25 to 14 in the 94th Grey Cup played at the Canad Inns Stadium in Winnipeg. Vancouver's Paul McCallum was awarded the game's Most Valuable Canadian
- November 25 - Laval Rouge et Or won their Vanier Cup by defeating the Saskatchewan Huskies 13 to 8 in the 42nd Vanier Cup played at Griffiths Stadium

== Births ==
- July 17 – Lilly Bartlam, child actress, singer and dancer
- October 5 - Jacob Tremblay, actor
- October 25 – Krista and Tatiana Hogan, conjoined twins
- December 6 - Millie Davis, actress

== Deaths ==
=== January to June ===
- January 4 – Irving Layton, poet (born 1912)
- January 26 – Len Carlson, actor and voice actor (born 1937)
- February 24 – John Martin, broadcaster (born 1947)
- February 25 – Margaret Gibson, novelist and short story writer (born 1948)
- March 11 – Bernie Geoffrion, ice hockey player (born 1931)
- April 16 – Harold Horwood, novelist and non-fiction writer (born 1923)
- April 23 – Steve Stavro, Macedonian-Canadian businessman and philanthropist (born 1927)
- April 25 – Jane Jacobs, urbanist, writer and activist (born 1916)
- May 6 – Lorne Saxberg, television journalist and news anchor (born 1958)
- May 10 – A. M. Rosenthal, columnist and newspaper editor (born 1922)
- June 12 – Kenneth Thomson, 2nd Baron Thomson of Fleet, businessman and art collector (born 1923)

=== July to September ===
- August 9 – Melissa Hayden, ballerina (born 1923)
- August 23 – Maynard Ferguson, jazz trumpet player and bandleader (born 1928)
- August 24
  - Léopold Simoneau, lyric tenor (born 1916)
  - John Weinzweig, composer (born 1913)
- August 28 – Benoît Sauvageau, politician (born 1963)
- September 8 – Patricia Rideout-Rosenberg, contralto and music educator (born 1931)
- September 16 – Floyd Curry, ice hockey player (born 1925)
- September 29 – Louis-Albert Vachon, educator and Cardinal of the Roman Catholic Church (born 1912)

=== October to December ===
- October 16 – Lister Sinclair, broadcaster, playwright and polymath (born 1921)
- November 4 – Frank Arthur Calder, politician, first Status Indian to be elected to any legislature in Canada (born 1915)
- November 7 –
  - Jackie Parker, American-born football player
  - George Tutunjian, Syria–born singer (born 1930)
- November 14 – Sydney Banks, broadcaster and producer (born 1917)
- November 22 – John Allan Cameron, folk singer (born 1938)

== See also ==
- 2006 in Canadian television
- List of Canadian films of 2006
