= Swords of Righteousness Brigade =

Terrorist group

The Swords of Righteousness Brigade (Arabic: سرايا سيوف الحق, sometimes translated as the Swords of Truth Brigade) is a group which kidnapped four Western peace activists from Christian Peacemaker Teams (CPT), in Iraq on 26 November 2005, murdered one, Tom Fox, and held the remaining three hostages until March 22, 2006, when coalition forces raided the place where the hostages were held, known as the Christian Peacemaker hostage crisis.

The group was unknown prior to this kidnapping. However, the U.S.-based SITE Institute, a terrorism research organization, said that it had found ties between the Swords of Righteousness Brigade and the Islamic Army in Iraq.

== Hostage crisis ==
In 2006, the CPT activists were freed, except for Tom Fox, an American Quaker, who was killed by the hostage takers. Along with Tom Fox, two Canadians, James Loney and Harmeet Singh Sooden, and a Briton, Norman Kember were also kidnapped. Their release reportedly involved the Canadian elite forces JTF-2, British SAS, and American Special Forces operatives.

== See also ==
- 2005–2006 Christian Peacemaker hostage crisis
