= Peace makers =

Peacemakers are individuals and organizations involved in peacemaking, often in countries affected by war, violent conflict, and political instability. They engage in processes such as negotiation, mediation, conciliation, and arbitration—drawing on international law and norms.

== Peacemaking ==
The objective is to move a violent conflict into non-violent dialogue, where differences are settled through conflict transformation processes or through the work of representative political institutions.

Peacemaking can occur at different levels, sometimes referred to as tracks. "High level" (governmental and international) peacemaking, involving direct talks between the leaders of conflicting parties, is sometimes thus referred to as Track 1. Tracks 2 and 3 are said to involve dialogue at lower levels—often unofficially between groups, parties, and stakeholders to a violent conflict—as well as efforts to avoid violence by addressing its causes and deleterious results. Peacemakers may be active in all three tracks, or in what is sometimes called multi-track diplomacy.

== Selected peacemaking organizations ==
Selected list of prominent inter-governmental and non-governmental peacemaking organizations:

- Centre for Conflict Resolution (South Africa)
- Centre for Humanitarian Dialogue (Switzerland)
- Center for Nonviolent Communication (international)
- Christian Peacemaker Teams (roots in North America)
- Community of Sant'Egidio (Italy)
- Crisis Management Initiative (Finland)
- Intergovernmental Authority on Development (Djibouti)
- International Alert (United Kingdom)
- Initiatives of Change
- Organization of African Unity (Ethiopia)
- Responding to Conflict (United Kingdom)
- American Friends Service Committee, an arm of the Quakers
- Quaker Peace & Social Witness (QPSW) the corresponding Quaker department in Britain
- John Woolman College of Active Peace
- Reverend Sun Myung Moon of Universal Peace Federation
- Student Peacemakers
- Search for Common Ground (United States)
- swisspeace (Switzerland)
- The United Nations
- Borderless World Foundation

== Famous peacemakers ==
Throughout history there have been many leaders, negotiators, and diplomats who have acted as peacemakers in various conflicts. One such diplomat who negotiated numerous peace settlements across the Middle East during the early 1970s between Israel and its neighbours was Henry Kissinger.

== See also ==
- Citizen diplomacy
- Diplomacy
- Diplomat
- List of peace activists
- Peaceworker
- Public diplomacy
