= 2004 Nepal riots =

Series of riots in Nepal

- Date: 31 August 2004
- Location: Various places in Nepal
- Caused by: Nepal hostage crisis
- Methods: Rioting, looting, arson, assault
- Result: Mosques, homes, vehicles destroyed; National day of mourning observed

Casualties
- Death: At least 2 people

The 2004 Nepal riots were a series of riots between 31 August to 6 September 2004. Thousands of people rioted in cities and towns across Nepal, which saw looting, arson, as well as imposed curfew and the deaths of two people.

The protests started in Kathmandu, Nepal, following the Nepal hostage crisis. On 19 August 2004, twelve Nepalis were kidnapped in Iraq by Jamaat Ansar al-Sunna, and on 31 August, it was confirmed that the twelve Nepalis were murdered. Several violent clashes with police followed the crisis, along with vandalism of Kantipur Publications, Kantipur Television, Space Time Network, and Channel Nepal. The Nepal Association of Foreign Employment Agencies was reported to have lost about billions of Nepali Rupees (NPR), and various companies also lost about 750 million NPR in damages.

== Background ==
On 19 August 2004, the Jamaat Ansar al-Sunna website posted that they had taken twelve Nepalis hostage in Iraq and the group did not mention any demands nor gave any schedule for negotiations. The next day, the website showed a video of the Nepalis begging for their lives and they blamed, Pralhad Giri of Moonlight Consultants, for their abduction; the media was aired by various Nepali channels. On 23 August, the Government of Nepal made a plead via the Al Jazeera television channel, however, Nepali diplomats were unable to contact the kidnappers. The Nepali government also wrote to the Iraqi government, nevertheless, on 31 August at 6 pm, television channels broadcast pictures of the dead bodies of 12 Nepalis. This was later confirmed by the Qatari Government.

== Riots ==
The first demonstrations began shortly after television channels broadcast pictures of the dead bodies. At 6 pm, 20 people showed up at Maitidevi, Kathmandu, and they started to knock down signs of "labour recruitment agencies". Later at Ghanta Ghar, the protester threw rocks at a mosque, later the rioters grew more than 150 people.

On 1 September, rioters appeared in various areas including, Kathmandu, and Lalitpur. The same day at 7:30 am, about 100 people shouted a rallying cry against "Islamic terrorists" and threw rocks at a mosque near Ghanta Ghar, and some protesters climbed to the roof, but, deployed police force took control of the place. The rioters also targeted Kantipur Publications, Kantipur Television, Space Time Network, and Channel Nepal; their employees were harassed, attacked by rocks, and their vehicles were burned. Jame Masjid in Kathmandu was tried to set on fire however this was intervened by the police. More than hundreds of copies of the Koran, an Islamic holy book, were "thrown on to the street and burnt". International airlines from Islamic countries were also vandalised, including Qatar Airways, Saudia, Kuwait Airways, and Pakistan International Airlines.

At noon, the government announced it would impose a curfew around the Ring Road, Butwal, and Birtamod from 2:00 pm. At 1 pm, the protestors clash with the security guards near the Egyptian Embassy, Pulchok, and one is killed and three injured after they open fire. Half an hour later, near Ratna Park, three people were injured and one later dies at the hospital. The riots cool down after the curfew was deployed at 2 pm. It was estimated that there were more than 20,000 rioters on 1 September. Areas outside of the capital saw huge protests including in Birtamod, and Butwal.

On 2 September, Home Ministry reported that the situation was under control. On 4 September, the curfew was eased and many people were seen outside shopping for food and essential goods. The curfew was officially ended on Monday, 6 September.

== Effects ==
The Nepal Association of Foreign Employment Agencies was criticised and vandalized by rioters for failing to "protect hundreds of manpower agencies during the rampage". It was estimated that vandalism cost them billions of Nepali rupees as the protesters destroyed more than 300,000 passports "deposited with manpower agencies". The company told the government that they would not send anyone aboard for work until the government provides them with compensation and guaranteed the security of its employees. International airlines including Qatar Airways, Pakistan International Airlines, and Air Sahara stopped their flights to Kathmandu due to riots. Nepali Times estimated that various companies lost 750 million Nepalese rupees (NPR) in damages.

== Reactions ==
King Gyanendra and Queen Komal expressed their "condolences to the family and relatives of the people killed by Iraqi militants". It was reported that they were "shocked and grieved" by the cruel acts made by Jamaat Ansar al-Sunna. On 1 September, Prime Minister Sher Bahadur Deuba gave a nationwide speech on Radio Nepal and he called for "restraint". Deuba stated he would also provide 1 million Nepalese rupees to victims' family, and proclaimed 2 September to be a national day of mourning.

It was also condemned by Indian Prime Minister: Manmohan Singh, United States Secretary of State: Colin Powell, Minister of External Affairs: Natwar Singh, Jack Straw, Pope John Paul II, governments of Bangladesh and Japan. The Kathmandu Post called the militants "terrorists who have camouflaged themselves in the masks of Islam".

== See also ==
- Foreign hostages in Iraq
