= Christian Peacemaker hostage crisis =

Hostage situation involving Christian Peacemaker workers in Iraq

The Christian Peacemaker hostage crisis involved four human rights workers of Christian Peacemaker Teams (CPT) who were held hostage in Iraq from November 26, 2005 by the Swords of Righteousness Brigade. One hostage, Tom Fox, was killed, and the remaining three freed in a military operation on March 23, 2006.

== Capture ==
On 26 November 2005, masked gunman stopped a car carrying 4 members of the CPT and abducted them; the abduction took place in the university area of Baghdad – an area that had been a scene of trouble since US Marines had arrived in the area, with American troops fighting battles with Fedayeen lasting days.

The four CPTs had planned to visit the Muslim Clerics Association, an influential group of Sunni religious leaders formed in 2003 after the collapse of the former regime. They were about 100 metres from the entrance to the mosque where the meeting was to take place when they were abducted. Their driver and translator were not taken.

The hostages were:

- Tom Fox, 54, of Clear Brook, Virginia, U.S., a leader of youth programs at Langley Hill Friends Meeting and Baltimore Yearly Meeting.
- Norman Kember, 74, of Pinner, London, U.K., a retired professor of medical physics.
- James Loney, 41, of Sault Ste. Marie, Ontario, Canada, program coordinator for CPT Canada.
- Harmeet Singh Sooden, 32, a Canadian electrical engineer studying in New Zealand.

=== The Christian Peacemaker Teams in Iraq ===
The hostages were members of CPT Iraq project, which began working in 2002, before the 2003 invasion of Iraq. Their goal is to document and publicize abuses of human rights occurring in the country, especially in relation to detainees, and to advocate for peaceful solutions to conflict.

During the crisis, the CPT Iraq team issued statements asking that the hostages be freed so they could continue their work.

A distinctive feature of this crisis was the victims' dedication to non-violence. CPT condemned the actions of the kidnappers, but maintained pacifist principles by refusing to call for any violent rescue effort. The kidnappings led to widespread sympathy and support, with calls for their release coming from diverse Muslim, Christian and secular groups in the West and Middle East. However, supporters of the Iraq War have criticized the team's presence in Iraq.

Throughout the crisis, CPT continued to campaign for Iraqi human rights, attempting to link support for their own workers to support for "thousands of Iraqis who are being detained illegally." CPT continues to hold that the "illegal occupation of Iraq...is the root cause of the insecurity that led to this kidnapping".

== Major developments ==
=== Kidnappers' demands ===
The kidnappers called themselves the Swords of Righteousness Brigade, and published a video shown worldwide on November 29, 2005 by Arab satellite channel Al Jazeera, in which they claimed the hostages were spies. They threatened to kill all hostages unless the US freed all Iraqi prisoners held in the US and Iraq by December 8, 2005. They later extended this deadline to December 10, 2005.

The complexity of the crisis deepened when Moazzam Begg and Abu Qatada, who was Osama bin Laden's so-called Ambassador in Europe joined in the appeals for Kember's release – but the appeals were ignored by the kidnappers.

More than a month passed until the next word from the kidnappers. On January 28, 2006, Al Jazeera broadcast a video showing the four hostages alive, dated January 21, 2006. The captors stated that the U.S. and Britain had one last chance to free all Iraqi prisoners or the hostages would be killed.

=== One hostage found murdered ===
On March 10, 2006 the body of Tom Fox was found near a train station in Baghdad, with gunshot wounds to the head and chest. The hands of the corpse were bound together. CNN reported that Iraqi policemen claimed Fox's body showed signs of torture. This report was widely repeated in other media outlets, although no further sources were named. This initial report has been challenged by CPT who claim that members of the group saw no evidence of torture upon viewing the body at a stateside funeral home and on examination of Fox's face and hands immediately after the body was recovered. CPT claims that two independent sources who examined the body more closely also found no evidence of torture. A member of the group added that he believed claims of torture "further demonize the other side." The results of an independent autopsy have not been made public.

Upon Fox's death the CPT released a statement of condolences, also asking that the world not "vilify or demonize others, no matter what they have done." They quoted Fox himself, saying, "We reject violence to punish anyone ... We forgive those who consider us their enemies."

=== Military action & recovery of surviving hostages ===
Following their kidnapping; Task Force Knight – the British special forces task force in Iraq – initiated Operation Lightwater; spearheaded by B squadron, 22nd SAS Regiment, the aim of which was to find and recover the hostages; a small team of JTF2 (the equivalent Canadian unit) and Canadian intelligence experts joined the task force for the operation; the United States provided technical intelligence to the operation. The Task Force prioritised Operation Lightwater over its new operations under JSOC against AQI and other terrorists and insurgents in Iraq. Operation Lightwater involved raiding houses and arresting suspects almost every day and night-with the main purpose of gathering intelligence; intelligence sources and materials seized in the raids revealed more about the terrorist group the kidnappers belonged to and when exploited (particularly of mobile phone sources), resulted in further raids. The total number of building raids amounted to 50, 44 of them being by British special forces including a total detained 47 people, only 4 of the raids were classed as 'dry holes' – places that were not productive of any useful information, the operation was instrumental in finding the hostages.

In the early hours of 23 March 2006, as part of Operation Lightwater, the SAS carried out Operation Ney 3: their target was a house in Mishahda, 20 miles northwest of Baghdad, they found two men they were looking for, whom revealed under pressure during interrogation/tactical questioning the location of the hostages in western Baghdad. Wary of an ambush, the SAS telephoned the kidnappers moments before the SAS assault on the house and were warned to the kidnappers to leave their location. At 0800, B squadron SAS stormed the house, finding the kidnappers had abandoned the building and freed the hostages, the hostages were ushered into a waiting Bradley IFV and the SAS exfilled in their Humvees.

The Times reported that the SAS were supported by 'Task Force Maroon', a support unit made up of British paratroopers and marines. Other sources include the Royal Canadian Mounted Police in the effort to free the hostages.

The three surviving hostages were in good medical condition. While captive, they had been allowed to exercise and Kember had received medication he needs.

It was reported that the CPT had not cooperated with the SAS officials who coordinated the operation to recover the hostages. CPT co-director Doug Pritchard stated that they did not want a "military raid" to occur and preferred to work with diplomats.

== Aftermath ==
=== Charges of ingratitude towards military personnel ===
According to an uncorroborated anecdote in Mark Urban's book, as they removed the hostages from the scene, the SAS soldiers found Kember hard to get any response from. One soldier allegedly said, "[He] was the most frustrating individual I have ever met in my life. From the point of lifting him he didn't address one word to us," adding that "the following day the Ambassador wheeled him over to our house [MSS Fernandez] and Kember finally said, if I remember his actual words, 'Thanks for saving my life'." In the UK, the story of Kember refusing to thank the SAS quickly gained currency.

CPT and the hostages were criticized for their reluctance to thank the troops who freed them. Following the release of the hostages, CPT's initial statement omitted any expression of gratitude toward the soldiers involved, but issued such a statement 12 hours later, with their gratitude that no shots were fired during the mission. General Sir Mike Jackson, Commander of the British Army, told British Channel 4 news he was "saddened that there does not seem to have been a note of gratitude [from Mr. Kember] for the soldiers who risked their lives to save those lives". However, he then qualified his statement by saying that a thank-you may have been issued, but if so he was not aware of it. Ekklesia, a think tank, later sought clarification from the UK Ministry of Defence (MOD) and was told on 27th March 2006: "information about the thanks had not filtered through to the MOD when General Sir Michael Jackson made his statement".

When James Loney and Norman Kember arrived in their respective home countries, they publicly thanked those who played a part in their release. Harmeet Sooden also issued a statement immediately upon arrival in New Zealand, thanking all those involved in securing their release.

=== Propaganda ===
Maj. Gen Rick Lynch, the briefer at Multi-National Force – Iraq Headquarters exploited Operation Lightwater success to counter stories from the previous months of Iraqi prisoner abuse, telling reporters that "the key point is it was intelligence-led. It was information provided by a detainee."

=== Refusal to testify ===
On December 8, 2006, the three ex-hostages held a press conference at St Ethelburga's Centre for Reconciliation, in London, to announce that they would not testify at the trial of their captors if there was a risk they will face execution. Under Iraqi law, kidnapping is currently punishable by the death penalty. Loney was quoted as saying, "We bear no malice towards them and have no wish for retribution."

Norman Kember said that if he did testify, it would likely be only to plea for clemency on behalf of their captors.

Years later, the kidnappers were arrested by the Iraqi police, but Kember still refused to testify.

== Books published on crisis ==
On March 23, 2007, one year after the release of the three hostages, Norman Kember published Hostage in Iraq. Published by Darton Longman and Todd, it told the story of his captivity and included previously unseen drawings and notes made by Norman Kember, who during his captivity invented games with his fellow captives.

On June 5, 2008, Christian Peacemaker Teams published a collection of essays by those involved in the crisis including Kember, Sooden and Loney. The book was initially self-published after two different religious publishing houses insisted on changes to a chapter written by Dan Hunt, Loney's same-sex partner. The book is now available from Cascadia Publishing House. It examines the events surrounding the captivity from multiple points of view, including CPT members who remained in Baghdad during the crisis; members working on other teams (Palestine, Colombia, the Chicago and Toronto offices); friends, supporters and family members of the hostages.

Knopf Canada published a memoir written by James Loney in the spring of 2011, titled Captivity: 118 Days in Iraq and the Struggle for a World Without War.

In Task Force Black: The Explosive True Story of the Secret Special Forces War in Iraq (2011), BBC journalist Mark Urban chronicles British and American special forces operations in post-invasion Iraq. The book briefly references the Christian Peacemaker Teams hostage crisis, describing it largely on the basis of unnamed sources.

== Timeline of the crisis ==
November 26
The hostages are abducted.
November 29
Al Jazeera broadcasts a video from "Swords of Righteousness Brigade" showing hostages and issuing demands.
December 3
The Iraq Islamic Party, the main Sunni political party in Iraq, called for the release of the hostages.
December 5
An online petition calling for the release of the hostages was signed by more than 13000 people, including Noam Chomsky and Arundhati Roy.
December 6
Another video was released, in which the hostages gave assurances that they were being well-treated. In the video, Sooden and Loney are shown unshackled and eating, while Fox and Kember appear handcuffed. Kember requests that Tony Blair withdraw all British troops from Iraq.
On the same day, Ehab Lotayef, a representative of the Canadian Islamic Congress, left Canada for Baghdad (he arrived in Iraq on December 9 and broadcast televised appeals to the kidnappers, stating that Christian Peacemakers had always been supportive of human rights for Arabs in Iraq and Palestine). As well, Tom Fox's daughter Katherine appeared on ABC's Nightline to plead for his release.
December 7
An additional plea for the hostages' release was made by the radical Muslim cleric Abu Qatada, from a British jail.
Later the same day, another video was released by the kidnappers, in which they extended the deadline for their demands to Saturday, December 10. This video featured only Fox and Kember, clad in orange jumpsuits reminiscent of those worn by detainees in photos from Abu Ghraib and Guantanamo Bay. Some commentators, such as BBC correspondent Caroline Hawley, speculated that Loney and Sooden may have been treated differently than Fox and Kember, as the former two are both Canadians, and Canada did not support the 2003 invasion of Iraq. This speculation was based on the apparent differences in the treatment of the hostages in the second video (in which only Fox and Kember are shackled) and the third (in which only Fox and Kember appear).
December 9
Former Guantanamo Bay detainee Moazzam Begg called for the hostages' release, stating that the orange boiler suits worn by the hostages reminded him of his own imprisonment. Terry Waite also pleaded for Kember's release, however he added that he disputed the Christian Peacemakers' tactic of going into a "highly polarised" situation in Iraq. The same day, a plea was made by Mohammed Mahdi Akef, president of the Egyptian Muslim Brotherhood.
December 10
The second deadline passed on the afternoon of December 10, with no information from the Brigade about the status of the hostages. Fox's daughter issued a statement saying that she and her father believe the Iraqi people have legitimate grievances about the U.S. occupation, but "these grievances, however, will not be resolved by taking my father's life." As well, prominent American antiwar activist Cindy Sheehan called for the hostages' release in a rally in London.
December 12
Cardinal Cormac Murphy-O'Connor sent his regards and a message of support to a vigil being held in Trafalgar Square, saying that he too prayed for their release, and closed stating "I plead with their captors to have mercy, as God is merciful, and to release them."
December 16
The Toronto Star reported that a confidential source has stated that an unnamed Iraqi hostage negotiator who had allegedly made contact with the kidnappers had himself been abducted. Later that day, Ekklesia reported these claims were unfounded, and that there was no such negotiator.
December 25
The families of the hostages placed advertisements in many Iraqi newspapers, repeating previous pleas by prominent Muslims for their release.
January 4
Christian Peacemaker Teams announced that some of its members would hold a public Epiphany fast in Lafayette Park outside the White House from January 6 to January 9, or until they were granted a meeting with President Bush.
January 7
Al Jazeera ran an interview with a friend of Tom Fox, using a headline emphasising the situation as ongoing.
January 28
Al Jazeera broadcast a video dated January 21, showing the four hostages. The video appeared with a statement from the captors offering US authorities a "last chance" to "release all Iraqi prisoners in return of freeing the hostages otherwise their fate will be death."
February 20
Newly appointed Canadian foreign-affairs minister Peter MacKay drew criticism after telling reporters he is confident the hostages will be released. He later apologized to the families of the hostages for his speculation, saying he had no new information.
March 7
Al Jazeera broadcast a new video, dated to 28 February. It showed Kember, Loney, and Sooden talking into the camera, but it had no sound and contains no demands by the kidnappers. All three were shown alert and apparently well; Tom Fox was not shown. Rebecca Johnson, spokeswoman for CPT, stated that public speculation on the reasons for Fox's absence was "unhelpful".
March 10
The U.S. State Department announced that the body of Tom Fox was found in Iraq.
March 23
News outlets reported at the time that the three remaining hostages are freed in a British-led operation by a multinational force consisting of American and British coalition forces as well as Iraqi forces, the Royal Canadian Mounted Police, and possibly Canadian military personnel. The identity and extent of the Canadian military contribution and the nature of its participation, if any, are unknown. There were unconfirmed reports and speculation that elements of the Canadian special-operations unit Joint Task Force 2 were involved. It has been confirmed that the operation was led by SAS Troopers Reports indicate that no kidnappers were present at the house where the hostages were found and no shots were fired during the operation.
March 27
Upon his return to New Zealand, Harmeet Sooden was warned by Prime Minister Helen Clark not to go back to Iraq saying; "The New Zealand Government constantly says to Kiwis 'Don't go there. You are walking into a war zone. It is a very, very dangerous place and New Zealand is not represented in Iraq in any shape or form and we are not in a position to help". There was also controversy about "chequebook journalism" on the part of state-owned TVNZ, which covered the travel costs for Sooden's family to accompany Sooden home from the UAE in exchange for their exclusive story. Sooden himself rejected the arrangement.
December 8
The three ex-hostages announced their disinclination to testify against their former captors if there was a chance the kidnappers might face the death penalty.

== See also ==
- Foreign hostages in Iraq
- Captive, documentary series in which the Christian Peacemaker hostage crisis was featured.
