= Paul Taggart =

American photographer and writer (born 1980)

- Born: 1980 (age 45–46); United States
- Occupations: Photographer, writer

Paul Taggart (born 1980) is an American photographer and writer best known for his photographs from the Middle East and Africa.

== Career ==
Taggart was one of the few unembedded western journalists to cover the month-long battle and siege of Najaf, Iraq in 2004 between the Mahdi Militia and the coalition forces. Other prominent news stories Taggart has covered have been Benazir Bhutto's return to Pakistan in 2007 and the dual bombing of her convoy after leaving the airport, the Tsunami in Banda Aceh, the 2005 famine in Niger, the 2005 elections in Liberia, the 2006 war in Lebanon, and the 3-month-long siege of the Nahr al-Bared refugee camp in northern Lebanon in the summer of 2007.

Taggart's work has appeared in Newsweek, The New York Times, U.S. News & World Report, The Boston Globe, National Geographic Adventure, and The Times of London.

== Kidnapping ==
In October 2004, Taggart was kidnapped while working in Sadr City outside of Baghdad, Iraq, and held hostage for three days before being released as a result of pleas from Muqtada Al Sadr.

== See also ==
- List of kidnappings

== Sources ==
- Article title
- Official Website
- https://web.archive.org/web/20080614042632/http://www.cpj.org/Briefings/2003/gulf03/iraq_abducted.html
- https://www.digitaljournalist.org/issue0711/between-the-airport-and-the-mausoleum.html
- https://digitaljournalist.org/issue0602/dis_taggart.html
- https://www.digitaljournalist.org/issue0712/kneel-before-the-fire.html
- https://www.digitaljournalist.org/issue0608/the-sky-is-falling.html
- Paul Taggart at IMDb
- U.S. Raids in 2 Sunni Cities Anger Clerics and Residents
