= Joint Task Force 2 =

Canadian Armed Forces' elite Tier 1 special operations unit

Coordinates: 45°07′49″N 75°56′46″W

- Deuxième Force opérationnelle interarmées
- Founded: 1 April 1993
- Country: Canada
- Type: Special operations force
- Role: Special operations; Counterterrorism
- Size: Classified
- Part of: Canadian Special Operations Forces Command
- Garrison/HQ: Dwyer Hill, Ottawa, Ontario
- Engagements: Operation Assurance – Rwanda; Yugoslav Wars • NATO intervention in Bosnia • Kosovo War; 1999 East Timorese crisis; War on terror; • War in Afghanistan; • Christian Peacemaker hostage crisis; • Operation Impact; 2004 Haitian coup d'état; Libyan Civil War; • Operation Mobile
- Decorations: Presidential Unit Citation
- Battle honours: JTF 2 does not carry individual battle honours, but instead is granted the motto ubique (Latin for 'everywhere')

Commanders
- Notable commanders: LGen Michael Rouleau, OMM, MSC, CD; LCol Ray Romses

Insignia
- Headdress: Tan beret

Joint Task Force 2 (JTF 2) is a special operations force of the Canadian Armed Forces under the operational control of CANSOFCOM. The unit's missions primarily involve counterterrorism, hostage rescue, direct action, and special reconnaissance.

The unit was created to fill the counter terrorism role after the disbandment of the Special Emergency Response Team (SERT). JTF 2 is often paired with, and typically compared to, American 1st SFOD-D (CAG/Delta Force) and DEVGRU (SEAL Team 6), and the British Special Air Service.

Most information concerning JTF 2 is classified and is not usually commented on by the Canadian Armed Forces or the Canadian government.

== History ==
In 1992, Deputy Minister of Defence Robert Fowler announced he was recommending to Governor General Ray Hnatyshyn that he disband the Royal Canadian Mounted Police's Special Emergency Response Team (SERT) and create a new military counter-terrorism group. The decision was made largely because the Canadian Forces offered a greater pool of recruits for the program than civilian police forces, and it stemmed the public uproar about police being taught to use primarily lethal means.

In early 1993, the unit was activated with just over 100 members, primarily drawn from the Canadian Airborne Regiment and Princess Patricia's Canadian Light Infantry. They were given the SERT facility on Dwyer Hill Road near Ottawa as their own base of operations, and permanently parked a Greyhound bus and a DC-9 aircraft on the grounds for use in training.

JTF 2's team of assaulters specialize in counterterrorism, direct action raids, hostage rescue, maritime special operations, special protection, and special reconnaissance often employed in complex, classified and dangerous missions against high-value targets backed up by specialized teams of supporting personnel.

Its first scheduled action was Operation Campus, the protection of highways and water treatment plants around the Oka reserve while a police force tried to "crack down on smuggling" on the native reserve, immediately following the Oka crisis. However two daily newspapers in Quebec revealed the operation just days before it was to go into action, and it was cancelled. The federal budget of December 2001 allocated approximately $120 million over six years to expand unit capabilities and double its size to an estimated 600 personnel, as part of the overall plan following the attacks of September 11, 2001.

On 21 December 2006, a Federal Court judge rejected a request to proceed with a court martial against an unnamed JTF 2 officer, accused of assaulting and mistreating a subordinate. Because court martial requests require that the accused be named, the judge suggested that they explore other avenues to proceed with the court martial.

JTF 2 has acknowledged the death of one member. Master Corporal Anthony Klumpenhouwer, 25, died on April 18, 2007, after falling off a communications tower in Kandahar, Afghanistan. In 2010, the investigation into Klumpenhouwer's death was completed, and revealed that he had been knocked unconscious by a surge of electricity.

On September 13, 2024, new buildings are undergoing construction at JTF 2's Dwyer Hill headquarters to modernize their facilities with older buildings being scheduled to be torn down, which is contracted to EllisDon Corporation. A bridge will be constructed to Franktown Road, which will only be used by special forces to transport their equipment. It is expected to be completed by 2027.

== Operations ==
=== Bosnia ===
JTF 2 forces were inserted into Bosnia, operating in two- to four-man teams hunting for Serbian snipers who were targeting UN forces at the sniper alley. They were scheduled to free approximately 55 hostages in Operation Freedom 55, but the mission was cancelled as the Bosnian Serbs released all the prisoners voluntarily.

=== Haiti ===
In 1996, JTF 2 deployed to Haiti to advise the security forces of President René Préval on methods to repel the revolutionary army, train local SWAT teams and raid weapons smugglers in Port-au-Prince.

According to the Canadian Broadcasting Corporation, JTF 2 was also in Haiti at the time that Haitian president Jean-Bertrand Aristide was ousted from power in 2004. They protected the Canadian embassy and secured the airport.

=== War on terror ===
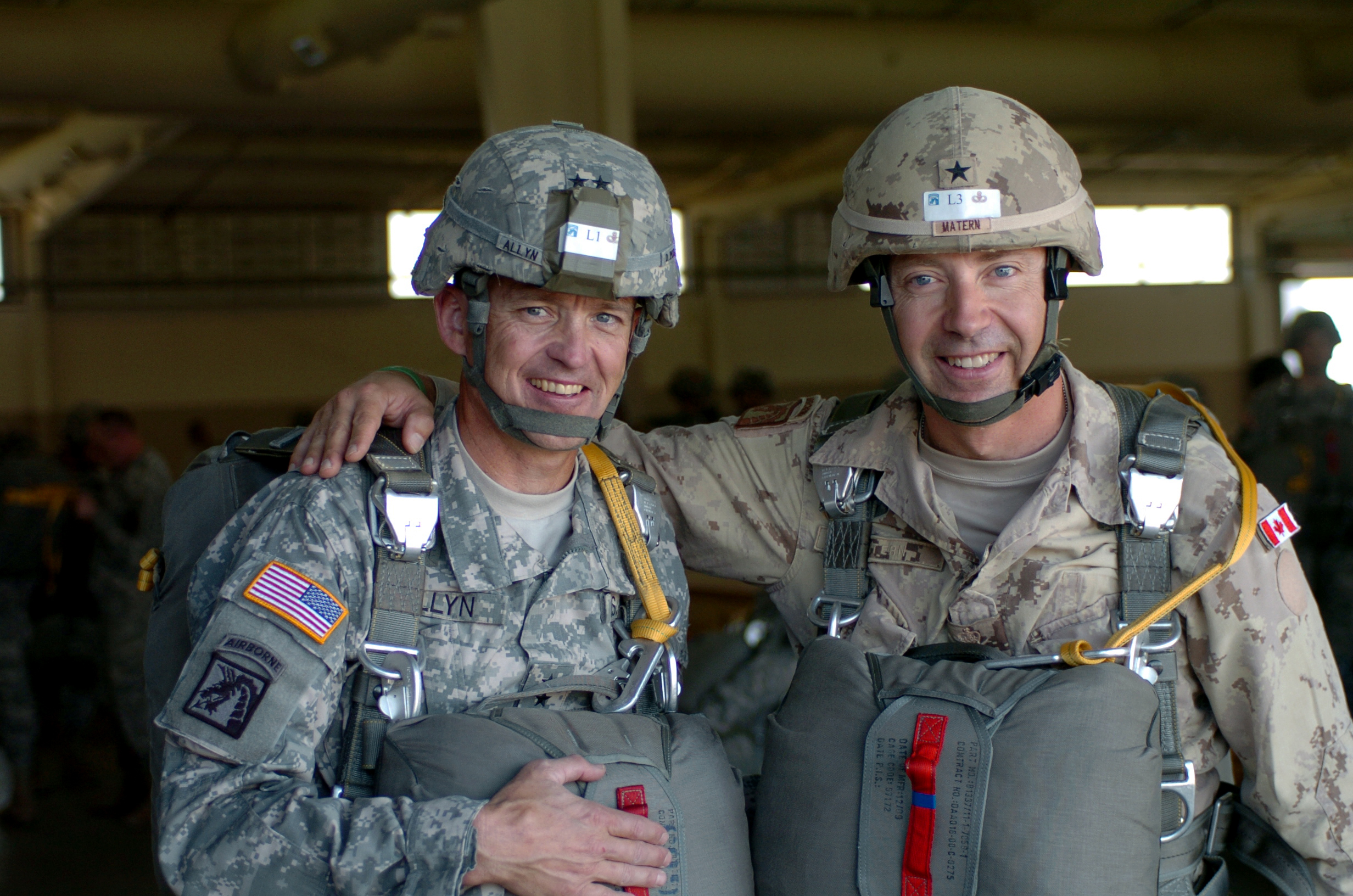
Brigadier-General Nicolas Matern (right, in 2010), former commander of Joint Task Force 2 and deputy commander of Canadian Special Operations Forces Command

In the aftermath of the September 11 attacks and the American declaration of a war on terror, approximately 40 JTF 2 soldiers were sent to southern Afghanistan in early December 2001 to be part of Task Force K-Bar, under the command of Captain Robert Harward. The Canadian public was not informed of the deployment. However, in Sean M. Maloney's book Enduring the Freedom, it was reported that JTF 2 was secretly deployed without Prime Minister Jean Chrétien's permission in early October 2001. Under Task Force K-Bar, JTF 2 worked extensively with the U.S. 3rd Special Forces Group; one of their first missions in Afghanistan was what Harward described as "the first Coalition direct action mission since the Second World War." The joint operation with a team of Green Berets targeting a Taliban command node almost ended in disaster when a Chinook carrying JTF 2 operators was forced to make a hard landing near the target site. While serving with Task Force K-Bar, Harward also stated that the JTF 2 team under his command was his first choice for any direct action. JTF 2 was based at the time in Kandahar Air Field.

Several months later, The Globe and Mail published an image on its front page showing operators in distinctive forest-green Canadian Forces combat uniforms delivering captured prisoners to the Americans. This prompted an outcry in Parliament as MPs were never informed these operations were underway. Vice Admiral Greg Maddison was called before the Standing Committee on Procedure and House Affairs to address claims that Minister of Defence Art Eggleton had purposely misled the public and the government, even failing to inform the Prime Minister that JTF 2 had been operating in Afghanistan. Segments of the Canadian media made much of the special forces handing over detainees, particularly those who may have been sent to Guantanamo Bay. In January 2002, JTF 2 deployed reconnaissance teams to the series of caves discovered in Zhawar Kili, just south of Tora Bora. Airstrikes hit the sites before SOF teams were inserted into the area. A platoon from SEAL Team 3, including several of their Desert Patrol Vehicles, accompanied by a German Kommando Spezialkräfte (KSK) element and a Norwegian SOF team, spent some nine days conducting extensive site exploitation, clearing an estimated 70 caves and 60 structures in the area, recovering a huge amount of both intelligence and munitions, but they did not encounter any al-Qaeda fighters. In March 2002, JTF 2 reconnaissance teams took part in Operation Anaconda; they also conducted close protection tasks and participated in numerous direct action missions, allegedly including the siege at Mirwais hospital in Kandahar, where a US Army Special Forces operational detachment-A (SFODA) killed a group of al-Qaeda terrorists hiding in a hospital ward; JTF 2 also carried out numerous operations with the New Zealand Special Air Service. JTF 2's first rotation was completed when they returned to Canada in May 2002, to be replaced by a second, shorter term, deployment until October 2002.

In 2004, an estimated 40 members of JTF 2 serving with Task Force K-Bar were awarded the Presidential Unit Citation by the U.S. government for service in Afghanistan. Very little is known on JTF 2 operations in Afghanistan, but during a conference the former Chief of Defence Staff, General Rick Hillier, stated that JTF 2 was in "high demand" and that they were considered to be "world class". He went on to say that the unit was providing direct support to the Afghan government and was targeting the Taliban leadership in southern Afghanistan. He stated that "trying to help neutralize those leaders is a key part of their role and that's what they will continue to do."

On 26 November 2005, members of the terrorist group Swords of Righteousness Brigade – a small offshoot of possibly Islamic Army in Iraq (IAI), Ansar al-Islam (AAI), Army of Islam, or a cover name for their abduction cells, or freelance cash criminal abductors – kidnapped four members (two Canadian, one British, and one American) of the Christian Peacemaker Teams in Baghdad, Iraq. In response, Task Force Knight — the British special forces task force in Iraq — initiated Operation Lightwater; spearheaded by B Squadron, 22nd Special Air Service Regiment (SAS), the aim of which was to find and recover the hostages; a small team of JTF 2 and Canadian intelligence experts joined the task force for the operation whilst the United States provided technical intelligence to the operation. Together the force carried out relentless raids across the city, building up a picture by exploiting intelligence in the search for the hostages. Eventually on 23 March 2006 the three remaining hostages were rescued by the SAS. The Pentagon and the British Foreign Office both commented on the instrumental role JTF 2 played in rescuing the British and Canadian Christian Peacemaker Team that were being held hostage in Iraq. Involvement of JTF 2 was not confirmed by Canadian officials.

There has been much speculation in the Canadian media on possible JTF 2 operational deployments. As of 2001, the unit had 297 members, but by the end of the year, with the war on terror becoming a reality, the federal government announced their intentions to increase it to 600 members within four years.

As of 2014, the unit was believed to be in Iraq as training personnel, under the Canadian Operation Impact which is part of Operation Inherent Resolve. The Canadian government has not denied or confirmed JTF 2's involvement.

In June 2017, it was reported that a JTF 2 sniper in Iraq had shot and killed an ISIL fighter from a distance of 3,540 metres (2.20 mi), setting a world record for the longest confirmed kill. The shot was taken from a high-rise building using a standard Canadian military issued McMillan Tac-50 rifle, a .50 caliber (12.7×99mm) anti-materiel rifle commonly used by snipers in an anti-personnel role. The Canadian Forces designation is the C15 Long-Range Sniper Weapon (LRSW).

=== Other actions ===
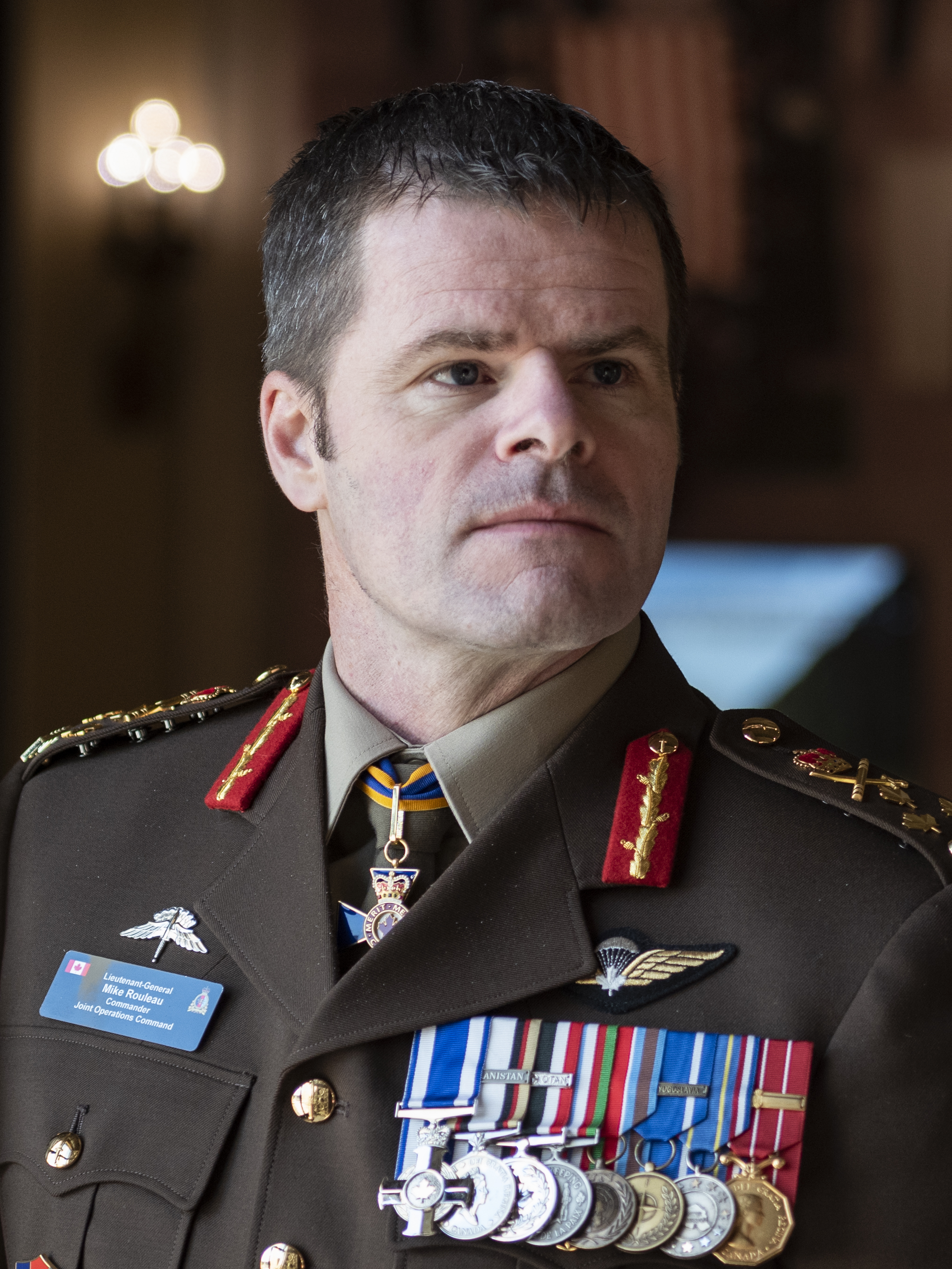
General Michael Rouleau in 2019

Vice-Admiral Dean McFadden also confirmed that JTF 2 would take a role in securing the 2010 Winter Olympics and 2010 Winter Paralympics.

JTF 2 has also acted as bodyguards to Canadians travelling abroad, notably accompanying Lieutenant-General Maurice Baril and Raymond Chrétien to Zaire in November 1996. When photographs provided to the media were revealed to show the faces of JTF 2 forces, they were redacted and reissued with the faces removed. In 1998, they accompanied General Roméo Dallaire to Tanzania where he was due to testify against a Rwandan Hutu official accused of complicity in the 1994 genocide. They similarly accompanied war crimes prosecutor Louise Arbour into Kosovo. In early November 2000, Conservative Defence Critic David Price stated that JTF 2 had been deployed to Kosovo, however, this was denied by Prime Minister Jean Chrétien and Defence Minister Art Eggleton.

The unit was believed to be operating with the Special Air Service and Special Boat Service in Operation Mobile, the Canadian operation in the 2011 Libyan civil war.

In August 2021, JTF 2 and CSOR operators were deployed to Afghanistan to evacuate staff from the Canadian Embassy in Kabul.

In May 2022, Prime Minister Justin Trudeau visited Ukraine to show solidarity and to witness the war for himself, alongside members of the cabinet. As part of the security detail, they were accompanied by members of JTF 2.

In October 2023, JTF 2 and other CANSOFCOM elements were deployed to Israel to help with security at the Canadian embassy. In March 2024, JTF 2 operators were deployed to Haiti to protect the Canadian Embassy and staff.

== Notable members ==
- Lieutenant-General Michael Rouleau CMM MSC CD – He served as the Vice Chief of the Defence Staff from July 2020 to June 2021. Previously, he commanded Canadian Special Operations Forces Command (CANSOFCOM) and Canadian Joint Operations Command.
- Brigadier-General Nicolas Matern – Former commander of JTF 2 and deputy commander of Canadian Special Operations Forces Command
- Master Corporal Devon Larratt – is a renowned professional arm wrestler, who served in Joint Task Force 2 for 16 years.
- Master Corporal Anthony Klumpenhouwer – A JTF 2 member who died in 2007 following a fall from a communications tower in Kandahar, Afghanistan, making him the only operator to die while in service during GWOT.
- "Levon Johnson" (pseudonym) – A warrant officer who completed multiple tours in Afghanistan and special operations worldwide. His story is related in Extraordinary Canadians: Stories from the Heart of Our Nation, a book by Peter Mansbridge and Mark Bulgutch.
- Dallas Alexander – He gained international recognition as a member of the sniper team responsible for the world's longest confirmed kill in military history at the time from a distance of 3,540 metres. Alexander claimed he was forced out of the military because of his unwillingness to be vaccinated and refusal to wear a mask during the COVID-19 pandemic.

== Equipment ==
Operators use a range of weapons including:

- SIG Sauer MCX
- Colt Canada series of rifles: C7, C8, and C8SFW
- SIG Sauer SIG 716 G2 designated marksman rifle
- Heckler & Koch MP5 (A2/A3/SD) submachine gun
- FN Herstal P90 personal defence weapon
- SIG Sauer P226 sidearm
- SIG Sauer P320 sidearm
- Remington Model 870 and Benelli M3 shotguns
- FN Minimi C9A2 light machine gun
- Accuracy International AWP, C14 Timberwolf, Heckler & Koch PSG1, M110 Semi-Automatic Sniper System, McMillan TAC-50 and Barrett M82 sniper rifles
- M203 grenade launcher, Heckler & Koch GMG automatic grenade launcher, and Heckler & Koch HK69A1 grenade launcher.
- Rafael Spike-LR anti-tank guided missile
- Saab Bofors Dynamics AT4 anti-tank weapon.
- Carl Gustaf 8.4cm recoilless rifle M4 version

JTF 2 uses the High Mobility Multipurpose Wheeled Vehicle (HMMWV) special operations version. The Next Generation Fighting Vehicle project intends to replace the HMMWV with 60 Joint Light Tactical Vehicles (JLTV) through a US Foreign Military Sale approved in August 2025. Additionally, in 2016, the DAGOR (Deployable Advanced Ground Off-road) vehicle by Polaris Defense was awarded the Ultra-Light Combat Vehicle (ULCV) contract to provide 78 vehicles to CANSOFCOM.

== See also ==
- Princess Patricia's Canadian Light Infantry – Canadian military unit
- Canadian Airborne Regiment
- Canadian Special Operations Regiment – Special operations forces unit of the Canadian Armed Forces
- Devil's Brigade – Joint U.S.-Canadian military unit in WWII
