= Harmeet Singh Sooden =

Canadian-New Zealand anti-war activist (born 1973)

- Born: 1973 (age 52–53); Zambia
- Education: McGill University
- Occupation: Engineer

Harmeet Singh Sooden (born 1973) is a Canadian-New Zealand anti-war activist who volunteered for the international NGO Christian Peacemaker Teams in Iraq. He was held captive in Baghdad with three others for almost four months until being freed by The British SAS on 23 March 2006.

Sooden was born and raised in Zambia. His parents are Sikhs from Kashmir. His great-grandfather fought for the British Indian Army in World War I and died in Basra in 1916 during the Mesopotamian Campaign. As an inspiration for peace work, he cites his grandfather who was a career soldier in the Indian Army. He says he was also motivated by the experiences of a friend who survived the World Trade Center attack on 11 September 2001, and the ordeal of Maher Arar, a university classmate who was subjected to extraordinary rendition and torture.

Sooden holds degrees in Computer Engineering from McGill University in Montréal, Canada and English literature from the University of Auckland in New Zealand. He was a member of the University of Auckland's chapter of Students for Justice in Palestine.

On 23 July 2006, Sooden did an extensive interview with journalist Sahar Ghumkhor, in which he discussed his reflections on his visits in Iraq before the kidnapping, his captivity, his release and the response of the media.

== Christian Peacemaker Teams hostage crisis ==
Christian Peacemaker Teams (CPT) is an international organisation set up to support teams of peace workers in conflict areas around the world. One aspect of CPT's work in Iraq during the US occupation was to collect and publicise evidence of detainee abuse. Investigative journalist, Seymour Hersh of The New Yorker magazine, who helped to expose the Abu Ghraib torture and prisoner abuse scandal in 2004, cited the organisation in his articles. In an interview with Democracy Now, he said:

I ran across them when I was looking into the torture issue at Abu Ghraib, and I remember distinctly that they were on a cutting edge. I talked to people in the organization who had been active for years in total, you know, under the radar of all of us, because they didn't have photographs. They were very interested, for example, very early on in the unwarranted use of dogs in interrogations by American troops. And most of the things that I ended up writing about in Abu Ghraib, most of the general concepts, they knew a great deal about earlier.

The Christian Peacemaker Teams hostage crisis precipitated when four human rights workers of CPT, James Loney, Norman Kember, Tom Fox and Sooden, were abducted in Baghdad, Iraq on 26 November 2005 by a previously unknown group, the Swords of Righteousness Brigade. The kidnapping made media headlines around the world. The hostage-takers released videos accusing the men of being spies working for the coalition forces and threatening to execute them. On 9 March 2006, one of the hostages, Tom Fox, was executed. The remaining three were freed as part of a military operation on 23 March 2006.

Upon his return to New Zealand, Sooden was warned by Prime Minister Helen Clark not to go back to Iraq saying: "The New Zealand Government constantly says to Kiwis 'Don't go there. You are walking into a war zone. It is a very, very dangerous place and New Zealand is not represented in Iraq in any shape or form and we are not in a position to help'". One of the reasons Sooden volunteered with CPT (who were in Iraq with the permission of the US and Iraqi authorities) was to highlight New Zealand's role in the Iraq War.

Shortly after the release, both as a result of the kidnapping and the deteriorating security situation, CPT made the decision to leave Iraq. After a brief absence, CPT relocated to Iraqi Kurdistan.

Roy Hallums, a retired US Navy Commander who worked as a civilian contractor in Iraq and himself held hostage for 10 months, offered to assist the hostages in their healing process.

=== Appeals for release ===
Many individuals and groups asked for the hostages' release, including:

- 9/11 Families for Peaceful Tomorrow, an anti-war organisation composed of survivors of the World Trade Center attacks, and friends and family members of the victims, called for the hostages' release in a press release.
- On 5 December 2005, an online petition calling for the release of the hostages was signed by more than 13,000 people, including Noam Chomsky, Howard Zinn, Arundhati Roy, Jeremy Scahill, Dahr Jamail, Denis Halliday, Tariq Ali, Cindy Sheehan, Kathy Kelly, Naomi Klein, Daniel Berrigan, Michael Ratner and the parents of Rachel Corrie.
- On 6 December 2005, Mahmoud Jaballah, Mohammad Zeki Mahjoub and Hassan Almrei appealed for the release of the hostages. At the time, they were being detained in Canada without charge under security certificates on the suspicion of being linked to terrorist organisations and posing a threat to the national security of Canada. They said of James Loney, "We care about his freedom more than we do our own."
- On 7 December 2005, Abu Qatada, described by a Spanish judge as "al-Qaeda's ambassador in Europe", called for the hostages' release from a UK prison.
- On 9 December 2005, Briton Moazzem Begg, a former detainee at the Guantanamo Bay prison, made a video appeal to the kidnappers. Begg said seeing the peace workers in orange boiler suits reminded him of his own incarceration in Guantanamo Bay.
- Bruce Laingen, Kevin Hermening and Kathryn Koob, three US citizens who spent 444 days in captivity during the Iran hostage crisis, said "the families of those kidnapped in Iraq have their sympathies and prayers as they face their own hostage nightmare."
- The Independent Activates, an Iraqi human rights group, began organising for the release of the CPT hostages as soon as they heard of their detention. They held press conferences, organised vigils, and distributed leaflets. One member of the Independent Activates publicly offered to exchange himself for the hostages.

=== Release operation ===
On 23 March 2006, British Foreign Secretary Jack Straw announced: "The three hostages...have been released as a result of a multinational force operation which took place earlier today.... British forces were involved in this operation. It follows weeks and weeks of very careful work by our military and coalition personnel in Iraq and many civilians as well." It has been reported that the operation included Special Air Service (SAS) personnel from Task Force Black, a unit primarily tasked to kill or capture high-value enemy targets. Task Force Black have since been implicated in human rights abuses at secret detention facilities, including Camp Nama and H1. There were unconfirmed reports and speculation that elements of the Canadian special-operations unit Joint Task Force 2 also took part in the release operation. The identity and extent of the Canadian military contribution and the nature of its participation, if any, are unknown. Reports indicate that no kidnappers were present at the house where the hostages were found, no shots were fired and no one was injured during the operation. While it is clear the hostages were freed as part of a military operation, it is not publicly known how the Coalition Forces derived the information leading to their whereabouts, and whether they were rescued or released as part of a negotiated settlement.

=== TVNZ 'deal' ===
There was also controversy about 'chequebook journalism' on the part of state-owned TVNZ, which allegedly paid for air travel and accommodation for Sooden's family to meet him in the United Arab Emirates in exchange for the family's exclusive story. The deal was brokered with TVNZ by Sooden's former brother-in law, Mark Raymond Brewer, who has since been implicated in a number of other dubious business dealings. Sooden disassociated himself from the deal by travelling to New Zealand on a separate flight and giving an open press conference.

=== Trial of kidnappers ===
In October 2006, the Multi-National Force - Iraq (MNF-I) informed the ex-hostages that an unspecified number of men, alleged to be their kidnappers, had been captured. The authorities asked them to testify at what was described as their kidnappers' trial at the Central Criminal Court of Iraq.

On 8 December 2006, the three survivors publicly forgave their captors at a press conference held at St Ethelburga's Centre for Reconciliation and Peace in London, England. On this very day a year earlier, their kidnappers had threatened to execute them. In their joint statement of forgiveness they said, "We unconditionally forgive our captors for abducting and holding us. We have no desire to punish them.... Should those who have been charged with holding us hostage be brought to trial and convicted, we ask that they be granted all possible leniency. We categorically lay aside any rights we may have over them."

On 23 May 2007, James Loney released a public statement saying that he would not be testifying against his captors citing the lack of transparency in Iraqi courts, the limited access to lawyers and the death penalty: "I recently informed the RCMP that I will not testify. I cannot participate in a judicial process where the prospects of a fair trial are negligible, and more crucially, where the death penalty is a possibility."

=== Subsequent developments ===
There have been media reports suggesting the Christian Peacemaker Teams kidnapping is linked to the abductions of British aid worker Margaret Hassan in 2004 and United States journalist Jill Carroll in 2006, and to extrajudicial killings (for example, the death of Muharib Abdul-Latif al-Jubouri in 2007).

In 2009 and 2015, Sooden briefly returned to Iraq with Christian Peacemaker Teams on short-term assignments.

== International Solidarity Movement ==
In 2004, Sooden volunteered for the International Solidarity Movement (ISM) in the West Bank and East Jerusalem. ISM is an international human rights organisation composed of Palestinians, Israelis and internationals who monitor the human rights situation and protect human rights in the occupied Palestinian territories (OPT).

When he attempted to return to the OPT in 2008, he was declared a "threat to the security of the State of Israel" and removed from Israel after being injured and detained incommunicado for four days. The New Zealand Government launched an inquiry into his treatment by Israeli authorities. Ultimately, the New Zealand and Canadian governments refused to take any further action.

== Cubic Defence New Zealand ==
Upon his release from captivity in Iraq, the New Zealand Herald revealed Sooden had worked as a software engineer for Cubic Defence New Zealand (formerly Oscmar International), a US-owned company based in Auckland that manufactures training and simulation equipment for various armed forces around the world. During his captivity, the New Zealand Government and New Zealand media agreed under the Terrorist Event Media Protocols not to publicise details of his employment at Oscmar in case it put Sooden's life at further risk.

Oscmar had been awarded a contract to supply the Israel Defense Forces. Shortly after he resigned, Peace Movement Aotearoa, a New Zealand peace organisation, revealed that it had received leaked documents showing that the New Zealand government had denied Oscmar an export permit. Oscmar, nevertheless, tried to fulfill the contract by electronically transferring the completed design to the United States for manufacturing. This exposure forced the New Zealand Government to open an investigation. The Government's final decision was that there was no case to answer and therefore no further action would be taken. Consequently, student demonstrations took place outside Oscmar's facilities.

In 2010, it came to light that Sooden was the subject of an investigation by the Special Investigation Groups (SIG) as a suspect for defacing Oscmar's premises with graffiti. The SIG is a New Zealand Police unit "dedicated to the investigation of national security-related crime including terrorism". Sooden was quoted as saying his case appeared to be "one of many in which individuals and groups are being targeted by the [SIG] on spurious grounds."

Officers from the SIG were also involved in debriefing him after his kidnapping, and later facilitating the attempts of the Royal Canadian Mounted Police to persuade him to participate in the trial of his kidnappers.

== 2006 Fox journalists kidnapping ==
On 14 August 2006, Fox News Channel journalists Olaf Wiig (a New Zealander) and Steve Centanni in the Gaza Strip were abducted by a previously unknown Palestinian group. Sooden publicly called on the kidnappers to release Wiig and Centanni, while pointing out the context within which the kidnapping had taken place.

== Abousfian Abdelrazik ==
Former hostages Sooden and James Loney were among the 250 Canadians who risked charges under Canada's anti-terrorism legislation in the spring of 2009 for contributing funds towards a plane ticket for Abousfian Abdelrazik. Abdelrazik is a Canadian citizen who was detained in Sudan by the Sudanese Government at Canada's request, tortured, imprisoned for two years without charge, and then denied travel documents to return to Canada. The ticket the Canadians purchased helped to expose how the Canadian Government was actively blocking his return and led to the June 2009 court ruling which forced the Canadian Government to bring him home.

== Freedom Flotilla II ==
In 2011, Sooden joined Freedom Flotilla II aboard the Canadian vessel MV Tahrir to highlight the West's support for Israel's closure of Gaza. Other participants included Amira Hass, a prominent Israeli journalist, and Canadian Kevin Neish who was aboard the ill-fated MV Mavi Marmara in 2010 during the Gaza flotilla raid on the first Freedom Flotilla when Israeli special forces killed nine civilians. Sooden stated the New Zealand Government's stance on the flotilla initiative was effectively authorising Israel to 'kidnap' the flotilla participants in international waters.

== See also ==
- Christian Peacemaker hostage crisis
- Christian Peacemaker Teams
- Freedom Flotilla II
- International Solidarity Movement
- List of kidnappings
- List of solved missing person cases (2000s)
- James Loney
- Norman Kember
- Tom Fox
