= Norman Kember =

British biophysicist and peace activist (1931–2025)

- Born: Norman Frank Kember; 1931; London, England
- Died: 3 September 2025 (aged 94)
- Occupation: Academic
- Known for: Being taken hostage in Iraq

Norman Frank Kember (1931 – 3 September 2025) was a British biophysicist and peace activist. He was an emeritus professor of biophysics at Barts and The London School of Medicine and Dentistry and a Christian pacifist active in campaigning on issues of war and peace. As a Baptist, he was a long-standing member of the Baptist Peace Fellowship of North America and the Fellowship of Reconciliation. As a conscientious objector to military service, he worked in a hospital in the early 1950s, which stimulated his interest in medical physics. He was involved with the "Peace Zone" at the annual Greenbelt Festival.

In 2005, as a member of a delegation of Christian Peacemaker Teams (CPT) in Iraq, Kember was taken hostage with three other CPT members, leading to a widely publicised hostage crisis.

== Kidnapping ==
On 26 November 2005, Kember (a delegate) and three other Western peace workers with CPT (American Tom Fox and Canadians James Loney and Harmeet Singh Sooden) were kidnapped by a previously unknown group calling itself the Swords of Righteousness Brigade.

According to his family, Kember went to Iraq to help Iraqis. His family said: "Norman’s recent trip to visit the people of Iraq serves to highlight his willingness to listen to people from all backgrounds, beliefs, and walks of life and his determination to promote equality amongst all people." "He has gone to Iraq to listen, not convert; to learn from the Iraqi people, not to impose values; to promote peace and understanding."

On 5 December 2005, Kember's wife made a plea for his release. Her 30-second plea was shown on Arab broadcast station Al Jazeera. A 10 December deadline was set by the kidnappers for the release of all Iraqi prisoners, or the hostages would be executed. It passed without any word on the hostages' fate.

As the deadline passed, and with no news of his whereabouts, his friends held an hour-long silent vigil for him in Trafalgar Square, London. A further vigil was held by local dignitaries and friends at Harrow Civic Centre. Two weeks later, with the Kember family still waiting to hear news, they set up a telephone line, hoping that the kidnappers would contact them.

On 28 January 2006, a new video was released by his captors and shown on Al-Jazeera television. They stated that this was the "last chance" for their demands to be met.

On 5 March, vigils were held in Trafalgar Square to mark 100 days since Kember was taken hostage and on 7 March, a new tape of Kember was aired on Arab satellite television station al-Jazeera. Three days later, the body of Kember's American colleague Tom Fox was found.

== Release ==
On 23 March, Kember and the others were freed during a raid by multinational forces led by British Special Forces. None of the captors were present at the time of the raid, no shots were fired and no one was injured. Kember himself assumed that the non-violent manner of his release was a result of a previous campaign to get hold of one of his captors who obviously uncovered the address of the place in return for allowance to inform his comrades that they should stay away from the place.

Kember was repeatedly criticised for his response toward the military forces involved in his release. He refused to provide military intelligence with any information regarding his captors. He also requested the withdrawal of coalition forces from Iraq. On 24 March, General Sir Michael Jackson told Channel 4 News that he was "saddened that there doesn't seem to have been a note of gratitude for the soldiers who risked their lives to save those lives". On 25 March, in a phone-in discussion on BBC Radio 5 Live, Colonel Bob Stewart, a former British Commander under United Nations command in Bosnia and Herzegovina from September 1992 to May 1993 suggested that Kember and people like him were a liability, since he had ignored advice not to go to Baghdad and the security services, the British government and multinational forces had diverted valuable time and resources to rescue a "foolish, albeit well-intentioned, meddling civilian". His alleged lack of gratitude was criticised as not being characteristic of true Christian values.

== Aftermath ==
Kember arrived back in the United Kingdom on 25 March and released a written statement saying "I do not believe that a lasting peace [in Iraq] is achieved by armed force, but I pay tribute to their (the armed forces) courage and thank those who played a part in my rescue". Later that day, he also released a video statement in which he again thanked his rescuers, and those who had supported his family throughout his kidnapping.

Reverend David Coffey, general secretary of the BUGB, said: "We rejoice at the news of Norman's release and pray for his full recovery to health and well-being following this extreme ordeal. I know that Pat and Norman and the Harrow church family have been greatly strengthened by the prayers and support of so many. As we greet this news with joy, we grieve with the family of Tom Fox, and continue to hold in prayers all those who have been caught up in this long ordeal."

A public interview with Kember was recorded at the Greenbelt Christian Arts Festival at Cheltenham in August 2006.

Kember wrote an account of his kidnapping, Hostage in Iraq, which was published in 2007. He considered it an irony that he travelled to Iraq to oppose the military intervention and was flown out of Baghdad in a military helicopter, guarded by machine guns. He also discussed whether his peace testimony has been compromised and what alternatives would have been at hand. In lectures and interviews, Kember stated that what saddened him is the fact that he was alive and well, while people in Iraq, servicemen as well as civilians, are constantly threatened and many have meanwhile lost their lives.

=== Pleas for his release ===
Many individuals and groups asked for Kember's release; including: Terry Waite, radical Islamic cleric Abu Qatada, Egypt's Muslim Brotherhood, and Briton Moazzam Begg, a former detainee at the Guantanamo Bay prison.

== Arrest of kidnappers ==
On 7 November 2006, Iraqi troops arrested individuals suspected of involvement in the kidnap and imprisonment of Kember. The same day, Kember released a statement in which he refused to testify against them.

== Hostage in Iraq ==
A year after his release, Kember described his captivity in Baghdad in his book Hostage in Iraq. Writing for The Guardian newspaper, he praised his captors' conduct, saying that "I am almost surprised that we were treated so moderately by our captors – apart, that is, from the tragic, largely unexplained, decision to kill Tom Fox, the American Quaker."

In 2016, Kember reflected on his kidnap in an article for Ekklesia, saying "I do not regret my decision to go with the CPT to Baghdad".

== Abu Qatada bail ==
In May 2008, Kember provided bail security for the release of Abu Qatada. Qatada, who had appealed for Kember's release, entered the UK using a forged passport but was allowed to remain in the UK on appeal under the British Human Rights Act 1998 and European Convention on Human Rights, despite suspected continued terrorist involvement, and was held in prison until his release by the Special Immigration Appeals Commission.

== Personal life and death ==
Kember was born in London in 1931. He and Pat Cartwright were married in September 1960. They had two daughters, Jo and Sally.. In later years he retired to Weymouth in Dorset. He died on 3 September 2025, at the age of 94.

== See also ==
- Foreign hostages in Iraq
- Harmeet Singh Sooden
- James Loney
- Tom Fox
- List of kidnappings
- List of solved missing person cases (2000s)
