= Peaceworker =

Individual of an organization that undertakes to resolve violent conflicts

A peaceworker is an individual or member of an organization that undertakes to resolve violent conflict, prevent the rise of new violent conflicts, and rebuild societies damaged by war.

The term peaceworker is usually reserved for civilian, unarmed members of non-governmental organizations. Peacework is also carried out by many armed organizations such as the UN, but armed personnel are seldom called peaceworkers.

== Peacework ==
Peaceworker duties include the following:

- Bringing conflicting parties together, opening channels of communication and helping to broker a ceasefire or peace agreement
- Monitoring voting booths, providing technical expertise and other forms of support in order to help ensure a free and fair electioneering environment
- Providing protective accompaniment of people at risk, monitoring borders and other actions for stabilizing preserve ceasefire agreements and preserving human life
- Reintegrating ex-combatants into society
- Promoting a respect for human rights within the local and national legal system, strengthening local institutions and civil society organizations that defend human rights

== Peaceworker training ==
Peaceworker training and guidance are provided by organizations such as International Alert. University-provided Peace and conflict studies courses also provide valuable and relevant knowledge. As peace work can utilize a very wide variety of skills, it allows those with established, unrelated careers to take up peace work without having to abandon what they have already learned.

== See also ==
- List of peace activists
- Peacebuilding
- Peacekeeping
- Peacemaking
- Peace movement
- Human rights

== Peaceworker organizations ==
Any organization dedicated to human rights, humanitarian aid and conflict management could be said to employ peace workers. The following is just a small sample of the dozens of organizations worldwide that provide these services.

- Nonviolent Peaceforce
- International Alert
- Peace Brigades International
- Christian Peacemaker Teams
