= Tom Fox (Quaker) =

American activist (1951–2006)

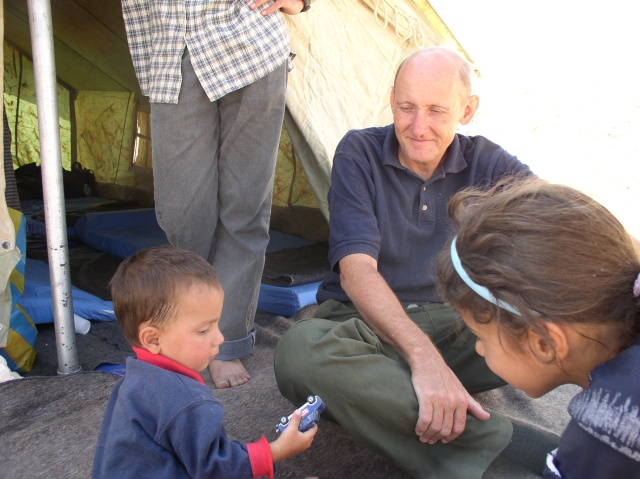
- Tom Fox with some children
- Born: Thomas William Fox; July 7, 1951; Chattanooga, Tennessee
- Died: March 9, 2006 (aged 54); Baghdad, Iraq
- Occupation: Peace activist
- Children: Katherine

Thomas William Fox (July 7, 1951 – March 9, 2006) was an American Quaker peace activist, affiliated with Christian Peacemaker Teams (CPT) in Iraq. He was kidnapped by Islamists on November 26, 2005, in Baghdad along with three other CPT activists, leading to the 2005–2006 Christian Peacemaker hostage crisis. His body was found on March 9, 2006.

== Life and career ==
From Clear Brook, Virginia, Fox graduated from the Peabody College of Vanderbilt University, and was a member of the Phi Mu Alpha Sinfonia musical fraternity. In his career, he was a leader of youth programs at Langley Hill Friends Meeting in McLean, Virginia. Fox served in many positions in Baltimore Yearly Meeting, including a stint as Youth Programs Director, where he devoted much of his time to personally working with teenagers and young adults in the Baltimore Yearly Meeting community; he served as a Friendly Adult Presence, during the majority of the BYM Young Friends program's gatherings during the first half of the 2000s (decade) and the later 1990s. He served for 20 years in the United States Marine Band and was an accomplished player of clarinet and recorder. In a public statement his daughter Katherine mentioned that on principle he refused military discounts for which he was eligible.

== Iraq hostage crisis ==
On November 26, 2005, Fox was taken hostage along with three other members of the CPT team in Iraq. The captors threatened to kill all hostages unless the United States freed all Iraqi prisoners held in the US and Iraq by December 8, 2005. They later extended this deadline to December 10, 2005. On December 10, 2005, Katherine Fox issued a statement saying that she and her father believe the Iraqi people have legitimate concerns about the United States' presence in Iraq, but "these grievances, however, will not be resolved by taking my father's life."

On March 7, 2006 Al Jazeera aired a tape which showed the other three hostages, but did not show Fox. On March 10, 2006, the U.S. State Department announced that Fox's body had been found on a garbage heap in Baghdad, shot through the head and chest. According to Iraqi police, his hands were bound and his body shows signs that it was beaten. However, a report from an “anonymous” Iraqi police official and members of CPT claimed that there were no signs of torture. The autopsy report was not released.

On March 23, 2006, the other three CPT hostages were freed by multinational forces. None of the captors were present at the time of the raid, no shots were fired and no one was injured. Muharib Abdul-Latif al-Jubouri (an Al-Qaeda in Iraq leader) is believed to have personally killed Fox. Al-Jubouri was killed in May 2007.

== See also ==
- Harmeet Singh Sooden
- Norman Kember
- James Loney
- List of kidnappings
- List of peace activists
- List of solved missing person cases (2000s)
- List of unsolved murders (2000–present)

== Bibliography ==
- Florence Fullerton, Tribute to a Peacemaker : Our Friend Tom Fox, followed by Waitinginthelight.blogspot.com Selected Entries From Tom Fox's blog, FWCC – Wider Quaker Fellowship, Philadelphia, 2006, 15 p.
