= Community Peacemaker Teams =

International pacifist and humanitarian organization

Community Peacemaker Teams or CPT (previously called Christian Peacemaker Teams) is an international organization set up to support teams of peace workers in conflict areas around the world. The organization uses these teams to achieve its aims of lower levels of violence, nonviolent direct action, human rights documentation and nonviolence training in direct action. CPT sums up their work as being "committed to reducing violence by 'getting in the way'".

The organization currently has a full-time peace force of over 30 activists working in Colombia, Iraq, the West Bank, Chiapas, Mexico and Kenora, Canada. These activists are supported by over 150 reservists who spend two weeks to two months a year on location for the organization and its activities.

Palestinians remove a roadblock while a member of CPT stands behind them.

== Christianity and CPT ==
CPT has its roots in the historic peace churches of North America, and its four supporting denominations are the Mennonite Church Canada, Mennonite Church USA, Church of the Brethren, and the Religious Society of Friends. It is also sponsored by several other Christian groups: "Every Church a Peace Church", "On Earth Peace", "Presbyterian Peace Fellowship", "Baptist Peace Fellowship of North America", and the "Congregation of St. Basil". In conflict areas it works in partnership with Jewish, Muslim and secular peace organizations, such as the International Solidarity Movement, Peace Brigades International and Nonviolent Peaceforce. Another component of CPT's work is to engage "...congregations, meetings and support groups at home to play a key advocacy role with policy makers."

Although it is a Christian-based organization, CPT does not engage in any type of missionary activity. Their website states "While CPTers have chosen to follow Jesus Christ, they do not proselytize." This has raised the question of what distinguishes them from similar "secular", organizations;

"All the groups resemble one another other in that they all work to stop violence, but according to CPT's Web site, it has an advantage over secular groups: "In Muslim areas, the Christian nature of CPT helps to create confidence because of a shared sense of monotheism." The group does not believe that its Christianity might also put it at a dangerous disadvantage in areas of the world where religious tensions run high."

Their website also states that Corp members are Christians, but there is no faith requirement for members of CPT's short-term delegations. For example, one of the CPT delegates who was held hostage in Iraq, Harmeet Singh Sooden, is a Sikh.

The Mennonite Church USA Archives is the repository of the official records of Community Peacemaker Teams.

== History ==
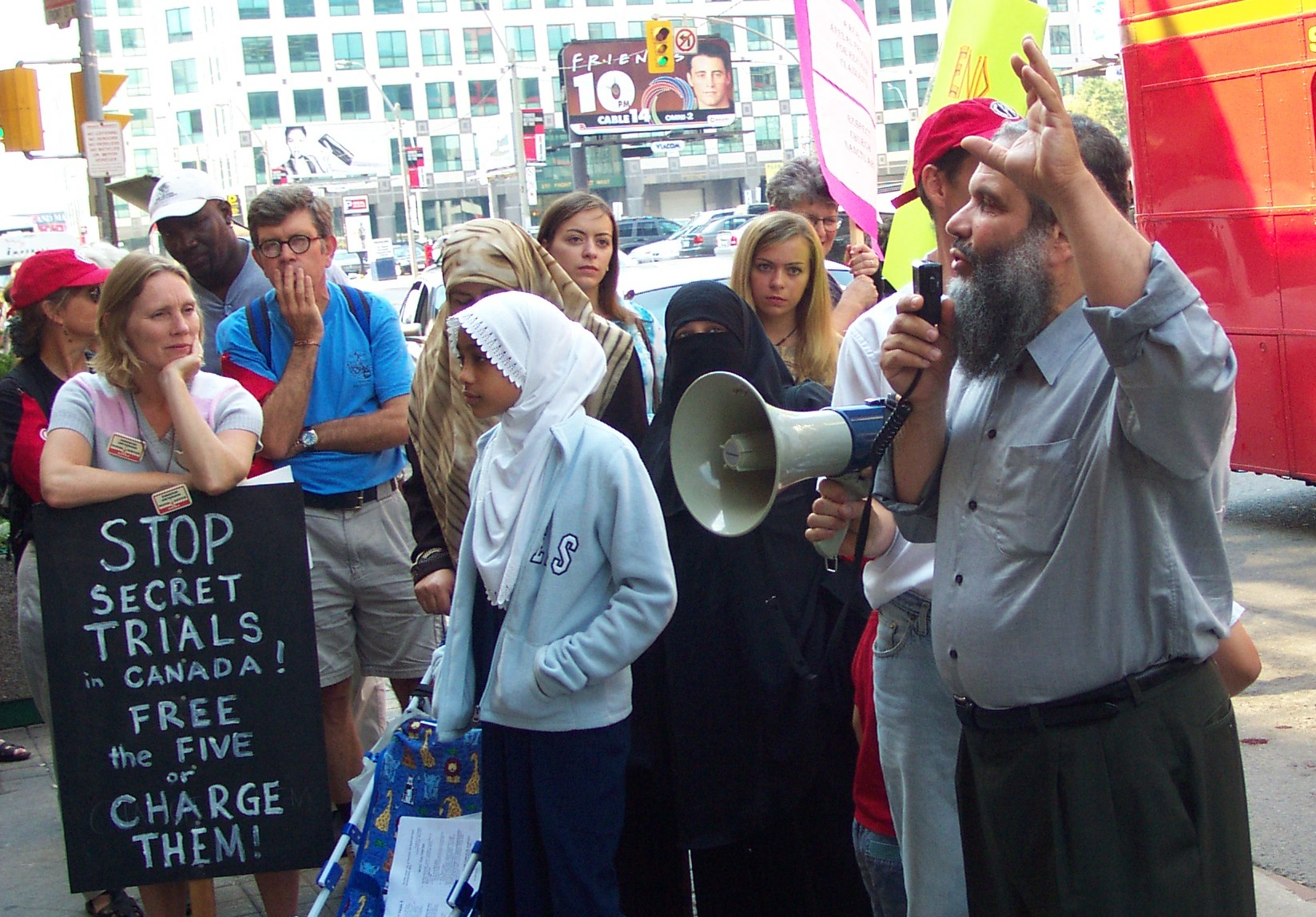
A 2004 protest by CPT outside the Toronto office of the Canadian Security Intelligence Service (CSIS), protesting the detention of non-citizens under security certificates.

The inspiration for the group came from Ron Sider at the Mennonite World Conference in 1984. At the conference, Sider criticized Mennonites and Brethren in Christ for reducing their practice of peace witnessing to simple conscientious objection:

Unless comfortable North American and European Mennonites and Brethren in Christ are prepared to risk injury and death in nonviolent opposition to the injustice our societies foster and assist in Central America, the Philippines, and South Africa, we dare never whisper another word about pacifism to our sisters and brothers in those desperate lands....

Unless we are prepared to pay the cost of peacemaking, we have no right to claim the label or preach the message.

After a series of meetings, Gene Stoltzfus was hired as the first staff person for the new organization in 1988. Over the next few years CPT trainings and conferences explored various models for international peacemaking. In 1990, just before the Gulf War, CPT sent a team of 13 to Iraq for 10 days, with Sr. Anne Montgomery among this number. This delegation proved to be the first of a number the group would later send to Haiti, Iraq, and the West Bank.

== Iraq activities ==
CPT has operated in Iraq since October 2002. Since the 2003 invasion of Iraq, they have worked with and advocated for families of people detained by the U.S. Military and collected stories of detainee abuse. In January 2004 they released a report documenting routine abuse of Iraqi prisoners held by Coalition Provisional Authority, well before the photographs of Abu Ghraib prisoners brought international attention to the issue.

=== Hostage crisis ===
On 26 November 2005, four human rights workers associated with CPT were kidnapped in Baghdad:

- James Loney, 41, of Toronto, Canada, program coordinator for CPT Canada
- Harmeet Singh Sooden, 32, of Canada, an electrical engineer and former McGill University student who had been living in New Zealand
- Norman Kember, 74, of London, UK, a retired professor of medical studies
- Tom Fox, 54, of Clearbrook, Virginia, U.S., a leader of youth programs at Langley Hill Friends Meeting

The four had been visiting the Muslim Clerics Association, an influential group of Sunni religious leaders formed in 2003 after the collapse of Saddam Hussein's regime. The group had been standing roughly 100 meters from the entrance to a mosque where the meeting had taken place when they were abducted.

Their captors were a previously unknown group, the Swords of Righteousness Brigade. The hostages were shown on a video broadcast released worldwide on 29 November by Arab satellite channel Al Jazeera. The captors branded their hostages as spies posing as Christian peace activists.

The captors threatened to kill the hostages unless the US freed all Iraqi prisoners held in the US and Iraq. A body found in Iraq on 10 March 2006 was identified later that day as being that of Tom Fox.

On March 23, 2006, the three remaining hostages were freed from a house in the Mansour neighbourhood in Baghdad by a multinational force. None of the kidnappers were found in the house at the time. The Telegraph reported that "A deal had been struck with a man detained the previous night who was one of the leaders of the kidnappers. He was allowed a telephone call to warn his henchmen to leave the kidnap house. When the troops moved in and found the prisoners alive, they also let him go as promised."

The multinational force was led by elements of 'Task Force Black' – a counterinsurgency unit consisting of British and American special forces – and allegedly Canadian JTF2 troops. The Royal Canadian Mounted Police and Canadian Security Intelligence Service were also involved.

The three surviving hostages were in good medical condition. While captive, they had been allowed to exercise and Kember had received medication he needs.

Although happy that the hostages were freed, CPT placed primary responsibility for the kidnapping on the coalition itself: "We believe that the illegal occupation of Iraq by Multinational Forces is the root cause of the insecurity which led to this kidnapping and so much pain and suffering in Iraq." CPT initially made no mention of appreciation to coalition forces for their efforts to free the hostages in its statement, but did so in a later addenda after considerable media attention. It was reported that the CPT had not cooperated with the SAS officials who coordinated the release operation. CPT co-director Doug Pritchard stated that they did not want a "military raid" to occur and preferred to work with diplomats.

== Work in Colombia ==
CPT has had a team based in Barrancabermeja, Colombia since 2001. The focus of their work has been accompanying a number of communities along the Opon river, a tributary of the Magdalena River. The farmers and fishers from these communities displaced themselves in 2000 because of heavy fighting in 2000 between the United Self-Defense Forces of Colombia (AUC) and the Revolutionary Armed Forces of Colombia (FARC). Since the community members returned to their homes in 2001, the team has had a nearly daily presence in the area to support the people, work to prevent intimidation by both AUC and FARC and document human rights abuses if they occur. The team also works with Colombian women's groups and human rights groups based in Barrancabermeja in an effort to reduce threats and violent acts carried out by the AUC in the city.

== Work in Chiapas, Mexico ==
CPT has, in the past, also been involved in Chiapas, Mexico, where violence had erupted between the Zapatista Army of National Liberation and the Mexican government. CPT's long-term presence began in June 1998. In Chiapas, CPT partnered with a Christian civil society group called Las Abejas (the Bees) that shares a commitment to pacifism. Their joint activities included going to the bases of the Mexican military to pray.

== Work in the Palestinian territories ==
As of 2014, CPT has several projects in the West Bank, one in Hebron and one in Masafer Yatta area of the South Hebron Hills. The organisation inter alia supports Palestinian nonviolent resistance to the occupation in coordination with Israeli and international organizations. CPT has been active in Hebron, At-Tuwani, Al Bowereh and the Baqa'a Valley. Part of the team's daily routines includes school patrol, and monitoring settler violence and soldier home invasions. The teams also work against home demolitions. CPT believes the Israeli occupation is violent, and that reconciliation between Palestinians and Israelis can only flourish when the occupation ends. CPT has however condemned Palestinian violence against Israeli civilians. Human Rights Watch has typified the CPT as "one of the few credible sources about the human rights situation in Hebron". CPT has been working in Hebron since 1994. Israel has denied several CPT members access to Palestine.

=== Settler attacks on schoolchildren escorts ===
On 27 September 2004, a joint team of CPT members and the international organization Operazione Colomba (Operation Dove) began escorting Palestinian schoolchildren on their way on the route from the villages of Tuba and Maghayir al-Abeed to the school in At-Tuwani, that passes between the Israeli settlement of Ma'on and the settlement outposts Hill 833 (Havat Ma'on) and Ma'on Ranch. On 29 September, two CPT members, Kim Lamberty and Chris Brown were severely injured in an ambush, when five masked men armed with a chain and bat attacked them as they were escorting Palestinian children on the route. Lamberty's arm was broken and Brown was hospitalized with cracked ribs and a punctured lung. Lamberty told The Washington Post that she was beaten while she was on ground and "saw the group go back through the grove of trees and into Ma'on Ranch". Brown told the BBC at the time that harassment of the Christian volunteers by Israeli settlers was common, Lamberty had her passport, mobile phone and money stolen by the settlers, and that they "normally throw stones at us or fire their guns over our heads – but this is the most vicious assault so far". A Ma'on settlement security guard who arrived at the spot after some time, told the CPT team that they had been attacked because they "had upset the balance of power between the settlement and Palestinians." A spokesperson for the settlers said "he had no knowledge of the incident and opposed any violation of the law".

The next month, the team members and an Amnesty International delegate as well were attacked again. Soldiers warned the Palestinian villagers that CPT was endangering their children and the violence would be even worse if the children walked home from school through the settlement area. They blamed CPT for the violence and not the settlement attackers. The Israeli army said that they would not protect the children from Israeli settlers if they are accompanied by internationals on their way to and from school and offered to escort the children safely themselves, if the internationals left. Two days later, the children were again chased by settlers from the Havat Ma’on settlement. The Israeli army patrol, which was present, did not intervene. To avoid the attacks, the children have to take a long alternative 2 hours long way. In response to these attacks, the Israeli Knesset Committee for Children's Rights initiated an order to have soldiers escort the Palestinian children to school in At-Tuwani. However, CPT's report records that as of 10 November 2006, settlers had attacked or harassed the schoolchildren 40 times, in spite of the order by the Israeli Knesset Committee for Children's Rights to protect the children.

=== Arrest of CPT observers ===
On 4 November 2004, CPT volunteers Christina Gibb (then aged 75) and fellow Christian Peacemaker Team Joe Carr (22) were arrested and detained by Israeli police for eight hours on suspicion of terrorism. The pair had been observing the activities of Israeli Defence Force soldiers at the Beit Romano checkpoint in Hebron.

Since November 2009, Community Peacemaker Teams has been escorting schoolchildren of Al Bowereh on their way home from school, to protect them from settlers violence.

== See also ==
- Christian pacifism
- Muslim Peacemaker Teams
- Mennonite Church USA Archives
- Peace makers
- List of anti-war organizations
