= James Loney (peace activist) =

Canadian peace activist (born 1964)

- Born: 1964 (age 61–62); Calgary, Alberta, Canada
- Spouse: Dan Hunt

James Loney (born 1964) is a Canadian peace activist who has worked for several years with Christian Peacemaker Teams in Iraq and Palestine. On November 26, 2005, he was kidnapped in Baghdad along with three others: Harmeet Singh Sooden (Canadian) and Norman Kember (British), both members of the delegation he was leading; and Tom Fox (American), a full-time member of CPT who had been working in Iraq since September 2004. The widely publicized hostage crisis (see Christian Peacemaker hostage crisis) ended on March 23, 2006, when Loney, Kember, and Sooden were freed in a clandestine military operation led by British Special Forces. Tom Fox was killed on March 9, two weeks before the release of the other hostages.

While Loney was held as a hostage, his family and partner Dan Hunt withheld the fact of his homosexuality out of fear for his safety. The media was aware of this fact but cooperated in keeping it secret.

He made a brief media appearance on March 30: "I'll take things slowly until I can get through a day without shaking legs and a pounding heart," he said.

== Early life ==
Loney was born in Calgary, Alberta, and was raised in Thunder Bay and Sault Ste. Marie, Ontario. During his late teens, he worked as a counsellor at Columbus Boys' Camp near Orillia, Ontario, on Lake Simcoe. This was a summer camp for underprivileged boys, funded by the Knights of Columbus and staffed by senior high school students from various schools run by the Basilian Fathers until 2002, when it was sold to Stu Saunders, who turned it into a leadership camp.

Loney was a founding member of Zacchaeus House, one of several houses that were part of the Toronto Catholic Worker. From 1990 to 2001 he was a member of the Zacchaeus House community—a house of hospitality which welcomes people in need of housing. While no longer an active part of the community, Zacchaues House continues to function today.

== After release ==
In June 2006, Loney entered headlines again for joining in the protest against the controversial use of security certificates to detain foreign residents in Canada for years without charges or trial.

On June 20, 2006, Loney and several other staff members of the Ontario Catholic Youth Leadership Camp held a press conference in Toronto in which they claimed the Knights of Columbus, a Catholic charitable organization, shut down the camp after learning about Loney's sexual orientation upon his return from captivity. The camp re-opened the following summer under the same name but with a new director and staff. On that same day, Loney and his partner Hunt were honoured at the Toronto 2006 Pride Day Gala with the Fearless Award.

According to a November 11, 2006 report in the Guelph Mercury of a speech he'd given to university students on November 9, Loney refused to wear a poppy on Remembrance Day. Loney claimed that it "says we have to be ready for the next time - vigilance."

Canadian singer-songwriter, Jon Brooks, wrote two songs on Loney's CD Ours And The Shepherds in response to the controversy. Jim Loney's Prayer Part I and Jim Loney's Prayer Part II were chosen as bookends to the track-list on a CD about Canadian war stories.

On December 8, 2006, Loney, Kember and Sooden publicly forgave their captors at a press conference held at St. Ethelburga's Peace Center, London, England. On this same day a year before their kidnappers had threatened to execute them. In their joint statement of forgiveness they said, "We unconditionally forgive our captors for abducting and holding us. We have no desire to punish them," and "Should those who have been charged with holding us hostage be brought to trial and convicted, we ask that they be granted all possible leniency. We categorically lay aside any rights we may have over them."

On May 23, 2007, Loney released a public statement saying that he would not be testifying against his captors who are now in U.S. custody citing the lack of transparency in Iraqi courts, the limited access to lawyers and the death penalty.

I recently informed the RCMP that I will not testify. I cannot participate in a judicial process where the prospects of a fair trial are negligible, and more crucially, where the death penalty is a possibility.

Loney and Harmeet Singh Sooden were among 250 Canadians who risked charges under Canada's anti-terrorism legislation in the spring of 2009 for contributing towards a plane ticket for Abousfian Abdelrazik, a Canadian man who was detained by the Sudanese government at Canada's request, tortured, imprisoned for two years without charge and then denied travel documents to return to Canada. The ticket Loney helped purchase exposed how the government was actively blocking his return and led to the June 2009 court ruling which forced the Canadian government to bring him home. Loney was one of 30 supporters who were on hand to welcome Abdelrazik home upon his arrival at Toronto's Pearson International Airport on June 27, 2009.

== See also ==
- List of kidnappings
- List of peace activists
- List of solved missing person cases (2000s)
- Harmeet Singh Sooden
- Norman Kember
- Tom Fox
