= List of kidnappings (2000–2009) =

The following is a list of kidnappings that occurred in the 2000s, summarizing the events of each case, including instances of celebrity abductions, claimed hoaxes, suspected kidnappings, extradition abductions, and mass kidnappings.

== 2000 ==
Date	Image	Victim(s)	Abductor(s)	Location	Age of victim(s)	Outcome	Notes
27 March 2000		Elza Kungayeva	Yuri Budanov	Urus-Martan, Chechen Republic, Russia	18	Murdered	18-year-old Chechen woman abducted, beaten, murdered, and allegedly raped by Russian Army Colonel Yuri Budanov during the Second Chechen War.
23 April 2000		Sipadan kidnappings victims	Abu Sayyaf	Sabah, Casimiro Village, Malaysia	Various	Rescued	Twenty-one tourists and resort workers taken hostage by six Abu Sayyaf rebels on 23 April 2000. The hostages were held on the volcanic island of Jolo, but rescued by the Philippine Army on 16 September 2000.
25 April 2000		Janet Acosta	Michael Anthony Tanzi	(United States) Cudjoe Key, Florida, U.S.	49	Murdered	Janet Acosta was kidnapped in Cudjoe Key, Florida on 25 April 2000 before being killed and buried.
4 May 2000		Jessica Russell	David Trott	British Columbia, Canada	9	Murdered	Russell disappeared from a Vancouver suburb on the morning of 4 May 2000; she was abducted and murdered by David Trott as he ostensibly took her to school. The child's strangled body was found in an incinerated trailer near Mission.
28 May 2000		Keith William Allan	Sudo Cavkic, Costas Athanasi, Julian Clarke	Melbourne, Australia	53	Murdered	Keith Allan was abducted and murdered by criminals Sudo Cavkic and Costas Athanasi on the orders of his business partner Julian Clarke, who intended to make it appear as suicide to shift blame for his financial crimes onto Allan. Allan's body was never located.
8 June 2000		Jaswinder Kaur Sidhu	Malkiat Kaur Sidhu, Surjit Singh Badesha	Punjab, India	24	Murdered	Jassi Kaur Sidhu was murdered in an honor killing by her mother and uncle as punishment for marrying a man from the same clan without her parents' permission. Her family, living in Canada, held her prisoner to try and force her to sign divorce proceedings until she escaped and fled back to India, but was kidnapped by hitmen hired by her family, who murdered her and threw her body into an irrigation canal.
23 June 2000		Leesa Gray	Thomas Edwin Loden Jr.	(United States) Dorsey, Itawamba County, Mississippi, U.S.	16	Murdered	Leesa Gray was a 16-year-old American girl from Dorsey, Itawamba County, Mississippi who was kidnapped and murdered on 22 June 2000 by a man named Thomas Edwin Loden Jr. who was a Marine Corps recruiter. Loden was convicted of the murder and executed in 2022.
27 June 2000		Molly Bish	Unknown	(United States) Warren, Massachusetts, U.S.	16	Murdered	Molly Bish disappeared from her job as a lifeguard at Comins Pond in Warren, Massachusetts, in June 2000. Her remains were found in a neighbouring county three years later. She is believed to be a homicide victim but nobody has been charged with the crime.
1 July 2000		Sarah Payne	Roy Whiting	West Sussex, England	8	Murdered	Payne was kidnapped as she walked from a cornfield close to her grandfather's home. She was later murdered by strangulation and/or suffocation. The subsequent investigation became a high-profile murder case in the United Kingdom. Following his conviction, Whiting was imprisoned for life and is currently being held in the maximum security Wakefield prison, West Yorkshire.
1 July 2000		Lucie Blackman	Joji Obara	Tokyo, Japan	21	Died	British tourist Lucie Blackman, who had a temporary job at a hostess bar, was abducted while on a paid date with serial rapist Joji Obara. Her dismembered remains were found a few hundred metres from Obara's apartment the following year. Her cause of death is unknown, though it is suspected that Obara accidentally drugged her to death while trying to sedate and rape her. Obara was convicted of abducting Blackman and of dismembering her corpse, but not of killing her.
29 July 2000		Iriana DeJesus	Alexis Flores	(United States) Philadelphia, Pennsylvania, U.S.	5	Murdered	Iriana DeJesus was abducted in the Hunting Park neighbourhood and found dead five days later, having been molested, strangled and wrapped in a trash bag. Her alleged killer, Alexis Flores, was put on the FBI Ten Most Wanted Fugitives list. Flores was captured in Honduras in February 2026.
10 August 2000		Midsi Sanchez	Curtis Dean Anderson	(United States) California, U.S.	8	Escaped	Eight-year-old Midsi Sanchez was abducted and sexually assaulted for nearly three days. She escaped after her abductor left her alone in his car with his keys. Curtis Dean Anderson was later convicted of kidnapping and sexually assaulting Sanchez; Anderson also confessed to the kidnappings and murders of several other girls, including Amber Swartz-Garcia.
25 August 2000		Ivan Stambolić	Special Operations Unit	Belgrade, Federal Republic of Yugoslavia	63	Murdered	Stambolić was the former president of Yugoslavia who disappeared in August 2000, one month before the national elections in which he was expected to contest incumbent Slobodan Milošević. The official story was that he vanished while jogging, but a witness stated that Stambolić was detained at gunpoint and forced into a van by men claiming to be police. Stambolić's body was unearthed on Fruška Gora three years later. It was eventually determined that he was abducted and killed by the elite Special Operations Unit, likely on the orders of President Milošević. Six police operatives, including Special Operations Unit leader Milorad Ulemek and former State Security chief Radomir Marković, were convicted of Stambolić's murder.
3 October 2000		Elhanan Tannenbaum	Hezbollah militants	Dubai, United Arab Emirates	54	Released	Polish-born Israeli businessman and drug dealer kidnapped by Hezbollah militants while conducting a supposed drug deal in Dubai. He was held for three years and released in a hostage exchange and returned to Israel.
11 November 2000		Rosemary Corcoran	Philip Smith	Digbeth, Birmingham, England	25	Murdered	Corcoran was abducted by a man she just met at the Rainbow Pub in the Digbeth area of Birmingham. They were seen leaving together but CCTV later showed her being dragged into his car. He drove her against her will to Worcestershire near the M5 motorway and bludgeoned her to death. Smith had killed a person three days prior and killed another woman later that day. He may also have killed a further victim the month before. He received a life sentence and remains in custody.
21 November 2000		Michelle Renee	Christopher Butler and Lisa Ramirez	(United States) California, U.S.	35	Released	Renee, her 7-year-old daughter and her roommate were forced to wear false explosive devices before Renee, a bank manager, was forced to rob $360,000 from her bank under threat of death. All three were later released. The case inspired the 2009 Lifetime film Held Hostage.
26 November 2000		Leanne Tiernan	John Taylor	Leeds, England	16	Murdered	Tiernan was abducted and murdered while returning from a shopping trip. Her body was found on 20 August 2001 in a nearby woodland, and evidence led to Taylor's arrest. He was found guilty on 8 July 2002 and received two life sentences.

== 2001 ==
Date	Image	Victim(s)	Abductor(s)	Location	Age of victim(s)	Outcome	Notes
15 January 2001		Bridget Townsend	Ramiro Felix Gonzales	(United States) San Antonio, Texas, U.S.	17	Murdered	On the night of 15 January 2001, 17-year-old Bridget Townsend was abducted from her drug dealer boyfriend's house by a customer of her boyfriend. The abductor, 18-year-old Ramiro Felix Gonzales, forcibly took her to his grandfather's ranch, raped her and fatally shot her with a rifle. Gonzales, who was later caught and sentenced to life in prison for a different rape and kidnapping, confessed to the murder and led the police to a field where he disposed of Townsend's body in October 2002. Gonzales was convicted of capital murder and sentenced to death, and later executed on June 26, 2024.
16 February 2001		Kandee Martin	Marion Bowman Jr.	(United States) Dorchester County, South Carolina, U.S.	21	Murdered	21-year-old Kandee Martin was shot to death by a high school acquaintance in Dorchester County, South Carolina, on 16 February 2001. Her body was discovered inside the truck of her burned car the following day. Marion Bowman Jr. was subsequently arrested and charged with murder and arson; he was convicted of both counts on 24 May 2002 and was sentenced to death.
6 April 2001		Anne Sluti	Anthony Steven "Tony Zappa" Wright	(United States) Kearney, Nebraska, U.S.	17	Released/rescued	Sluti was kidnapped from a mall parking lot in April 2001, taken out of state, and raped for six days before Wright surrendered to police.
9 April 2001		Miroslav Mišković	Criminal group	Serbia	56	Released	Miroslav Mišković is a Serbian business magnate who was kidnapped by a criminal group and held hostage for 18 hours until his ransom was paid. The same criminal group later murdered the prime minister Zoran Đinđić in 2003.
1 May 2001		Leah Henry	Gary Dale Cox	(United States) Houston, U.S.	11	Released/rescued	Henry was kidnapped and was rescued 3 days later, after which the suspect killed himself.
27 May 2001		Over one hundred hostages	Abu Sayyaf	Honda Bay, Palawan, Philippines	Various	Murdered/rescued	Many people were kidnapped in the Dos Palmas kidnappings. Dozens were killed.
18 June 2001		Danielle Jones	Stuart Campbell	East Tilbury, Essex, England	15	Murdered	Jones was abducted by her uncle while on her way to school and subsequently murdered. Campbell was convicted and sentenced to life imprisonment in 2002.
21 August 2001		Jason Martin-Smith	Mark Searle, Jimmy Millen, Steve McNichol	Hastings, England	28	Murdered	Jason Martin-Smith was kidnapped outside a friend's house by his criminal associates after they discovered he was talking to the police about a burglary they were involved in. He was murdered the following day and his body was dismembered and burnt. One perpetrator was murdered two months later; two others were eventually convicted in 2015.
21 August 2001		Patrícia Abravanel	Marcelo Batista Santos, Esdras Dutra Pinto	São Paulo, Brazil	23	Released	On 21 August 2001, Patricia Abravanel, daughter of Brazilian media mogul and television personality Silvio Santos, was abducted in São Paulo and released from her captors on August 28. On August 30, Santos was held hostage by Fernando Dutra Pinto in his mansion in Morumbi for eight hours. Pinto died in prison in 2002; his accomplices were each sentenced to at least 15 years in prison.
30 August 2001		Silvio Santos	Fernando Dutra Pinto	São Paulo, Brazil	70	Released	On 21 August 2001, Patricia Abravanel, daughter of Brazilian media mogul and television personality Silvio Santos, was abducted in São Paulo and released from her captors on August 28. On August 30, Santos was held hostage by Fernando Dutra Pinto in his mansion in Morumbi for eight hours. Pinto died in prison in 2002; his accomplices were each sentenced to at least 15 years in prison.
11 September 2001		Michele Harris	Unknown	(United States) Spencer, New York, U.S.	35	Unknown	Michele Harris disappeared after leaving the home of her boyfriend Brian Early on September 11, 2001. Her car was found abandoned at the end of her driveway, suggesting she was stopped and abducted from the car while on her way home. Her estranged husband Cal was convicted of her murder; witnesses later implicated another unidentified man in Michele's abduction, and Cal was released on appeal after eight years. Michele has never been found.
28 September 2001		Yvonne Ridley	Taliban	Afghanistan	43	Released	Yvonne Ridley is a British journalist who was captured on 28 September 2001 by the Taliban in Afghanistan and held as she was suspected to be a spy. After 11 days, she was released and became an activist after she converted to Islam.
27 October 2001		Mohammed Haydar Zammar	Moroccan police	Morocco	39-40	Released	A Syrian-German militant known as a senior al-Qaeda recruiter. Zammar was arrested by Moroccan police with the assistance of the U.S. when travelling to Morocco on October 27, 2001. He was secretly sent to Syria for indefinite detention in the Far'Falastin detention center, but was released as part of a prisoner exchange in September 2013.
18 November 2001		Alexandra Flores	David Santiago Renteria	(United States) El Paso, Texas, U.S.	5	Murdered	Abducted while wandering around a Walmart by a convicted sex offender who raped and murdered her. Flores' body was found the next day. Renteria was convicted and sentenced to death for the crime.

== 2002 ==
Date	Image	Victim(s)	Abductor(s)	Location	Age of victim(s)	Outcome	Notes
1 January 2002		Alicia Kozakiewicz	Scott Tyree	(United States) Pittsburgh, Pennsylvania, U.S.	13	Rescued	Kozakiewicz was groomed over the Internet and lured to meet Tyree, who forced her into his vehicle and took her to his Virginia home. She was held captive, shackled, raped, and tortured for four days in Tyree's basement, and he broadcast his actions via live streaming video. One viewer of Tyree's live streams anonymously reported his actions to the FBI, who tracked down Kozakiewicz and freed her. Kozakiewicz became a motivational speaker and advocate for missing persons.
18 January 2002		Celso Daniel	Unknown	Jardins, Brazil	50	Murdered	Mayor of Santo André who was abducted by criminals and later killed, his body found 8 days after his kidnapping. His murderers have never been identified, but the motive is suspected to be political.
23 January 2002		Daniel Pearl	Al-Qaeda	Karachi, Pakistan	38	Murdered	Pearl, an American journalist for the Wall Street Journal, was abducted by Islamist militants linked to Al-Qaeda while on his way to an interview with Mubarak Ali Gilani. A few days after his abduction, Pearl's captors released a video in which he was forced to denounce United States foreign policy and then beheaded. Four Pakistanis, including Ahmed Omar Saeed Sheikh, were convicted of kidnapping and murder in 2002; however, U.S. authorities later concluded that Pearl's killer was in fact Khalid Sheikh Mohammed, third-in-command of Al-Qaeda. The four convicted men's murder convictions were overturned in 2020 and their death sentences were reduced to time served for kidnapping Pearl. As of 2024, they remain in government custody as the decision is appealed.
1 February 2002		Danielle van Dam	David Westerfield	(United States) Sabre Springs, San Diego, California, U.S.	7	Murdered	van Dam was abducted from her bed the night of 1–2 February; her body was found three weeks later in a remote area. Westerfield, a neighbor, was convicted of kidnapping and first degree murder, and sentenced to death for the crime. He is currently incarcerated at San Quentin State Prison.
23 February 2002		Íngrid Betancourt	Revolutionary Armed Forces of Colombia	Colombia	40	Rescued	Betancourt, a presidential candidate, was kidnapped and held captive until 2008.
21 March 2002		Amanda "Milly" Dowler	Levi Bellfield	Surrey, England	13	Murdered	Dowler disappeared on her way home from school. Her body was found on 18 September 2002. Bellfield was found guilty of her abduction and murder on 23 June 2011.
21 April 2002		Gilberto Echeverri Mejía	Revolutionary Armed Forces of Colombia	Colombia	66	Murdered	Mejía and Correa were both kidnapped by guerrilla fighters while participating in a march against violence on 21 April 2002; both were murdered, alongside eight other captives, on 5 May 2003, following a rescue operation.
21 April 2002		Guillermo Gaviria Correa	Revolutionary Armed Forces of Colombia	Colombia	40	Murdered	Mejía and Correa were both kidnapped by guerrilla fighters while participating in a march against violence on 21 April 2002; both were murdered, alongside eight other captives, on 5 May 2003, following a rescue operation.
3 May 2002		Alexis Patterson	Unknown	(United States) Milwaukee, Wisconsin, U.S.	7	Unknown	Patterson was last seen by her stepfather, LaRon Bourgeois, as he dropped her off at school. Her parents reported her missing when she did not return home, at which time they learned that Alexis had not been in class and was not even seen inside the school building. On 14 May 2002, investigators officially announced they were pursuing the case as a likely criminal act. No trace of her has been found, nor have investigators ascertained further information about her disappearance.
5 June 2002		Elizabeth Smart	Brian David Mitchell and Wanda Eileen Barzee	(United States) Salt Lake City, Utah, U.S.	14	Rescued	Elizabeth Smart was kidnapped from her bedroom, and was found alive nine months later in a suburb of Salt Lake City on 12 March 2003. Mitchell was sentenced to life in prison for the kidnapping, while Barzee was sentenced to 15 years.
24 June 2002		Kara Robinson Chamberlain	Richard Evonitz	(United States) Columbia, South Carolina, U.S.	15	Escaped	Robinson was kidnapped from a friend's garden and taken to Evonitz's apartment. She escaped out the front door during the night and later led police to the apartment where she was held.
15 July 2002		Samantha Runnion	Alejandro Avila	(United States) Stanton, California, U.S.	5	Murdered	Runnion was kidnapped from the front yard of her home. Her body was found one day later in Cleveland National Forest. Avila is currently incarcerated at San Quentin State Prison in California.
22 July 2002		Erica Pratt	Edward Johnson and James Burns	(United States) Philadelphia, Pennsylvania, U.S.	7	Escaped	Pratt was forced into a car from a street. She escaped by gnawing through duct tape used to bind her and smashing a window.
26 July 2002		Casey Williamson	Johnny Johnson	(United States) Valley Park, Missouri, U.S.	6	Murdered	Williamson was staying in the same house as ex-convict Johnson, who lured her out of the house and took her to a sunken pit in the woods, where he beat her to death after trying to rape her. He then buried her beneath a pile of glass and rocks. Johnson was executed for the crime in 2023.
12 August 2002		Arjan Erkel	Three gunmen	Makhachkala, Russia	32	Released	Erkel was a medical aid worker for Doctors Without Borders (Médecins Sans Frontières) when he was kidnapped. Twenty months later he was released after the Dutch government paid a ransom of €1,000,000.
22 August 2002		Michelle Knight	Ariel Castro	(United States) Cleveland, Ohio, U.S.	21	Rescued	Knight was last seen when she left her cousin's house. Knight, along with Amanda Berry, Berry's child who was born in captivity, and Gina DeJesus, were found alive and in reasonable health within three miles of the site of their disappearances on 6 May 2013.
27 September 2002		Jakob von Metzler	Magnus Gäfgen	Frankfurt, Germany	11	Murdered	An 11-year-old boy kidnapped and murdered by law student Magnus Gäfgen. Von Metzler was kidnapped for ransom, but murdered before the ransom was paid. Gäfgen was sentenced to life imprisonment in 2003.
6 October 2002		Shawn Hornbeck	Michael J. Devlin	(United States) Richwoods, Missouri, U.S.	11	Rescued	Hornbeck was kidnapped while riding his bike near his home. He was sexually assaulted and tortured by his kidnapper, Michael Devlin, eventually promising the man to not run away if Devlin kept him alive. Hornbeck was given much freedom, and told neighbors he was home-schooled. After four years, Devlin was losing sexual interest in him, and so kidnapped another boy, William "Ben" Ownby, with Hornbeck in the car to keep him quiet. The police investigated Devlin and spoke to Hornbeck, but the teenager gave his name as Shawn Wilcox and claimed to be staying with Devlin while his father was on a business trip. The next day, when police told Devlin they were going to check his pick-up's tires against tracks at the scene of Ownby's kidnapping, Devlin admitted he had both Hornbeck and Ben alive in his apartment. When Shawn was asked his name again without Devlin in the room, he told the police he was Shawn Hornbeck.
11 November 2002		Samantha Nicole Burns	Unknown	(United States) Huntington, West Virginia, U.S.	19	Unknown	Burns, a student of Marshall Community and Technical College's Physical Therapy Program, was abducted at the Marshall University Court Yard Apartments. She was last heard from by her mother at 9:45pm, and her car was discovered burning around the Cabell/Wayne County lines at 3:30am on 12 November 2002. She has not been seen or heard from since, she is presumed dead, and no remains have been recovered. South Carolina Death Row inmates Chadwick E. Fulks and Branden L. Basham claim responsibility for her disappearance. At that time they were escapees of another correctional facility. They have yet to provide enough credible details that lead to Burns' whereabouts.
14 November 2002		Ted Price	Aaron Gunches	(United States) Mesa, Arizona, U.S.	40	Murdered	Price was abducted and murdered following a heated argument with his former partner Katherine Lecher, after he discovered she was addicted to meth and abusing the drug in the presence of their two children. Lecher then requested her drug dealer Gunches "take care of" the situation. Gunches and an acquaintance drove Price into the desert along the Beeline Highway, where Gunches shot him four times.
3 December 2002		Kacie Rene Woody	David Leslie Fuller	(United States) Holland, Arkansas, U.S.	13	Murdered	Woody was groomed online by Fuller, who lived in California and posed as a 17-year-old when he was really 47. He traveled to her home in Arkansas and abducted her at approximately 9:41pm* on 3 December 2002. The next day, law enforcement found them both deceased inside a storage unit in Conway, where Fuller had bound and raped Woody inside his rented minivan before shooting her and himself.
7 December 2002		Breann Voth	Derek Post	Port Coquitlam, Canada	19	Murdered	Voth was last seen alive in the early hours of 7 December 2002. Her naked body was discovered near the Coquitlam River. Her murderer, Derek Post, was arrested the following month. He was found guilty of Voth's first degree murder.

== 2003 ==
Date	Image	Victim(s)	Abductor(s)	Location	Age of victim(s)	Outcome	Notes
c. 2003		Sheila White	Unknown	(United States) New York City, New York, U.S.	15	Escaped	Teenager who became a human trafficking victim after being sent to a group home, where she was repeatedly raped and abused by a pimp who forced her into prostitution. She eventually managed to escape and has since become an anti-sex trafficking activist.
9 January 2003		Estelle Mouzin	Michel Fourniret	Guermantes, France	9	Murdered	Nine-year-old Estelle Mouzin was kidnapped while walking home from school, and has never been found. Michel Fourniret, a pedophilic serial killer known as "The Ogre of the Ardennes", admitted to the crime while serving a separate life sentence in 2020. He died before he could stand trial and his wife Monique Olivier was later found guilty of being an accomplice.
15 February 2003		Amarjit Chohan	Kenneth Regan, William Horncy, Peter Rees	Hounslow, London, England	45	Murdered	Main article: Chohan family murders Amarjit Chohan was abducted by his business associates Regan, Horncy, and Rees, who tortured him until he signed a document granting Regan power of attorney over his company. Regan and Horncy then went to Chohan's home and abducted his wife Nancy, their infant sons Ravinder and Devinder and Nancy's mother, Charanjit Kaur, to create the appearance that Chohan left the country with his family. All five were killed and initially buried on a farm in Tiverton before being dug up and thrown in the sea. Ravinder and Devinder's bodies were never found.
15 February 2003		Nancy Chohan	Kenneth Regan, William Horncy, Peter Rees	Hounslow, London, England	24	Murdered	
15 February 2003		Ravinder Chohan	Kenneth Regan, William Horncy, Peter Rees	Hounslow, London, England	18 months	Murdered	
15 February 2003		Devinder Chohan	Kenneth Regan, William Horncy, Peter Rees	Hounslow, London, England	8 weeks	Murdered	
15 February 2003		Charanjit Kaur	Kenneth Regan, William Horncy, Peter Rees	Hounslow, London, England	51	Murdered	
17 February 2003		Hassan Mustafa Osama Nasr	CIA agents	Milan, Italy	39	Released	Hassan Mustafa Osama Nasr is an Egyptian cleric who was kidnapped on 7 February 2003 in Milan, Italy and was later tortured in Egypt after he was sent to prison.
22 February - April 2003		32 European tourists	Salafist Group for Preaching and Combat	(Algeria) Algerian Desert	Various	31 released, 1 died	Several different travel groups, collectively including 16 Germans, 10 Austrians, 4 Swiss, a Dutchman and a Swede, were traveling on an Algerian Sahara tourist route when an Islamic group abducted them to get money for weapons. The first group was freed by the People's National Army on 17 May 2003. The second group was taken to Mali, where they were released on 18 August. One hostage, 45-year-old German woman Michaela Spitzer, died from heatstroke.
21 April 2003		Amanda Berry	Ariel Castro	(United States) Cleveland, Ohio, U.S.	16	Escaped	Berry was abducted one day before her 17th birthday. During captivity, she gave birth to a daughter. Just over 10 years later, on 6 May 2013, Berry escaped with her daughter, assisted by neighbors responding to her screams when Castro absented himself after failing to secure all but an outer door of the house. This led to the rescue of two other captives (Michelle Knight and Gina DeJesus). The victims were all in reasonable health and within three miles of the site of their abductions.
11 May 2003		Gareth O'Connor	Provisional Irish Republican Army	Newtownhamilton, Northern Ireland, UK	24	Murdered	O'Connor was a member of the Real Irish Republican Army and a British informant who was abducted and murdered while driving to a Garda station in Dundalk, where he had to regularly go as part of his bail conditions after he was charged for a Real IRA membership. His body was discovered on 28 June 2005 in his car, in the Newry Canal.
12 May 2003		Holly Jones	Michael Briere	Toronto, Ontario, Canada	10	Murdered	Jones was abducted, sexually assaulted and strangled by Michael Briere while walking home from school. Briere, who attributed his actions to watching child pornography, then dismembered her body and attempted to sink the remains in a pair of duffel bags in the Toronto Harbour.
25 May 2003		Acacia Bishop	Kelly Lodmell	(United States) Idaho Falls, Idaho, U.S.	1	Unknown but believed to be murdered	Bishop was abducted by her mentally ill grandmother and is believed to have been killed by being thrown in the Snake River.
23 July 2003		Nireah Johnson	Paul Moore, Curtis Ward	(United States) Indianapolis, Indiana, U.S.	17	Murdered	Johnson, a transgender woman, and her cisgender friend Brandie Coleman were murdered by Paul Moore and Curtis Ward after Moore, who was sexually attracted to Johnson, became enraged when he discovered she was transgender. Moore and Ward tied them up with wire, forced them into Ward's car, drove them to a wooded area, and shot them. They later burned the car containing the bodies with help from Moore's brother, Clarence McGee.
23 July 2003		Brandie Coleman	Paul Moore, Curtis Ward	(United States) Indianapolis, Indiana, U.S.	18	Murdered	Johnson, a transgender woman, and her cisgender friend Brandie Coleman were murdered by Paul Moore and Curtis Ward after Moore, who was sexually attracted to Johnson, became enraged when he discovered she was transgender. Moore and Ward tied them up with wire, forced them into Ward's car, drove them to a wooded area, and shot them. They later burned the car containing the bodies with help from Moore's brother, Clarence McGee.
7 September 2003		Gyanendra Khadka	Maoist rebels	Jyamire, Sindhupalchok District, Nepal	35	Murdered	A Nepalese journalist murdered by insurgents on 7 September 2003 during the Maoist insurgency in Nepal.
20 October 2003		Cecilia Zhang	Min Chen	Toronto, Canada	9	Murdered	Chen abducted Zhang from her home in the middle of the night and killed her. Her body was found on 27 March 2004. Chen claimed her death was an accident, but was later sentenced to life in prison in 2006 for her murder.
22 November 2003		Dru Sjodin	Alfonso Rodriguez	(United States) Grand Forks, North Dakota, U.S.	22	Murdered	Sjodin was kidnapped outside the Columbia Mall while on the phone with her boyfriend Chris Lang. Sex offender Alfonso Rodriguez was arrested in connection with her disappearance a week later, and her body was recovered in Crookston, Minnesota the following year. Rodriguez was twice convicted on federal charges of kidnapping resulting in death in relation to Sjodin's murder.
7 December 2003		Daniel Morcombe	Brett Peter Cowan	Sunshine Coast, Queensland, Australia	13	Murdered	Morcombe was abducted while waiting for a bus under an overpass. Previously convicted child sex offender Brett Peter Cowan was charged in August 2011 for Morcombe's abduction and murder before a search site was established in remote bushlands near the Glass House Mountains for his body. Skeletal remains were eventually found and DNA tests confirmed they belonged to Morcombe. Cowan was sentenced to life imprisonment on 14 March 2014.
18 December 2003		Daniel Larson	Unknown, Mexican Mafia (suspected)	(United States) Weld County, Colorado, U.S.	34	Murdered	An owner of a recycling plant in Fort Hood who disappeared after telling his family that he had to meet with members of the Mexican Mafia over a debt payment. His car was discovered at a park and ride on 28 December with much blood in the trunk. On 13 January 2004 hunters discovered his body in a field.
25 December 2003		Unnamed seven-year-old girl	Tan Ping Koon and Chua Ser Lien	Singapore	7	Released	On the morning of Christmas Day, 42-year-old Chua Ser Lien and his 35-year-old accomplice Tan Ping Koon kidnapped a seven-year-old girl from her home at Yio Chu Kang. They were observed by several witnesses, one of whom tailed the pair while another took down the registration number of the get-away vehicle. After discovering they were being followed, Tan and Chua released the girl. They later attempted to extort ransom from the girl's father after threatening her and her family's safety. Both kidnappers were arrested and sentenced to life imprisonment and three strokes of the cane. In July 2020, at age 58, Chua committed suicide in prison.
31 December 2003		Khalid El-Masri	Macedonian police and U.S. Central Intelligence Agency	Skopje, North Macedonia	40	Released	A German, Lebanese and French citizen who was mistakenly abducted by the Macedonian police in 2003, and later handed over to the U.S. Central Intelligence Agency (CIA) upon the mistaken belief he was Khalid al-Masri. Later flown to Afghanistan, he endured various forms of degradation and mistreatment, but was released in April 2004.

== 2004 ==
Date	Victim(s)	Abductor(s)	Location	Age of victim(s)	Outcome	Notes
3 February 2004	Wu Ruofu	Unknown	Beijing, China	42	Rescued	Actor Wu Ruofu was kidnapped by a gang targeting wealthy businessmen. He was rescued after 23 hours in captivity, just before he was to be executed. Three of the abductors were sentenced to death a year later. A film was released in 2015 based on the case, titled Saving Mr. Wu, in which Wu plays a police captain.
4 February 2004	Carlie Brucia	Joseph P. Smith	(United States) Sarasota, Florida, U.S.	11	Murdered	Brucia was abducted and murdered after being taken from a car wash, which had been filmed by security cameras.
26 February 2004	See Sheau Fang	Kher Tian Hock	Selangor, Malaysia	18	Murdered	See was abducted by Kher after she was last seen boarding his car to go out for tea with Kher. Kher raped and killed See, and buried her body in cement in a friend's front yard. Kher was arrested a month after the crime, but escaped from the police station and hid for seven years before being arrested again for vehicular theft. Kher was sentenced to death in 2015, and remains on death row since 2024 after losing his final appeal.
9 March 2004	Brittany Hendrickson	Fred Mundt Jr.	(United States) Lebanon, Ohio, U.S.	7	Murdered	Hendrickson was kidnapped from her home by her mother's boyfriend, Frederick Mundt, who was babysitting her and her siblings. She was raped and suffered blunt-force trauma, dying from drowning after Mundt threw her into a well. Mundt was later arrested and his DNA found to match samples taken during Hendrickson's autopsy. He was sentenced to the death penalty, upheld upon appeal.
15 March 2004	Kriss Donald	Five Pakistani men	Glasgow, Scotland	15	Murdered	Schoolboy who was abducted and subsequently stabbed to death by a gang of British Pakistani men. The racially motivated murder sparked controversy for the lack of coverage in such cases.
2 April 2004	Gina DeJesus	Ariel Castro	(United States) Cleveland, Ohio, U.S.	14	Rescued	Just over nine years after DeJesus' abduction, on 6 May 2013, she was rescued along with Amanda Berry, Michelle Knight, and Berry's child who had been born in captivity. They were in reasonable health and within three miles of the site of their disappearances.
10 April 2004	Nick Berg	Al-Qaeda	Baghdad, Iraq	26	Murdered	Berg, an American freelance radio repairman working in Iraq during the United States' invasion, was abducted by Islamist militants linked to Al-Qaeda in retaliation for the Abu Ghraib torture and prisoner abuse. In May of that year, Al-Qaeda released a video in which Berg was beheaded on-camera by senior Al-Qaeda member Abu Musab al-Zarqawi.
24 May 2004	Brooke Wilberger	Joel Courtney	(United States) Corvallis, Oregon, U.S.	19	Murdered	Wilberger was kidnapped while on vacation visiting her sister in Oregon. In 2009, convicted rapist Joel Courtney pled guilty to abducting, raping and murdering Wilberger, directing police to her body. According to Courtney, he kept Wilberger in his van for a night before raping her and beating her to death the next morning.
16 June 2004	Sean Goldman	Bruna Bianchi Carneiro Ribeiro	Brazil	4	Released	An international child abduction case. Goldman was abducted from the United States by his Brazilian mother when she took her son to her native country, ostensibly for a two-week vacation. She refused to return to the United States with her child and successfully filed for a divorce. Four years later, Goldman's mother died while giving birth to a child with her second husband. He was returned to his father in 2009.
9 July 2004	Leigh Matthews	Donovan Moodley	Morningside, Johannesburg, South Africa	21	Murdered	The day after Matthews' 21st birthday, Moodly kidnapped her from the Bond University campus. After collecting the negotiated ransom, Moodly shot and killed Matthews in fear that releasing her might lead to his capture.
19 August 2004	Enzo Baldoni	Islamic Army in Iraq militants	Najaf, Iraq	55	Murdered	Italian freelance journalist who was kidnapped by Islamist militants while in Iraq. His captors later filmed his execution, but his body was never recovered.
October 2004	Paul Taggart	Islamic militants	Sadr City, Iraq	24	Released	American photographer who was held hostage by an unidentified group of Islamic militants and held for three days, whereupon he was released without harm.
7 October 2004	Sindee Neo	Constance Chee Cheong Hin	Telok Blangah, Singapore	4	Murdered	A four-year-old child who was abducted from her flat by 36-year-old Constance Chee Cheong Hin (徐嫦欣 Xú Chángxīn), who formerly had an affair with Neo's father. Neo subsequently fell off her block and sustained head injuries, which resulted in her death five days later. Chee, who was allegedly responsible for Neo's fatal fall, was charged with murder, an offence which warranted the death penalty within Singapore's jurisdiction.
19 October 2004	Margaret Hassan	Unknown	Baghdad, Iraq	59	Murdered	Hassan, an Irish aid worker, was kidnapped and later killed on 8 November by terrorists. Her remains were never recovered.
20 October 2004	Wonny Ho Wong	Gilberto Ventura Ceballos, Fernando Carela Trinidad	San Cristóbal, Dominican Republic	Unknown	Released	On 20 October 2004 Gilberto Ventura Ceballos and Fernando Carela Trinidad kidnapped Chinese merchant Wonny Ho Wong while disguised as police officers. Wong was held for ransom and was released after 26 hours of captivity after Wong's family paid RD$1,500,000.
17 November 2004	Kaede Ariyama	Kaoru Kobayashi	Nara, Japan	7	Murdered	Abducted while walking home from school by convicted pedophile Kaoru Kobayashi, who murdered her and then dumped her body in Heguri, which was found on the same day. The murder caused a moral panic against otaku culture.

== 2005 ==
Date	Image	Victim(s)	Abductor(s)	Location	Age of victim(s)	Outcome	Notes
19 January 2005		João José de Vasconcellos Júnior	Jamaat Ansar al-Sunna and the Mujahideen Brigades	Baiji, Iraq	49	Murdered	After Vasconcellos, a Brazilian civil engineer, disappeared, the jihadist groups claimed to have kidnapped him, but they shortly ceased communications without officially asking for ransom. His body was sent anonymously on 4 June 2007 to the United States Army, where his identity was determined by his dental arch and the cause of the death being "several injuries". According to the reporter Claudio Tognolli, he was shot over 30 times and died two days later and the kidnappers were negotiating the delivery of his body over a payment of US$1 million with a local NGO, but this version is contested.
9 February 2005		Unnamed Chinese-Filipino boy	Dennis Roldan and two other individuals	Pasig, Philippines	3	Rescued	A three-year-old toddler kidnapped for ransom in Pasig on 9 February. The child was rescued on 20 February.
24 February 2005		Jessica Lunsford	John Couey	(United States) Homosassa, Florida, U.S.	9	Murdered	Lunsford was abducted from her home in the early morning. Believed to have been held captive over the weekend, she was raped and later murdered by 46-year-old Couey, who lived nearby. The media covered the investigation and trial of her killer extensively. On 24 August 2007, a judge in Inverness, Florida sentenced Couey, a convicted sex offender, to death for the kidnapping, sexual battering, and first-degree murder of Lunsford. However, Couey died of natural causes in 2009, before his sentence could be carried out.
28 February 2005		Lisa Dorrian	Loyalist Volunteer Force (suspected)	Ballyhalbert, Northern Ireland	25	Unknown (officially considered "missing, presumed dead")	Dorrian was abducted after a party at a caravan park in Ballyhalbert. Dorrian's whereabouts are still unknown.
24 March 2005		Jetseta Gage	Roger Bentley	(United States) Iowa, U.S.	10	Murdered	Gage was murdered by convicted sex offender Roger Bentley, who ingratiated himself with her family. Bentley was later sentenced to two consecutive mandatory sentences of life in prison without parole; his brother James Bentley was later convicted of other child sexual offenses relating to Gage and also sentenced to life in prison without parole.
6 April 2005		Emma Caldwell	Iain Packer	Govanhill, Scotland	27	Murdered	Emma Caldwell disappeared in April 2005. The following month she was found garrotted to death in Limefield Woods. Serial rapist Iain Packer was jailed for her murder 19 years later after one of the longest-running murder investigations in Scottish history.
6 May 2005		Mary-Ann Leneghan	Six men	Reading, England	16	Murdered	Leneghan and a friend were kidnapped from Prospect Park by six men who drugged, tortured and raped both of them. Leneghan was killed and her body found the next day, while her friend survived despite being shot in the head.
6 May 2005		Unnamed friend of Leneghan	Six men	Reading, England	18	Escaped	Leneghan and a friend were kidnapped from Prospect Park by six men who drugged, tortured and raped both of them. Leneghan was killed and her body found the next day, while her friend survived despite being shot in the head.
16 May 2005		Shasta Groene	Joseph Edward Duncan	(United States) Coeur d'Alene, Idaho, U.S.	8	Rescued	Siblings Shasta and Dylan Groene were abducted by serial killer Joseph Duncan after he murdered their family and driven to a campsite in the woods, where they were tortured and sexually abused over a period of six weeks. Duncan ultimately killed Dylan with a sawn-off shotgun, but kept Shasta alive until he was spotted taking her to Denny's on 2 July, at which point police arrested Duncan and recovered Shasta.
16 May 2005		Dylan Groene	Joseph Edward Duncan	(United States) Coeur d'Alene, Idaho, U.S.	9	Murdered	Siblings Shasta and Dylan Groene were abducted by serial killer Joseph Duncan after he murdered their family and driven to a campsite in the woods, where they were tortured and sexually abused over a period of six weeks. Duncan ultimately killed Dylan with a sawn-off shotgun, but kept Shasta alive until he was spotted taking her to Denny's on 2 July, at which point police arrested Duncan and recovered Shasta.
18 May 2005		Rahul Raju	Unknown	Alappuzha, Kerala, India	7	Unknown	The local police and the CBI have not found any tangible evidence for Raju's whereabouts.
29 May 2005		Jennifer Holliday	Eric Parnell	(United States) Lufkin, Texas, U.S.	27	Rescued	Parnell, who was psychotic, stalked Holliday and her cousin Ana Franklin after encountering them at a convenience store. He eventually rammed their car off the road, murdered Franklin and abducted Holliday before sexually assaulting her at gunpoint. Afterwards, Holliday took advantage of Parnell's mental illness to convince him that he saved her from an attacker and manipulated him into letting her call 911, allowing police to rescue her and arrest Parnell.
3 July 2005		Ihab el-Sherif	AQI militants	Baghdad, Iraq	51	Murdered	Egyptian ambassador to Iraq who was abducted by Islamist militants on 3 July 2005, while he was buying a newspaper in Baghdad. Four days later, a video was posted on the internet in which el-Sherif's captors claimed that he had been killed for having ties with Israel, and his death was later confirmed by the Egyptian government.
12 September 2005		Claudia Melchers	Unknown	Amsterdam, Netherlands	36	Released	A group of armed men broke into Melchers' house, tying up her husband and children before taking her with them. The motive is unknown, although it is suspected that it was done to demand a large ransom, as her father Hans Melchers was one of the richest citizens of the Netherlands.
5 September 2005		Taylor Behl	Benjamin Fawley	(United States) Richmond, Virginia, U.S.	17	Murdered	Behl, a Virginia Commonwealth University freshman, was found dead on 5 October 2005, in Mathews County, Virginia, after going missing a month earlier.
October 2005		Ezequiel Elizalde	Florence Cassez	Mexico	11	Released	Valladares was kidnapped along with her son Cristián. They and Elizalde were freed on 9 December. Cassez, a French woman who was allegedly part of the kidnapping gang Los Zodíacos, was convicted and given a 61-year sentence for the abduction.
19 October 2005		Cristina Rios Valladares	Florence Cassez	Mexico	Unknown	Released	Valladares was kidnapped along with her son Cristián. They and Elizalde were freed on 9 December. Cassez, a French woman who was allegedly part of the kidnapping gang Los Zodíacos, was convicted and given a 61-year sentence for the abduction.
19 October 2005		Cristián Hilario Ramírez Ríos	Florence Cassez	Mexico	11	Released	Valladares was kidnapped along with her son Cristián. They and Elizalde were freed on 9 December. Cassez, a French woman who was allegedly part of the kidnapping gang Los Zodíacos, was convicted and given a 61-year sentence for the abduction.
19 October 2005		Rory Carroll	unknown	Baghdad, Iraq	33	Released	Irish journalist and reporter who was abducted by an unknown group after interviewing a victim of Saddam Hussein's regime. Following lobbying from several organizations and both the Irish and Iraqi governments, he was released unharmed the next day.
7 November 2005		Martin Conlon	Real Irish Republican Army	Armagh, Northern Ireland	35	Murdered	Martin "Golfball" Conlon was an ex-member of the Provisional Irish Republican Army who joined the Real IRA after the PIRA laid down its arms. Conlon was abducted at a friends house in Armagh. He was taken to Keady and shot three times, and his body was dumped on Farnaloy Road. It is believed he was killed by Real IRA members after Conlon and several other members had a falling out.
22 November 2005		Airi Kinoshita	José Manuel Torres Yake	Hiroshima, Japan	7	Murdered	Airi Kinoshita was a young Japanese girl who was kidnapped in Hiroshima on 22 November 2005 and found dead later that day after being killed.
28 December 2005		Kate Burton	Seven kidnappers	Rafah, Gaza Strip, Palestine	25	Released	Kate Burton, a 25-year-old English aid worker, was kidnapped along with her parents, 73-year-old Hugh Burton and 55-year-old Win Burton, from the town of Rafah in the Gaza Strip on 28 December 2005. Seven kidnappers, armed with automatic rifles, pulled over the car occupied by the Burtons, then bundled them into a white vehicle. All three hostages were released on 30 December without ransom.
28 December 2005		Hugh Burton	Seven kidnappers	Rafah, Gaza Strip, Palestine	73	Released	Kate Burton, a 25-year-old English aid worker, was kidnapped along with her parents, 73-year-old Hugh Burton and 55-year-old Win Burton, from the town of Rafah in the Gaza Strip on 28 December 2005. Seven kidnappers, armed with automatic rifles, pulled over the car occupied by the Burtons, then bundled them into a white vehicle. All three hostages were released on 30 December without ransom.
28 December 2005		Win Burton	Seven kidnappers	Rafah, Gaza Strip, Palestine	55	Released	Kate Burton, a 25-year-old English aid worker, was kidnapped along with her parents, 73-year-old Hugh Burton and 55-year-old Win Burton, from the town of Rafah in the Gaza Strip on 28 December 2005. Seven kidnappers, armed with automatic rifles, pulled over the car occupied by the Burtons, then bundled them into a white vehicle. All three hostages were released on 30 December without ransom.

== 2006 ==
Date	Victim(s)	Abductor(s)	Location	Age of victim(s)	Outcome	Notes
14 January 2006	Chee Gaik Yap	Shahril Jaafar	Kedah, Malaysia	24	Murdered	A graduate of Universiti Utara Malaysia who was abducted while jogging with her sister, raped, and murdered. Chee's body was found nine hours later with multiple stab wounds. The killer, Shahril Jaafar, whose father was a Datuk businessman, fled the country in 2009 for three years before he was arrested upon his return from Australia in 2012. Shahril was found guilty and sentenced to death in 2015, and he remains on death row as of 2024.
21 January 2006	Ilan Halimi	"Gang of Barbarians"	Paris, France	23	Murdered	Moroccan Jewish teenager abducted by an anti-semitic gang of North African immigrants calling themselves the "Gang of Barbarians" who tortured him and demanded a ransom of 450,000 euros from his parents. When the ransom was not paid, Halimi was dumped by the road and left to die from his injuries.
23 February 2006	Jason Faddoul	Twenty people arrested, including Lennon Gandica (material author)	Caracas, Venezuela	12	Murdered	The Faddoul brothers were three Venezuelan sons of a Canadian-Lebanese businessman who were kidnapped along with their driver Miguel Rivas. Their murder caused nationwide outrage and mass protests occurred in Caracas against insecurity in the country.
23 February 2006	Kevin Faddoul	Twenty people arrested, including Lennon Gandica (material author)	Caracas, Venezuela	13	Murdered	The Faddoul brothers were three Venezuelan sons of a Canadian-Lebanese businessman who were kidnapped along with their driver Miguel Rivas. Their murder caused nationwide outrage and mass protests occurred in Caracas against insecurity in the country.
23 February 2006	John Bryan Faddoul	Twenty people arrested, including Lennon Gandica (material author)	Caracas, Venezuela	17	Murdered	The Faddoul brothers were three Venezuelan sons of a Canadian-Lebanese businessman who were kidnapped along with their driver Miguel Rivas. Their murder caused nationwide outrage and mass protests occurred in Caracas against insecurity in the country.
23 February 2006	Miguel Rivas	Twenty people arrested, including Lennon Gandica (material author)	Caracas, Venezuela	30	Murdered	The Faddoul brothers were three Venezuelan sons of a Canadian-Lebanese businessman who were kidnapped along with their driver Miguel Rivas. Their murder caused nationwide outrage and mass protests occurred in Caracas against insecurity in the country.
2 March 2006	Tommaso Onofri	Mario Alessi, Antonella Conserva, Salvatore Raimondi	Parma, Italy	1	Murdered	A toddler was kidnapped for ransom but murdered soon after the abduction.
16 June 2006	Kristian Menchaca	Mujahideen Shura Council	Baghdad Governorate, Iraq	23	Murdered	Two American soldiers taken captive during an attack on a U.S. military checkpoint during military operations in Iraq. Their bodies were recovered three days later, revealing they were tortured to death by their captors, and a video released by the Mujahideen Shura Council showed their bodies being mutilated and burnt, claiming the murders were retaliation for the Mahmudiyah rape and killings three months earlier. One abductor was sentenced to death for the murders in 2008.
16 June 2006	Thomas L. Tucker	Mujahideen Shura Council	Baghdad Governorate, Iraq	25	Murdered	Two American soldiers taken captive during an attack on a U.S. military checkpoint during military operations in Iraq. Their bodies were recovered three days later, revealing they were tortured to death by their captors, and a video released by the Mujahideen Shura Council showed their bodies being mutilated and burnt, claiming the murders were retaliation for the Mahmudiyah rape and killings three months earlier. One abductor was sentenced to death for the murders in 2008.
20 June 2006	Frauke Liebs	Unknown	Paderborn, Germany	21	Murdered	Frauke Liebs disappeared on 20 June on her way home from a pub. Until 27 June, she texted and phoned her housemate several times claiming to come home soon, but evaded questions. During her last call on 27 June, Frauke is said to have answered the question of whether she was being held captive with a faint "yes", immediately followed by a loud "no". Contact broke off after this phone call. A hunter discovered her skeletonized body in a forest by Lichtenau on 4 October. Due to the advanced state of decomposition, the time and cause of Liebs' death could not be determined.
26 June 2006	Sherlyn Cadapan	Filipino military	Hagonoy, Bulacan, Philippines	29	Unknown	Student activists Cadapan and Empeño were kidnapped by the Filipino military on suspicion of being members of the Communist Party of the Philippines. Eyewitness Raymond Manalo testified to seeing the two of them being tortured and raped by soldiers under the supervision of General Jovito Palparan. Palparan and two other soldiers were found guilty of kidnapping and unlawful detention in 2018. Cadapan and Empeño remain missing.
26 June 2006	Karen Empeño	Filipino military	Hagonoy, Bulacan, Philippines	22	Unknown	Student activists Cadapan and Empeño were kidnapped by the Filipino military on suspicion of being members of the Communist Party of the Philippines. Eyewitness Raymond Manalo testified to seeing the two of them being tortured and raped by soldiers under the supervision of General Jovito Palparan. Palparan and two other soldiers were found guilty of kidnapping and unlawful detention in 2018. Cadapan and Empeño remain missing.
1 July 2006	Hannah Hawach	Joseph Hawach	Lebanon	5	Returned to custody of mother	Sisters born to a Canadian mother and a Lebanese-Australian father. The sisters resided in Calgary, Alberta, with their mother, Melissa. On 1 July 2006, their father took them on a visit to Australia before informing their mother he had no intention of returning the girls to Canada and fleeing with the children to Lebanon. Following diplomatic disputes between Lebanese, Canadian and Australian authorities, Hawach smuggled her daughters out of Lebanon on 21 December. By February 2007, the Lebanese, Canadian and Australian courts had each recognised Melissa as the legal custodian of her daughters.
1 July 2006	Cedar Hawach	Joseph Hawach	Lebanon	2	Returned to custody of mother	
25 July 2006	Jennifer Moore	Draymond Coleman	(United States) Manhattan, New York, U.S.	18	Murdered	An 18-year-old college student who was abducted, raped and murdered in Manhattan, New York City. 34-year-old Draymond Coleman and 20-year-old Krystal Riordan were charged with murder.
30 July 2006	Zachary Miller	Peter Robert Whitmore	Whitewood, Saskatchewan, Canada	10	Rescued	Abducted, held captive and repeatedly sexually assaulted by convicted pedophile Peter Whitmore. Miller escaped after several days of captivity.
6 September 2006	Elizabeth Shoaf	Vinson Filyaw	(United States) Lugoff, South Carolina, U.S.	14	Escaped	Filyaw abducted Shoaf while disguised as a police officer and imprisoned her in a hand-dug underground bunker for ten days, during which he raped her repeatedly. Shoaf eventually managed to gain Filyaw's trust and send a message to her mother which allowed police to discern her location; when this was revealed on the news, Shoaf convinced Filyaw to run away rather than kill her, allowing her to leave the bunker.
17 September 2006	Coralrose Fullwood	Patrick Dewayne Murphy	(United States) North Port, Florida, U.S.	6	Murdered	Coralrose Fullwood was kidnapped from her Florida home and taken to a house nearby, where she was sexually assaulted. Her body, naked and with signs of asphyxiation and blunt force trauma, was found wrapped in a comforter near a construction site not far from her family home. DNA isolated from under the girl's fingernails indicated a struggle with her attacker Patrick Murphy, who lived about two miles away. Murphy pleaded guilty to Fullwood's murder and was sentenced to life in prison. An informant subsequently notified police of a video recording from the house where Fullwood was killed, and authorities continue to investigate the possibility of other participants in her murder.
18 October 2006	Altantuya Shaariibuu	Abdul Razak Baginda, Azilah Hadri, Sirul Azhar Umar	Puncak Alam, Selangor, Malaysia	28	Murdered	Mongolian former model Altantuya was abducted by Razak Baginda over alleged involvement of persons close to then Deputy Prime Minister Najib Razak. She was either murdered directly by explosives or being shot before blown up in a forested land near Subang Dam in Puncak Alam, by Azilah and Sirul, who were members of Malaysia's Special Actions Unit, the resulting trial and convictions attracting international attention. The exact mastermind of the murder remains unknown, but is widely speculated to be Najib, who has constantly denied relationship with Altantuya.
19 November 2006	Ammar al-Saffar	Several men in police cars and pick-up trucks, some of whom were wearing uniforms	Baghdad, Iraq	50	Unknown but believed to have been murdered	Al-Saffar was the deputy health minister of Iraq. He had lived in exile in Britain for 16 years before returning to his country following the deposition of Saddam Hussein as a result of the 2003 invasion of Iraq. On 19 November 2006 witnesses reported seeing several men, some of whom were wearing uniform, arriving in police cars and pick-up trucks to seize him, and he has not been seen again since. An attempt on his life had previously been made in 2004 and he is believed to have been murdered. He had been working on exposing corruption in the ministry of health and in 2007 another deputy health minister, Hakim al-Zamili, and the former head of security at the health ministry, Brig Gen Hamid al-Shammari, were charged with his murder. However, the trial collapsed.

== 2007 ==
Date	Victim(s)	Abductor(s)	Location	Age of victim(s)	Outcome	Notes
6 January 2007	Channon Christian	Five carjackers	(United States) Knoxville, Tennessee, U.S.	21	Murdered	Couple who were kidnapped by five assailants while driving to a friend's house party, who then proceeded to rape, torture and finally murder them. Each of the participants was convicted and given either long prison terms, life imprisonment without parole or in the ringleader's case, a death sentence.
6 January 2007	Christopher Newsom	Five carjackers	(United States) Knoxville, Tennessee, U.S.	23	Murdered	Couple who were kidnapped by five assailants while driving to a friend's house party, who then proceeded to rape, torture and finally murder them. Each of the participants was convicted and given either long prison terms, life imprisonment without parole or in the ringleader's case, a death sentence.
8 January 2007	William "Ben" Benjamin Ownby	Michael J. Devlin	(United States) St. Louis, Missouri, U.S.	13	Rescued	Ownby was getting off the school bus when he was forced into Michael Devlin's pickup truck. Also in the truck was 15-year-old Shawn Hornbeck, who Devlin kidnapped four years earlier and had been living as his son ever since. The boys lived in Devlin's apartment for a few days, playing computer games and watching TV. A friend of Ownby's described Devlin's vehicle to the police, and his boss recognized it, remembering that Devlin was home sick that day. The man called the police, who went to Devlin's apartment and met Hornbeck, who gave his last name as Wilcox. The officers left, but came back the next day. That time, Devlin admitted to having Ownby.
7 February 2007	João Hélio	Five young males	Oswaldo Cruz, Brazil	6	Murdered	Young boy riding in the back of his parents' car when a group of armed carjackers broke in and stole the vehicle. While attempting to flee, they dragged the body along the pavement, mutilating it horribly. Each carjacker was convicted and given a long prison sentence.
3 May 2007	Madeleine McCann	Christian Brueckner (alleged)	Praia da Luz, Portugal	3	Unknown	McCann, a British girl, disappeared aged almost 4 from her family's holiday apartment. Her parents were out eating at a bar with friends, having left McCann and her two younger siblings alone in the apartment. Brueckner was linked to the crimes when investigators discovered swimsuits. Using information from a cell tower, investigators discovered that on the night Madeleine disappeared a call was made to Brueckner's phone approximately one hour before she went missing. The data linked him to the crime.
2 June 2007	Kelsey Smith	Edwin Roy Hall	(United States) Overland Park, Kansas, U.S.	18	Murdered	Smith was abducted from the parking lot of a Target store and was found strangled to death four days later. Edwin Roy Hall was identified as the killer and pleaded guilty to the crime on 23 July.
28 June 2007	Paige Birgfeld	Lester Ralph Jones	(United States) Grand Junction, Colorado, U.S.	34	Murdered	Birgfeld was kidnapped and later murdered by Lester Jones, a man with a history of domestic abuse. Birgfeld led a double life as an escort and model, and Jones was a frequent client. Her body was discovered in March 2012, and in December 2016, Jones was convicted of her kidnapping and murder.
1 July 2007	Tayseer al-Mashhadani	Alleged agents of the Muqtada as-Sadr militia	Baghdad, Iraq	Unknown	Released	Tayseer al-Mashhadani and eight of her bodyguards were kidnapped by alleged members of the Muqtada as-Sadr on 1 July 2007. She was released two months later on 26 August 2007.
5 July 2007	Margaret Hill	Seven gunmen	Port Harcourt, Nigeria	3	Released	Hill, a British girl, was abducted from a car taking her to school by gunmen who threatened to kill her if her father, who worked as an oil industry consultant, did not agree to switch places with her. She was released three days later on 8 July after rebel forces threatened the abductors.
14 July 2007	Alexandre Robert	Two men	Dubai, United Arab Emirates	15	Released	Alexandre Robert, a 15-year-old French boy living in Dubai, was abducted and gang-raped by two adult men who were not named in the media after accepting a ride home from an acquaintance. The men released Robert after threatening to kill his family if he reported the incident. The Emirati authorities' handling of the case and the sentences handed down to the rapists after their conviction led to criticism and had consequences for diplomatic relations between France and the UAE.
18 August 2007	Adnan Patrawala	Unknown	Mumbai, India	16	Murdered	The son of a businessman, Patrawala was kidnapped for ransom by an unknown abductor, who murdered him the following day after the case began to gain publicity. Five people were accused of the crime, but all were acquitted, with Patrawala's murder remaining unsolved.
20 August 2007	Nurin Jazlin Jazimin	Unknown	Wangsa Maju, Kuala Lumpur, Malaysia	7	Murdered	Jazlin went missing on 20 August 2007, after going to a wet market near her house to buy a hair clip. Her body was found 28 days later, on 17 September, in a gym bag that was left in front of a shop lot in Petaling Jaya, with a cucumber and an eggplant stuffed in her genitals. CCTV footage of her abduction and the abandoning of the bag were obtained but the perpetrators were never identified.
3 November 2007	Rowan Damia Ford	Chris Collings	(United States) Stella, Missouri, U.S.	9	Murdered	Rowan Ford, a 9-year-old girl under the care of her stepfather David Spears, was kidnapped from her home by Spears' friend Collings after a night of heavy drinking. Collings took her to a trailer on his property in Barry County, Missouri, where he raped and strangled her; she was found a week later, naked and bloodied, at the bottom of a sinkhole that opened into a cave in nearby McDonald County. Collings was apprehended and convicted of first-degree murder in 2012 and sentenced to death, while Spears pled guilty to child endangerment and hindering prosecution and was sentenced to 11 years in prison.
8 November 2007	Jodi Christine Parrack	Daniel Furlong	(United States) Constantine, Michigan, U.S.	11	Murdered	Jodi Parrack, a fifth-grader at Riverside Elementary School, was kidnapped off her bicycle beside the home of Furlong, who took her into his garage. He then sexually assaulted her in a boat inside, bound her with zip-ties, and smothered her with a plastic bag. She was later found at a local cemetery. Authorities initially apprehended Raymond McCann, a reserve police officer, after McCann suggested to a search party to survey the cemetery, and he eventually pleaded no contest and was sentenced to a prison term for perjury. However Furlong, a local youth sports coach, was taken into custody after a subsequent attempted abduction and discovery of a "kidnap list" in his home, which aroused suspicion of a possible connection to the disappearance of another local girl, Brittney Beers, and he eventually confessed in 2015 to Parrack's kidnapping and murder after his DNA was found to match samples from the crime scene. Furlong received a sentence of 30-to-60 years in prison, while McCann was exonerated of the crime and his perjury conviction overturned. The case and its eventual resolution were depicted in the episode "Small Town Killer" on the true crime series Scene of the Crime with Tony Harris.
2 December 2007	Sergio Gomez	Unknown	Michoacán, Mexico	34	Murdered	Gomez was a Mexican singer who was the founder and lead vocalist of the group K-Paz de la Sierra. He was kidnapped on 2 December 2007 and murdered the next day.

== 2008 ==
Date	Image	Victim(s)	Abductor(s)	Location	Age of victim(s)	Outcome	Notes
9 January 2008		Sharlinie Mohd Nashar	Unknown	Petaling Jaya, Selangor, Malaysia	4	Unknown	Sharlinie went missing after visiting a playground 200 meters away from her home in Taman Datuk Harun, Petaling Jaya. Her whereabouts remain unknown.
13 January 2008		Mari Luz Cortes	Santiago del Valle	Huelva, Spain	5	Murdered	Cortes left her home in the El Torrejón area of Huelva for a short trip to the local sweets kiosk, where she disappeared. She was found dead.
17 January 2008		Denise Amber Lee	Michael Lee King	(United States) North Port, Florida, U.S.	21	Murdered	Denise Amber Lee was kidnapped on 17 January 2008 from North Port, Florida, and was found dead two days later.
19 February 2008		Shannon Matthews	Michael Donovan and Karen Matthews	Dewsbury, England	9	Rescued	Matthews was abducted and held captive for 24 days by Donovan, the uncle of her mother Karen Matthews' boyfriend. After her rescue by police it was found that Karen had helped plot the kidnapping in an attempt to gain reward money.
4 March 2008		Lauren Burk	Courtney Lockhart	(United States) Auburn, Alabama, U.S.	18	Murdered	Auburn University freshman kidnapped at gunpoint by a recently discharged veteran on a months-long violent crime spree. During the trip, he kidnapped, robbed, stripped her naked and finally shot her in the lung, causing serious injuries from whiich Burk died in the hospital. Lockhart was subsequently convicted and sentenced to death for her murder.
4 March 2008		Carolynne Watson	Julian Buchwald	Boolarra, Victoria, Australia	17	Released	Buchwald abducted his girlfriend, Carolynne Watson, while on a countryside picnic as part of a plot to convince her to marry him. He disguised himself with a balaclava before tying and blindfolding Watson and driving her to the Alpine National Park, where he stripped her naked, untied her and convinced her they were both kidnapped by a satanic cult. The two spent six days hiking naked through woodland before being found. Buchwald was later convicted of kidnapping Watson after the truth was discovered.
7 May - 7 November 2008		Fatimah Saiah	Patrick Salameh	Marseille, France	20	Murdered	Victims of Patrick Salameh, the "Marseille Ripper", who abducted and raped women and murdered those who did not comply with his demands. One victim, Soumia El Kandadi, was released alive and later testified against Salameh, who had shown her the dead body of Iryna Sytnyk after killing her earlier that night.
7 May - 7 November 2008		Iryna Sytnyk	Patrick Salameh	Marseille, France	42	Murdered	Victims of Patrick Salameh, the "Marseille Ripper", who abducted and raped women and murdered those who did not comply with his demands. One victim, Soumia El Kandadi, was released alive and later testified against Salameh, who had shown her the dead body of Iryna Sytnyk after killing her earlier that night.
7 May - 7 November 2008		Soumia El Kandadi	Patrick Salameh	Marseille, France	24	Released	Victims of Patrick Salameh, the "Marseille Ripper", who abducted and raped women and murdered those who did not comply with his demands. One victim, Soumia El Kandadi, was released alive and later testified against Salameh, who had shown her the dead body of Iryna Sytnyk after killing her earlier that night.
7 May - 7 November 2008		Cristina Bahulea	Patrick Salameh	Marseille, France	23	Murdered	Victims of Patrick Salameh, the "Marseille Ripper", who abducted and raped women and murdered those who did not comply with his demands. One victim, Soumia El Kandadi, was released alive and later testified against Salameh, who had shown her the dead body of Iryna Sytnyk after killing her earlier that night.
7 May - 7 November 2008		Zineb Chebout	Patrick Salameh	Marseille, France	28	Murdered	Victims of Patrick Salameh, the "Marseille Ripper", who abducted and raped women and murdered those who did not comply with his demands. One victim, Soumia El Kandadi, was released alive and later testified against Salameh, who had shown her the dead body of Iryna Sytnyk after killing her earlier that night.
25 June 2008		Brooke Bennett	Michael Jacques	(United States) Randolph, Vermont, U.S.	12	Murdered	Brooke Bennett was lured into the home of her uncle Michael Jacques by a teenage acquaintance whom Jacques previously sexually assaulted. Bennett was then kidnapped, drugged, raped, and murdered, and her body buried in a makeshift grave about a mile from Jacques' home. There were initial claims that Bennett was the victim of a fictitious sex ring called "Breckinridge", but Jacques was arrested and subsequently pleaded guilty to the crime, and was sentenced to life in prison without parole.
27 July 2008		Reigh Rockefeller	Christian Gerhartsreiter	(United States) Boston, Massachusetts, U.S.	7	Rescued	Abducted by her father Clark Rockefeller, in actuality German-American con artist Christian Gerhartsreiter, during a supervised visit in Boston in 2007. She was found unharmed at her father's apartment a week later.
28–29 July 2008		Valentin Crémault	Stéphane Moitoriet and Noëlla Hégo	Lagnieu, France	11	Murdered	French boy abducted by a tramp while riding his bicycle, with Moitoriet stabbing him to death that same day. He was convicted and sentenced to life imprisonment, later reduced to 30 years imprisonment.
11 September 2008		Lai Ying Xin	Wong Soon Heng, Teh Kim Hong, Leong Soon Long and Wong Kah Wai	Kulai, Johor, Malaysia	16	Murdered	On 11 September 2008, in Kulai, Johor, Malaysia, 16-year-old schoolgirl Lai Ying Xin was abducted by four youths (three of whom were underaged), who murdered her by strangulation before burning her body to destroy the evidence and extorting a ransom from her family. Lai's abductors were arrested four days later and charged with kidnapping and murdering Lai. In 2011, the ringleader and only adult of the four, Teh Kim Hong, was found guilty of kidnapping and murder and sentenced to death, while two underaged accomplices - Leong Soon Long and Wong Soon Heng - were spared the gallows and detained indefinitely and the final suspect, minor Wong Kah Wai, was acquitted of all charges. Teh, whose appeals were rejected, remained on death row for 13 years before Malaysia repealed the mandatory death penalty and allowed those convicted of murder to face either a death sentence or a jail term of 30 to 40 years. Teh appealed for re-sentencing under the new law, and his death sentence was reduced to 40 years' jail and 17 strokes of the cane.
10 November 2008		David Rohde	Taliban	Afghanistan	41	Escaped	An American journalist kidnapped by the Taliban. He escaped in June 2009.
3 December 2008		Jestina Mukoko	Zimbabwe state agents	Harare, Zimbabwe	unknown	Released	Zimbabwean human rights activist who was detained for alleged "anti-government demonstrations". She was released on bail in March 2009, and the charges dropped in September of that year.
11 December 2008		Na-young	Cho Doo-soon	Ansan, South Korea	8	Rescued	Elementary school student who was kidnapped and assaulted by a repeat sexual offender. The case sparked huge controversy, inspiring the 2013 film Hope.

== 2009 ==
Date	Image	Victim(s)	Abductor(s)	Location	Age of victim(s)	Outcome	Notes
2009		Unnamed woman	Thomas Hartless	(United States) Newark, Ohio, U.S.	Unknown	Released	A woman was kidnapped in 2009 by Thomas Hartless, who committed the Kirkersville shooting eight years later.
9 February 2009		Haleigh Cummings	Unknown	(United States) Satsuma, Florida, U.S.	5	Unknown	Cummings was last seen sleeping in her family's trailer. She was discovered missing. The rear door to the trailer was ajar, and the screen door had been propped open with a cinderblock. The case remains unsolved.
27 March 2009		Sandra Cantu	Melissa Huckaby	(United States) Tracy, California, U.S.	8	Murdered	Several days after Cantu went missing on 6 April, a suitcase was discovered in a pond containing her body. On 10 April 2009, police arrested 28-year-old Melissa Huckaby and charged her with Cantu's kidnapping, rape, and murder.
8 April 2009		Richard Phillips	Somalian pirates	Indian Ocean	53	Rescued	During the Maersk Alabama hijacking, Phillips, the American ship captain, and twenty-three other individuals were held captive for four days by four Somali pirates prior to their rescue by the United States Navy on 12 April.
8 April 2009		23 other hostages	Somalian pirates	Indian Ocean	Various	Rescued	During the Maersk Alabama hijacking, Phillips, the American ship captain, and twenty-three other individuals were held captive for four days by four Somali pirates prior to their rescue by the United States Navy on 12 April.
25 April 2009		Brittanee Drexel	Raymond Moody	(United States) Myrtle Beach, South Carolina, U.S.	17	Murdered	Drexel was kidnapped while walking back to her hotel in Myrtle Beach, where she was staying for spring break. The investigation was hampered when a witness falsely claimed to have seen Drexel being sexually assaulted, killed and fed to alligators in McClellanville. It was eventually proven that she had been killed on the day of her abduction and buried in Georgetown by sex offender Raymond Moody, who pleaded guilty to the crime in 2022.
24 May 2009		Nevaeh Buchanan	Unknown	(United States) Monroe, Michigan, U.S.	5	Murdered	Buchanan went missing from the parking lot of the Charlotte Arms apartment complex. A fisherman discovered her body along the banks of the River Raisin in Raisinville Township on 4 June 2009.
26 June 2009		Lindsey Baum	Unknown	(United States) McCleary, WA, U.S.	10	Murdered	Baum disappeared walking home from a friend's house in the small town of McCleary, 20 miles west of Olympia. Her remains were not found until September 2017, by hunters in remote eastern Washington; positive identification was announced in May 2018.
3 July 2009		Sharon Commins	Janjaweed	Darfur, Sudan	33	Released	Sharon Commins, an aid worker from Clontarf, Dublin, Ireland, and Hilda Kawuki, a Ugandan colleague, were abducted by militia group Janjaweed from a compound run by the GOAL aid agency in north Darfur, Sudan. The two were held hostage from 3 July to 18 October 2009 before they were released following negotiations with local tribal chiefs.
3 July 2009		Hilda Kawuki	Janjaweed	Darfur, Sudan	42	Released	Sharon Commins, an aid worker from Clontarf, Dublin, Ireland, and Hilda Kawuki, a Ugandan colleague, were abducted by militia group Janjaweed from a compound run by the GOAL aid agency in north Darfur, Sudan. The two were held hostage from 3 July to 18 October 2009 before they were released following negotiations with local tribal chiefs.
15 July 2009		Natalya Estemirova	Unknown	Gazi-Yurt, Russia	51	Murdered	Russian human rights activist abducted by a group of unknown persons on 15 July 2009 and subsequently assassinated by her kidnappers, who remain unidentified. Estemirova was found dead on that same day with gunshot wounds to her head and chest.
9 August 2009		Zarema Sadulayeva	Unknown	Grozny, Russia	35	Murdered	Sadulayeva, a Russian children's activist, and her husband Dzhabrailov were kidnapped by gunmen while driving in their car. A day later, the pair were later found shot to death.
9 August 2009		Alik Dzhabrailov	Unknown	Grozny, Russia	32	Murdered	Sadulayeva, a Russian children's activist, and her husband Dzhabrailov were kidnapped by gunmen while driving in their car. A day later, the pair were later found shot to death.
17 October 2009		Dieter Krombach	André Bamberski	Scheidegg, Bavaria, Germany	74	Released	A serial rapist and former physician responsible for the 1982 death of his 14-year-old French stepdaughter Kalinka Bamberski. In 2009, Bamberski's biological father paid three men to abduct Krombach and deliver him to French authorities. He was abducted from his home in Bavaria, beaten, and driven to Mulhouse, France, where he was left chained to a fence near the police station. He was later prosecuted for Bamberski's death by French authorities.
19 October 2009		Somer Thompson	Jarred Harrell	(United States) Orange Park, Florida, U.S.	7	Murdered	7-year-old Somer Thompson was molested and murdered by kidnapper Jarred Harrell in October 2009 as her body was found discarded in a landfill. Thompson's mother, Diena, demanded the kidnapper to be arrested for her child's justice.
31 December 2009		Masego Kgomo	Brian Mangwale	Soshanguve, South Africa	10	Murdered	Masego was kidnapped for a Muti killing by Brian Mangwale. It is believed that she may have been gang raped before being taken to the sangoma.
