= Aleksandar Mandic =

Brazilian entrepreneur and pioneer in the telecommunications field

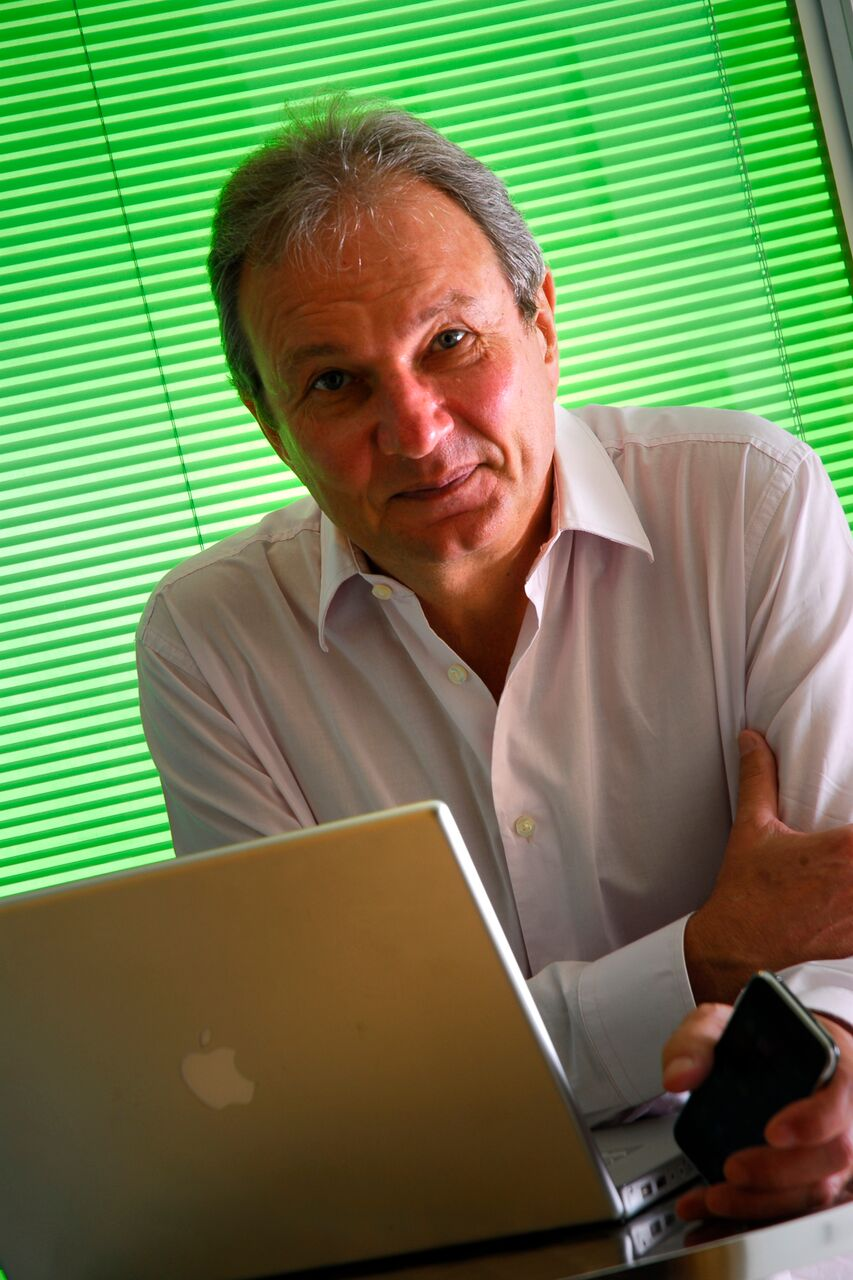
- Website: www.mandicmagic.com.br

Aleksandar Carlos Mandić (São Paulo August 12, 1954 – May 6, 2021) was a Brazilian entrepreneur and a pioneer of the telecommunications industry. He was one of the first executives to commercially develop an Internet service provider business in Brazil.

Mandić founded Brazil's first forum system and its first email service. He was also a co-founder of iG, one of Brazil's early internet portals and service providers.
