= Murder of Mary-Ann Leneghan =

Murder of British teenager in drug- and gang-related circumstances

- Mary-Ann Leneghan

- Murder of Mary-Ann Leneghan (Reading, Berkshire)
- Location: Prospect Park, Reading, Berkshire, United Kingdom
- Date: 7 May 2005 c. 03:00 BST
- Attack type: Stabbing, rape, assault, shooting
- Weapons: Flick knife, firearm (Note: One BBC article described the firearm as an air pistol)
- Injuries: 2
- Victim: Mary-Ann Leneghan (Note: Some sources give Leneghan's forename as "Mary Ann" and her headstone reads "Maryann")
- Perpetrators: Adrian Thomas, Michael Johnson, Joshua Morally, Jamaile Morally, Indrit Krasniqi, Llewellyn Adams
- Motive: Potential retaliation for drugs-related robbery and assault

On the early morning of 7 May 2005, 16-year-old Mary-Ann Leneghan was stabbed to death in Prospect Park in Reading, Berkshire, UK. The previous evening, Leneghan and a friend had been kidnapped and subjected to hours of assault, rape, and drugging in a local hotel. Her friend was shot in the head, but survived.

Six men, four of whom were on probation at the time of the attack, received life sentences for her murder.

== Victims ==
Mary-Ann Leneghan was born on 13 January 1989 to an Irish father and English mother. Her parents separated when Mary-Ann was a child; Mary-Ann and her younger sister were then raised by their mother. Leneghan was a former student of Prospect College, where she showed interest in painting and music, particularly hip hop genres. Leneghan began periods of truancy in September 2004, and reportedly once went missing for a month, staying with friends in East Reading without making contact with her mother. She left Prospect College to pursue a vocational qualification in childcare, but was unemployed at the time of the murder.

The identity of Leneghan's friend is protected by UK law; the Sexual Offences (Amendment) Act 1992 grants lifelong anonymity to people who allege that they have been the victim of rape.

== Incident ==
In early April 2005, Adrian "Redz" Thomas, a drug dealer and violent criminal from Battersea, used a pseudonym to rent a flat on Reading's Oxford Road near Reading West railway station. In mid April, Thomas was the victim of an assault in the flat, and was robbed of money, personal possessions, and drugs. He also sustained knife wounds that required hospital treatment, but did not report the incident to the police. Thomas believed that either Leneghan or her friend, with both of whom he was acquainted, had set him up for the attack. He alleged that the girls had left a door open allowing his attackers access to his property. Around this time, Leneghan's friend's house was the target of an arson attack.

Thomas went back to London and returned to Reading on 6 May with five other men. Between 22:00 and 23:00 BST, 16-year-old Leneghan and her 18-year-old friend were in a third girl's Renault Clio at the disused Wallingford Arms pub when they were kidnapped by Thomas and a group of five other men—Michael Johnson, brothers Joshua and Jamaile Morally, Indrit Krasniqi, and Llewellyn Adams. From the pub, the girls were taken to a Nissan car (Note: Sources differ as to whether the car was a Nissan Almera or a Nissan Primera) parked near the Wickes store on Weldale Street, approximately 200 yards (180 m) from the pub. The Nissan had been purchased by Adams, the gang's driver, in the preceding few days. The girls were forced into the car boot and driven approximately 1 mile (1.6 km) to the Abbey House Hotel, a guesthouse in West Reading. At 01:00 on 7 May, the hotel's night manager let an annexed double room to two men who he recognised and did not see them again. The group's car was parked in the hotel's car park at the rear of the premises, which allowed the rest of the gang and the girls to enter the hotel room without passing the reception desk and night manager.

At the hotel, the girls were raped, drugged, scalded and beaten for several hours. At some point between 03:00 and 05:00, the girls were driven around Reading before they were taken to Prospect Park, some 0.5 miles (0.8 km) west of the hotel. Here, Leneghan was repeatedly stabbed with a flick knife, sustaining 40 wounds including a punctured lung. Pathologist Vesna Djurovic noted that only one of the injuries, a 3-inch-deep (8 cm) neck wound, was fatal. Leneghan's friend was then stabbed before being shot in the head with a home-made bullet; she survived her injuries. After an indeterminate period of time, Leneghan's friend regained consciousness; Leneghan was heard to still be breathing. Her friend made her way to the adjacent Tilehurst Road where she was found by a member of the public who placed a 999 call. The Telegraph reported that Leneghan died approximately 15 minutes before police found her body at 05:30.

== Legal proceedings ==
=== Investigation and arrests ===
Shortly after the murder, Jamaile Morally handed himself in to Tooting Police Station. On 11 May, Thomas was arrested in Birmingham by armed officers from West Midlands Police; by then, five males had been arrested. The night manager at the Abbey House Hotel subsequently provided a positive identification of Thomas during an identity parade. On 12 May, a female was arrested in Sandwell, West Midlands, on suspicion of assisting an offender. The same day, police confirmed that they were investigating links between the murder and the arson attack that was carried out on the home of the 18-year-old girl two weeks before the kidnap.

By 13 May, a total of eight people had been arrested in connection with the murder. Johnson handed himself in to Battersea Police Station on 17 May.

=== Trial ===
The trial of six men accused of involvement in Leneghan's murder began at Reading Crown Court on 13 January 2006. The six men were gang members primarily from Wandsworth. Thomas and the Morally brothers are cousins. The charges against all six men were murder, attempted murder, multiple counts of rape, two counts of kidnapping, and assault occasioning actual bodily harm.

In giving his evidence at the murder trial, Jamaile Morally implied that neither he, his brother, nor Krasniqi went to the park. It was concluded that Jamaile Morally had shot Leneghan's friend, and the friend identified Johnson as Leneghan's killer. On 9 February, Johnson admitted to murder, attempted murder, and kidnap. He had earlier claimed to his social worker, having met with her on 9 May, that when Thomas failed to stab Leneghan he did it instead.

In March, the court heard that four of the defendants—Thomas, Johnson, Jamaile Morally and Krasniqi—were on probation at the time of the incident.

=== Conviction and sentencing ===
On 17 March, Thomas, the Morally brothers and Johnson were convicted of murder, attempted murder, kidnap, assault and rape. Johnson was found guilty of assault and rape, in addition to his earlier guilty pleas. Adams was found guilty of murder, attempted murder and kidnap, but cleared of rape and assault. Krasniqi was found guilty of murder, attempted murder, kidnap, and assault, but cleared of rape. A seventh man was charged with possession of a prohibited weapon.

Sentencing of the six men took place on 28 April. All of them were sentenced to life imprisonment, with minimum terms ranging from 23 to 27 years. The judge, David Penry-Davey, recommended that Krasniqi, who was born in Afghanistan and entered the UK as a Kosovan refugee in the early 2000s, be deported to Kosovo in the event of his release. Shortly after the sentencing, on 3 May, Shadow Home Secretary David Davis MP told Parliament that Krasniqi had been recommended for deportation on his 18th birthday which fell in the two months preceding the murder.

The trial heard how Jamaile Morally's mother disowned him following the incident. After sentencing, Thomas's father also disowned him.

On 7 May 2010, Krasniqi and two other prisoners attacked inmate Radislav Krstić in HM Prison Wakefield in West Yorkshire. Krasniqi was found guilty of wounding with intent to cause grievous bodily harm; the attack was described as a retaliation against Krstić's involvement in the Bosnian genocide. Krasniqi was sentenced to another term of life imprisonment with a minimum term of 12 years.

== Aftermath ==
Following the attack, Leneghan's friend was hospitalised under police guard until her discharge on 1 June 2005. Leneghan's funeral took place on 22 July 2005 at Christ Church in Reading, and she was buried at the town's Henley Road Cemetery. A memorial service was held on the first anniversary of Leneghan's death; Thomas's father read a poem at the service.

A memorial garden was established in Southcote in memory of Leneghan.

== See also ==
- List of kidnappings (2000–2009)
