= Internet Group =

Brazilian internet service provider

Internet Group do Brasil Ltda.
- Current Internet Group do Brasil logo.
- Company type: Subsidiary
- Industry: Online services
- Founded: 2000
- Headquarters: São Paulo, Brazil
- Products: Social networking Online service provider Online media
- Revenue: ▲$149.6 million (2010)
- Net income: ▲$21.7 million (2010)
- Number of employees: 430
- Parent: OnGoing
- Website: ig.com.br

Internet Group do Brasil (iG) is a Brazilian Internet service provider that owns and operates web portals and provides a variety of services, including news, shopping and financial information. iG offered free e-mail accounts until 2016.

At the time it was bought in March 2012, iG was the fifth-largest portal in Brazil, with 23.5 million unique monthly visitors.

== History ==
iG was founded on January 9, 2000, by GP Investments and Banco Opportunity. It gained popularity by offering free dial-up access.

In May 2004, Brasil Telecom (then a subsidiary of Oi since 2009) acquired iG for approximately $100 million. In April 2012, Oi sold iG to Portuguese investment company Ongoing Strategy Investments SGPS SA for an undisclosed sum.

=== Good News Day ===
In 2001, the Brazilian news portal iG was at the center of a case that has since become a subject of journalism courses. At the height of its popularity, when it was one of the most visited portals in Brazil, iG designated September 11, 2001, as a day exclusively dedicated to positive news, diverging from the hard news approach that remains a hallmark of the platform today. At the time, iG was the largest news portal in Brazil.

The idea for "Good News Day" was conceived as a marketing strategy amid an increasing wave of negative news, particularly regarding public safety. Shortly before September 11, Patrícia Abravanel, daughter of TV host Silvio Santos, had been kidnapped. After her release, the mastermind behind the crime, Fernando Dutra Pinto, made a dramatic escape by invading Silvio Santos' mansion.

With the attacks on the World Trade Center in New York, the initiative—chosen on an arbitrary date—had to be abandoned in favor of journalistic newsworthiness. The then-director of journalism at iG, Leão Serva, acknowledging the breach of commitment to readers, wrote an editorial on the same day titled "iG tried, but history did not allow it."

The event was depicted in the short film O Dia da Boa Notícia, which was a semifinalist at the São Paulo Film Festival, directed by Lucas Zacarias and João Paulo Vicente.

== See also ==
- List of internet service providers in Brazil
