= Kidnapping of Sharon Commins and Hilda Kawuki =

2009 hostage crisis in Kutum, Sudan

- Date: 3 July – 18 October 2009
- Location: Kutum, Sudan
- Type: Kidnapping
- Motive: Ransom
- Perpetrator: Janjaweed militia
- Outcome: Released

The kidnapping of Sharon Commins and Hilda Kawuki was an international hostage crisis which lasted from 3 July until 18 October 2009. Sharon Commins, an aid worker from Clontarf, Dublin, Ireland, and Hilda Kawuki, a Ugandan colleague, were abducted from a compound run by the GOAL aid agency in North Darfur, Sudan. They were thought to have been abducted by the Janjaweed.

It was Darfur's longest running kidnap case involving humanitarian workers, lasting for more than one hundred days, and the third kidnapping in the region since March 2009. It also marked the first time any of GOAL's charity workers experienced a kidnapping whilst in action. There had been a concern that a major shootout would end the siege, however the end occurred peacefully. The Irish, Sudanese and Ugandan governments all refused demands for a ransom to be paid.

Commins, an only daughter, was in her thirties at the time of her kidnapping and had worked for GOAL for four years and had been in Darfur for eighteen months previous to her abduction. She was a project manager in Darfur, also wrote reports for the organisation and was previously a press secretary. Commins studied at Dublin City University (DCU), earning a Master's degree in international relations.

Kawuki, a nutritionist in her forties at the time of the kidnapping, had worked for GOAL for just over one year and this had been her first time working for the organisation. She used her learning of the Arabic language to the advantage of herself and Commins throughout their time in captivity.

== Kidnapping ==
“Hilda would talk the hind legs off a donkey and so would I, so we would just keep interrupting each other to talk about ourselves and got through it that way”.

— Sharon Commins explains that herself and Hilda Kawuki engaged in conversation to overcome their fears.

Commins and Kawuki were planning to watch television inside their Kutum compound on the evening of 3 July 2009. Three men entered and ordered them at gunpoint into their vehicle. Computers and mobile phones were also taken. They were transported for a period of a number of hours until they approached the Chad border as their kidnappers repeated, "No problem, this is strictly business".

Commins and Kawuki experienced mock executions during their captivity—"They would make us sit down or force us on our knees [...] with everyone pointing guns at us. They would sometimes shoot a few bullets to frighten us. Each time you’re hoping it is a mock assassination but you don't know", Commins would say after the two women were released. They were held outdoors throughout this time, transported between various locations, lost a lot of weight and were given little food or water. This lack of food and water may have figured in their release.

Their captors paid close attention to media coverage of the incident. The two women were sighted in a village in Darfur on 26 August 2009 when an investigator into reports that they had been married to their captors saw them. Commins spoke to her family just once during her ordeal, in a telephone call dated 10 September 2009. The women were not informed they were to be released until very soon before it happened. Their captors may have escaped across the border into Chad.

The kidnappers made a two million US dollar ransom demand which the Sudanese government refused to pay, saying it would only serve to encourage further kidnappings. Sudanese authorities negotiated with the kidnappers who were members of a nomadic tribe in north Darfur.

Ireland's ambassador to Egypt, Gerry Corr, flew to Sudan immediately when news of the kidnapping first emerged. Irish Minister for Foreign Affairs, Micheál Martin, travelled to Sudan in September 2009, to carry out discussions with Sudanese Government officials in an attempt to secure their release. He also visited the Commins family on a regular basis. The Commins family received a telephone call from Ireland's Department of Foreign Affairs each day at 17:30 during which they would be informed of any progress in the case. They received many Mass cards from wellwishers. They also communicated with a sister of Kawuki.

GOAL's CEO John O'Shea thanked Ireland for its support on the one hundredth day since the kidnapping. He also issued a letter of thanks following the release of the women.

== Release ==
Both aid workers were released on 18 October 2009, following negotiations with local tribal chiefs. They were brought to Khartoum upon their release.

=== Reaction ===
President of Ireland Mary McAleese said: "We are all deeply proud of both of them. Our thoughts are with them and their families now as they seek to recover from the horrendous ordeal they have endured. That ordeal serves as a reminder of the huge scale of the commitment made by Irish aid workers and indeed all aid workers every day as they carry out their noble work on our behalf".

Taoiseach Brian Cowen congratulated each person who had assisted in bringing about the release of Commins and Kawuki, saying he was "absolutely delighted and relieved".

Minister for Foreign Affairs Micheál Martin did not rule out the idea of honouring the aid workers, saying "Humanitarian workers are special people. They bring great honour on our country and certainly we will be looking at that issue. But first things first, we will welcome her [Commins] back warmly".

Abdul Bagi al-Jailani, the Sudanese humanitarian affairs minister, who travelled alongside the women to Khartoum, said: "We are keen to bring them [the kidnappers] to justice and punish them. We will file a criminal case against them. We know them by name, clan and tribe, so they will never escape punishment".

Betty Akech, Ugandan ambassador to Sudan said: “They are criminals and when you are a criminal you must pay for your actions. Whatever action the Sudanese government takes to punish this activity, we will support because it will act like a deterrent to anyone who would like to try something like this again”.

Secretary-General of the United Nations Ban Ki-moon approved the release of Commins and Kawuki, praising in a statement "the thousands of humanitarian personnel working in Sudan for their critical efforts".

== Homecoming ==
Kawuki arrived at Entebbe International Airport on a Kenya Airways flight on 20 October 2009. Betty Aketch was there as were several representatives from GOAL, plus Ireland's ambassador to Uganda, Kevin Kelly. Kawuki was reunited with her mother Anne and four-year-old son Amanu at the airport.

Kawuki spoke of her desperation to be free and see her family even if it was to be her final act, "Even If I had to crawl out of there, see my family for five minutes and then drop dead, that's fine. I'd be happy with that. I had no doubt I was going to get out". She did not reveal further details at this time unlike Commins.

Ireland sent its government jet to Sudan to bring Commins back home. Kevin Myers, writing in the Irish Independent, praised the use of the jet for this purpose, commenting that it had "finally got a deserving passenger". The jet was delayed for some time in Cairo as it was returning. Commins was reunited with her family at Casement Aerodrome in Baldonnel, late on the night of 19 October 2009.

They were led out to meet her by Brigadier General Ralph James.

She held a press conference after spending some time with relatives who appeared to greet her. President of Ireland Mary McAleese welcomed Commins along with her family, department officials and all those who had helped secure her freedom to Áras an Uachtaráin on 22 October 2009.

GOAL CEO John O'Shea was not present. The President said Commins had "lifted the spirits of the nation" and compared her safe return to that of Brian Keenan, the Irish writer who spent four years as a hostage in Beirut in the 1980s and 1990s.

Commins said written accounts of the experiences of Keenan, BBC journalist Alan Johnston and Dave Eggers's What Is the What: The Autobiography of Valentino Achak Deng had helped the two women deal with their situation. Commins expressed her gratitude to Ireland, saying: "I know there were churches all over the country saying prayers for me—Mam and Dad were telling me. Thank you so much for that". A Ceremony of Thanksgiving, which was rethemed following the release of the aid workers, also took place in Sligo where Commins has relatives.

Commins vowed never to return to Darfur.

== Humanitarian award ==
Commins and Kawuki received Hugh O'Flaherty International Humanitarian Award in Killarney, County Kerry, on 7 November 2009. When nominations sent in by the charities GOAL, Trócaire, Médecins Sans Frontières, Plan Ireland, Hope Foundation and Children in Crossfire were examined it was discovered that two thirds of them had chosen the two aid workers.

Tom Arnold, CEO of Concern Worldwide, said:

The first award of the Hugh O'Flaherty International Humanitarian Award would be very fitting way of both recognising their courage and of indicating a much wider solidarity among the broad Irish population for the importance of humanitarian work.

== See also ==
- List of kidnappings (2000–2009)
