= Disappearance of Acacia Bishop =

2005 disappearance in Idaho, U.S.

- Bishop c. 2003
- Born: Acacia Patience Bishop; October 19, 2001; Salt Lake County, Utah
- Disappeared: May 12, 2003 (aged 1); Idaho Falls, Idaho
- Status: Missing for 22 years, 11 months and 8 days
- Height: 2 ft 6 in (76 cm)
- Mother: Casey Lodmell

On May 25, 2003, one-year-old Acacia Patience Bishop was kidnapped from her great-grandmother's Salt Lake City, Utah home by her paranoid schizophrenic grandmother, Kelly Jean Lodmell. Following her abduction, Lodmell is believed to have driven to the Idaho Falls, Idaho area and drowned Bishop in the Snake River the following day, although Bishop's body has never been located.

== Life and prior events ==
Acacia Patience Bishop was born on October 19, 2001. Bishop was previously abducted by Lodmell in 2002; she had hid the child in a basement for over an hour without permission. Lodmell, who was 38 at the time of the abduction, reportedly suffered from paranoid schizophrenia. She was arrested in 1999 for the aggravated assault of a police officer.

== Disappearance ==
At around 6:00 p.m. (MST) on May 25, 2003, Lodmell abducted Bishop from her great-grandmother's house in Salt Lake City, Utah, while on a supervised visit to see the child; Bishop's parents were away at a wedding dance rehearsal. After Bishop's great-grandmother left both alone together in a room, Lodmell escaped the home.

After abducting the child, Lodmell allegedly drove with Bishop to the Idaho Falls, Idaho area, checking into a hotel along the Snake River. The following day, on May 26, Lodmell jumped into the Snake River with Bishop in an attempted murder–suicide. Shortly after jumping in the river, Lodmell was located at a power plant, telling workers that she lost Bishop near the river. Workers at the plant shut down the water intake system and contacted authorities after being informed.

== Aftermath ==
Authorities initially believed that Lodmell had accidentally fallen into the river with Bishop, but it was believed that Bishop was the victim of a suspected murder-suicide attempt. The search for Bishop was initially contained to Salt Lake County, Utah, but later spread to Idaho once it was discovered that Lodmell had traveled to Idaho Falls with the child. Twelve dive teams were dispatched to search for Bishop's body in the Snake River, although the whereabouts of Bishop's body are still unknown as of 2025.

Lodmell was put on trial for Bishop's disappearance and presumed death in 2005, but was found not guilty by reason of insanity. As a result, Lodmell was declared mentally insane and as of 2020 resides in a Texas mental institution. Richard Lambert, an assistant U.S. attorney, stated that "Miss Lodmell was or is a very disturbed individual and a highly dangerous individual".

Bishop's abduction was logged in the National Missing and Unidentified Persons System as case number #MP1863, and in The Doe Network as case number 3686DFUT.

== See also ==
- List of kidnappings (2000–2009)
- List of murdered American children
