= Chohan family murders =

2003 mass murder in England

- Location: Hounslow, London
- Date: 15 February 2003
- Attack type: Mass murder
- Deaths: 5
- Victims: Amarjit Chohan (aged 45); Nancy Chohan (aged 24); Devinder Chohan (aged 18 months); Ravinder Chohan (aged 8 weeks); Charanjit Kaur (aged 51)
- Perpetrators: Kenneth Regan, William Horncy, Peter Rees
- Motive: Financial motive

In 2003 in London, England, five members of an Indian family were kidnapped and murdered by a criminal gang. The millionaire businessman Amarjit Chohan disappeared along with his wife, two baby sons and his mother-in-law. The bodies were initially buried in Devon before they were later dumped in the sea off Poole, Dorset where three of them were eventually discovered in the English Channel. The two children were never found.

Kenneth Regan and William Horncy were given whole life orders for the five murders. Peter Rees was convicted of one. The motive was financial as they planned to take over his freight company to use as a front for importing drugs. The case was highly publicised due to the brutality of the crime. The trial was the longest in the history of the Metropolitan Police.

== Background ==
45-year-old Amarjit (Anil) Chohan was described as a self-made businessman. Born in India, he moved to Britain and lived in Heston, West London with his family. He owned the shipping company CIBA Freight. The company employed 30 people and had an annual turnover of £4.5m. CIBA Freight Services was involved in importing fruit and vegetables. The produce came from Africa, but amid their investigation police suspected that the business was being used to bring the narcotic khat to the UK. After Chohan went missing, he was speculated to have become involved with the London criminal underworld. The company was headquartered in Southall.

Despite his wealth, the family lived in a modest bungalow. In 1996, Chohan had served 18 months of a 3-year sentence for tax evasion, where he reportedly met Kenneth Regan who was also serving time in prison. Chohan lived with his 24-year-old wife Nancy and their two sons; 18-month-old Ravinder Chohan and 8-week-old Devinder Chohan. Nancy's 51-year-old mother Charanjit Kaur worked as a teacher in Punjab. She was a religious Sikh woman. In February 2003, she was visiting from India on holiday to see her daughter and grandchildren.

== Disappearances ==
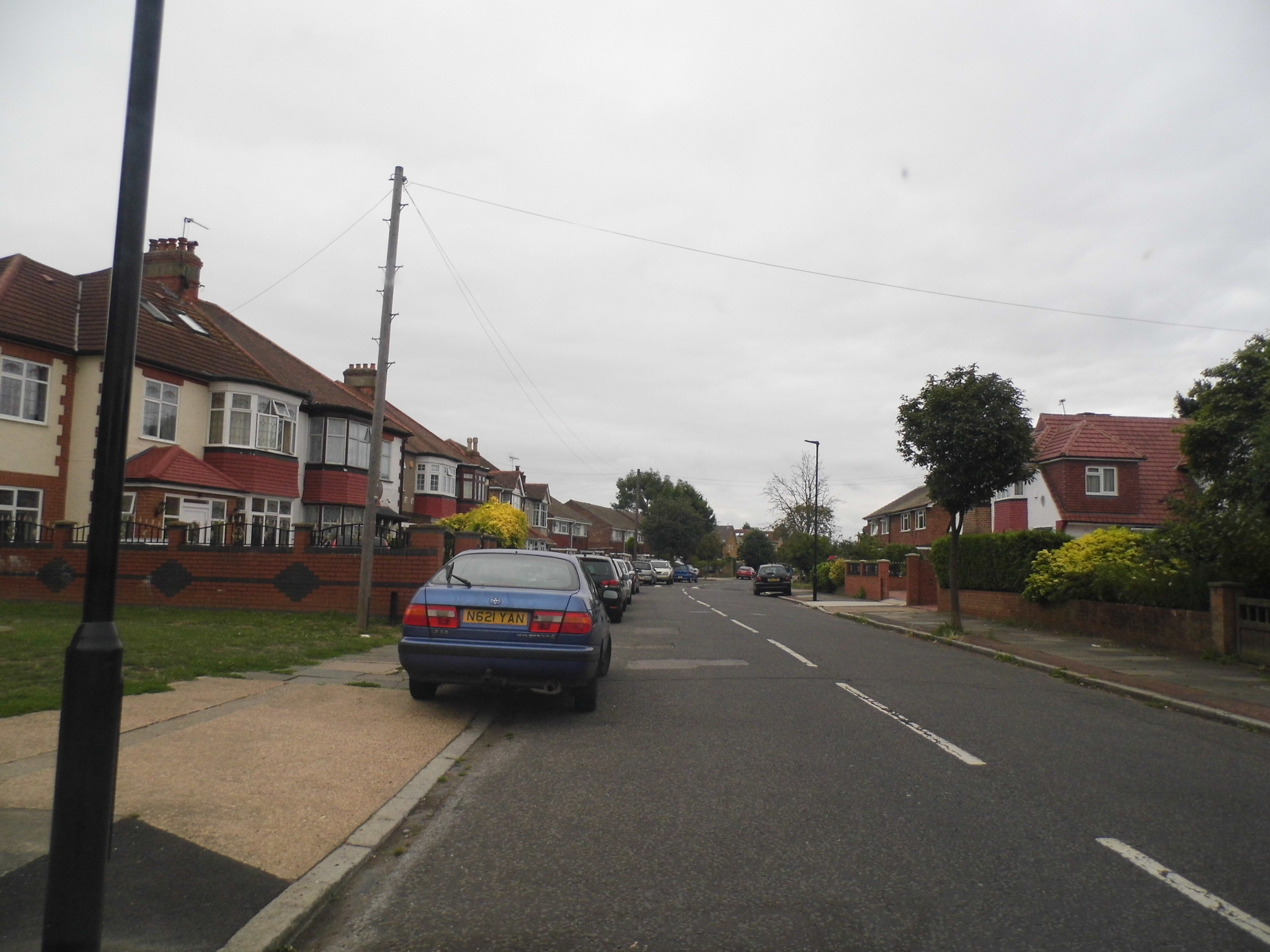
Sutton Road, Heston (in 2013)

On the morning of 13 February 2003, Amarjit Chohan left his office in Hounslow to meet Kenneth Regan at Stonehenge for a supposed business meeting. He told his business-partner Mike Parr that he was meeting with some Dutch men who were interested in buying his business. Chohan was bound, gagged and drugged and forced to record a message for his wife. Later that evening, Mike Parr went to the Chohan family home in Sutton Road after Nancy called him and expressed concern that Amarjit had not come home as expected. Parr told Regan, who arrived soon after and played Nancy the message from Amarjit which comforted her. The following day was the last time Nancy, her mother and the two children were seen. Amarjit was last seen alive on 16 February 2003, in Salisbury. He was reportedly held and tortured over a few days before being killed. The gang had forced him to sign over his company and forced him to write a note saying he was leaving the country due to legal issues.

Nancy Chohan's brother Onkar Verma became concerned when he lost contact with her. Verma lived in New Zealand and talked to his sister on the phone on an almost daily basis. He emailed the Metropolitan Police alerting them of the disappearances. After the family vanished, Verma flew to London and arrived at the family home where he saw nothing had been taken. Laundered clothes had been left in the washing machine, children's toys were strewn about and clothes and suitcases had been left in their wardrobes. One item of notice was Charanjit Kaur's copy of the Guru Granth Sahib, the Sikh holy book, which she would not have left behind. However, further police examinations of the family home revealed that some items of personal belongings had been taken. Verma said "there was no sign of a struggle – it just looked like they had left in a rush". He and the police made a public appeal for information.

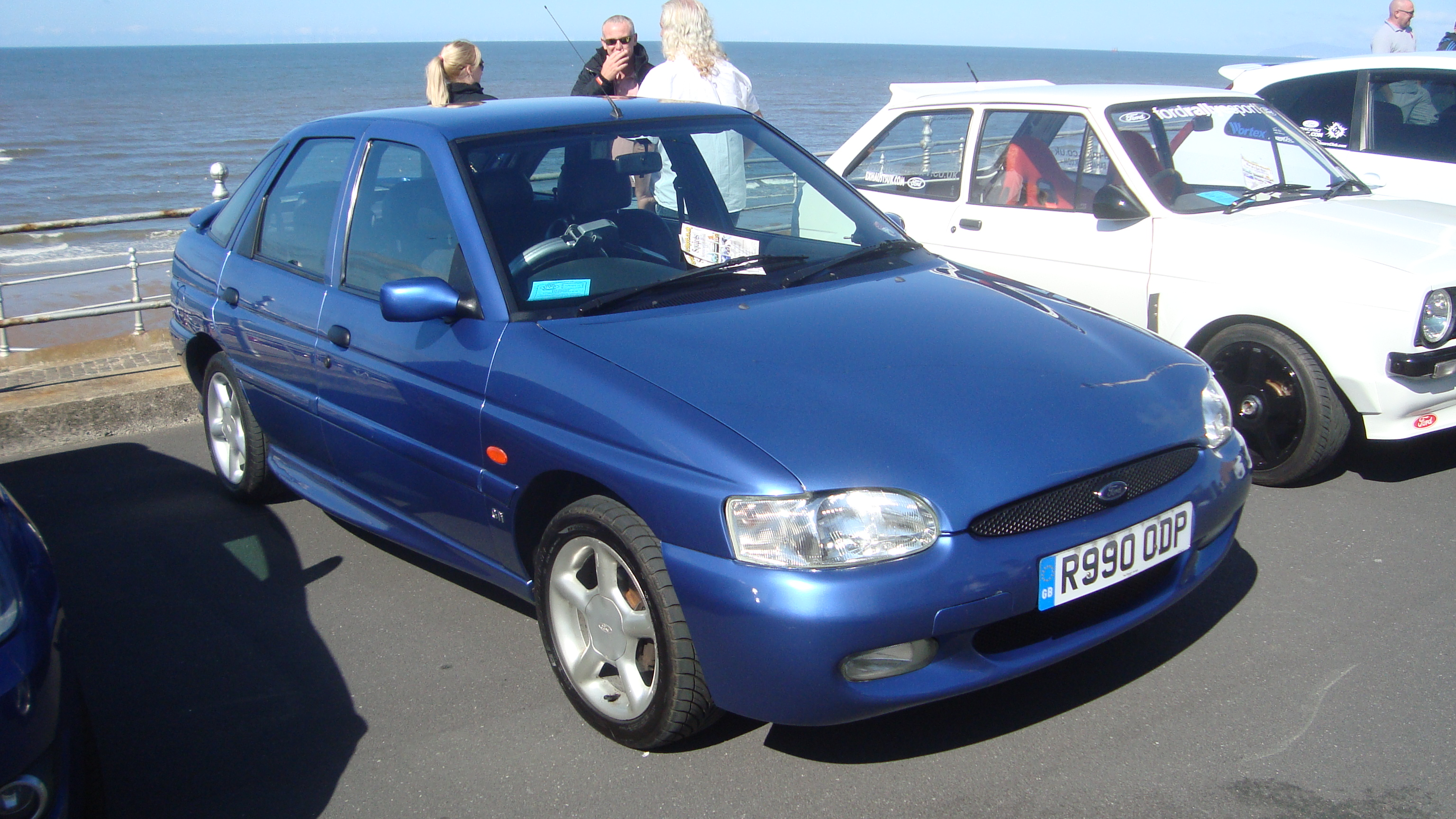
A 1998 Ford Escort similar to the family car which was missing.

The family car, a missing blue Ford Escort, was last seen 80 miles away in Hampshire in the Southampton area on 21 February. It had been involved in a minor road traffic collision at Wangfield Lane in Curbridge on 20 February. The two men in the car at the time of the accident gave false details and were unable to be traced. In the weeks following a small amount of money was withdrawn from their bank accounts.

On 24 March, a letter purporting to be from Amarjit Chohan was sent to his workplace saying that the family were in France and intended to return to India. However, the letter had a postmark from Calais and police found that their passports were being held by the Home Office making international travel impossible. The letter was also suspicious because it was typed on a computer while his were usually always handwritten. Two months later, the family was still missing and the investigation continued. On 5 April, Interpol was notified of the disappearances.

== Investigation ==
=== Discoveries ===
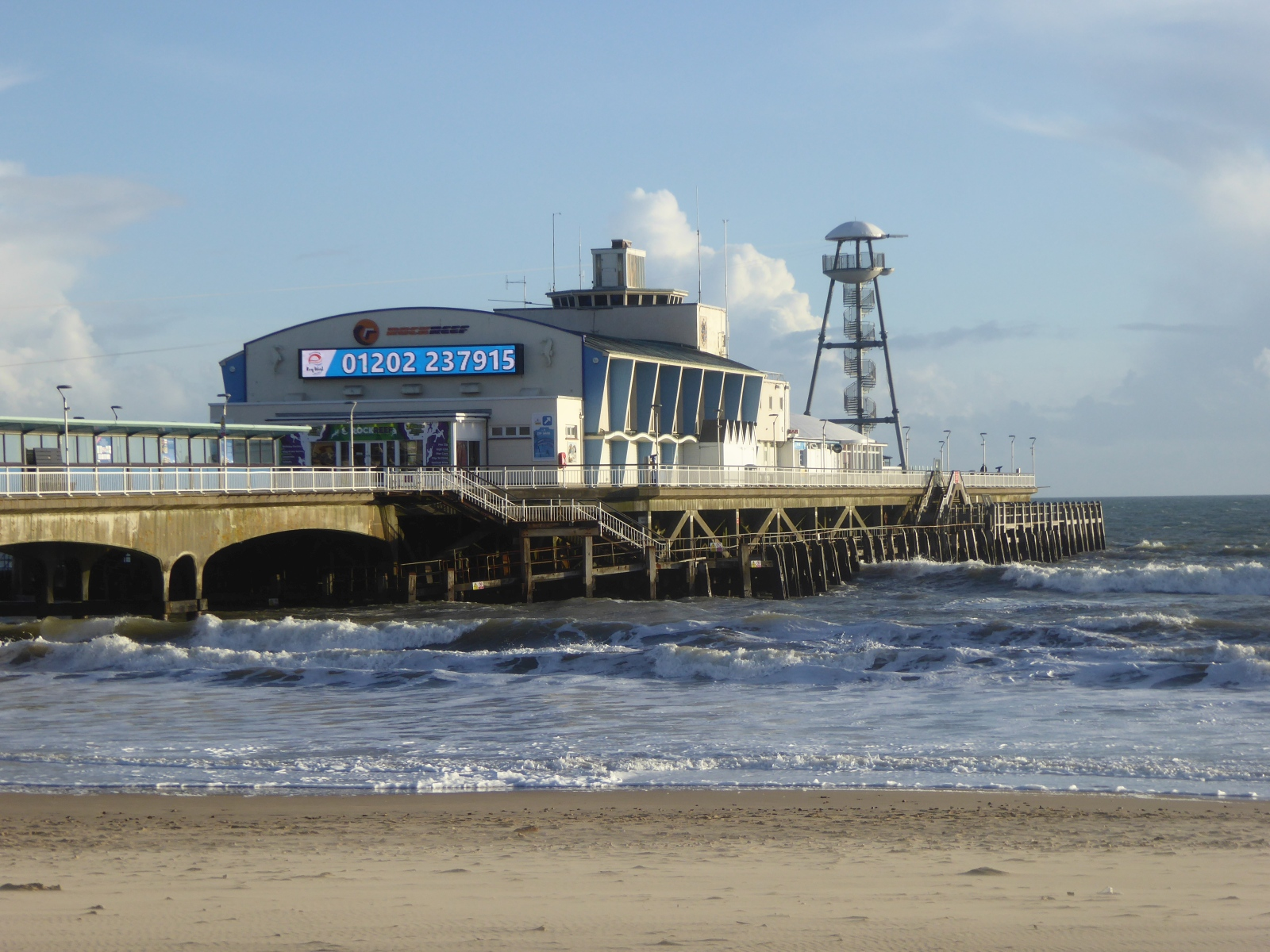
Bournemouth Pier, where the body of Amarjit Chohan was found on 22 April 2003.

The search was greatly helped by the National Missing Persons Helpline (NMPH). On Easter Sunday 2003, the bodies were exhumed and dumped in the sea off Poole, Dorset. The following day Kenneth Regan arranged a meeting in Wales and claimed that Chohan would attend. The location was a statue of a bronze pig in the centre of Newport, and undercover police monitored the site but nobody turned up. Police believed that the pig statue had been chosen by Regan deliberately to mock investigators.

On 22 April, the body of Amarjit Chohan was found in the water off Bournemouth Pier. The discovery was made by David Chapman who was canoeing in the sea with his son Carl. Witness Aaron Buckley remarked that it initially looked like a swimmer in trouble. The man was wearing jeans, black shoes and a purple top. The head and face had been wrapped in brown parcel tape which covered up a large wound to the skull. The body was not positively identified until 1 May. An autopsy was inconclusive regarding how long he was in the sea. The post-mortem found the cause of death was "unascertained but was consistent with asphyxiation". Days after the discovery, a second body was found by a fisherman off the coast of Lymington. A police spokesman said there were no links with the family disappearances.

In early May, police spent five days excavating a field near Stoodleigh, in Devon. This was following a tip-off from farm owner Belinda Brewin. Evidence was found suggesting that bodies had been buried there. Clothing and jewellery belonging to Amarjit Chohan were discovered. However, the rest of the family was not found. Brewin was unaware her land had been used as a mass grave but told police that three men she knew may have been involved. In February, Kenneth Regan dug a drainage ditch opposite her farmhouse. Police believed that the bodies had been buried there before being thrown in the sea. On 15 July 2003, the body of a woman was discovered floating in Poole Bay. It was suspected by police as the body of Nancy Chohan. After DNA analysis this was confirmed. On 16 November 2003, the decomposed body of Charanjit Kaur washed up on the Isle of Wight.

An incriminating piece of evidence was a folded piece of paper found inside one of Amarjit Chohan's socks. Investigators discovered that it was letter addressed to Kenneth Regan and dated 12 February. It was believed that Amarjit had expected to be killed and that he concealed the letter in his sock as a clue to the identity of his killers. The suspects were publicly named by police as they were suspected of fleeing the country. A large-scale search was then launched. It was discovered that Kenneth Regan and William Horncy had left the Port of Dover. They departed for France on 7 May and were thought to be travelling under their aliases. Police also appealed for information regarding any boat used by the three men. Investigators worked with their French counterparts. A third suspect Peter Rees was taken into custody on 14 May. He was questioned over the family disappearance. On 17 May, he was remanded for the murder of Amarjit Chohan.

Scotland Yard embarked on one of the most intense manhunts ever launched. On 2 August 2003, Kenneth Regan was arrested in Belgium. William Horncy, using the alias William Smith, had been last seen on 3 August at a campsite near Durbuy in the Ardennes region. He was later tracked down and extradited to the United Kingdom.

=== Perpetrators ===
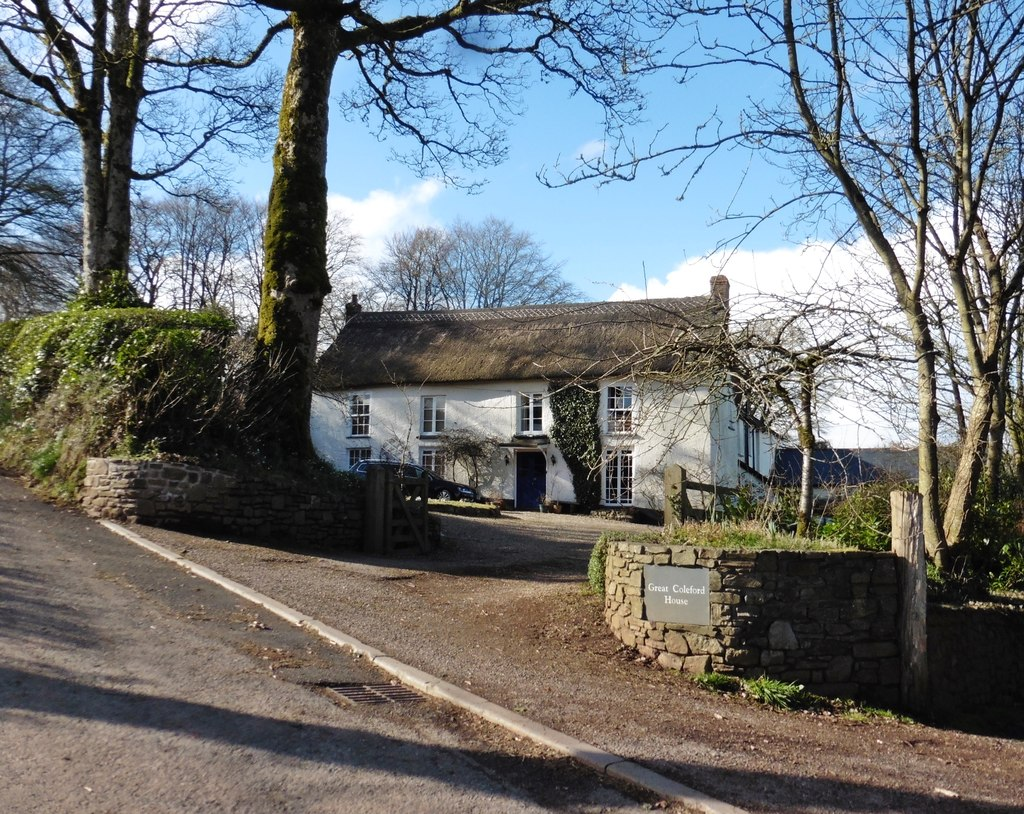
Great Coleford House in Devon. The farm where the bodies were buried before they were moved.

Kenneth Regan was a convicted drug dealer. Also known as Kenneth Avery, he was jailed in 1998 for his involvement in heroin smuggling ring and passport racketeering but was released in the summer of 2002. He was reportedly a "supergrass" who had long worked as a police informant, including in the investigation into the murder of Donald Urquhart. Urquhart was shot dead in January 1993 on Marylebone High Street. Regan, also known as Avery, started working as an HGV driver for Chohan in 2002.

The five bodies were buried in a field near Tiverton on 19 February. On Easter Sunday 2003, the bodies were exhumed from the field at Great Colefield House, Stoodleigh. The 17th century farm where the bodies were buried was owned by Belinda Brewin, a friend of Paula Yates, and a Chelsea socialite. In 1997, Brewin met Regan at a nightclub in London. In 2000, Brewin moved out of London to rural Devon and she and Regan regained contact with each-other. The relationship was exploited by Regan when Brewin was introduced to Amarjit Chohan to impress him. Brewin, who had been described as vulnerable, was unwittingly used in the plot.

William Horncy was from Bournemouth. He previously worked as an accountant and had also lived in Bridport. He was sentenced in 1999 after admitting providing fake identities for international criminals. Peter Douglas Rees lived in Portsmouth, Hampshire. He was originally from Bridport.

== Trial ==
A man appeared at court on 17 May 2003. Murder charges were brought against him. The eight-month trial was the longest murder trial in the history of the Metropolitan Police and the judge spent a record of five weeks to produce a case summary. The trial cost ten million pounds as well as the extra cost of the police investigation. The trial adjourned in 2004. A third man was accused of helping dig the trench. Peter Rees was charged with preventing the lawful and decent burial of a dead body. All three defendants denied the charges.

The Old Bailey heard that Chohan and his family were murdered for his successful business. The prosecution believed the Chohan family had been killed in an effort to take over the family freight business to use for illegal drug shipments. The defence claimed that they had been forced to bury the family by an Asian gang who had killed them. Also the financial motive was scrutinised due to khat being an inexpensive and (until 2014) legal substance in the UK. The prosecution claimed that the five bodies were loaded onto a hired van and driven down to Belinda Brewin's farm near Tiverton. Regan, Horncy and Rees dug a ditch on the property to bury the bodies and then covered the ditch with aggregate. With the fear of the ongoing police investigation a boat was purchased to move the bodies. On 20 April, the three men took the bodies out to sea and dumped them off the coast of Dorset.

On 1 July 2005, Regan and Horncy were convicted of the murders and sentenced to life. The Home Office named them both as having whole life orders, meaning they will never be released. Rees was sentenced to 23 years for the murder of Amarjit Chohan and for assisting an offender. He was also charged with kidnap, false imprisonment, perverting justice and preventing burial. He was cleared of the other four murder charges. Upon sentencing, Judge Stephen Mitchell remarked to the defendants "Your crimes are uniquely terrible... the cold-blooded murders of an eight-week-old baby and an 18-month-old toddler, not to mention the murder of their mother, father and grandmother, provide a chilling insight into the utterly perverted standards by which you have lived your lives... your characters are as despicable as your crimes. Each of you is a practiced, resourceful and manipulative liar".

The causes of death for the family were never properly established. The bodies of the two babies Ravinder and Devinder have never been found.

== Aftermath ==
Belinda Brewin told the court she intended to write an autobiography following the trial. She denied all involvement in the crimes and claimed she had been manipulated by Regan. Regan appealed against his conviction which was rejected. In 2014, Kenneth Regan and William Horncy appealed to the European Court of Human Rights (ECHR) on the case of prisoner voting. This was part of a challenge along with 1,000 prisoners.

The case was covered in a Series 5 episode of the television programme Most Evil Killers.

=== Links to other cases ===
Kenneth Regan and William Horncy are believed to have been involved in the unsolved disappearance of Michael Schallamach. The 53-year-old went missing from the Bitterne area of Southampton in April 1992. In 2016 they were named as suspects. The main similarity between the two cases is a letter sent from France. Police appealed on BBC's Crimewatch Roadshow to identify the writer of a letter and to appeal for information about the disappearance.

== See also ==
- List of major crimes in the United Kingdom
- List of kidnappings (2000–2009)
- List of murder convictions without a body
- List of prisoners with whole life orders
