= Kate Burton (aid worker) =

British aid worker (born 1981)

- Born: 1981 (age 44–45)
- Occupation: Aid worker
- Known for: Being kidnapping along with her parents

Kate Burton (born 1981) is an English aid worker who was kidnapped together with her parents from the town of Rafah in the Gaza Strip on 28 December 2005.

== Background ==
Seven kidnappers, armed with automatic rifles, pulled over the car occupied by Kate Burton and her parents, Hugh and Win Burton, and then bundled them into a white vehicle on 28 December 2005, while she was showing her parents around the Palestinian town of Rafah close to the border with Egypt.

The Palestinian authorities stepped up efforts to find the three persons by setting up road blocks in the area. The militant group al-Aqsa Martyrs' Brigades condemned the kidnappings. There were also public protests in Gaza calling for their release.

Palestinian mediators said on 30 December, that they expected the hostages to be released shortly. Subsequently, all three hostages were released on 30 December, following the release of a video by the kidnappers over the internet. No ransom was paid for the release of the hostages. Kate Burton's brother, Jamie Burton, released a statement on behalf of the family saying that Kate intended to continue working in Gaza.

== See also ==
- List of kidnappings (2000–2009)
