= Murder of Valentin Crémault =

2008 child murder in France

Valentin Crémault was an 11-year-old boy who was murdered by Stéphane Moitoiret, a drifter, on the night of 28–29 July 2008 in Lagnieu, in the département of Ain in eastern France. The case is known in France as the Affaire Moitoiret.

== Perpetrators ==
Stéphane Moitoiret was born on 22 June 1969 in Creil, in the Oise département of northern France. His mother was Chantal Poiret. He left school at 16 to become a baker's apprentice. In 1986, his father died following hallucinations as a result of a brain tumour.

Noëlla Hégo was born on 10 December 1959 in northern France. Her mother was called Jeanne. Noëlla was the youngest of six children. As a child, she was well groomed, sensitive and intelligent. She gained a degree in Accounting, married and worked in Caudry, before moving to Paris with her husband to work at the Bichat–Claude Bernard Hospital. She later divorced and her behaviour changed markedly, becoming a vagrant. In 1987 she met Stéphane Moitoiret in a café in Pont-Sainte-Maxence, north of Paris. The pair drifted from town to town, where they lived on begging for 20 years. In 1991 in Clary, Noëlla gave birth. Her daughter, Delia Gladys Delphine, was taken into care immediately.

== Murder and investigation ==
In August 2006 in Latillé, in the Vienne department of west-central France, Moitoiret and Hégo attempted to abduct a five-year-old boy called Valentin, who was part of a wedding party. A woman spotted them and intervened, bringing their plan to a halt. A few days later, they returned to the location and offered to buy Valentin from his parents. Moitoiret and Hégo were not prosecuted.

On the night of 28–29 July 2008, Moitoiret abducted Valentin Crémault (not the Valentin involved in the Latillé incident above), an 11-year-old boy who was out riding his bicycle in Lagnieu. Moitoiret stabbed Valentin 44 times with a knife.

On 3 August 2008, Moitoiret and Hégo were intercepted by the police in Le Cheylard in the Ardèche, in southern France. They initially denied the crime, but later confessed. Moitoiret claimed that he was overcome by a moment of madness, but psychiatric experts declared him fully responsible for his actions.

A reconstruction of the crime took place on 5 June 2009.

In October 2009, Moitoiret was charged with “premeditated murder, i.e. the murder of a minor aged under 15 years including acts of barbarism”, and Hégo was charged with “failure to prevent the commission of a crime, failing to report a crime and concealing evidence”.

== Trial, verdict and sentencing ==
The trial of Stéphane Moitoiret and Noëlla Hégo began on 5 December 2011 at the Court of Assizes of Ain in Bourg-en-Bresse. Both were found guilty.

Moitoiret was sentenced to life imprisonment, to serve a minimum of 22 years before being able to apply for parole. His sentence was reduced on appeal to 30 years, with the possibility for parole after 20 years. Hégo was convicted of failing to render assistance to a person in danger.
