= Murders of Nireah Johnson and Brandie Coleman =

Murder of an African American transgender woman

Murder of Nireah Johnson
- Date: July 23, 2003
- Location: Indianapolis, Indiana, United States
- Motive: Transmisogyny
- Deaths: Nireah Johnson and Brandie Coleman
- Arrests: Paul Moore (convicted), Curtis Ward, Clarence McGee
- Charges: Murder, criminal confinement, arson, assisting a criminal, obstruction of justice
- Convictions: Paul Moore

Nireah Johnson (1986 – July 23, 2003) was an African American transgender teenager who was murdered in Indianapolis, Indiana alongside her friend, Brandie Coleman. The perpetrator, Paul Moore, killed Johnson after discovering she was transgender.

== Background ==
On June 18, 2003, 17-year-old Nireah Johnson and her 18-year-old friend Brandie Coleman were riding in a car with another friend. They encountered Paul Moore, who was a passenger in a car driven by Curtis Ward. The two groups pulled into a gas station parking lot, where Johnson and Moore exited their vehicles and briefly spoke before exchanging phone numbers.

Moore later told police that he was attracted to Johnson and believed she was a cisgender woman. He claimed that Johnson kissed him on the cheek before they parted and that they had discussed meeting again. However, he denied having seen her again after that initial encounter.

== Murder ==
According to court documents, at approximately 12:51 a.m. on July 23, 2003, Brandie Coleman called Paul Moore's residence to speak with Curtis Ward. Coleman and Nireah Johnson then drove to Moore's apartment, where the four individuals conversed outside before going inside. Ward and Coleman went into Ward's room, while Moore and Johnson went into Moore's room.

Moore later entered Ward's room carrying a Ruger P90 handgun and asked to speak with Ward privately. In the kitchen, Moore asked Ward whether he knew if Johnson was anatomically male or female. They then returned to the living room, where Moore questioned Johnson and Coleman about Johnson's sex assigned at birth.

After approximately forty minutes of discussion, Johnson went to use the bathroom. Moore followed and reportedly discovered that Johnson was a trans woman. Moore became agitated and asked Ward to retrieve some wire. Johnson and Coleman were then bound with the wire, their hands tied behind their backs. Moore placed them in the back seat of their vehicle and instructed Ward to follow him in a separate car.

Moore drove to a wooded area in Fall Creek Corridor Park in Indianapolis, Indiana. After Ward made a U-turn, Moore entered Ward's vehicle and fatally shot both Johnson and Coleman. He then dismantled the handgun and discarded the parts out the car window. The two men returned to Moore's apartment.

Later that day, Moore called Ward and suggested they destroy the vehicle containing the victims’ bodies by setting it on fire. Ward subsequently spoke to Moore's half-brother, Clarence McGee, who had seen the bodies in the vehicle. That night, McGee and Ward returned to the park with a can of gasoline and set the car on fire with the bodies of Johnson and Coleman inside.

== Discovery ==
The bodies of Johnson and Coleman were discovered on the night of July 23, 2003, after firefighters responded to reports of a burning vehicle. The victims were found lying in the back seat of a Jeep. Their bodies were severely burned, making visual identification impossible; investigators were initially unable to determine their race or sex. Police treated the case as a suspected homicide, although the exact cause of death had not yet been confirmed.

On July 24, the Marion County Coroner's Office publicly identified the victims as Nireah Johnson and Brandie Coleman and confirmed that both deaths were homicides. According to the coroner's report, each had been shot in the forehead before the fire was set. Investigators determined that gasoline had been poured into the back seat and ignited.

Authorities were alerted to the victims' identities after Mary Coleman, Brandie Coleman's mother, recognized the vehicle from news coverage, noting the distinctive FedEx license plate on the front. Mary Coleman, an employee of FedEx, contacted a television station, which in turn notified the police.

== Aftermath ==
=== Arrests ===
Paul Moore was arrested on Thursday, July 31, 2003, after Adrian Beverly identified him as the passenger she had seen in Curtis Ward's car on July 18, along with Nireah Johnson and Brandie Coleman. Police were also led to Moore after ballistic testing revealed that the .45 caliber bullets recovered from the victims matched a firearm that had previously been confiscated from Moore during a 2002 disturbance. He was subsequently charged with murder, criminal confinement, and arson.

Curtis Ward was also arrested and charged with criminal confinement, arson, and assisting a criminal.

Clarence McGee, Moore's half-brother, was also arrested in connection with the case.

=== Trial ===
Paul Moore and Clarence McGee went to trial in April 2004. Curtis Ward testified against both Moore and McGee in exchange for reduced charges. Both defendants were found guilty. Moore was convicted of two counts of murder, as well as criminal confinement and arson. McGee was convicted of arson, assisting a criminal, and obstruction of justice.

On May 5, 2004, Judge Robert Altice sentenced Moore to a total of 120 years in prison for the murders of Nireah Johnson and Brandie Coleman. He received two consecutive 55-year sentences for the murders, along with concurrent 10-year sentences for each count of criminal confinement and arson.

McGee was sentenced to 10 years in prison for his role as an accomplice.

In May 2005, Moore's conviction and sentence were upheld on appeal.

== See also ==
- List of people killed for being transgender
