= Disappearance of Rahul Raju =

Missing child in Kerala, India from 2005

Rahul Raju
- Born: 1998, Alappuzha
- Disappeared: 18 May 2005 (age 7); Kerala, India
- Status: Missing for 21 years, 4 months and 8 days

Rahul Raju was a seven-year-old boy from Alappuzha in Kerala, India, who went missing on 18 May 2005, while playing with friends in his neighborhood. The local police that investigated the case could not find any evidence and the case is at present being investigated by the Central Bureau of Investigation, India's premier investigating agency.

== Biography ==
Rahul was seven years old and a second-standard student. He was the son of Raju and Mini. He lived with his mother and grandparents in Alappuzha, while his father worked abroad in Kuwait with an oil multinational corporation. At the time Rahul disappeared, he was the couple's only child.

== Disappearance ==
On 18 May 2005, Rahul was playing with his friends in the neighborhood when he took a break and went to drink water from a public drinking fountain in the corner of the playground. That day, he was wearing shorts, a checked shirt, and a one-sovereign gold chain. He was last seen by friends who witnessed a bearded middle-aged man standing near to Rahul who snatched his cricket bat and threw it to his friends. His friends collected the bat and continued playing. Later, they noticed that Rahul was not playing with them.

== Enquiries ==
The local police questioned many people, including a middle-aged man from the neighborhood who admitted to killing Rahul and throwing his body into a marsh. However, the police have failed to trace the body and the investigation reached nowhere. Later the police found that the person's statements were false and fabricated. The mystery surrounding the disappearance of the boy continues as no tangible evidence was found. CBI questioned different people including his neighbors. In February 2006, the CBI decided to make a neighborhood youth undergo a Narco Analysis test and approached the Chief Judicial Magistrate Court for permission. The court later commented that no special permission is needed to conduct a test. Earlier the alleged person had undergone a polygraph test also, but again there was no affirmative conclusions drawn.

At some point after Rahul's disappearance, a man from Haripad named Krishna Pillai was arrested by Adoor police, for sexually assaulting and murdering a three-year-old girl. Pillai confessed to police that he had killed Rahul and thrown the child's body into a marsh in Alappuzha's Palace Ward. Police could not find the body there, nor any other evidence to substantiate Pillai's confession. Though he was jailed for the murder of the three-year-old, his involvement in Rahul Raju's disappearance was never proven.

In early 2013, the CBI filed a plea before the High Court of Kerala to allow them to close the case as the boy was untraceable. However, the boy's father filed an objection petition against the CBI plea.

On 13 March 2014, the CBI filed the closure report of the case for the fourth time before the court. The CBI, in its report, stated that the boy remains untraceable despite all efforts to trace him.

== Current status ==
The Government of Kerala and the CBI each announced a reward of ₹50,000.0 for information on Rahul's whereabouts. The local police and the CBI have uncovered no evidence as to the nature of Rahul's disappearance. It is widely believed that the boy was kidnapped, but no further information is available as to whether the child is alive or murdered. At least one sighting of the boy, in Mumbai in 2013, was reported to his father, but this was never confirmed.

Rahul's parents stated that they believed he was alive, and that he was kidnapped and taken abroad. When Rahul disappeared, Raju quit his job in Kuwait to come home and stay with his wife. He later found work in Dubai. Three years after Rahul's disappearance, his sister Shivani was born.

In May 2022, Raju was found dead in the family home. He was 55 years old. Police confirmed that the death was a suicide.

== See also ==
- List of kidnappings
- List of people who disappeared mysteriously: post-1970
