= Melissa Hawach =

Canadian woman

Melissa Hawach (née Engdahl) is a Canadian woman who gained international attention following a complicated custody dispute with her former husband, Joseph Hawach, over the couple's two children. The children—who hold citizenship in Canada, Australia and Lebanon—were taken to Lebanon by their father in July 2006 in violation of Canadian custody orders and subsequently retrieved by their mother in December 2006 in defiance of Lebanese law. The ongoing situation has international implications as regards jurisdiction in cases of multinational custody disputes. Hawach released a book about the ordeal titled "Flight of the Dragonfly" in May 2008.

== History ==
Hawach was born in Canada. She moved to Sydney, Australia and while working in a restaurant there, she met and married Lebanese-Australian Joseph "Joe" Hawach who ran a restaurant. The Hawachs later moved to Canada, where Joe opened up a print import business with Melissa's brother Doug. While in Canada, the couple separated, with Melissa receiving custody of the two children.

== Abduction ==
The two girls were living with Hawach in Calgary, Alberta, Canada when, on July 1, 2006, their Lebanese-Australian father took them on a three-week visit to Australia with their mother's consent. Hawach was initially reluctant to allow the trip but later agreed as she wanted the children to have a good relationship with their Australian relatives.

Hawach reported that several weeks into the visit, she received a phone call from Joseph Hawach's younger brother Pierre who was a lawyer, telling her that the children would not be returning. She was later told that Joseph Hawach had taken the girls, five and two, to Lebanon and would only return them to Sydney if Hawach moved to Australia, gave Joseph Hawach full custody and agreed to drop kidnapping charges. Joseph received custody of the children from a Lebanese court, as the country's law automatically awards parental rights to the father unless he is proven unfit. Hawach filed for divorce in Canada and was awarded custody of the children.

== Retrieval ==
Hawach attempted to discern the whereabouts of her children and their father from Joseph Hawach's family through the Australian court system, At the same time she also made contact with several former members of the Australian special forces and New Zealand special forces, who joined her in Lebanon when e-mailed tips provided the information that Joseph Hawach's family did not.

On December 21, having already failed in an effort to retrieve the children through the Lebanon court system, Hawach and the soldiers escorting her took them away from the grounds outside the resort in which they were living with their father. She hid with the children in Lebanon for several weeks before smuggling them out of the country through Syria and Jordan.

== Aftermath ==
Two of the former soldiers involved, Brian Corrigan of Australia and David Pemberton of New Zealand, were arrested in Beirut as they attempted to leave the country. The men denied operating as paid mercenaries in the operation, charges which carry a minimum sentence of three years imprisonment with hard labour and a maximum of 15.

Several months after their arrest, as a Lebanese court recognised Melissa Hawach as the custodian of the children, the charges against the two were reduced to misdemeanors and terms were set for their release on bail.

In February 2007 the Canadian and Australian courts recognised the custody claim of the mother.

There remains an outstanding warrant in Lebanon for her arrest on kidnapping, for which a Lebanese judge has recommended three years of imprisonment. Joseph Hawach's attorney in Lebanon has indicated a willingness to drop charges against the soldiers and the children's mother if the children are returned to his client, an offer Hawach's attorneys have rejected as unreasonable.

Interpol has issued a warrant for Joseph Hawach to be extradited to Canada for the initial abduction. Joseph is also facing a civil suit in Canada over unpaid debts from his print import business. Joseph Hawach is believed to be in hiding in Lebanon.

In March 2007, an attorney representing Hawach told the Supreme Court of New South Wales that Hawach and Joseph had reached a confidential agreement.

In May 2008, Hawach released a book titled "Flight of the Dragonfly" about the ordeal. Around the same time, Hawach has permitted her daughters to contact their father Joseph through letters, photos and webcam chats. The reconnection came with ground rules imposed by Hawach with the guidance of the girls' therapist, which included an apology from Joseph for the abduction.

Hawach has since remarried, as has her ex-husband Joseph. As Joseph "would likely still face arrest on kidnapping charges if he set foot on Canadian soil", Hawach has taken their daughters on two trips to Australia to see their birth father, saying that she believes "believe both parents should be involved in kids’ lives".

== International implications ==
The triple citizenship of the children has contributed to ongoing disputes about proper venue for custody determination, with Australia recognizing Canada's authority as the primary residence of the children as set forth in the International Treaty on Child Abduction. Lebanon does not subscribe to the international treaty and so asserts jurisdictional authority to itself. Canadian Parliamentary member Dan McTeague has cited the case as illustrating Canada's need to secure treaties concerning child custody with other countries. Hawach has become a spokeswoman for The Missing Children Society of Canada in pressing for stricter immigration policies to prevent children being taken into nations that do not recognize the treaty.

== See also ==
- List of kidnappings
