= Kirkersville shooting =

Shooting attack in Ohio, U.S.

- Location: Kirkersville, Ohio
- Date: May 12, 2017 c. 6:30 – c. 10:00 a.m. (EST)
- Attack type: Hostage taking, shootout
- Weapon: Shotgun
- Deaths: 4 (including the perpetrator)
- Perpetrator: Thomas Hartless

On May 12, 2017, a shooting and hostage crisis took place in the village of Kirkersville, Ohio, United States. Three people, including the local police chief, were killed. The events began when Kirkersville Police Chief Steven Eric Disario responded to reports of an armed man, and was shot and killed during a shootout. The gunman, identified as 43-year-old Thomas Hartless, then entered a local nursing home and killed two people before committing suicide.

== Background ==
Kirkersville is a village with a population of 525 at the 2010 census, located 25 miles (40 km) east of Columbus and characterized as quiet. Its police department is small, operates part-time, and consists of only three officers: Chief Steven Eric Disario, a second officer who was on military leave at the time of the shooting, and an auxiliary officer. The department relies on the Licking County Sheriff's Department when its officers are off-duty.

== Events ==
At around 7:45 a.m., Chief Disario responded to a report about a man with a gun, later identified as Thomas Hartless. Arriving at the Pine Kirk Care Center, a local nursing home, Disario spotted Hartless in an alley behind the home, and issued a radio communication that he had spotted the gunman. According to Ohio Attorney General Mike DeWine, before shooting Disario, Hartless had taken two people hostage over an hour before to conceal his presence. Hartless and Disario engaged in a shootout that left Disario fatally wounded, while the two hostages escaped unharmed. Disario was found by responding deputies who pulled him to safety. He later died at a hospital.

After murdering Disario, Hartless entered the nursing home, which had 23 residents inside at the time, and killed two female workers. Police eventually found Hartless dead inside the building, having reportedly committed suicide. They evacuated the home of any residents hiding inside. The situation was declared under control by police by 10:00 a.m.

The nearby Kirkersville Elementary School was put on lockdown as a precaution, with students en route being redirected to Watkins Middle School.

=== Victims ===
Steven Disario was the chief of the part-time Kirkersville Police Department for three weeks, having gotten the job after its previous chief stepped down. He was also a sales worker for a home modeling company, and a father of six with a baby on the way. The deceased nursing home employees were identified as Cindy Krantz, a 48-year-old nurse's aide, mother of five and grandmother of one. Marlina Medrano, the other victim, was a nurse.

Disario and Krantz were both struck by one shotgun blast each, meanwhile Medrano had numerous shotgun and handgun wounds.

== Perpetrator ==
Thomas "Tommy" Hartless was a resident of Utica and had a criminal record in Knox County, located north of Kirkersville; his convictions dated back to 1992. He completed a prison sentence for "domestic violence and criminal damaging/endangering charges." Before that, Hartless spent fifteen months in prison for aggravated assault and aggravated menacing charges, after having initially been charged with kidnapping and felonious assault in 2009 for abducting a woman, reported to be an old girlfriend, in Newark and holding her captive in Coshocton County for hours before releasing her.

According to authorities, Hartless had a relationship with Mendrano. It was reportedly an unhealthy one, and Medrano was listed as one of the people Hartless was forbidden to have contact with during two domestic violence cases between December 2016 and March 2017. Medrano had also obtained three civil protection orders from him, explaining that he was abusing her. The latest order was still active at the time of the shooting. Hartless had domestic violence convictions in 2016 and 2017.

== Reactions ==
Governor John Kasich reacted to the shooting in a Twitter post, expressing the state's mourning of Disario and calling the event "horrific". He ordered flags to be flown at half-mast until May 16. Jay McDonald, president of the Ohio chapter of the Fraternal Order of Police, the largest police union in the U.S., said that the effects of Disario's murder were "felt across the state."
