= Kidnappings of Patrícia Abravanel and Silvio Santos =

2001 kidnappings in São Paulo, Brazil

- Location: São Paulo, Brazil
- Date: August 21 to August 30, 2001
- Attack type: Kidnapping
- Deaths: 2 (police investigators)
- Victims: Patricia Abravanel; Senor Abravanel
- Accused: Fernando Dutra Pinto, Marcelo Batista Santos, Luciana Santos Sousa e Tatiane Pereira

On August 21, 2001, Patricia Abravanel—daughter of Brazilian media mogul and television personality Silvio Santos—was kidnapped in São Paulo; on August 28, Abravanel was released from her captors, and police arrested two suspects: Marcelo Batista Santos and Esdras Dutra Pinto. The two were accomplices of Esdras' brother Fernando Dutra Pinto—who was confronted in a Barueri hotel the next day and killed two officers.

On August 30, Fernando then held Silvio Santos hostage in his mansion in Morumbi for eight hours. After police negotiations assisted by Governor Geraldo Alckmin, Fernando was arrested and detained. On January 2, 2002, Fernando died in prison. On March 11, 2002, Esdra was sentenced to 19 years and six months in prison, while Marcelo, Esdras, and two other accomplices were each sentenced to 15 years.

== History ==
=== Patricia Abravanel's kidnapping ===
TV Globo was forced to break protocol when talking about a case involving someone close to an entrepreneur of a competing broadcaster, SBT. The case made headlines for days on Jornal Nacional, the main news program on the Rio de Janeiro network. Globo itself argued at the time that disclosing the kidnappings was a board decision, having been taken in the 1990s because of the wave of kidnappings that took place in Rio de Janeiro. Like Jornal do Brasil, the broadcaster understood that keeping silent would only benefit criminals.

On SBT, the case affected the broadcaster's programming, which did not show the traditional programs presented by Silvio Santos. The Show do Milhão — the main attraction led by Silvio — and the Tele Sena draw were not shown on the Sunday following Patrícia's kidnapping, on August 26, 2001.

The kidnapping remained for days without major news. The Federal Police even offered to help in the case.

=== Patricia Abravanel's release ===
Patrícia was only released at dawn on the 28th, after paying a ransom of 500,000 reais. The captivity was ten kilometers from his residence. She was placed blindfolded in the front seat of her own car, a blue Passat, and was released on Marginal Pinheiros. Patricia arrived at her house around 2:50 am.

In the afternoon, father and daughter held a press conference on the balcony of the mansion in São Paulo. Evangelical, Patricia spoke in a religious tone and said that she forgave the kidnappers.

I forgive the kidnappers, I don't forgive Brazil's corruption system. This happens because the people are poorly cared for by governments, by corruption. I want God's judgment to come on the corruption system in Brazil, that the Brazilian people deserve to be taken care of.

— Patricia Abravanel

Patrícia spoke to the press in a smiling way and made several religious quotes. She said she had the Bible and one of the kidnappers said, "You are the best person in the world." At the time, the possibility arose that she was suffering from Stockholm Syndrome, a psychological state in which the victim becomes attached to the criminal.

Silvio also spoke about the case. In the interview, he said that Patricia "speaks with her heart" and even joked that "she should ask the kidnappers to stay with her longer".

=== Arrest of kidnappers ===
On August 28, less than 24 hours after Patrícia Abravanel was released, São Paulo police arrested two kidnappers. Marcelo Batista Santos, aged 27 at the time, and Esdras Dutra Pinto, aged 19. Fernando Dutra Pinto, Esdras' brother, and a girlfriend, known as Jenifer, were still being sought. The couple would have the ransom money, about 500,000 reais.

Fernando Dutra Pinto ended up being discovered in a hotel in the commercial center of Alphaville, in the municipality of Barueri. He exchanged fire with police from the 91st Police District, killing two investigators: Marcos Amorim Bezerra and Tamatsu Tamaki. The kidnapper eventually got away.

=== Hostage of Silvio Santos ===
Santos returned to television work as normal; on August 29, Santos spoke about the case, thanking the people who prayed for Patrícia's safety.

On the morning of August 30, Fernando Dutra Pinto reappeared when he invaded the presenter's house, in Morumbi. The woman, daughters and employees managed to leave, while the presenter was surrendered in the mansion with a gun pointed at his head. Silvio stayed in the gymnastics hall and then taken to the kitchen. Civilian and military police surrounded the mansion. The kidnapper did not want to negotiate and even demanded a helicopter for the escape.

The presenter remained for almost eight hours in the hands of the criminal. He was released around 2:40 p.m., joined by Governor of São Paulo Geraldo Alckmin—who assisted in negotiations. Fernando was taken to the Belém Provisional Detention Center, where the other two prisoners were.

The hostage situation was widely covered by Brazil's major television networks, including SBT and its competitors; it was estimated that news coverage was being seen by 3 million viewers in Greater São Paulo alone (accounting for 55% of televisions in the region), with Globo (where Carlos Nascimento first broke the story during its daytime show Mais Você) leading with an average 23 ratings points and peaking at 31, followed by SBT with 10 and Rede Record with 7.

President Fernando Henrique Cardoso praised the actions of the São Paulo police. The agent said that the police acted "efficiently", showing that the corporation is "prepared to face kidnappings like this one". Geraldo Alckmin faced criticism for going to the kidnapping site. However, the governor defended his performance and said he "would do it all over again". Silvio Santos declined interview requests to talk about the case. The presenter testified on September 3, confirming that Fernando Dutra Pinto even asked for a helicopter for the escape.

== Aftermath ==
On September 4, 2001, Luciana dos Santos Souza, known as "Jenifer", the kidnapper's girlfriend, was found in Bom Jesus da Lapa, Bahia. On the 5th, she was taken to São Paulo.

Fernando Dutra Pinto died on January 2, 2002, victim of a cardiac arrest, while he was imprisoned at the CDP in Belém. A conclusive report from the Instituto Médico Legal pointed out that Fernando died from a generalized infection caused by an infected and not properly treated wound on his back. One prisoner's report claims that Fernando was tortured by other inmates.

On March 11, 2002, Esdras Dutra Pinto was sentenced to 19 years and six months in prison. Marcelo Batista Santos, Luciana Santos Sousa and Tatiane Pereira received sentences of 15 years each.
