= List of magazines in Brazil =

In Brazil magazine publishing started in 1812 when the first Brazilian magazine, As Variedades, was established. The market is dominated by national firms. In 2007 there were 3,833 consumer magazines in the country, whereas the number was 3,915 in 2008. The number of B2B magazines was 1,898 in 2007. In 2014 the magazine market in the country was described as one of the higher-growth, larger-scale markets.

In the country the circulation of magazines is audited by the Instituto Verificador de Comunicação (IVC). Brazilian magazines do not enjoy higher levels of circulation.

The following is an incomplete list of current and defunct magazines published in Brazil. They may be published in Portuguese or in other languages.

== A ==
- Ação Games
- Atlantida
- Auto Esporte

== B ==
- Billboard Brasil
- Bundas

== C ==
- Canal Contemporâneo
- Caras
- Careta
- Caros Amigos
- CartaCapital
- Ciência e Cultura
- Ciência Hoje
- Ciência Popular
- Cinearte
- Clima
- Clube do Hardware
- ComCiência
- Contigo!
- Cosmopolitan
- Cultura
- Cultura Política

== E ==
- Ele e Ela
- Época
- Escrever Cinema
- Estética
- Exame

== F ==
- Focus
- Fon-Fon!
- Fundamentos

== G ==
- G Magazine
- Gibi
- Galileu

== I ==
- Info Exame
- ISTOÉ

== K ==
- Klaxon

== L ==
- L'Officiel Brasil
- L'Officiel Hommes Brasil

== M ==
- Manchete
- Minha Casa
- Mundo Estranho

== N ==
- Nintendo World
- Nova Escola

== O ==
- O Cruzeiro
- O Lampião da Esquina
- O Malho
- O Tico-Tico

== P ==
- Pessoa
- Piauí
- Placar
- Playboy
- Problemas

== Q ==
- Quatro Rodas
- Quem

== R ==
- Realidade
- Revista Autismo
- Revista Ferroviária
- Revista da Folha

== S ==
- Salada Paulista
- Senhor
- Sexy
- Status
- Superinteressante

== V ==
- Veja

== See also ==
- List of newspapers in Brazil
