= Kidnapping of João José de Vasconcellos Júnior =

- Part of the Iraq War
- Location: Baiji, about 500 km from Baghdad
- Date: January 19, 2005 – April 6, 2007 (body retrieved)
- Attack type: Kidnapping, murder
- Deaths: João José de Vasconcellos Júnior and two security guards, one English and one Iraqi
- Perpetrators: Jamaat Ansar al-Sunna and the Mujahideen Brigades (alleged)

João José de Vasconcellos Júnior was allegedly kidnapped on 19 January 2005 in an attack that left two security guards dead. Vasconcellos was a civil engineer from Odebrecht reforming a thermal power station in Baiji and was on his way to Baghdad International Airport to return home.

A clear claim for the attack only came on the 22nd, when Al Jazeera published a video allegedly filmed by Jamaat Ansar al-Sunna and the Mujahideen Brigades showing his personal belongings.

Initially, Odebrecht tried to deal with the kidnapping by itself, but after the case became public, Itamaraty stepped in and there was a huge international commotion for the resolution of the case.

The case kept unsolved for three years due to several reasons, including the lack of communication from the kidnappers, that ceased all contact after their broadcast in Al Jazeera, and for the area having become a bombardment target in 2006.

On 4 June 2007, Vasconcellos' body was delivered anonymously to the American Army and later transported to the Brazilian Embassy in Kuwait, where he was recognized by his dental arch. His autopsy determined the cause of death was "several wounds". His body was transferred back to Brazil and he was put to rest in Juiz de Fora on 15 June 2007.

Despite several claims from the actors involved in the investigation they did not know if Vasconcellos was alive or not, according to the reporter Claudio Tognolli, the Brazilian Government and Odebrecht had always known that he was dead. He was supposedly shot over 30 times and died on 21 January 2005 due to his wounds. The kidnappers were trying to negotiate a ransom for the recovery of his body, but the price rose to US$ 1 million after Ronaldo recorded a video during the efforts to investigate the case. Tognolli was then supposedly sent to Iraq on 20 May 2005 by the Brazilian Intelligence Agency to gather biological proof the body was indeed from Vasconcellos before paying the ransom. The Government and family denied his version of the story.

== Context ==
João José de Vasconcellos Júnior (born on 24 February 1955) was a civil engineer of Odebrecht. He lived in Juiz de Fora with his family. He was married to the psychologist Tereza Vasconcellos and had three children; Rodrigo, Tatitana and Gustavo.

Vasconcellos had more than 20 years of experience in the international branch of the company, working in countries such as Argentina, Chile and Uruguay. He had recently denied to work in Equator, preferring to be transferred to Iraq instead. The company was reforming a thermal power station on the outskirts of Baiji. His service was almost done, and he was scheduled to return to Brazil on 20 January 2005. Odebrecht maintained "five or six employees" during the construction work. Vasconcellos told his family that Iraq was as safe as any other country he had worked before.

This is not the first time an Odebrecht employee has been kidnapped. In 1977, the company negotiated with the National Liberation Army the release of the master builder Clóvis Danúbio de Azevedo, who was working in Bogotá. He was successfully released after 170 days.

In 2005, about 200 foreigners were kidnapped in Iraq.

== Kidnapping ==
On 19 January 2005, João José de Vasconcellos Júnior was travelling from Baiji to Baghdad in four vehicles from the security company Janusian Risk Management in order to go to the International Airport to fly back to Miami. Armed men attacked the group about 500 km from Baghdad.

The first news about the attack came via an American Army base in Tikrit. The attackers were said to have killed two security guards, one English and one Iraqui. Odebrecht moved all its employees to Amman and at first avoided citing Vasconcellos' name for security reasons.

On 20 January, Jamaat Ansar al-Sunna said to have perpetrated an attack in Baiji which resulted in the death of an Englishman, but no linkage was made with Vasconcellos' disappearance.

On 22 January, the attack was claimed through a video posted on the internet and streamed by Al Jazeera. The attack was claimed by the Mujahideen Brigades and the Jamaat Ansar al-Sunna. The groups have affirmed they kidnapped Vasconcellos but no image of him was shown. Instead, the video showed his diving card, identity, driver's license and several bills in reais, dollars, euros and Iraqi dinars. The group further said the men killed were English and Brazilian, but the Iraqi Government soon clarified that the latter was an Iraqi man, not Brazilian. Four men appear on the video. One of them reads a message, but the quality of the audio was bad and little could be understood. On the understandable part, nothing was said about a ransom or any other demands.

BBC News has identified the Mujahideen group as the same responsible for kidnapping three Japanese in April 2004 and the French journalist Alexandre Jordanov. Both cases were said to be made against foreigners that collaborated with the United States during the Iraq War. Jamaat Ansar al-Sunna was said to have connections with Al-Qaeda, then led by Osama bin Laden.

== Pressure for a resolution ==
At first, Odebrecht tried to negotiate the resolution by itself. The embassators in Jordan chose to take this approach as at first there were no clear instructions from Itamaraty, the company had a successful experience in negotiating ransom in the past and the involvement of the Ministry could be seen as a political act, as the country recently condemned the Iraq War. The family was instructed of not to give public statements about the case, and the company kept in touch with them to discuss possible outcomes. The case was being held under the supervision of th executive Luiz Teive da Rocha, who works for Odebrecht branch in Miami. He's travelled to London to keep a better contact with the region. Al Dayri, the last Odebrecht employee in Iraq, kept investigating and has talked to the Iraqi Police, the governor of At-Ta'mim Tamer Kojer and the general Mohamed Morsib, but to no avail.

After the release of the video by Al Jazeera, nothing more was said about Vasconcellos. His family and the Arabic community in Brazil began a campaign to pressure the Brazilian and Iraqi Governments for a resolution. Several representatives of the Brazilian Islamic community recorded many videos with the aid of TV Cultura that were broadcast by Al Jazeera and Al Arabiya asking for justice and the release of Vasconcellos. On the first days of the kidnapping, the family unsuccessfully tried to have an audience with the president Luiz Inácio Lula da Silva mediated by Eduardo Suplicy (PT-SP) and the Minister of Communications Hélio Costa, and criticized the government for tanking less action compared to the other countries involved. Ronaldo recorded a video in hope for it to somewhat reach the kidnappers. The video was originally published by Jornal Nacional on 26 of January. Folha de S.Paulo notified that the video was recorded by the request of the president Lula and the same request was made to Pelé, but the government denied its involvement. The kidnapping was notified worldwide by several periodicals, including Le Monde, The New York Times and La República.

A diplomatic delegation led by Affonso Celso Ouro Preto was sent to Amman to negotiate Vasconcello's release. Among the members of the delegation was the representative of the Brazilian Islamic community Ali Mohammed Abdouni. Jordan was chosen as its operation basis as the Brazilian embassy in Iraq was closed in 1990 and diplomatic communications were being kept inside of the embassy in Jordan. The Iraqui nucleus inside the embassy was led at the time by Paulo Jooper.

The delegation arrived on 27 January, and the diplomats entered in contact with several other embassies, including Spain, China, Italy and England, as they all had citizens kidnapped in Iraq in recent years. The delegation demanded a picture of him to be published in the newspaper if he were alive, or a hair sample for DNA testing if he were dead. Itamaraty asked Brazilians not to travel to Iraq while the situation was unsolved. Chancellor Celso Amorim said during the World Economic Forum that he was willing to pay ransom to release Vasconcellos, if needed.

The Brazilian president Luiz Inácio Lula da Silva appealed for the help of the Middle East countries. In a call with Lula, the Syrian president Bashar al-Assad accepted to help find a resolution. The Brazilian delegation affirmed that Jordanian Government had received a confidential information that Vasconcellos was alive, but the spokesperson Asma Khader told BBC News that there were no official information about his status. The Egyptian president Hosni Mubarak and the Jordanian king Abdullah II hosted a meeting about the case at the Sharm al-Sheik resort. Among those who attended the meeting were the Palestine president Mahmoud Abbas and the Israeli prime minister Ariel Sharon. Wilson Lang, president of Confea, asked Adel I. Al-Hadithi, president of the Arab Federation of Engineers for help, and Al-Hadithi replied that he would bring the matter to the Sunni authorities. Religious groups from Lebanon held talks to Iraqi religious entities over the kidnapping.

On 6 April, the Commission of External Relations and National Defense officially joined the efforts for a resolution. The requirement was made by Aroldo Cedraz (PFL-BA).

On 10 May, Vasconcellos' family wrote for the delegations of Saudi Arabia, Bahrain, Qatar, Egypt, the United Arab Emirates, Iraq, Jordan, Kuwait, Lebanon, the Palestinian Authority, Oman, and Syria, present in Brazil for the South America - Arab Countries Summit, for "real and concrete news" about the kidnapping, as more than 100 days have passed without relevant updates.

In January 2006, the Brazilian Government affirmed the investigations were still being held, but the place where his kidnapping was held became a zone of constant bombardments in the previous year.

One year after the kidnapping, his family made manifestations in Juiz de Fora and in front of São Paulo Museum of Modern Art.

== Status of Vasconcelos death ==
=== Rumors and allegations ===
Officially, the last time the kidnappers talked about Vasconcellos was when their video was transmitted by Al Jazeera. But many rumors were spread during the case.

There were rumors that the kidnappers were asking for a ransom of US$ 400 thousand.

On January 2005, the alleged kidnappers affirmed to English reporters that Vasconcellos was killed on the day of the attack. The Brazilian chancellor Celso Amorim avoided commenting about the affirmations. He affirmed that he personally didn't think Vasconcellos was alive, but there was no evidence that he was dead.

On 5 March 2005, the news agency Agenzia Nazionale Stampa Associata affirmed that Vasconcellos was alive. Vasconcelos' family affirmed the information was "too vague" And Celso Amorim asked the kidnappers to give out "concrete information" about him.

In the same month, Itamaraty received his diver's card. Celso Amorim affirmed that it gave them hope that Vasconcellos was still alive, but intel pointed to his death weeks prior during his captivity.

=== Supposed involvement of Claudio Tognolli ===
On the beginning of the case, Mauro Marcelo, General-Director of the Brazilian Intelligence Agency, supposedly called the Jovem Pan News reporter Claudio Tognolli and told him that all the parties involved have known from the very beginning that Vasconcellos have been killed two days after the attack on the 19th. He was shot over 30 times and died from bleeding. The government was at first elusive as it didn't want to be the bearer of bad news for the family. The body initially was negotiated with the non-governmental organization Iraq Institute For Peace for the price of US$ 30 thousand, but after the repercussion made by the video recorded by Ronaldo, the price has gone up to US$ 1 million. According to the magazine Istoé, the government was making an effort to reduce the price of the rescue.

Tognolli was then asked to be part of an unofficial trip to Iraq to retrieve the body, reason being he talked several languages and had experience in covering international news. Mauro has also given anonymous information for Tognolli to publish. Tognolli should go to Al Jazeera to locate the maker of the video published and later talk to the NGO to have biological proof the body was indeed his. Tognolli travelled on 20 May 2005. As he was on a secret, unofficial mission and would not be rescued by the government in case of trouble, he asked beforehand for his friend Marcelo Rubens Paiva, reporter for O Estado de S. Paulo, to make matters public if anything happened to him.

On 4 February 2006, Paiva made the story public, which was then republished by Record News. Shortly afterwards, Tognolli admitted his involvement with the rescue of the body. The story was badly received by both the family and Mauro Marcelo, as it was published shortly before the release of the book Mídia, Máfias e Rock’n Roll, by Editora do Bispo. Tognolli was asked to give evidence to the Comission of External Relations and National Defense. The book was released de facto on 23 May 2007.

== Retrieval of the body ==
On 14 June 2007, Odebrecht confirmed that Vasconcellos' body was found and identified. The confirmation of the body was done in secrecy. The body was delivered anonymously on 4 June and transported by the American Army to the Brazilian embassy in Kwait, where identification tests were made.

Vasconcellos was recognized by his dental arch. He made several dental fillings during his life, which made his identification easier. According to the autopsy, he died due to "several injuries". The exam further says that the body was delivered in a plastic bag containing clay in a process of "semi-mummification", indicating that he was probably buried in a mass grave.

Afterwards, his body was sent to São Paulo, arriving on the 14th. It was transported in a sealed 200 kg sealed urn in a cargo Lufthansa airplane. One day later, it was sent to Juiz de Fora. He was buried at 4 p.m. at Parque da Saudade cemetery. His coffin was covered with the Brazilian flag.

Odebrecht lamented his death and president Lula sent the family a message with his condolences.

== Indemnization ==
After the burial, Odebrecht stopped paying Vasconcellos' salary, as up until then the family was receiving a third of his wages, and tried to reduce their health insurance. The company also denied paying any sort of compensation and didn't help the family with the bureaucracy involved in receiving assistance from the government. The family hired a lawyer to reach a deal with the company. On April 2008, the family reached a deal with the company, but the family affirmed the value was way lower than expected.
