= Gostosa Home Page =

- Website type: Online porn magazine
- Available in: Brazilian Portuguese
- Country of origin: Brazil
- Founder: Rodrigo Coutinho Marques
- Website: http://www.gostosa-rcm.com.br
- Launched: February 1996
- Current status: Defunct since April 2000

Gostosa Home Page, also known as Gostosa-rcm, was a Brazilian online porn magazine created by Rodrigo Coutinho Marques in 1996. The website was deactivated in April 2000 after the publication of a porn montage of Sandy, the 17 year-old member of the duo Sandy & Junior.

== History ==
Gostosa Home Page was created in February 1996 by Rodrigo Coutinho Marques, a member of the Pires Ferreira family. The original website fell, but it was recreated in a new domain on 23 December 1997.

Gostosa Home Page was already reported several times to the Sector of Investigation for High Technology Crimes (SICAT) of the Civil Police of São Paulo due to copyright infringement, but in April 2000 the website entered on evidence after publishing a fake nude from Sandy, that was only 17 at a time. VIP had just elected her as one of the sexiest women of Brazil, but she hefused to pose for the magazine.

The case was investigated by Mauro Marcelo, chief of SICAT. On 28 April, Coutinho was identified and an investigation was opened for defamation and infringement of the Statute of the Child and Adolescent. Editora Abril also announced they would sue Coutinho for copyright infringement. His father affirmed that Gostosa Home Page was hacked, and Coutinho was not responsible for the image. The website was deactivated, but a clone was created by Coutinho fans on an American domain. The new website was quickly taken down.

== Content ==
Gostosa Home Page was an online porn magazine updated monthly on the 15th. It featured nude pictures of famous national and international personalities, including Carolina Dieckmann, Carla Perez, Xuxa Meneghel, Cameron Diaz, Alicia Silverstone, Sharon Stone and others. The pictures were taken from movies, including The Crash, Basic Instinct and Love Strange Love, Globo and Rede Manchete soap operas and miniseries, including Xica da Silva, Labirinto and A Vida Como Ela É, and porn magazines, including Playboy, Sexy, Trip and Ele & Ela. It also featured porn parodies of cartoons, such as Scooby-Doo, The Flintstones, The Little Mermaid and Pocahontas. All the material was posted with disregard of copyright. There were also interviews taken from Bate-Papo do UOL and porn montages of Sandy, Thereza Collor and Angélica. The website also featured porn movies (ClassiSex), a column about love, jokes and a webchat.

== Popularity ==
According to Coutinho, Gostosa Home Page received an average of 10 thousand views per month. In May 2000, the website scored in 3rd on the list of most accessed porn sites from Top 30 Brasil.
