= Mauro Marcelo =

Brazilian police officer (born 1959)

Mauro Marcelo de Lima e Silva
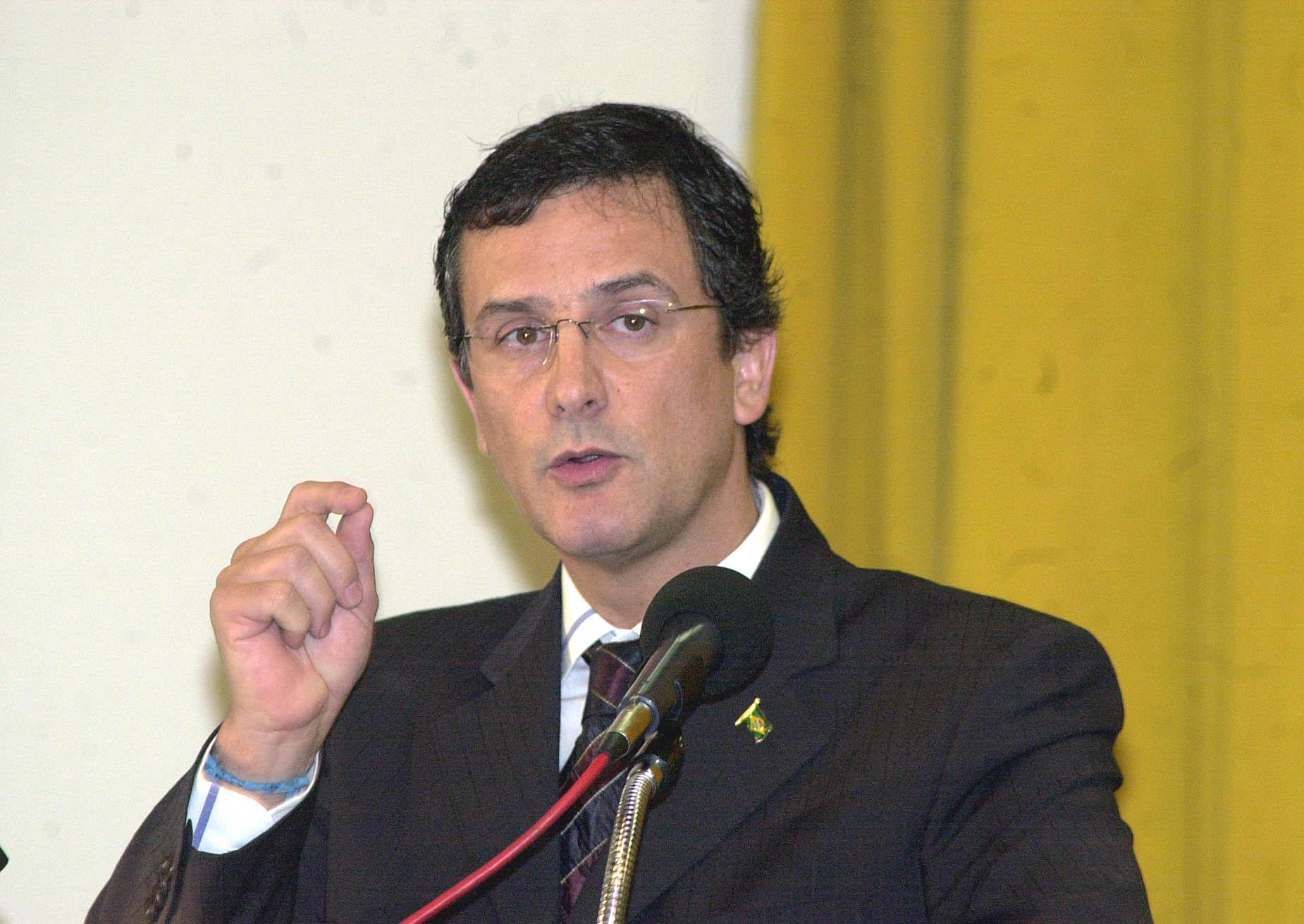
- Mauro Marcelo in his installation ceremony as General-Director of ABIN (13 July 2004)

Rappoteur of Superior Justice Court of Sports
- Incumbent
- Assumed office 2016

President of Sports Justice Court of São Paulo
- In office 2012–2016

General-Director of Agência Brasileira de Inteligência
- In office 13 July 2004 – 13 July 2005
- President: Luiz Inácio Lula da Silva
- Preceded by: Marisa Almeida Del'Isola e Diniz
- Succeeded by: Márcio Paulo Buzanelli

Personal details
- Born: 22 July 1959 (age 67) São Paulo, São Paulo, Brazil
- Spouse: Sylvia Maria Bartoletti
- Children: 3
- Education: Universidade São Francisco; Virginia University of Lynchburg; FBI National Academy; Superior School of War
- Profession: Police Officer from the Civil Police of São Paulo

Mauro Marcelo de Lima e Silva is a Brazilian police officer. Graduated in Law in 1983, he joined the Civil Police of São Paulo one year later. He later was sent to the United States, graduating in Criminal Justice by the Virginia University and in Cybersecurity by the FBI National Academy.

Back in Brazil, he became known for solving cybercrimes. He was responsible for the first arrest for a crime committed via e-mail in Brazil, and several police departments asked for help in similar cases. In 1999, he was chief of the Sector of Investigation for High Technology Crimes (SICAT) of the Civil Police of São Paulo, the first National department responsible for tackling cybercrime. He was notorious for recruiting young hackers to help him out, as computers were just becoming mainstream in Brazil. He was known for solving cases very quickly and worked in many notorious crimes.

On 13 July 2004, he was appointed by the president Luiz Inácio Lula da Silva as the General-Director of the Brazilian Intelligence Agency (ABIN). There, he was known for being more transparent and talking more to the media compared to his predecessors, and he named his gestion as "New ABIN". He suffered resistance from the Army sector for being the first non-military director from the agency. He resigned on 13 July 2005, after calling congressmen as "beasts" for exposing one ABIN agent for clarifications of their investigation against Correios, that resulted in the Correios CPMI.

Mauro then returned for the Civil Police of São Paulo where he partook in several roles, including as Chief of the Intelligence of the Division of Criminal Information in April 2009.

In 2008, he began working for the Sports Justice Court of São Paulo (TJD-SP), where he was elected as president in 2012. In 2016, he left the presidency and became the rapporteur of the Superior Justice Court of Sports (STJD).

== Education ==
Mauro is graduated in law by the Universidade São Francisco in 1983, Criminal Justice by the Virginia University and in cybersecurity by the FBI National Academy. Both his American graduations were concluded in 1993. He was the best student from his class on FBI National Academy.

He is also graduated at the Superior School of War and was the first of his class on Superior Course of Police, thus becoming a special-class Police Delegate. He also made several courses, including from the Police Departments of Miami, New York, Paris and Tokyo.

== Early career ==
Mauro became a police officer in 1984.

After his return to Brazil, Mauro worked at the 89th Police District of the Civil Police of São Paulo in Morumbi, São Paulo.

In 1994, Mauro was invited by the FBI to take part of the security taskforce for the 1994 World Cup.

In the same year, Mauro solved the case of the kidnaping of Roberto Teixeira's nephew. The kid was released from captivity after 11 days without paying the ransom. As Teixeira was friend of Luiz Inácio Lula da Silva, Mauro fell in favor of the future president.

On 26 October 1994, Mauro Marcelo ordered the prison of the engineer Luis Augusto Cerigola for killing his wife, Mariângela Iscolanieri Cerigola, for adultery.

In 1995, Mauro has worked as coordinator for Brazilian branch of Web-Police.

In May 1995, Mauro was contacted by Q-Refres-Ko executives after the private detective Valdir Matias dos Santos tried to extort them in R$14 thousand. Valdir was hired by Philip Morris International for transcribing the phone calls obtained by wiretapping and decided to ask for the money because he received only R$10 to do his job. He was arrested on 3 May and Mauro ordered the case to be conducted with legal confidentiality.

In 1995, Mauro worked in the verification of the phone calls made by illegal cassino owners in the midst of the Parliamentary Inquiry Committee (CPI) of Bingos. He accused three investigators and a cop of helping with the protection of Ivo Noal's jogo do bicho cassinos.

In 1997, Mauro worked for the Police Department for Protection of Authorities, Dignitaries and Consular Representants, from the Civil Police of São Paulo.

On 27 August 1997, Maria Cristina Poli, host of Vitrine from TV Cultura, requested the investigation of the rape threats she was receiving via e-mail. On 29 August, Mauro's taskforce arrested the systems analyst Jair Francisco Pinto, codenamed J.F., under the accusations of threatening and illegal embarrassment. He sent the messages as he was testing a program that omitted the e-mail sender. Poli received almost 200 messages and Barbara Gancia, columnist for Folha de S. Paulo, received 535 e-mails. This was the first arrest in Brazil for a crime committed via e-mail. Jair was sentenced on 18 November to pay a fine and lecture informatics classes for students of the Police Academy (Acadepol). Because of the repercussion, several policemen asked Mauro help to solve similar cases.

In November 1997, Mauro investigated messages sent to the financial market of London by Ricardo Mansur, owner of Mappin, containing the fake news that Bradesco was going to bankrupt. In August, Mansur sued Bradesco for supposedly bankrupt his businesses.

== Cybercrime investigator ==
In 1999, Mauro Marcelo was the first chief from the Sector of Investigation for High Technology Crimes (SICAT) of the Civil Police of São Paulo. SICAT was the first police station for cybercrimes of Brazil. Mauro was known for being very effective in his job, sometimes solving cases in a matter of hours.

In 1999, the Brazilian Football Confederation website was invaded by a hacker from Cascavel nicknamed Alguém (Someone). Instead of prosecuting him, Mauro recruited the 16-year-old boy to help to tackle cybercrime due the lack of personnel on SICAT. Since then, the cooperation between hackers and SICAT became a common procedure. Some of the cases the hackers cooperated were Alguém report against the Organização Hacker Brasileira (Brazilian Hacker Organization), responsible for the invasion of the websites from the Supreme Federal Court and the Military Police of São Paulo State, and the blockage of the website from National Telecommunications Agency, reported by a hacker named Pirata (Pirate). The responsible, Lima e Silva, codenamed Kernel, was also invited to collaborate with the Civil Police of Rio de Janeiro, Espírito Santo and Minas Gerais. In March 2000, the Ministry of Justice created a hacker group, including cooperators of SICAT, to create a legislation against cybercrimes in Brazil.

In April 2000, Mauro investigated the pornographic website Gostosa Home Page for publishing a fake naked picture of Sandy, aged 17. Rodrigo Coutinho Marques was arrested on 28 April for violation of the Statute of the Child and Adolescent. Coutinho was also sued by Editora Abril for copyright infringement for publishing photos of Playboy magazine without permission. Gostosa Home Page was taken down. In June the website was recreated by Coutinho fans on an American domain, but the new website was also quickly taken down.

In May 2000, Mauro investigated death threats sent to Bill Clinton, Hillary Clinton and Chelsea Clinton in the White House website. In April, the FBI discovered the threats were sent from an IP address from Adaptanet, a Brazilian company from Bauru, and sent the case to SICAT. SICAT subsequently contacted the Correio Net internet provider to gather data from the user. Correio Net didn't deliver the data for the lack of court order, and Mauro opened an inquiry against Jefferson Manglio, the company supervisor, for disobedience, but Jefferson entered with an habeas corpus and the 1st Criminal Court of Campinas paralyzed the inquiry. The Court of Appeal cancelled the inquiry but obligated the company to give the necessary data for deeming the court order unnecessary for the case. Mauro was cheered by the White House after solving the crime.

In the same month, Mauro entered with an inquiry to stop the news websites Securenet and Hackernews to publish screenshots from cracker attacks, arguing that they were making the criminals famous. He also entered on Justice to prohibit mirror websites from Securenet and Hackernews to be created.

Mauro also investigated international websites that sold drugs online in the same month. He bought small quantities of weed from eight websites and received the package from three of them. The weed was sent to the Medical Legal Institute for analysis and he declared the Federal Police of Brazil and the Correios were going to be questioned for allowing the drugs to enter in Brazil.

In June 2000 Mauro worked on a case where since 10 May, someone codenamed Tenório Cavalcanti accused the Councilors of Caieiras in the Assembly website of supposed irregularities, such as having ghost employees.

In December 2000, Mauro worked on a case where an apocryphal website was created to attack the Workers' Party, the ex-Governor of Brasília Cristovam Buarque and the director of Correio Braziliense Ricardo Noblat. Mauro discovered the website was maintained by a computer located on the office of the President of the Legislative Assembly of Brasília Edimar Pireneus (PMDB). Subsequently, Pirineus fired his employee, Stanlly Vasconcelos, accused of the crime, and opened two commissions to determine if other people were involved.

On 1 February 2001, the hacker group Insanity Zine Corp. invaded the website from Sex Shop Virtual and posted offenses against Mauro.

On 5 February 2001, the Brazilian hacker group Data Cha0s invaded the main page from the Central Bank of Egypt and posted a message mocking the Federal Police of Brazil and doxing Mauro personal information.

On 21 June 2001, Mauro ordered internet providers to take down a website that exalted the criminal organization Primeiro Comando da Capital (PCC).

Mauro was also member of a series of international initiatives to fight cybercrime, including Police Futurists International, International Association of Chiefs of Police and International Association of Computer Investigative Specialists.

== Brazilian Intelligence Agency ==
Mauro worked in the security of Luiz Inácio Lula da Silva during the 2002 election. He installed anti-wiretap measures in Lula's house after reports that PSDB was spying the candidate. Lula main rival during the elections was José Serra, from PSDB. After being elected, Lula nominated Mauro as General-Director of the Brazilian Intelligence Agency (ABIN). His name was accepted by the Senate on 29 June 2004 and he was officially accepted on 13 July, substituting Marisa Almeida Del'Isola e Diniz. Mauro was the first person from the Civil Police to command ABIN, and nomination was criticized by the Brazilian Army for his ties with the FBI. Mauro not only studied in the FBI National Academy, but also is a declared fan of Edgar Hoover.

When he arrived, ABIN was divided by factions, but he helped them to reach a truce and announced the creation of a career plan. He also announced that his gestion was going to be marked by transparency and change of focus from the agency. During Fernando Henrique Cardoso term, ABIN was marked for combating the MST and PCC. Nonetheless, Mauro has expressed his concerns with conflicts created by social movements. He was also known for communicating extensively with the media. He has also suspended the prohibition of cellphones for the agents, declassified documents that had no reason to be classified, including documents about the Military Dictatorship, invested in national equipment to lessen the dependency in foreign agencies and created an internal journal named Araponga. Mauro insisted in eating with ABIN agents and established the "Birthday Day", where every Friday he invited a couple of agents to drink tea in his office and gave an autographed picture of himself. ABIN was also passing through a personnel and financial crisis. Mauro announced he wanted to make a partnership with the CIA to create a National Academy in Brazil and to graduate ABIN agents by the Joint Military Intelligence College. He further announced his plans to expand ABIN to the Legal Amazon region and the operation in other countries, specially in South America and Southern Africa, including the opening of offices in Colombia, Paraguay and possibly China. Due all the changes made during his term, even though many of them were not completed, Mauro coined the term "New Abin".

On 8 July 2004, the Federal Police launched Operation Santiahaga, that resulted in the prison of 17 people, including the banker Daniel Dantas, for corruption and money laundry. Paulo Lacerda, the General-Director of the Federal Police, allegedly agreed with the participation of a taskforce from 72 to 100 ABIN agents, that allegedly committed several crimes related to espionage, including the violation of the espionage software Guardião and the use wiretaps, which was forbitten by law for ABIN agents. On 29 October 2018, during the CPI of the Illegal Wiretaps, the private detective Eloy de Lacerda Ferreira affirmed that when he worked for the installation of TIM, he introduced Mauro to Brasil Telecom, and Mauro received R$10 thousand for lecturing the company's executives. The case is intertwined with a corruption scandal on Italy intensified by turn state's evidences given by Marco Bernardini, a member of SISMI. Mauro supposedly helped Telecom to spy on Daniel Dantas, the then biggest competitor from the company. Mauro said he kept contact with the chief of IT security Ângelo Jannone, but he never worked for him. Mauro was also allegedly the one who recommended Telecom to hire Eloi Lacerda and allegedly demanded the payment of US$300 thousand for discovering the industrial espionage scheme led by Kroll Inc. against the company. Mauro denied the accusations and reiterated it would be impossible for him to do all that, since the case happened "two or three years" before he was the Chief-Director of ABIN. Marcelo Itagiba (PMDB-RJ) tried to summon Mauro to explain the situation.

In 2003, the spy Raimundo Alves Ferreira Filho accused an ABIN agent from Ceará branch nicknamed "S" from international drug traffic and the wiretapping of politicians. ABIN understood that his accusations lacked materiality and Raimundo died on the same year. On 30 August 2004, O Povo published an article about the case, and Mauro visited Fortaleza due the seriousness of the accusations.

In 2005, Mauro worked on the Kignapping of João José de Vasconcellos Júnior, an engineer from Odebrecht, who was held hostage by the Mujahideen Brigades from the Jamaat Ansar Al-Sunna Army on the proximities of Baghdad, Iraq on 19 January and went missing for over a year. According to the journalist Claudio Tognolli, the Government has always known he was shot dead during the attack and Mauro invited him to go in a secret mission to gather biological proof the body offered by the kidnappers was his. Mauro denies the story. His body was retrieved in June 2007.

In February 2005, Mauro spent a week in Havana, Cuba, to exchange intelligence with the Dirección General de Inteligencia and closed a deal for the 2007 Pan-American Games. The media notified that Mauro signed a deal for the training of ABIN agents on Cuba, but Mauro insisted that the information was false. Arthur Virgílio (AM), leader of PSDB, asked the Institutional Security Bureau for information about the deal and José Carlos Aleluia (PFL-BA) summoned Mauro to the Congress to clarify details about his trip.

In March 2005, the Federal Deputy Alberto Fraga (PTB-DF) showed documents supposedly produced by ABIN in the Chamber of Deputies tying the Workers' Party (PT) with the FARCs. The documents were compiled by Jorge Félix and supposedly showed donations of US$5 million from the FARCs to PT campaign in 2002. On 12 April, Mauro declared that the documents were not produced by ABIN and blamed the news outlets for notifying the incident as fact for weeks Mauro also asked Alberto Fraga to show the documents, but Fraga recused.

On 8 June 2005, Marina Silva signed the Decree nº 5.459/2005 to combat biopiracy. The initiative was born out of a deal between the Ministry of Environment, the Federal Police, ABIN and IBAMA.

On 5 April 2005, ABIN began investigating Correios after Mauro received a report of a corruption scheme inside the agency. On 15 April, Maurício Marinho, the director of Correios, was filmed by ABIN receiving a bribe, but on the next day the agency was ordered to stop the investigations. On 6 July, Edgar Lange, an ABIN agent, was convoked to depose to the Correios CPMI. Mauro called the parliamentarians "beasts" in an internal message because of the exposure suffered by Lange. The message was leaked to the Congress. The president of the Federal Senate, Renan Calheiros (PMDB-AL), asked for his demission and threatened to sue him. Delcídio Amaral (PT-MS) announced a voting for summoning Mauro to the CPI. His exit was strongly supported by the General Jorge Armando Félix. On 13 July, Mauro fired himself and was temporarily substituted by José Nilton Campana. He was later officially replaced by Márcio Paulo Buzanelli.

== Return to the civil police of São Paulo ==
After firing himself, Mauro went to work on the 23rd Police District, in Perdizes district, São Paulo.

In April 2009, Mauro was chosen as the Chief of the Intelligence of the Division of Criminal Information by the General-Deputy Domingos de Paulo Neto during the restructuration of the Civil Police of São Paulo. He substituted Gaetano Vergine. Mauro left his post on 8 February 2013, being substituted by Edson Minoru Nakamura.

In 2012, he became member of the Ports, Airports and Tourist Protection Division.

In February 2012, he investigated a ruckus created by people associated with at least three samba schools, Vai-Vai, Império de Casa Verde and Gaviões da Fiel, in Anhembi Convention Center during Carnival to interfere with the voting for the best school of the season. At least eight people were arrested.

== Sports justice ==
In 2008, Mauro began his work at the Sports Justice Court of São Paulo (TJD-SP).

On 23 July 2012, Mauro was nominated as the President of the TJD-SP. He served for two consecutive mandates.

In 2012, Mauro was part of the Political Gestion Committee of São Paulo for the 2014 World Cup.

In February 2013, TJD-SP harshened the punishment for bringing fireworks into soccer games organized by the Federação Paulista de Futebol. Kevin Espada, a 14 year old, died on Oruro, Bolivia, during the match of Corinthians against San José during the Copa Libertadores after he was hit in his right eye by a firework. The case was judged by the TJD-SP. The firework was brought by a Corinthians supporter, also a minor. On 19 May, Corinthians was fined in R$30 thousand and forbidden to play in the first game of the 2014 Campeonato Paulista after supporters lightened fireworks in a match against Santos.

On 28 March 2014, Mauro sent a court order for the Attorney General's Office of Sports Justice to analyze the case of Matheus Índio. He played against Corinthians two days after his contract with Penapolense ended due a court order from the Rio de Janeiro Court as he was also playing for Vasco da Gama.

In July 2015, TJD-SP has forbitten the Palmeiras player Dudu from playing for 180 days after he pushed the referee Guilherme Ceretta de Lima in a game against Santos during the last game of the Campeonato Paulista.

In 2016, Mauro left the presidency of TJD-SP and became the rapporteur of the Superior Justice Court of Sports (STJD).

In October 2016, William Pottker, from Ponte Preta, punched Luan, from Atlético Clube Goianiense, during the match. Pottker was sentenced with the lightest punishment, being suspended for only four games. The team entered with a resource, but on 5 November 2020 STJD kept the punishment.

On 1 December 2016, Sport Club Internacional sent a 42 pages document for reopening the case against Victor Ramos, from Vitória, in hope the team would lose points for not complying with the Transfer Matching System and be declassified from the Campeonato Brasileiro de Futebol (CBF), as he was borrowed from Monterrey to Palmeiras. On 8 December, STJD archived the case, but one day later CBF alleged the documents were altered. The case was brought to Switzerland, but the court judged itself inapt to make a verdict. Mauro was the responsible for the investigation of the case. Mauro concluded Inter was not responsible for the adulteration of the documents, but made use of them. According to Mauro, the responsible was Francisco Godoy, Victor's agent. Subsequently, Vitório Piffero, ex-director of Inter, Anderson Barros, ex-manager of Vitória, and several lawyers were prosecuted by STJD. The lawyers from several Brazilian teams sent an open letter criticizing the way Inter was treated during the investigations. On the other hand, several people involved with the case denied to appear during the statements.

In July 2017, STJD forbade Flamengo and Vasco da Gama to play for six matches and applied a fine of R$75 thousand and R$5 thousand respectively due a confusion during the game. The clubs entered with a recourse, and Mauro judged Vasco da Gama and maintained the sentence, but reduced the fine for R$3 thousand.

On 9 March 2018, TJD-BA applied a fine of R$100 thousand against Vitória and R$75 thousand against Kanu and also suspended Kanu, Yago, Rhayner and Denilson from Vitória and Rodrigo Becão and Edson from Bahia for a ruckus during a match between both teams. On 21 March, Mauro suspended the fines.

On 23 March 2018, supporters from Grêmio and Inter fought after the game. STJD fined Inter in R$10 thousand, but the club entered with a resource but on 7 July STJD harshened the punishment by forbidding torcidas organizadas during the first three games from Campeonato Gaúcho outside of their stadiums. Federação Gaúcha de Futebol kept allowing supporters to enter the games as long as the tickets were sold by soccer teams from the countryside, and Mauro ruled the matches had to have a single torcida.

In April 2018, CBF, the Civil Police of Paraíba and the Public Ministry launched the Cartola Operation, that uncovered a scheme to manipulate the soccer matches results under the presidency of Amadeu Rodrigues from Federação Paraibana de Futebol. Many of the people involved with the scheme were forbitten to work with soccer by the STJD, but the case was criticized for having inconsistencies.

On 8 April 2018, in the last match of Campeonato Paulista, Palmeiras Accused Corinthians of external interference to win the game. The referee Marcelo Aparecido Ribeiro de Souza cancelled the penalty from Palmeiras, and the team accused him of receiving external information from Dionísio Roberto Domingos and Márcio Verri Brandão, members of the Federação Paulista de Futebol (FPF). Palmeiras ceased his association with the federation and his supporters stoned FPF headquarters and tore Corinthians symbols from the walls. In September, STJD ruled the case in favor of Corinthians, with Mauro saying he thought there was external interference, but he wasn't 100% sure.

In July 2018, Breno from Vasco da Gama was suspended from playing for two games, but on 18 July Mauro agreed in letting him play against Fluminense as the process wasn't finished.

In August 2018, Mauro suspended Matheus Galdezani and Elias from Atlético Mineiro for 40 days and two matches and fined the president of the team, Sérgio Sette Câmara, for offenses against the referees during a game against Palmeiras. The club entered with a resource, and on 3 August Mauro cancelled the fine but kept the suspensions.

On 25 May 2019, Botafogo lost against Palmeiras for 1x0 and asked for the result to be reevaluated by STJD arguing the video assistant referee was misused during the match. On 18 June, STJD maintained the result by unanimity.

On 31 August 2019, a Bragantino player cursed against the goalkeeper of Brasil de Pelotas using racial slurs. Bragantino was initially absolved, but on 7 November STJD fined the club in R$2 thousand.

Mauro term was renewed in 2020, and he also became the Magistrate of STJD for Southeast Brazil. The indications for the board were marked by the influence of Marco Polo Del Nero, banned from FIFA for corruption. Mauro thanked Marco for his indication on his speech.

In November 2020, STJ-SP punished the clubs Paulista de Jundiaí and Olímpia and the players Samuel Sampaio and Fernando Andrade for manipulating the results of Campeonato Paulista. The clubs appealed, and on 8 July 2021, STJD kept the punishments by unanimity.

On 19 November 2020, STJD absolved Flamengo for being late on the match against Palmeiras.

On 8 May 2021, Ceará supporters started a fight after Salvador won the Copa do Nordeste. On 10 June, Mauro issued a fine against Ceará and defended the suspension of Jael, Gabriel Dias and Stiven Mendoza for two games, But Ceará got permission for Mendonza to play in Copa do Brasil. Mauro proposed a harsher punishment for the players, which was done on 15 July.

On 6 July 2021, Felipe Conceição declared the match result was manipulated after Cruzeiro lost against CRB. He was suspended for two games on 20 July. On 19 August, Mauro fined Felipe in R$20 thousand.

In August 2021, Paulo Roberto Santos, coach of São Bento, was suspended for three games for invading the field to complain against the turning-point of Madureira. The club entered with an appeal, but on 30 September STJD maintained the sentence. Mauro voted in favor of maintaining the sentence.

On 28 August 2021, Brusque supporters called racial slurs against Celsinho, Londrina player. One day after, Brusque called the incident as "opportunism and fake accusations", but later on asked for sorry. On 24 September, STJD fined Brusque in R$60 thousand and the team lost 3 points in B Series, and suspended Antônio Petermann for 360 days and fined him in R$30 thousand. On 18 November, STJD gave the points back to Brusque. Mauro voted for the reduction of the sentence.

On 20 October 2021, Mauro was part of a meeting to discuss security issues during the match between Flamengo and Palmeiras during the end of Copa Libertadores in Montevideo, Uruguay. He acted as the Brazilian Coordinator of the Taskforce.

In October 2022, 112 chief officers from the Civil Police of São Paulo, including Mauro, signed a letter in defense of democracy during the 2022 Election, where Lula disputed against the neofascist candidate and then president Jair Bolsonaro.

In 2023, TJD-MS relegated Operário Caarapoense for the B Series of the 2024 Campeonato Sul-Mato-Grossense for the irregular line-up of Lisandro Pires e Ferdinando Leda. The team appealed, but in September Mauro deemed the appeal unjustifiable.

On 6 August 2023, a judicial action was moved against Operário for supposed racial slurs against Jefferson from São Bernardo. On 7 December, Mauro voted for the closure of the case for lack of proof, and the team was absolved.

On 12 November 2023, Duilio Monteiro Alves, Bruno Méndez and Alessandro, from Corinthians, were penalized with a series of incidents involving cursing the arbitrage and excessive use of force in a game against Grêmio. One month later, Mauro lifted the penalties.

In 2023, Mauro was the rapporteur of a corruption scandal involving soccer. Judges were recorded complaining for not receiving bribes from soccer representatives and there was evidence the Brazilian Cups from 2021 to 2023 were manipulated. John Textor, owner of the Sociedade Anônima do Futebol of Botafogo, was indicted in 2024 for not delivering evidence during the trial. Mauro asked for a suspension of six years and a R$2 million fine. The CPI of the Manipulation of Sports Results and Bets was opened because of the repercussion of the case. Textor accused Mauro of working for Palmeiras.

== Journalism and social media ==
From 2000 to 2002, Mauro has written for Conjur about cybercrime. He has also written for Observatório da Imprensa in 2004 and 2014 and for Folha de S. Paulo from 1994 to 2004.

On 12 March 2017, Mauro launched his website to write about public and corporative safety and cybercrime.

Mauro is known for being very active on his social media. In April 2024, he became notorious for posing with Oprah Winfrey while showing his police badge and wrote "Now, Oprah is an honorary member of the Civil Police". Mauro came into public to clarify that the homage was a joke.
