= Geographer =

Professional specializing in geography

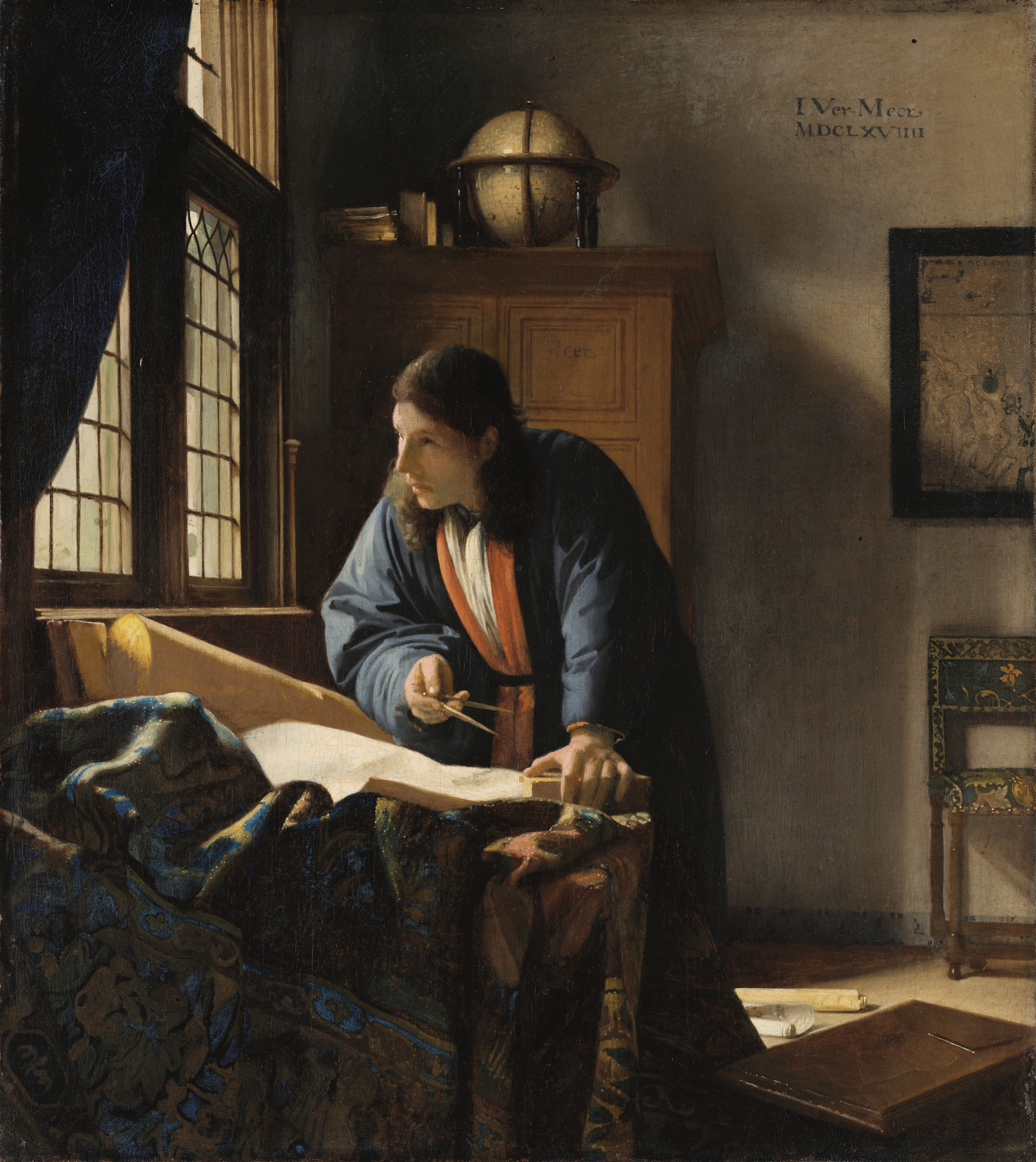
- The Geographer by Johannes Vermeer (1669)

Occupation
- Occupation type: Profession
- Activity sectors: Geography; environmental analysis; spatial planning; geospatial analysis; research

Description
- Competencies: Spatial analysis; fieldwork; cartography; qualitative and quantitative research; geographic information systems
- Education required: University education in geography or equivalent professional experience; requirements vary by country
- Fields of employment: Government; consulting; environmental and planning organizations; private sector; research and higher education
- Related jobs: Cartographer; urban planner; environmental scientist

A geographer is a professional whose work applies the concepts, methods and techniques of geography to the analysis of places, regions, environments and spatial relationships. Geographers examine the distribution and organization of natural and human phenomena at different geographic scales, drawing on physical geography, human geography and fields that integrate aspects of both.

Geographers use fieldwork, cartography, spatial analysis, quantitative and qualitative methods, remote sensing, geographic information systems (GIS) and other geospatial techniques to collect, represent and interpret geographic information. Their professional work may include physical geography and environmental studies, biogeography, population and socioeconomic analysis, land-use and regional studies, planning, transport and accessibility analysis, natural resource assessment, mapping and geospatial analysis. Geographers work in government agencies, consulting firms, private companies, nonprofit organizations, research institutions and universities.

Professional roles and forms of recognition vary internationally according to national educational, occupational and regulatory systems.

== Professional practice ==
The work of geographers commonly involves the analysis of spatial patterns, processes and relationships and the integration of information concerning natural environments and human societies. Practice varies according to specialization and institutional setting, and geographers commonly work in multidisciplinary teams.

Field soil survey and mapping at Seedskadee National Wildlife Refuge in Wyoming, United States.

Major areas of professional practice include:

- Physical geography and environmental analysis — investigation, analysis and mapping of landforms, soils, water, climate, drainage basins, land cover, landscapes, environmental processes, natural hazards and environmental vulnerability.
- Biogeography — analysis and mapping of the spatial distribution of vegetation, species, ecological communities and habitats, including their relationships with climate, relief, soils and landscape change. Specialized fields include phytogeography and zoogeography.
- Population and society — geographic analysis of population distribution and structure, migration, urbanization, spatial inequalities, access to services, socioeconomic conditions and relationships between people and places.
- Economic geography and political geography — analysis of the spatial organization of economic activities, infrastructure, resources, markets and flows, as well as boundaries, political processes and relationships between space, power and governance.
- Urban, regional and spatial planning — regional and land-use analysis, spatial indicators, regional delineation, accessibility studies and contributions to urban, rural and regional planning, environmental planning and economic development.
- Transport geography, mobility and networks — analysis of transport networks, flows of people and goods, accessibility, connectivity, service areas and relationships between transport systems, land use and settlement patterns.
- Cartography and geospatial analysis — production and interpretation of thematic maps and spatial databases, analysis of satellite and aerial imagery, remote sensing, GIS, spatial modelling, network analysis and other forms of geospatial analysis.
- Research, consulting and public administration — geographic research, spatial and environmental assessments, technical reports, environmental impact assessments, policy support and advisory work in government, consulting, nonprofit organizations, private companies and research institutions.

Across these fields, geographic work commonly emphasizes spatial relationships, geographic scale, regional differentiation and interactions between human and environmental processes.

== Methods and techniques ==
Geographic analysis examines the location, distribution, concentration, dispersion, connectivity and spatial differentiation of phenomena and the relationships among processes operating at different scales. Concepts such as space, place, region, landscape, networks and geographic scale provide different frameworks for interpreting spatial organization.

Geographers use both quantitative and qualitative methods. Depending on the research or professional problem, these may include statistical and spatial analysis, documentary and archival research, interviews, questionnaires, focus groups, observation, field measurement, sampling and other forms of field investigation.

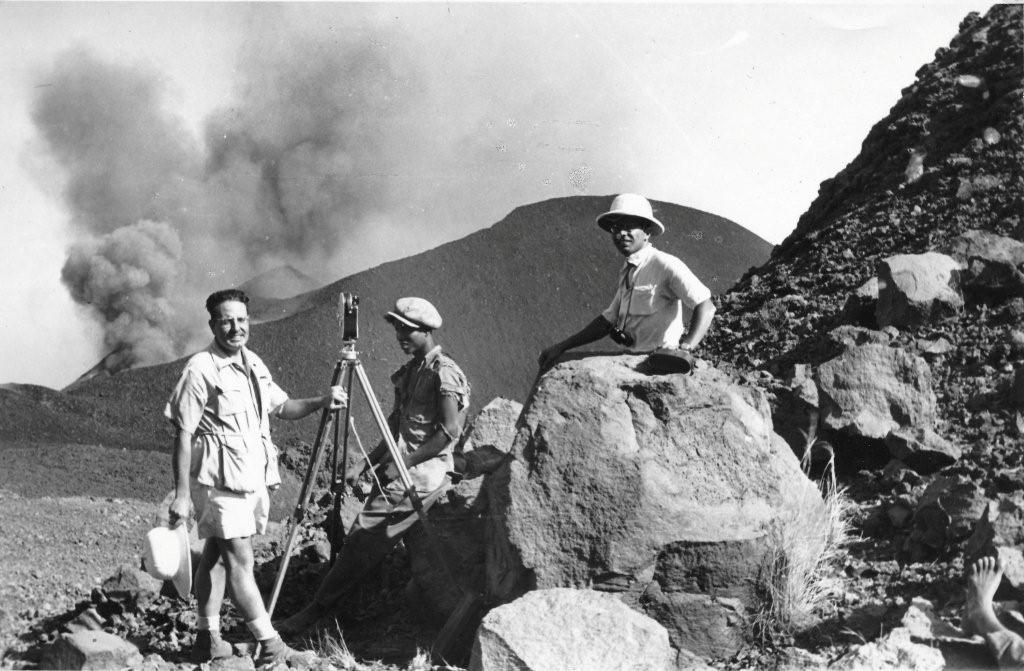
Portuguese geographer Orlando Ribeiro photographing the 1951 eruption of Pico do Fogo in Cape Verde during fieldwork.

Fieldwork may be used to observe landscapes and landforms, describe soils and vegetation, measure environmental characteristics, document land use, collect samples or geographic coordinates, and obtain information from residents, institutions or other participants. The character of field investigation varies substantially among branches of physical and human geography.

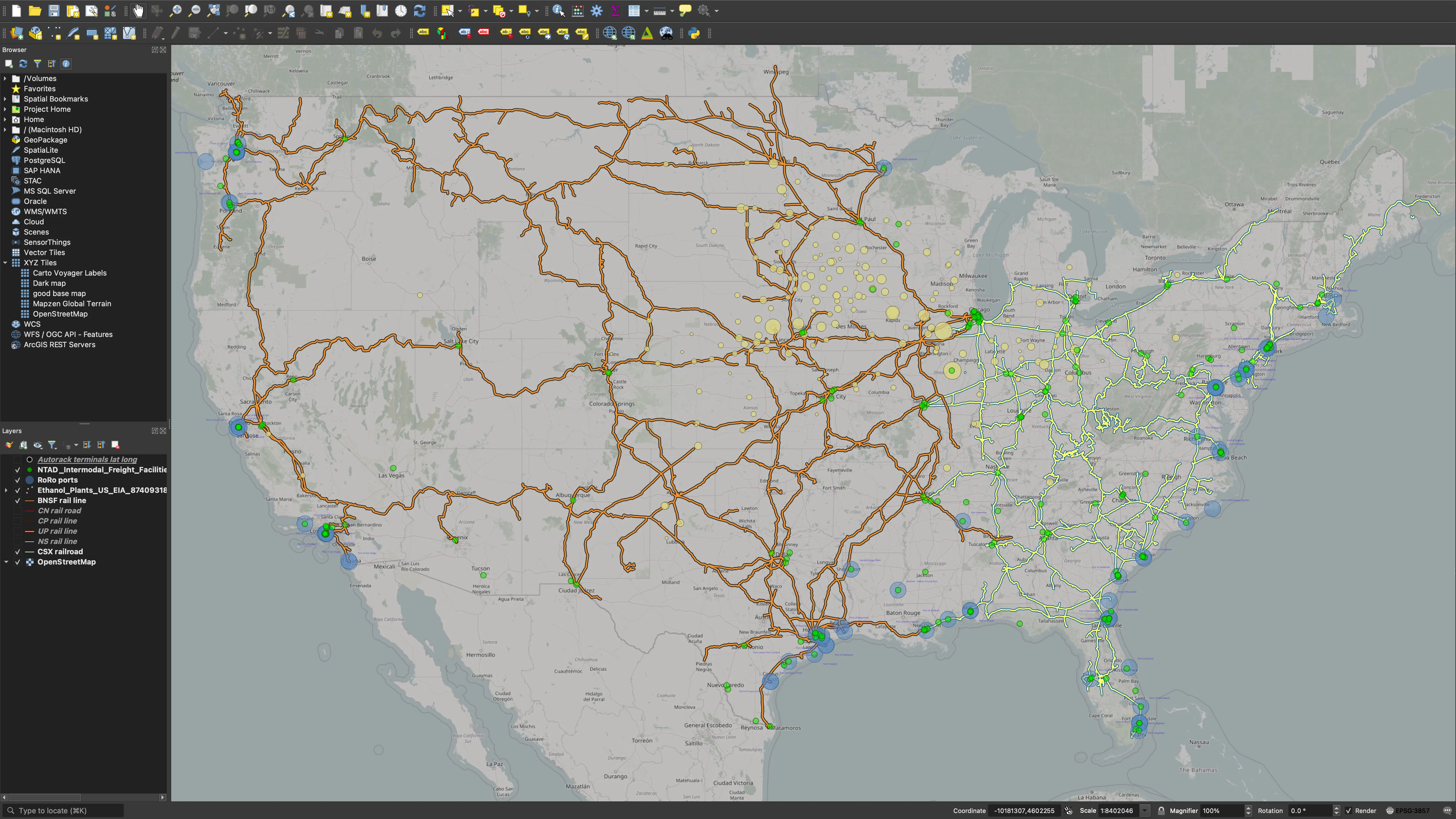
Interface of QGIS, a geographic information system used to organize, analyze and represent georeferenced information.

Cartography is used to communicate geographic information and as a means of spatial analysis. GIS, remote sensing, digital cartography, spatial databases and related technologies allow geographers to integrate information from censuses, field surveys, satellite imagery, administrative records and other sources and to examine spatial patterns and relationships.

The growing availability of digital geographic information and computer-based spatial analysis from the second half of the twentieth century expanded the range of methods used in professional geography. GIS became an important component of many areas of geographic practice alongside field, qualitative, statistical and cartographic methods.

== History and professionalization ==
=== Early geographers ===
The term geographer predates the modern profession by many centuries. In the ancient Mediterranean world, figures including Eratosthenes, Strabo and Ptolemy compiled and systematized knowledge about places, distances, environments and representations of the Earth's surface.

For much of history, geographic knowledge was produced by scholars, travellers, mapmakers, administrators and other practitioners rather than by members of a standardized modern profession. The occupational identity of the geographer developed gradually alongside the institutionalization of geography in universities, learned societies and public institutions.

=== Emergence of the modern profession ===
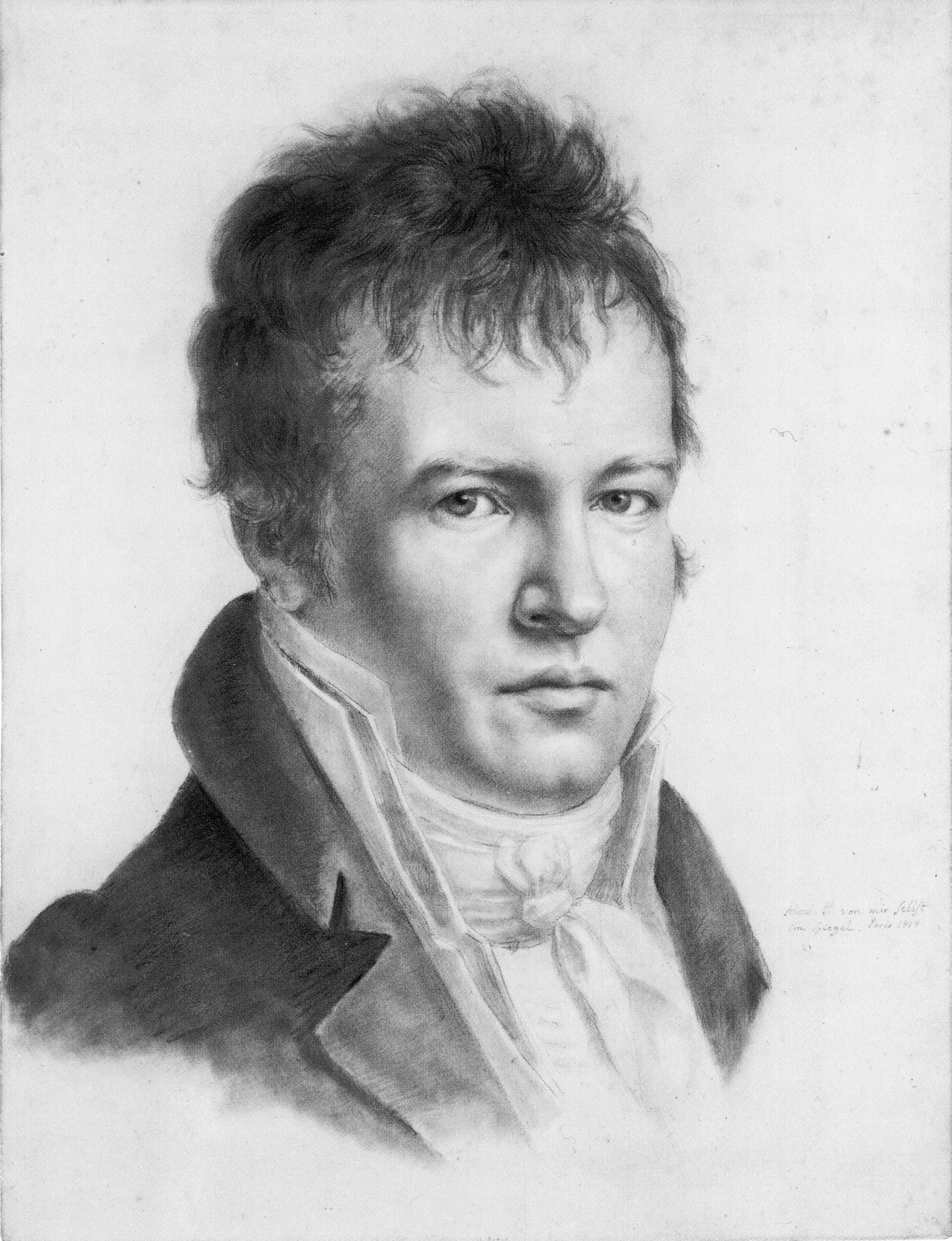
Alexander von Humboldt, whose comparative studies of environments contributed to the development of modern physical geography and biogeography.

The modern professional identity of the geographer developed principally during the nineteenth and early twentieth centuries as geography became established in universities and scientific institutions. Alexander von Humboldt and Carl Ritter were influential in the development of systematic geographic study, while later German, French, British and North American traditions contributed different approaches to physical, human and regional geography.

The creation of geographical societies supported research, exploration, publication and geographic education. The Royal Geographical Society (RGS), founded in London in 1830, later supported the establishment of university geography in the United Kingdom and the development of geographical education. In France, the work of Paul Vidal de La Blache and his students was influential in the development of human and regional geography and in the international diffusion of the French geographic tradition.

In the United States, the organization now known as the American Association of Geographers was founded in 1904 as the Association of American Geographers to advance professional studies in geography and the application of geographic research. In 1948 it merged with the American Society of Professional Geographers, bringing the two organizations into a single national association.

=== Expansion of professional practice ===
During the twentieth century, geographers became increasingly employed outside universities in government agencies, mapping and survey organizations, planning bodies, consulting, resource assessment and other forms of applied research. The growth of censuses, aerial photography, environmental surveys, regional planning and quantitative methods expanded the range of geographic work.

In Canada, the federal government established a Geographical Bureau in 1947 to collect, organize and make available geographic information about Canada and other areas of national importance. The bureau employed a group of professional geographers and contributed to the establishment of the Canadian Association of Geographers in 1951.

In Brazil, the creation of the Brazilian Council of Geography in 1937 helped institutionalize geographic research and the coordination of official geographic services; the council became part of the institutional structure that developed into the Brazilian Institute of Geography and Statistics (IBGE).

From the mid-twentieth century, quantitative geography and computer-based spatial analysis introduced new techniques into professional practice. British-Canadian geographer Roger Tomlinson conceived and led the development of the Canada Geographic Information System for the Canada Land Inventory in the 1960s. It became one of the earliest operational geographic information systems and was influential in the subsequent development of GIS.

By the late twentieth and early twenty-first centuries, professional geographic practice had diversified across environmental analysis, spatial planning, public administration, transport, development, natural hazards, geospatial analysis and other fields, while retaining close links with research and higher education.

== Education and professional recognition ==
University education in geography commonly combines human and physical geography with training in field methods, cartography, spatial analysis, research methods and geospatial technologies. Degree structures and forms of professional recognition vary among countries and institutions.

=== United States ===
In the United States, geographer is recognized as a distinct occupation by the Bureau of Labor Statistics. Entry into the occupation typically requires at least a bachelor's degree, while some positions require graduate qualifications.

Geographers work in federal, state and local government, professional and technical services, educational institutions, private firms and nonprofit organizations. Professional activities include field research, spatial analysis, land-use and population studies, environmental work, planning, mapping, remote sensing and GIS. The American Association of Geographers supports professional development and represents geographers working in academic and non-academic settings.

=== United Kingdom ===
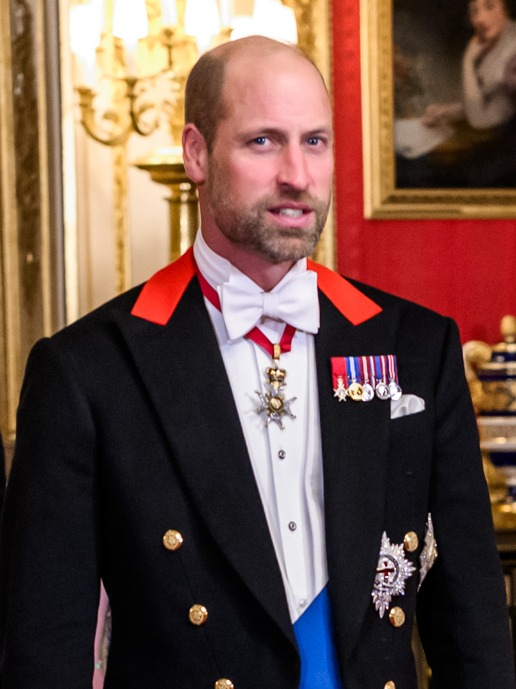
William, Prince of Wales, who graduated with an MA (Honours) in Geography from the University of St Andrews in 2005.

In the United Kingdom, university education in geography supports careers in environmental management, planning, geospatial analysis, government, consultancy, economic development, research and other fields. The Royal Geographical Society is the United Kingdom's learned society and professional body for geography.

The RGS awards the professional designation Chartered Geographer (CGeog), which recognizes competence, experience and professionalism in the use of geographic knowledge, skills and understanding in the workplace. Chartered status is maintained through continuing professional development.

=== Canada ===
In Canada, geographer is included within the federal National Occupational Classification among professional occupations in the social sciences. Geographers are employed in universities and throughout the public and private sectors, and university education is normally required.

Professional geography in Canada has longstanding links with federal and provincial government, regional studies, northern research, resource assessment, planning and mapping. Canada also played a major role in the development of modern GIS through the work of Roger Tomlinson and the Canada Geographic Information System.

=== Brazil ===
Brazil has a statutory framework specifically regulating the profession of geographer. Federal Law No. 6,664 of 1979 reserves the professional designation geógrafo to persons meeting the qualifications established by law and defines areas of professional competence.

Geographers are part of the Confea/Crea professional council system, a statutory system of federal and regional professional councils that also covers engineers, agronomists, geologists, meteorologists and technologists. The Federal Council of Engineering and Agronomy (Confea) operates at the federal level, while 27 Regional Councils of Engineering and Agronomy (Creas) register professionals and directly supervise professional practice within their jurisdictions.

Registration with the relevant Crea is required for the legal exercise of professional activities covered by the system. Professional title, activities and competencies are assigned according to the individual's academic training and recorded by the competent regional council. The statutory scope includes geographic surveys, studies and research concerning physical environments, biogeography, human geography and geoeconomic conditions, among other applications defined by law.

For technical works and services covered by the system, professional responsibility is recorded through an Anotação de Responsabilidade Técnica (ART), a statutory record identifying the responsible professional and the technical activity performed.

=== International perspectives ===
Elsewhere, geographers work under a range of academic, occupational and professional systems. University qualifications, public-service classifications, professional accreditation and statutory frameworks vary by country, while geographic methods and fields of practice remain internationally connected through universities, government agencies and professional societies.

== Professional and scientific organizations ==
Geographers are represented by international and national scientific societies, professional bodies and public institutions concerned with geographic research and practice.

The International Geographical Union (IGU), formally established in 1922, promotes international cooperation in geography through national committees, research commissions, congresses and related scientific activities.

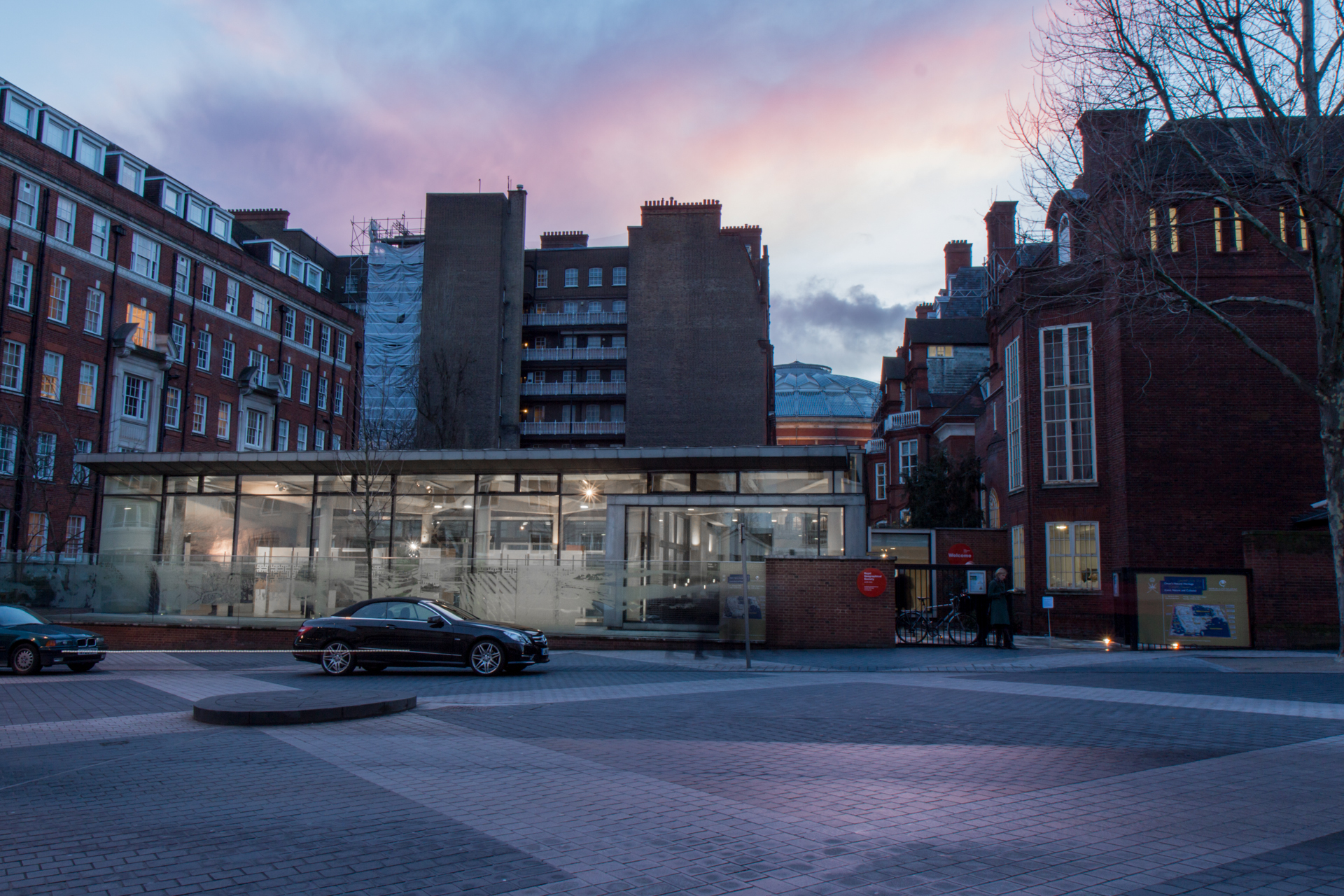
The headquarters of the Royal Geographical Society at Lowther Lodge in London.

In the United Kingdom, the Royal Geographical Society, founded in 1830, supports geographic research, fieldwork, education and professional practice and awards Chartered Geographer status. In the United States, the American Association of Geographers (AAG), founded in 1904 as the Association of American Geographers, is a scientific and professional association whose members work across academia, government, business and nonprofit organizations. The Canadian Association of Geographers (CAG), established in 1951, promotes geographic research, education and professional exchange in Canada.

In Brazil, the Brazilian Institute of Geography and Statistics is a federal institution responsible for the production and coordination of statistical, geographic, cartographic, geodetic, environmental and census information. Its Directorate of Geosciences produces geographic information used in territorial analysis and planning. The Associação dos Geógrafos Brasileiros (AGB), founded in 1934, is a longstanding Brazilian association of geographers, geography teachers, researchers and students.

== Notable geographers ==
British geographer David Harvey, known for influential work in urban geography, political economy and the geographical analysis of capitalism.

The Vautrin Lud Prize, awarded at the International Geography Festival in Saint-Dié-des-Vosges, France, is an international distinction recognizing a geographer's body of work and research. Recipients are selected by an international jury following consultation with geographers from around the world. Recipients have included Milton Santos, David Harvey, Doreen Massey, Michael Frank Goodchild, Yi-Fu Tuan, Akin Mabogunje, Gilbert F. White and Torsten Hägerstrand.

Geographers associated with influential contributions across different branches and periods include:

- Alexander von Humboldt (1769–1859), whose comparative study of climate, vegetation, elevation and other environmental phenomena influenced physical geography and biogeography.
- Carl O. Sauer (1889–1975), influential in cultural and historical geography and associated with the Berkeley School of cultural geography.
- Gilbert F. White (1911–2006), known for research on natural hazards, human adjustment to floods and floodplain management.
- Torsten Hägerstrand (1916–2004), whose work on spatial diffusion and time geography influenced human geography and spatial analysis.
- Yi-Fu Tuan (1930–2022), a major figure in humanistic geography and the geographic study of space, place and human experience.
- Akin Mabogunje (1931–2022), whose work connected urban geography, regional development, planning and geographic scholarship in Africa.
- David Harvey (born 1935), influential in urban geography, political economy and geographic social theory.
- Doreen Massey (1944–2016), known for work on economic geography and relational understandings of space, place and power.
- Roger Tomlinson (1933–2014), a principal figure in the development of modern geographic information systems.
- Michael Frank Goodchild (born 1944), influential in the development of geographic information science and research on spatial data and analysis.
- Milton Santos (1926–2001), whose work addressed urbanization, geographic space, territory and globalization and became influential in Brazilian and international human geography.
- Karen Seto (born 1967), whose research examines urbanization, land-use change and global environmental change using remote sensing, field research and spatial modelling.

== Cultural representations ==
Geographers and geographic practice have appeared in visual art, literature and film.

Johannes Vermeer's painting The Geographer, shown in the infobox, depicts a scholar working among maps, a terrestrial globe and measuring instruments. The Städel Museum, which holds the painting, interprets the figure as engaged with cartographic measurement and geographic knowledge.

In Jules Verne's novel In Search of the Castaways (also published in English as The Children of Captain Grant), Jacques Paganel is a geographer whose geographic knowledge and interpretation of maps form part of the expedition narrative.

In Antoine de Saint-Exupéry's 1943 novella The Little Prince, the protagonist encounters a geographer who records information brought by explorers in large books, distinguishing the compilation and evaluation of geographic knowledge from exploration itself.

The 2014 film Paddington features the fictional Geographers' Guild of Great Britain, an institution preserving records of expeditions connected with the character's origins. Geographic institutions and the representation of professional geography across the wider Paddington Bear franchise have themselves been examined in academic geographical research.

== See also ==
- Geographers on Film
- List of geographical societies
- List of geography awards
