= Rose di Primo =

Brazilian model and actress (born 1955)

- Born: Rosimary Souza Primo; 6 March 1955 (age 71); São Paulo, Brazil
- Occupations: Model; actress

Rosimary Souza Primo, better known as Rose di Primo (born 6 March 1955), is a former Brazilian model and actress. A sex symbol of the 1970s, she was one of the most sought after Brazilian models during that time. She is considered to be the inventor of the thong bikini.

== Career ==
Di Primo's career began off at the age of 16 when she won a beauty pageant sponsored by broadcaster Flávio Cavalcanti. At the age of 18, she appeared on the cover of Manchete magazine. She was photographed seated on a motorbike wearing a white bikini. After this, she was known nationally in Brazil and became one of the country's most sought after models of the 1970s. In the 1980s, she posed nude for Playboy, Ele e Ela and Status. At the time, she held the record for appearing on the cover of men's magazines the greatest number of times, and she also starred in a controversial yogurt commercial. She has acted in some films, most notably Os Machões (1972), Uma Virgem Na Praça (1973), Clockwork Banana (1974) and O Padre Queria Pecar.
