= Asma Khader =

Jordanian politician (1952–2021)

Minister of Culture
- In office 25 October 2004 – 4 May 2005
- Preceded by: Haider Mahmoud
- Succeeded by: Adel Al-Twaisy

Member of the Senate of Jordan
- In office 23 April 2014 – 25 October 2015

Personal details
- Born: 25 January 1952 Zababdeh, Palestine
- Died: 20 December 2021 (aged 69) Amman, Jordan

Asma Khader (Arabic: أسمى خضر; 25 January 1952 – 20 December 2021) was a lawyer, devoted feminist, women's rights and human rights activist and a Jordanian politician. She served as the first government spokesperson in Jordan, a Minister of Culture from 2004 to 2005, and a member of the Senate from 2014 to 2015. Khader died from pancreatic cancer on 20 December 2021, at the age of 69 in Amman.
