= Bandeirante University of São Paulo =

Brazilian private university in São Paulo

- Universidade Bandeirante de São Paulo
- Other names: UNIBAN
- Former names: Colégio Buenos Aires (1903–1982); Centro de Ensino Unificado Bandeirante (1982–1993)
- Established: 1903
- Students: Approx. 75,000
- Location: São Bernardo do Campo, São Paulo, Brazil
- Website: www.uniban.br

Bandeirante University of São Paulo (in Portuguese, Universidade Bandeirante de São Paulo or UNIBAN) is a private university in São Paulo, Brazil. It is one of the largest institutions of higher learning in the country, with approximately 75,000 undergraduate and graduate students and thirteen campuses in the cities of São Paulo, Osasco and São Bernardo do Campo. Uniban is owned by Anhanguera Educacional, the biggest for-profit educational company in Brazil.

== History ==
UNIBAN was initially founded as the Buenos Aires College (now called the Father Antonio Vieira College) by Pedro Pinto in the district of Santana. His son, Heitor Pinto e Silva, began enrollment at the Academia Paulista Anchieta, the entity which oversaw UNIBAN. Pedro Pinto's grandson, Heitor Pinto Filho, increased the enrolment at the institution, which would become UNIBAN.

After spending the 1970s heading schools which taught first and second grades, Pinto Filho joined the Paulista School of Arts in 1982, which was founded in 1956 by the musical conductor, Eleazar de Carvalho.

Expanding to include tertiary education, it opened the Moema school of Arts and Sciences, Our Lady of Medianeira school of Philosophy and the Dom Domênico school.

In 1988, the Federal Education Council unified the "federation" faculties, forming the Bandeirante Unified Teaching Center (CEUB).

In December 1993, the same council recognized - and the Ministry of Education approved in January 1994 - the creation of the university.

In 2008, with the integration of the Pan American University (UNIPAN), located in the cities of Cascavel, Parana and Sao Jose, Santa Catarina, today, UNIBAN not only operates in the state of São Paulo but throughout the country.

== Controversies ==
=== Student harassment ===
On October 22, 2009, Geisy Arruda, a student of graduation in Tourism, went to school dressed in a short skirt which was considered inappropriate by some of her fellow students. This caused a backlash based on moral grounds and ended with the student being harassed and verbally attacked within the university. She was forced to leave the school grounds dressed in a jacket and escorted by police who dispersed the crowds with pepper spray. Videos of the incident were uploaded to YouTube causing national repercussions.

After the incident drew considerable national and international attention the actions of the university's students who harassed Arruda were denounced as sexist by the female portion of the National Students Union of Brazil and by the Chamber of Deputies of Brazil. The Order of Attorneys of Brazil asked for a public apology by UNIBAN to the student. Senators Valter Pereira and Eduardo Suplicy spoke out against the incident.

On November 7, 2009, the university used paid public announcement to declare that it had expelled Arruda from the university for "disrespecting ethical principles, academic dignity and morality." The university's decision was declared as sexist by the National Union of Students, which said that "the university was living in the caveman era" and believed the actions were very unusual.

On November 9, UNIBAN decided to reverse its decision. Arruda's lawyers nevertheless were unsatisfied citing that she had suffered from seven crimes: abuse, threats, defamation, false imprisonment, obscene acts from fellow students, embarrassment and incitement to crime. That same day, an investigation by the Delegation for the Defense of Women in the municipality of São Bernardo do Campo was commissioned to determine whether there had been libel.

=== Hiring an interpreter for a deaf student ===
In September 2009, the Federal Public Ministry demanded that UNIBAN hire an interpreter for a student who was hard of hearing. The student would have had difficulties completing her studies without a Brazilian Sign Language interpreter. According to the university, the student received "specialized educational material and the service of skilled professionals".

=== Integrated courses ===
From March 22, 2010 the MEC has insisted on the immediate suspension of integrated Uniban courses. The university offered linkage between undergraduate, graduate and sequential level programs. This teaching model was considered irregular as it allows, on average, two to three years of sequenced courses. Students obtain certificates or a higher diploma after two years of study. For persons completing regular training a bachelor's degree is offered at the end of three years. Students who follow the post sensu lato program of study will receive the specialization title in the final year of undergraduate studies.
