= José Carlos Avellar =

Brazilian film critic/essayist (1936–2016)

José Carlos Avellar (15 December 1936 – 18 March 2016) was a Brazilian film critic and essayist.

== Early life and education ==
Born in Rio de Janeiro in 1936.

== Career ==
Avellar worked for over twenty years as a film critic for the Jornal do Brasil. Avellar was also a film critic for Escrever Cinema and taught film at the University of Guadalajara in Mexico. Avellar published six books on film theory, and co-authored dozens of studies on the Brazilian cinema and Latin America - including Le Cinéma brésilien (Centre Pompidou, Paris) and Hojas de Cine (Universidad Autonoma Metropolitana, Mexico).
