= Q-Refres-Ko =

Brazilian candy factory

- Type: Private
- Industry: Food industry
- Founded: 1965; 61 years ago
- Founder: Cepeda family
- Headquarters: São Paulo, Brazil
- Products: Soft, Ploc, Fresh, Tang, Ping Pong, Confeti, Delicado, Jujuba, Q-Gel, Ki-banba, Ki-Coco, Plets, Dulcora
- Parent: Philip Morris International

Q-Refres-Ko is a candy factory from São Paulo. Created in 1965 by the Cepeda Family, ex-Kibon employees, it was bought by Philip Morris International in December 1993.

== History ==
Q-Refres-Ko was created in 1965 on São Paulo by Armando do Nascimento Cepeda, Sylvio Propheta, Luiz Redoschi and Willy Schworer ex-Kibon employes.

In the 80s, Soft, their brand of candy, was a success, and the company exported 100 million candies to the United States. In 1982, General Foods became partners of Q-Refres-Ko and the company created Q-Refres-Ko S.A. for joint production with Kibon.

In December 1993, Philip Morris bought Q-Refres-Ko and ended the Soft candy production. Q-Refres-Ko became a subsidiary from Kibon and started selling Tang in Brazil. After the restructure of the company, Q-Refres-Ko lost space in the drink mix market for alternative drinks and became more aggressive in their promotions. The company began a recovery process in 1995, when it quickly regained the space lost to Arisco.

== Products ==
Q-Refres-Ko was known for producing candies, such as the Soft candy, Ploc chewing gum and the drink mix Fresh. Soft was very popular during the 80s, and was nicknamed as the "killer candy", as an urban legend stated that several children died chocked by the candy.

After the acquisition by Phillips Morris, Q-Refresco began the production and sale of Tang in Brazil. In 1994, the company produced the first Tang commercial in Latin America. Q-Refres-Ko also produced easter eggs, but according to Phillips Morris, their participation in the market was "insignificant".

== Controversies ==
=== 1983 fake job vacancies incident ===
In 1983, a rumor circulated in São Paulo about the opening of 300 job vacancies on Q-Refres-Ko. As the city was passing through an economical crisis, on 3 April several people appeared for the job. Angry with the situation, the unemployed, according to the journal O Estado de São Paulo, were supposedly convinced by Aurélio Perez, from the Communist Party of Brazil (PCdoB) to join their protest and march to Largo 13 de Maio. According to the manifestants, at 8h50, the Military Police of São Paulo tried to repress the group when they were passing at the Administrative Center of Santo Amaro, and the manifestation soon transformed into a riot, with the Barateiro supermarket being robbed. The governor Franco Montoro had also sent a truck from Cobal full of oranges for the manifestants, but the truck was also rioted. First, the governmental forces tried to stop the riot peacefully, but it quickly grew and several supermarkets were raided. Besides, 700 manifestants tried to free prisoners from the 11th Police Department, but they were repressed by the Military Police. On the next day, manifestants tried to invade ALESP and entered in conflict with the chock troops. Cars and houses from Morumbi were also stoned. The riots spread through the whole city and on the third day São Paulo was heavily militarized. 566 people were arrested, 127 injured, 15 private vehicles and 7 police vehicles were damaged, 5 knives were apprehended and in total 48 supermarkets were rioted.

=== 1995 wiretapping scandal ===
In 1995, Antônio Carlos Ferreira, Isael Pinto e José Martinho, ex-executives from Q-Refres-Ko, accused Phillips Morris of wiretapping their cellphones. Valdir Matias dos Santos, a private detective from Barros de Investigação, supposedly received R$ 10 to transcribe 50 tapes recorded by Phillips Morris, and tried to extort the executives in R$ 14 thousand. The executives brought the case for Mauro Marcelo, from the Civil Police of São Paulo, and Valdir was arrested on 3 May. The case happened after the three of them fired themselves on 27 March. According to them, they were also threatened by security guards and were searched inside of the company with guns pointed at their chest.

Phillips Morris accused the executives of firing themselves to sell industrial secrets, affirming that the wiretaps had legal precedent. The affirmation was investigated by the delegate Romeu Tuma Jr. Shortly after, Mauro accused the vice-president, Richard Sucre, and five Brazilian directors from Philip Morris of wiretapping, illegal embarrassment and maintenance of private prison and the Public Ministry of São Paulo accused the private detectives Francisco Assis Barros e Valdir dos Santos of wiretapping. The Federal Police also stopped Richard Sucre of leaving the country.

During the process, Phillip Morris affirmed that the ex-executives asked for US$ 3 million for not leaking their industrial secrets. They also sustained that the executives didn't fire themselves, but were fired. Later, they formed the company General Bands Comércio de Alimentos to compete with Q-Refres-Ko. The company obtained the right to wiretap the ex-executives, but as Telesp doesn't wiretap in internal extension telephones, they had to hire private detectives. Furthermore, they accused Maruro Marcelo and Thomaz Bastos, the ex-executives lawyers, to plot together to prejudice the company. Sucre affirmed he was only aware of the case after reading the journals. Isael Pinto, one of the ex-executives, was responsible for producing Ki-Suco, the Brazilian version of Kool-Aid, in General Brands.
