= Sexy (magazine) =

Brazilian men's magazine

- Categories: Men's
- Frequency: Monthly
- Publisher: Editora Rickdan
- First issue: 1992
- Country: Brazil
- Language: Portuguese

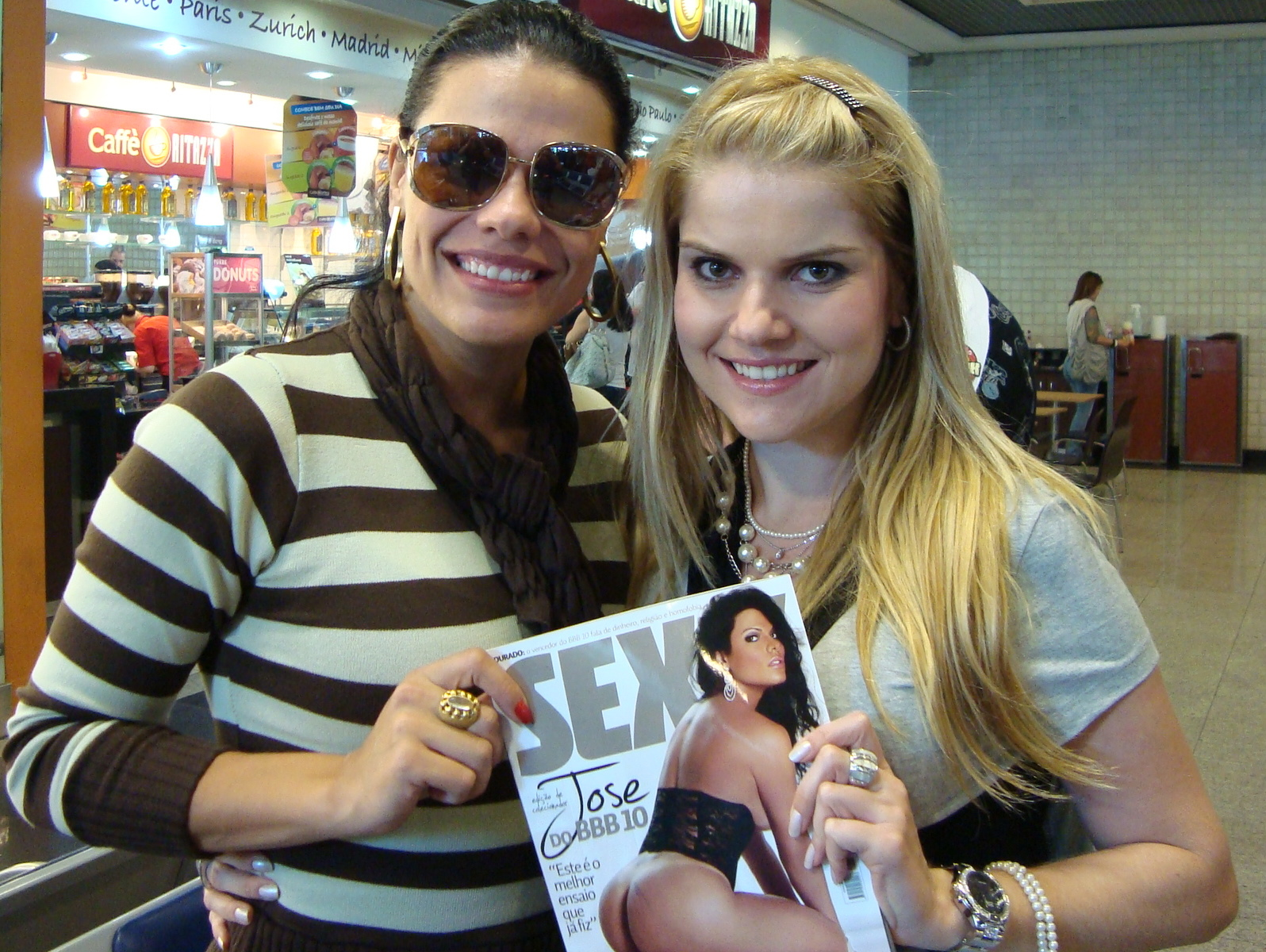
Joseane Oliveira (left) aside a fan and her cover of Sexy magazine.

Sexy is a Brazilian men's magazine published by Editora Rickdan. It was founded by Michael Koellreutter in 1992. The magazine is the main competitor of Playboy in Brazil, and has had women such as Andressa Urach, Viviane Araújo, Nana Gouvêa, and Geisy Arruda on its covers.

== History ==
The first version of the Sexy magazine, without nude shoots, was published by Art Editores (a subsidiary of Editora Abril) and had actress Carolina Ferraz on its cover. Initially, the magazine was identified as more explicit than its main competitor with greater visualization of female genitalia. However, in 2004 under the direction of editor Edson Aran, it underwent a reformulation, adopting a style more similar to that of Playboy which generated discontent among its audience. The change, however, resulted in the appearance of many women who were previously unimaginable being able to pose nude for the magazine, such as Cissa Guimarães, Marisol Ribeiro and Scheila Carvalho. In 2016, the magazine announced that it would focus solely on photo shoots, with only the reports being sponsored contents.

== See also ==
- Ele e Ela (magazine)
- Status (magazine)
