= Federal Council of Engineering and Agronomy =

The Federal Council of Engineering and Agronomy (Confea) is a Brazilian federal public authority instituted by Decree 23,569 of December 11, 1933, promulgated by the then President of the Republic, Getúlio Vargas. Currently, Confea is governed by Law 5,194, dated December 24, 1966, is based in Brasilia, and has about one million registered professionals in its Information System (SIC). Its mission is to act efficiently and effectively as the supreme body of verification, inspection and improvement of the exercise and professional activities of engineers, agronomists, geologists, geographers, meteorologists, technicians and technologists, always oriented towards the defense of citizenship and the promotion of sustainable development. The Confea watches over the social and human interests of the whole society, always with respect for the citizen and care for the environment. The Federal Council also has as its values integrity, ethics, excellence and transparency. In addition to the president, the Confea is organized as follows: plenary - composed of 18 advisers; standing committees; Evaluation and Articulation Committee; and board of directors. Its purposes and powers are set forth in Resolution No. 1,015, of June 30, 2006, Council Regulation.

== History ==
The Confea officially came out with that name on December 11, 1933, through Decree No. 23,569, promulgated by the then president of the Republic, Getúlio Vargas, and considered landmark in the history of professional and technical regulation in Brazil. In its current conception, the Federal Council of Engineering and Agronomy is governed by Law 5,194 of 1966, and also represents geographers, geologists, meteorologists, technologists of these modalities, industrial and agricultural technicians and their specializations, in a total of hundreds of professional titles. The Confea watches over the social and human interests of the whole society and, based on this, regulates and supervises the professional exercise of those who work in the areas it represents, with reference to respect for the citizen and nature. In its registers, the Confea / Crea System has registered around one million professionals who account for a considerable part of the Brazilian GDP, and move an increasingly demanding and demanding labor market in the specializations and knowledge of the technology, fed intensely by the technical discoveries And scientific aspects of man. The Federal Council is the maximum body to which a professional can appeal with regard to the regulation of professional practice.

== Areas of jurisdiction ==
This work is the one of a historical research, made from documents received and dispatched by the Federal Council, from 1934 to 1977, as well as diverse publications about them and Confea Resolutions. The study was developed in 1992, under our Coordination in quality, the time, of the Chief of the Documentation Department, with a significant contribution by the Historian Gustavo Ponce de Leon Soriano Lago. The rescue of the previous denominations of the Regional Councils of Engineering, Architecture and Agronomy is of fundamental importance to identify the origins of the documents produced by the Confea / Crea System and to keep registered part of this memory. We also point out that Confea has been constantly consulted on the previous denominations of Creas for various reasons, and this is also one of the justifications for this work. Eventually, inaccuracies in the work can be detected, which is why we request that the same be sent to the Confea, through the Management of Assistance to the Collegiate, so that we can make the necessary corrections.

== Confea organs ==
Confea's activities are led by a president, elected by the direct and secret vote of the professionals. In addition, the structure of the Federal Council has a Board of Directors, whose purpose is to assist the Plenary in the management of the House; An Evaluation and Articulation Board, which preliminarily analyzes the agenda of the plenary session, aiming at the effectiveness of the work; In addition to a Communication and Marketing Council, which aims to formulate and implement Confea's Editorial Policy. The Federal Council also has permanent committees and special commissions. The first assist the Plenary in matters within their competence. The latter meet specific transitional demands. Confea can also create working groups that aim to collect data and structure specific topics, with the aim of guiding the Confea bodies in solving issues and in establishing agreements.

=== Board of directors ===
Pursuant to Resolution No. 1,015, the board of directors has the purpose of assisting the Plenary in the management of Confea. It consists of the president and the vice president of the Federal Council, in addition to five directors. The officers are elected by the Plenary in the first ordinary session of each year.

=== Evaluation and Articulation Committee ===
According to Resolution No. 1,015 / 06, the Evaluation and Articulation Committee (CAA) aims to preliminarily analyze the agenda of the plenary sessions, in order to guarantee the effectiveness of the work. The competence of the CAA consists of discussing and adopting consensual measures on matters scheduled for consideration by the plenary. This committee is composed of the president and the vice-president of the Federal Council, as well as directors and coordinators of the permanent committees.

=== Communication and Marketing Council ===
The Communication and Marketing Council (CCM) aims to formulate and implement Confea's editorial policy. According to Resolution No. 1.015 / 2006, it is for the CCM to consider and resolve on the corporate communication plan Confea; Supervise the execution and evaluate the results of the implementation of the communication plan; Appreciate editorial projects for the media to be submitted to the Plenary for approval; And decide on programs, projects and actions submitted for its appreciation, in accordance with the communication plan.

== Presidency ==
José Tadeu da Silva Civil engineer José Tadeu da Silva was born in 1953, in Ouro Fino / MG, is married, father of four children. He graduated from Pontifical Catholic University - PUC of Campinas / SP, in 1976. For the Otávio Bastos Foundation, he graduated in Law in 1992, and also a lawyer. In addition to being an entrepreneur, José Tadeu works in the area of consulting, expertise, appraisals and engineering. He was a professor of materials resistance and stability of buildings at the Guaçuana Educational Foundation, a judicial expert in the Mogi Guaçu district and a councilor of the city council of the same municipality. He also served as vice-president and corregidor of the Ethics Corregidor And Parliamentary Decree of this Legislative House. He was also responsible for founding several Class Entities. Among them, the Association of Engineers and Architects of Mogi Guaçu (1982), the Society of Engineering, Architecture and Agronomy of Mogi Mirim (1990) and the Society of Engineering, Architecture and Agronomy of Itapira (1990). José Tadeu da Silva has already presided over the Federation of Engineering, Architecture and Agronomy Associations of the State of São Paulo (FAEASP) for three years (2000/2009), CRE-SP for two terms (2006/2008 and 2009/2011). He currently chairs the Brazilian Federation of Associations of Engineers - Febrae (2010/2015) and the Pan American Union of Engineers Associations - Upadi (2015/2016). He is also a member of the World Federation of Engineering Organizations (WFEO / FMOI). In 2011, he was elected to the presidency of Confea, with a mandate from January 1, 2012 to December 31, 2014, and re-elected in 2014 for a term from January 1, 2015 to December 31, 2017. In Its management, has developed actions in the national scenario to strengthen the Brazilian Engineering and the participation of professionals in the quotidian of the public policies that involve the technological areas. It has defended legality and transparency, guiding the activities of the Council with a focus on defending society and guaranteeing the sustainability of the Confea / Crea and Mútua System.

== Plenary ==
The purpose of the Confea Plenary is to assess and decide on matters related to the competencies of the Federal Council. It is constituted by a president and by 18 federal councilors, according to the provisions of specific regulations, being renewed annually in one third. It is the plenary that appreciates and decides on draft resolutions aimed at regulating and executing the law and on draft normative decision aimed at establishing understandings or determining procedures for unity of action of the Confe / Crea System. The Plenary also regulates integration issues with the state and society, the qualification and professional supervision, and economic and financial control; Appreciates and decides on the normative act of Crea, among several other competences. More information about the Plenary and its competence can be found in Rules of Confea, approved by Resolution No. 1.015 / 2006.

== Workgroups ==
Resolution No. 1,015 of June 30, 2006, which approves the Federal Council of Engineering, Architecture and Agronomy, created the possibility of having working groups to subsidize the execution of Federal actions.

=== Workgroups in force ===
Established by the Confea Plenary, the working groups deal with issues ranging from structural issues of the system and studies for changes in existing laws and regulations (such as shadowing assignments with other professions and advice and representation of mid-level technicians In plenary sessions) to sustainability and to bills of interest of professionals in the technological area.

=== Thematic commissions ===
Imposed in the Confea by Resolution No. 1060/2014, the thematic committees aim to collect data and study specific subjects, continuing nature, the aim of assisting the standing committees of Confea on relevant topics discussion that permeate the professions covered by Confea / Believe. Each thematic committee consists of no more than five members and each standing committee may set up at most three thematic committees. There are currently three thematic committees in place.

=== Special commissions ===
According to art. 4 of Resolution No. 1,015 of June 30, 2006, which approves the regiment of the Federal Council of Engineering, Architecture and Agronomy, to support the execution of its actions, Confea is advised by special commissions.
