= Universidade São Francisco =

University in Brazil

The Universidade São Francisco (USF; English: University of San Francisco) is a small university in Brazil, founded in 1976 by Franciscan priests.

It has campuses in four cities in the State of São Paulo: Bragança Paulista, Itatiba, Campinas, and São Paulo.
