= Clube do Hardware =

Brazilian website

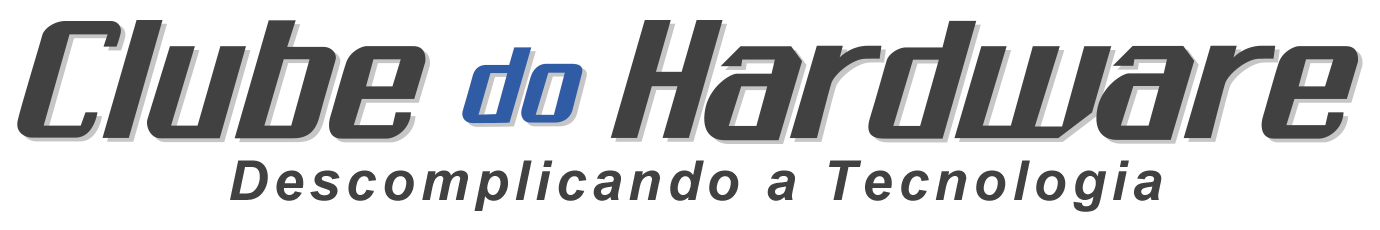
- Website type: Website/Internet forum
- Available in: Português
- Country of origin: Brazil
- Owner: Gabriel Torres
- Website: https://www.clubedohardware.com.br/
- Registration: Optional
- Launched: May 1996

Based in Brazil, Clube do Hardware (meaning "Hardware Club" in Brazilian Portuguese) is one of the largest websites about computers in South America, and also one of the biggest in the world. According to Alexa, as of 2018, Clube do Hardware is the 185th most accessed website in Brazil.

Clube do Hardware publishes tutorials, articles, reviews, and news about computer hardware and has an active forum where users can discuss technology topics.

It has an engaged community, with the largest Brazilian team at the Folding@Home project.

== History ==
It was created in 1996 by the Brazilian PC hardware expert Gabriel Torres, initially as a personal webpage on GeoCities with the title "Hardware by Gabriel Torres" as a portfolio of his work. In 1997 the author registered the domain gabrieltorres.com with the website, changing its name to "Hardware Site." The final name, Clube do Hardware, was adopted in 1999.
