= Haider Mahmoud =

Jordanian poet

- حيدر محمود
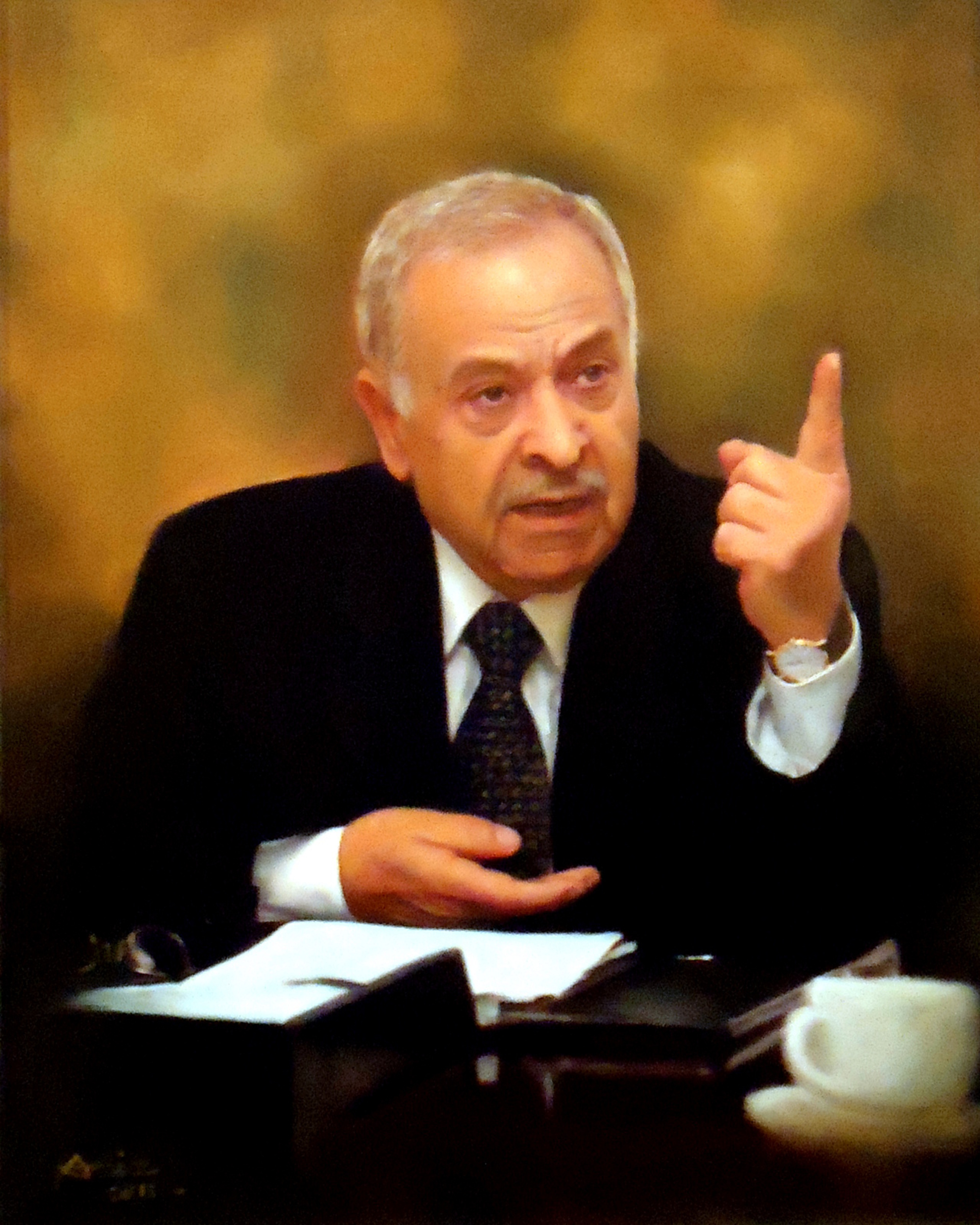

Member of the 27th Senate
- Incumbent
- Assumed office 27 September 2016

Minister of Culture
- In office 20 July 2003 – 22 October 2003

Minister of Culture
- In office 14 January 2002 – 20 July 2003

Ambassador to Tunisia
- In office 2 August 1991 – 31 December 1999

Personal details
- Born: 1942 (age 83–84) Haifa, Palestine
- Profession: Poet, Journalist

Haider Mahmoud (Arabic: حيدر محمود) is a poet and a Jordanian nationalist of Palestinian origin. He was born in Haifa in the British Mandate in 1942. His family fled their home in the aftermath of the 1948 Nakba. He studied in Amman before pursuing his higher education in the United Kingdom and the United States.

Mahmoud worked in journalism and the media, he was also Jordan's ambassador to Tunisia, and he later held the culture portfolio in the Jordanian government. He was appointed as a member of the 26th Senate of Jordan on 24 October 2013. He was reappointed to the 27th Senate on 27 September 2016.

A poem he wrote in early April 1989 about the social injustices facing ordinary citizens was one of the triggers of the civil unrest that took several Jordanian cities later that month. Mahmoud held the position of advisor to the prime minister at the time; he was sacked and ordered to be imprisoned by martial law decree, but was released on the same day by direct order from King Hussein.

Mahmoud's works were published in several languages, including Spanish, Japanese, Korean, French and Serbian, and his works are taught in the Jordanian curriculum in both the school and university levels. He was granted an honorary doctorate from the World Academy for Culture and Arts in the Republic of China in 1986.

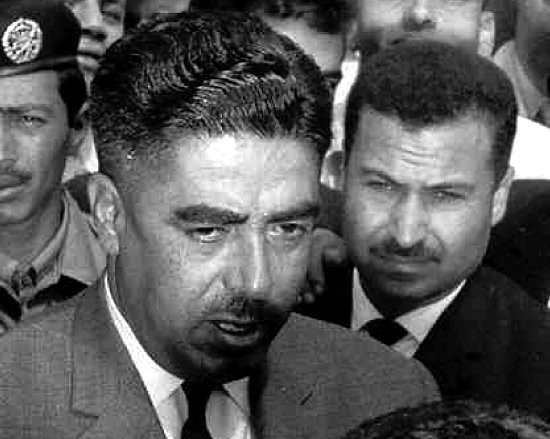
Former Jordanian Prime Minister Wasfi Al Tal, seen behind him is Chief Anchor at the Jordanian Radio, Haider Mahmoud, in the late 1960s

Mahmoud was granted several Arab and International awards and medals, including the King Abdullah II Award for Innovation in the Field of Literature (Jordan, 2004), The Independence Medal of First Order (Jordan, 1991), Medal of the Republic of the Supreme Order (Tunisia, 1999), Ibn Khafaja Award for Poetry (Spain, 1986).

He currently writes a weekly column in the Jordanian newspaper Ad-Dustour.

== Published anthologies ==
- Yamurru Hatha Al Layl (The Night Shall Pass) 1969.
- I'tithar An Khalal Fanni Tare'e (Apology for a Technical Fault) 1979.
- Shajar Addufla Ala Al Nahr Yughanni (The Oleander Sings by the River) 1981.
- Min Akwal Al Shahed Al Akheer (From the Words of The Last Witness) 1986.
- The Complete Works, (Vol I) 1990.
- Al Nar Allati La Tushbih Al Nar (The Fire Which is not Like Fire) 1999.
- The Complete Works (Vol II) 2000
- Aba'at Al Farah Al Akhdar (The Shawls of Green Joy) 2006.
- Fil Bid'e Kan Al Nahr (In The Beginning There was the River) 2007.

== Plays ==
- Arageel Wa Suyuf 1969.
- Birjas 1977.
