= Geisy Arruda =

Brazilian actress and businesswoman (born 1990)

Geisy Villanova Arruda
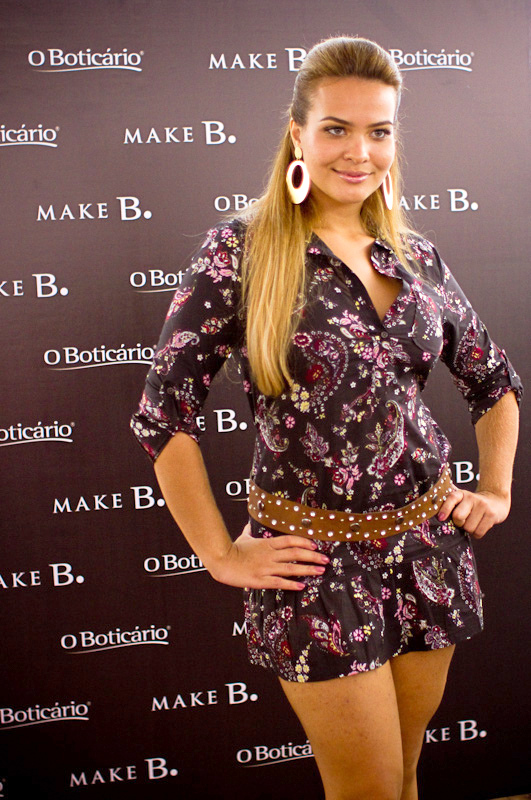
- Arruda in 2012
- Born: June 5, 1989 (age 36)
- Citizenship: Brazilian
- Occupations: actress, businesswoman
- Known for: while a student at Bandeirante University of São Paulo when her wearing a skirt caused a riot.

Geisy Villanova Arruda (born 5 June 1989 in Diadema, São Paulo, Brazil) is a Brazilian actress and businesswoman who became known while a student at Bandeirante University of São Paulo when her wearing a skirt caused a riot. Her eventual expulsion and readmittance was then followed by her decision to not return to the school.

== Biography ==
On October 22, 2009, Arruda, an undergraduate student in Tourism, went to school dressed in a short dress, which caused her to be harassed by some of her fellow students. This caused a backlash based on moral grounds and ended with the student being harassed and verbally attacked within the university. She was forced to leave the school grounds dressed in a jacket and escorted by police who dispersed the crowds with pepper spray. Videos of the incident were uploaded to YouTube causing national repercussions.

After the incident drew considerable national and international attention the actions of the university's students who harassed Arruda were denounced as sexist by the female wing of the Brazilian National Union of Students. The Order of Attorneys of Brazil asked for a public apology by UNIBAN to the student. Senators Valter Pereira and Eduardo Suplicy spoke out against the incident.

On November 7, 2009, the university used paid public announcement to declare that it had expelled Arruda from the university for "disrespecting ethical principles, academic dignity and morality." The university's decision was declared as sexist by the National Union of Students, which said that "the university was living in the caveman era" and believed the actions were very unusual.

On November 9, UNIBAN decided to reverse its decision. Arruda's lawyers nevertheless were unsatisfied citing that she had suffered from seven crimes: abuse, threats, defamation, false imprisonment, obscene acts from fellow students, embarrassment and incitement to crime. That same day, an investigation by the Delegation for the Defense of Women in the municipality of São Bernardo do Campo was commissioned to determine whether there had been libel.

Despite having the expulsion repealed, Arruda decided not to return to her university. This whole incident made her a national celebrity. With her new fame, Arruda appeared on many television shows, posed naked and participated in Carnival.

In 2016, she posed nude again for Sexy magazine, launched a cosmetics line and a fashion blog.

In 2022, she came out as bisexual.
