= Orlando Ribeiro =

Orlando Ribeiro may refer to:

- Orlando Ribeiro (geographer) (1911-1997), Portuguese geographer and historian
- Orlando Ribeiro (footballer) (born 1967), Brazilian football coach and former footballer
