= Escrever Cinema =

Escrever Cinema (English: Writing Cinema) was a Portuguese language film magazine published in Brazil. The magazine presented an auteurist view-points on film, and it featured articles written by many Brazilian film scholars extensively on cinema literature and film making. Its chief film critic was José Carlos Avellar.
