= Ele e Ela =

Brazilian men's magazine

- Categories: Men's
- Frequency: Monthly
- Publisher: Editora Manchete
- First issue: 1979
- Final issue: 2019
- Country: Brazil
- Language: Portuguese

Ele e Ela (transl. He and she) was a Brazilian men's magazine published by Editora Manchete. Founded by Adolpho Bloch in 1979, the magazine was published for nearly forty years and was popular in the 1970s and 1980s. It competed against the likes of magazines such as Playboy, Sexy and Status. One of the magazine's main attractions was the letters section, entitled Forum, which later became a prominent supplement to the magazine. It was sold alongside it, where the readers narrated their adventures and erotic fantasies. Several famous women's of that time had posed nude for the magazine, including Xuxa, Monique Evans, Rose di Primo and Luíza Brunet. In 2019, the printed version of Ele a Ela went out of circulation after 40 years, due to financial problems.

== See also ==
- Playboy (Brazil)
- Sexy (magazine)
