= Cultura Política =

Political and cultural magazine in Brazil (1941–1945)

- Categories: Political magazine Cultural magazine
- Publisher: Department of Press and Propaganda
- Founder: Almir de Andrade
- First issue: March 1941
- Final issue: October 1945
- Country: Brazil
- Based in: Rio de Janeiro
- Language: Portuguese

Cultura Política was a political and cultural magazine based in Rio de Janeiro, Brazil. It was one of the cultural apparatuses developed by the Estado Novo to diffuse the official ideology to the whole Brazilian society. It was in circulation between 1941 and 1945.

== History and profile ==
Cultura Política was established by Almir de Andrade in 1941. The first issue appeared in March 1941. The headquarters of the magazine was in Rio de Janeiro. The publisher was the department of press and propaganda. The magazine produced fifty issues during its lifetime, and was edited by Almir de Andrade. Some of its major contributors included Francisco Campos, Azevedo Amaral, Lourival Fontes, Cassiano Ricardo, Graciliano Ramos, Gilberto Freyre and Nelson Werneck Sodre. It ended publication in October 1945.
