= Problemas =

Monthly political magazine in Brazil (1947–1957)

Problemas (Portuguese: Problems) was a monthly political magazine published in Rio de Janeiro, Brazil. It was subtitled Revista Mensal de Cultura Política. The magazine was first published in August 1947. It was the official media outlet of the Brazilian Communist Party and was published by its central committee. Diogenes Arruda who was a member of the Communist Party's national secretary was the editor of the magazine. It included only translations of the articles from communist magazines without covering the events in Brazil. The magazine ceased publication in 1957.
