= Claudio Tognolli =

Brazilian journalist, musician and writer (1963–2024)

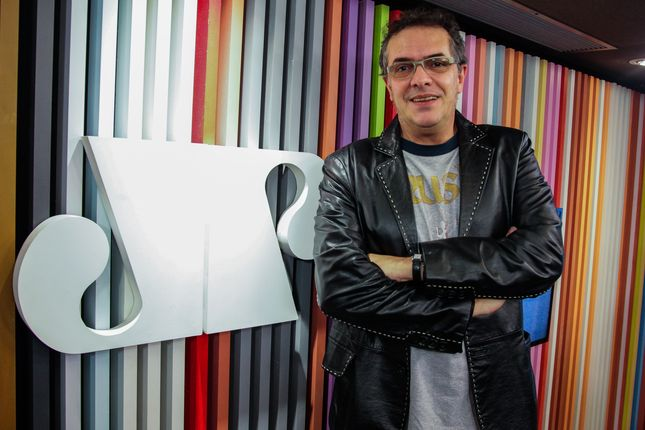
Claudio Tognolli

Claudio Júlio Tognolli (1963 – 3 March 2024) was a Brazilian journalist, musician and writer. He was a professor of journalism at the School of Communications and Arts of the University of São Paulo (Escola de Comunicações e Artes da Universidade de São Paulo, ECA/USP) and a board member at the Associação Brasileira de Jornalismo Investigativo.

Tognolli started his reporting career at Veja magazine. He followed with work on the newspapers Folha de S.Paulo, Jornal da Tarde, and on magazines Caros Amigos, Rolling Stone Brasil, Galileu, Joyce Pascowitch and Consultor Juridico. He has worked also at radio stations CBN, Jovem Pan and Eldorado. He was a co-founder of the news site Brasil 247.

One of his later books, Assassinato de Reputações, released on 11 December 2014, sold 120,000 copies in four months.

In April 2014, Tognolli was hired by Yahoo! to write an investigative journalism blog.

Tognolli died from complications from a heart transplant in São Paulo, on 3 March 2024, at the age of 60.

== Bibliography ==
- O Século do Crime (The Century of Crime) with José Arbex Jr. (Boitempo). ISBN 85-85934-09-3
- O Mundo Pós-Moderno (The Post-Modern World) (Scipione, 1997).
- A Sociedade dos Chavões (Escrituras). ISBN 85-7531-015-1
- Falácia Genética: a Ideologia do DNA (Genetic Fallacy: the DNA ideology) (Escrituras, 2003). ISBN 85-7531-109-3
- Mídia, Máfias and Rock n Roll (Editora do Bispo, 2007)
- 50 anos a mil, a biography of Lobão (Nova Fronteira/Ediouro, 2010)
- Milton Neves, uma biografia (Lazuli/Companhia Editora Nacional, 2013)
- Assassinato de Reputações (Topbooks, 2014)
- Ex-Agente Abre a Caixa Preta da ABIN (Escrituras, 2016)
- Assassinato de Reputações II - Muito Além da Lava Jato (Matrix, 2016)
