= Status (magazine) =

Brazilian men's magazine

- Categories: Men's
- Frequency: Monthly
- Publisher: Editora Três
- First issue: 1974
- Final issue: late 1980's 2015
- Country: Brazil
- Language: Portuguese

Status was a Brazilian men's magazine launched in 1974 by Editora Três. The magazine stopped its circulation during the late 1980s but was relaunched in 2011, with a different approach in its artistic nude images compared to its competitors. Its circulation was stopped in October 2015. During its first period of existence, some of the most famous women in Brazil at the time had posed nude for the magazine such as Sonia Braga, Sandra Bréa, Vera Fischer, Fafá de Belém, Bruna Lombardi and Zezé Motta among the others.

== History ==
The first issue of the magazine came out in August 1974 with a photo shoot of actress Sylvia Kristel and also featured actress Tânia Caldas on its cover. This edition came out with the restrictions imposed by the military, which established prior censorship of any magazine or book that contained nude photos or drawings of women. The photographs of both breasts and genital parts of women were totally prohibited. Photos would only be allowed with the exposure of only one breast. From February 1980 onwards, censorship was canceled and in the March 1980 edition, there was a special edition, called “Uncensored” with 100 pages presenting the photos that had been censored until then. The magazine ended up succumbing to competition from Playboy and other magazines dedicated to explicit sex, ceasing its circulation at the late 1980s.

In April 2011, the magazine was relaunched by the same publisher, with a new visual and content proposal, featuring supermodel Fernanda Tavares. The initial edition of the relaunch had a circulation of one hundred thousand copies and contained more than 60 pages of advertising. The magazine was circulated until the circulation was stopped in October 2015.
