= Stephen Dwoskin =

Experimental filmmaker (1939–2012)

- Born: January 15, 1939; New York City, US
- Died: June 28, 2012 (aged 73); London, UK
- Education: Parsons The New School for Design; New York University
- Known for: Film

Stephen Dwoskin (15 January 1939 – 28 June 2012) was an avant-garde filmmaker whose work was closely connected to the 'gaze theory' associated with Laura Mulvey; a significant disabled filmmaker – though he rejected being framed as such – and an activist for an alternative film culture, through such organizations as the London Film-Makers' Co-op and The Other Cinema. His films are held by the BFI and distributed by LUX. His archive is held at The University of Reading.

== Early life ==
Dwoskin was born in Brooklyn in 1939. At the age of nine he contracted polio and underwent a gruelling rehabilitation that entailed confinement in an iron lung, muscle transplants and relearning to walk, painfully, with crutches. He spent four years in hospital before he was discharged. Dwoskin used crutches for much of his life. Poliomyelitis progressively restricted his mobility and in later life he used a wheelchair.

He studied at Parsons The New School for Design, where his teachers included Willem de Kooning and Josef Albers, then at New York University. While working as a graphic designer and art director, including a stint at CBS and Epic Records, he began making short experimental films in 1961, and became part of the bohemian world of New York 'underground' filmmakers around Jonas Mekas. He received a Fulbright Scholarship to spend a year in London in 1964; in the event he remained there until his death.

== Career ==
Dwoskin became a key figure in British avant-garde film. He was a co-founder of the London Film-Makers' Co-op in 1966, along with his friend the critic Raymond Durgnat and others. In the late 1960s, after making his name at the 1967 Knokke experimental film festival, his films became staples of the underground scene, and were shown at festivals and by the New Cinema Club as well as the LFMC.

In the 1970s he began making longer films, starting with Times For (1970), whose cast included the American performance artist and filmmaker Carolee Schneemann. Times For also inaugurated the series of films he made with soundtracks by Gavin Bryars. His second feature, Dyn Amo (1972), shot in a Soho strip club, with a cast including Jenny Runacre, was praised in the nascent second-wave feminist press and shown at the Electric Cinema Club.

At about this time Dwoskin became associated with The Other Cinema, a distribution collective that handled films from British independents, Third World filmmakers, and European films too way out for the art-house circuit. In 1977 he collaborated on a BBC documentary about its impending demise. A number of his films from the early 1970s onwards, including Behindert (1974), the first to deal explicitly with his life as a disabled man, were made for the German broadcaster ZDF.

Around 1980 Dwoskin was a co-founder of the film collective Spectre, intended to produce films for Channel 4, that included Vera Neubauer, Simon Hartog, Anna Ambrose, Michael Whyte, John Ellis, Phil Mulloy, Thaddeus O'Sullivan and Keith Griffiths. In 1984 Anna Ambrose made a documentary about Dwoskin for Channel 4, featuring Mulvey, Durgnat, and others, that was shown as part of a season of his films.

During the 1980s Dwoskin turned to making personal documentaries: Shadows from Light (1983), about the photographer Bill Brandt, and Ballet Black (1986), about the pioneering Black British dance troupe Les Ballets Nègres. Face of our Fear, a film that addresses attitudes about disability, was commissioned by Channel Four, UK, and broadcast in 1992.

In 1994 Dwoskin made the autobiographical film Trying to Kiss the Moon, using home movies his father had shot before he contracted polio. His next commissioned film, Pain Is (1997), made for Arte/ZDF, was his last; Dwoskin, an avowed avant-gardist, was never an easy fit for television, and the medium was becoming increasingly format-led.

In 2000 Dwoskin returned to the underground with Intoxicated By My Illness, the first of his films to be made with digital technology. This inaugurated an extraordinary run of neo-underground films, championed in particular by the French magazine Trafic and its editor Raymond Bellour, culminating in The Sun and the Moon, a version of the 'Beauty and the Beast' story, made in 2007 with Helga Wretman, Dwoskin's longstanding collaborator Beatrice 'Trixie' Cordua-Schönherr, and Dwoskin himself.

Dwoskin wrote two books: Film Is..., about underground/experimental/avant-garde cinema, in 1975 (published by Peter Owen, UK and Overlook Press, US), and Ha Ha!, a mixture of text and collaged photographs, inspired by the founder of 'Pataphysics Alfred Jarry, in 1993 (published by The Smith, New York).

He was a respected teacher and lecturer, holding positions at London College of Printing and Royal College of Art, London; San Francisco Art Institute and San Francisco State University, USA; University of Geneva and l'École Supérieure d'Art Visuel, Switzerland.

Dwoskin's films have been screened worldwide including festivals at Cannes, Berlin, Rotterdam, Toronto, Lucarno, Pesaro, Mannheim, Oberhausen, Sydney, Melbourne, Hamburg, San Francisco, Turin, Riga, Madrid, Barcelona, and Benalmádena amongst other places.

Retrospectives of his work have been held in New York, London, Madrid, Barcelona, Paris, Brussels, San Francisco, Geneva, Lucerne, Digne, Berlin, Marseille (1995), Bilbao (1996), Strasbourg (2002), Paris/Pantin (2004), Rotterdam (2006), Lucca (2006), Bruxelles (2006), Lussas (2008), London (2009), and Berlin (2009).

Awards include the L'Âge d'or prize, awarded by the Brussels Film Festival 1982, the prestigious DAAD Fellowship (Berlin) in 1974, and the Rockefeller Media Fellowship in 1994.

Dwoskin's work is represented in London by Vilma Gold gallery. His work and archive was part of an AHRC-funded research project (2018-2021), based at the University of Reading.

== Filmography ==
- Asleep (1961)
- American Dream (1961)
- Alone (1963/6)
- Naissant (1964/6)
- Chinese Checkers (1964/6)
- Soliloquy (1964/7)
- Me Myself and I (1967/8)
- Take Me (1968/9)
- Moment (1969/70)
- Trixi (1970/1)
- To Tea (1970)
- C-Film (1970)
- Times For (1970)
- Dirty (1971)
- Dyn Amo (1972)
- Girl (1972)
- Jesus' Blood Never Failed Me Yet (1972)
- Tod und Teufel (1973)
- Behindert (1974)
- Laboured Party (1975)
- Just Waiting (1975)
- Kleiner Vogel (1976)
- Central Bazaar (1973/6)
- Silent Cry (1977)
- Outside In (1981)
- Shadows from Light (1983)
- Ballet Black (1986)
- Further and Particular (1988)
- The Spirit of Brendan Behan (1990)
- Face Anthea (1990)
- Face of Our Fear (1992)
- Trying to Kiss the Moon (1994)
- Pain Is... (1997)
- Video Letter (with Robert Kramer) (1991-2000)
- Another Time (2002)
- Some Friends (apart) (2002)
- Intoxicated By My Illness (2001)
- Dear Frances (In Memorium) (2003)
- Dad (2003)
- Lost Dream (2003)
- Grandpere's Pear (2003)
- Visitors (2004)
- Oblivion (2005)
- Nightshots 1,2,3 (2006/7)
- The Sun and the Moon (2007)
- Phone Strip (2007)
- Phone Portrait (2007)
- Mom (2008)
- Ascolta! (2008)
- Dream House (2009)
- Age Is... (2012)
