= Criticism of TV Globo =

Brazilian television network controversy

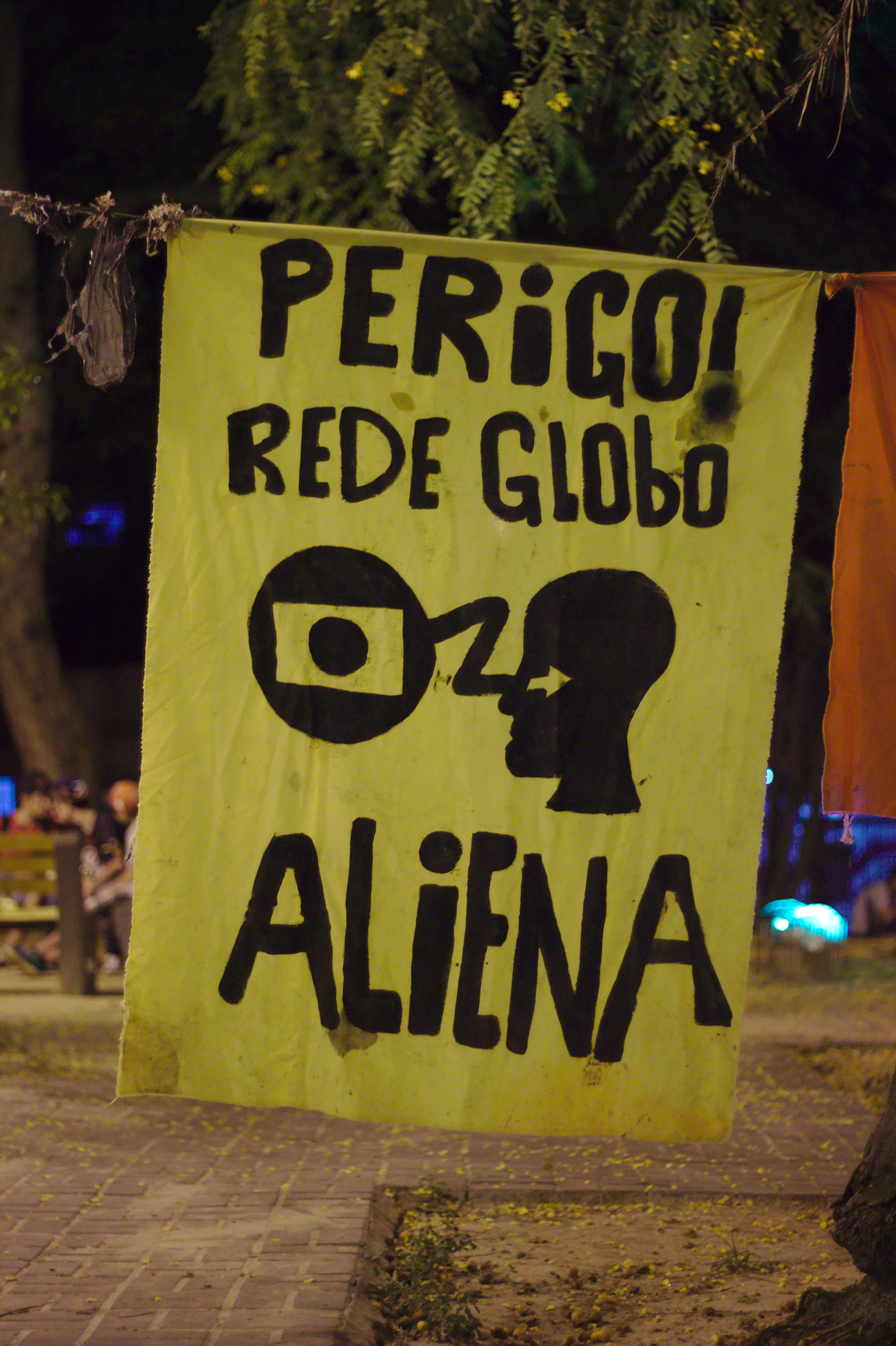
Banner criticizing Rede Globo at a protest in 2014, which translates to "Danger! Rede Globo alienates"

Criticism of TV Globo (formerly Rede Globo) refers to the history of controversy concerning TV Globo, the television division of the media conglomerate Grupo Globo, owned by media proprietor Roberto Marinho. TV Globo was founded on April 26, 1965, just over one year after the Brazilian coup d'état by the Brazilian Armed Forces, and operated under the new military dictatorship in Brazil until March 15, 1985. TV Globo was criticized for censorship of pro-democracy broadcasting. In 2013, TV Globo apologised for its support of the military junta in the 1964 Brazilian coup d'état.

== Time-Life ==
Although Marinho acquired a broadcast license in 1957, it was a contract with Time Life Television that allowed Rede Globo network to enter and expand in the Brazilian television market. Time-Life offered financial and technical support in return for a share of Rede Globo profits. Marinho's competitors argued this was unjust because it broke Brazil's constitutional laws concerning foreign media ownership. An inquiry found the laws had been broken and Time Life Television was paid out. Marinho was not convicted.

== Marinho's support for the military junta ==
"We took part in the 1964 Revolution, identified with the national desire to preserve democratic institutions, felt threatened by radical ideology, strikes, social disorder and corruption everywhere. When our newsroom was invaded by anti-revolutionary troops, we were firm in our position. We proceeded to support the victorious movement since the first moments of course corrections until the opening process, which should cement with the inauguration of the new president."

— Roberto Marinho, in the newspaper O Globo, edition 1596, October 7, 1984

In 2013, TV Globo news presenter, William Bonner read on-air during the national evening news, the Jornal Nacional, a formal public apology for Groupo Globo's support of the 1964 coup.

He read, "In the light of history, ... there is no reason not to acknowledge, today, explicitly, that the support for the 1964 coup was a mistake, as well as other wrong editorial decisions in the period elapsed since that original mistake. Democracy is an unconditional value. And, when in risk, it can only be saved by itself."

In refuting the accusation that Groupo Globo was pro-military rule, the group cited the difficulty in obtaining television licenses in João Pessoa and Curitiba in 1978; government censoring of its programming; and the presence of communists amongst its employees.

== Government influence ==
Walter Clark, who was a general manager of Rede Globo, wrote in his autobiography that Rede Globo was heavily controlled by the government. For example, at the direction of Rio de Janeiro's chief of police, he had cancelled the programs of Carlos Heitor Cony, a journalist, and Roberto Campos, an economist.

An advisory committee was convened to scrutinize Rede Globo's material. The committee included Paiva Chave and Edgardo Manoel Erikson, both generals. The military president Emílio Garrastazu Médici visited Clark on Sundays to watch football with him. According to Clark, the so-called "Globo standard of quality ended up "going through the looking-glass" of a regime which the Rede Globo professionals never agreed with".

In interviews made for the British documentary film Beyond Citizen Kane (1993), the minister for finance in the military junta, Armando Falcão said, "Roberto Marinho never gave me any problems. When I was the minister in charge of censorship and he was the director of the TV Globo network, Radio Globo, Radio Mundial and Radio Eldorado, he never gave me any trouble."

== Diretas Já protest ==
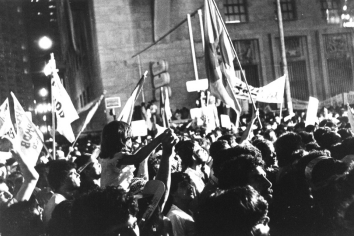
Diretas Já rally on 16 April 1984 in São Paulo

On 25 January 1984, the Rede Globo network broadcast the first large rally of the Diretas Já movement from the Praça da Sé public square of São Paulo. Rede Globo's Jornal Nacional program had planned a segment on the protests, lasting two minutes and seventeen seconds. However, there was a miscommunication during the transmission to the Jornal Nacional. 25 January was the foundation date of São Paulo and so the news reader assumed the vision to be broadcast was part of the city's 430th anniversary celebrations. Rede Globo was accused of manipulating the facts.

José Bonifácio de Oliveira Sobrinho, known as Boni, the former vice president of Grupo Globo, commented on this during an interview with journalist Roberto D'Ávila in 2005. He confirmed that Roberto Marinho suppressed the coverage of the first large rally of the Diretas Já movement. Sobrinho said, "Mr. Roberto did not want mention of Diretas Já" and the event in Praça da Sé would be reported, "without any participation of any of the dissenters". This was in line with the demand of the government censors. The veracity of these facts is rejected in the book, Jornal Nacional - A Notícia Faz História.

== Proconsult scheme ==
The Proconsult scheme was an alleged attempt to interfere with the Rio de Janeiro gubernatorial election of 1982 to prevent the election of Leonel Brizola, candidate for the Democratic Labour Party (PDT). On the eve of the election, O Globo published an editorial favourable to Brizola's opponent, Moreira Franco. The Proconsult company was engaged by the Brazilian Election Commission to use their computer system to tally the votes. It was alleged that the company awarded all blank, invalid, null, and hanging chad votes to Franco. Furthermore, the Proconsult result did not match an independent exit poll conducted by the newspaper Jornal do Brasil. O Globo did not challenge the count.

Journalist at the Tribuna da Imprensa newspaper Hélio Fernandes reported that Maoel Vidal of the Rio de Janeiro Police, as an independent scrutineer, noticed irregularities in the count. Critics allege Groupo Globo influenced the result by reporting counts calculated from electoral map aggregate votes.

== Purchase of NEC stock ==
Prior to the 1964 coup, the Nippon Electric Company (NEC) was a major supplier of telecommunications equipment to Brazil. Afterwards, when NEC needed to nationalise the stock of its subsidiary NEC Brazil, it ceded shareholder control of the company to Mário Garnero's private equity firm, Brasilinvest.

On 18 March 1985, the Central Bank of Brazil initiated the liquidation of Brasilinvest. Garnero was accused of insufficient liquidity and embezzlement. Garnero was unsuccessful in securing a preventive concordat to avoid insolvency. On 29 April 1986, Minister of Communications Antônio Carlos Magalhães suspended government contracts with Garnero's companies. In response to Brasilinvest's fall, NEC re-purchased part of the NEC Brazil stock.

In December 1986, the Brasilinvest stock was sold. Grupo Globo purchased 51% of the holdings and Garnero kept 25% as preferred stock. NEC purchased 58% of the stock (16% common shares and 42% preferred shares). Government contracts with NEC continued.

In May 1987, Congressman Paulo Ramos sought a commission of enquiry to investigate the sale of NEC Brazil shares to Rede Globo via Garnero. On 17 November 1987, the commission found no fault of Magalhães. The president of the commission, Mussa Demes of the Partido da Frente Liberal party said, "If Governor Antônio Carlos had acted differently, he would have irrevocably compromised the country's telecommunications system and could be answering today for omission [in his responsibilities]". This was in light of the government having suspended contracts with NEC to prevent Garnero using government resources to stop the liquidation of Brasilinvest.

The state-owned telecommunications company, Telebrás, was broken up and privatised in 1999. The new entities continued their affiliations with western companies for their technological needs. NEC Brazil shares were less attractive and Grupo Globo sold their holdings.

== TV Aratu ==
On 10 November 1986, Rede Globo cancelled its long-standing contract with TV Aratu, a station in Bahia. TV Aratu ceased broadcasting Rede Globo content on 20 January 1987. TV Bahia, an entity owned by the family of Minister for Communications Antônio Carlos Magalhães, replaced TV Aratu. On 13 January 1987, Congressman Luís Viana Neto, a shareholder in TV Aratu, went to president José Sarney to complain about Magalhãe's apparent conflict of interest.

On 15 January 1987, Judge Luiz Fux provided TV Aratu an injunction on TV Bahia's retransmission of the Rede Globo programming, however, it was dismissed 6 days later. Legal proceedings continued until 6 July 1987 with no success for TV Aratu. Without Rede Globo's programming, TV Aratu's ratings fell by 80%. In 1996, its assets were sold to pay its legal fees.

== 1989 election debate ==
Journalist Ricardo Noblat suggested Rede Globo had been biased in its reporting of the 1989 election by favouring the presidential candidate, Fernando Collor de Mello. Collor owned TV Gazeta, a Rede Globo affiliate broadcasting in Alagoas. Allegedly, Rede Globo manipulated segments of the pre-recorded final debate before the runoffs between Collor de Mello and Luiz Inácio Lula da Silva of the Workers' Party. Before the debate, polling suggested the two candidates were equal in the presidential race. When Lula lost, the Worker's Party concluded the televised debate was a confounding factor.

Initially, Rede Globo sought to recuse itself from the mandatory full coverage of the election. However, it went ahead when the tie between candidates became evident. On 15 December 1989, on the eve of the runoff voting, Rede Globo broadcast TV news reports on Jornal Hoje (News Today) and on Jornal Nacional (National News). The Jornal Nacional report was the more controversial of the two, highlighting the better of Collor's moments and the weaker of Lula's. The Workers' Party applied to the courts to invoke the right of reply article of the Brazilian Constitution and have parts of the debate re-broadcast but was unsuccessful.

Rede Globo agreed the broadcast of the debate was not balanced but denied it being intentional. In 2009, Collor said he had been favoured in the debate broadcast by Rede Globo in the contest. However, despite his success in the election, by 1992 Collor had been impeached for receiving kickbacks from the corporate sector.

== Defamation of Leonel Brizola ==
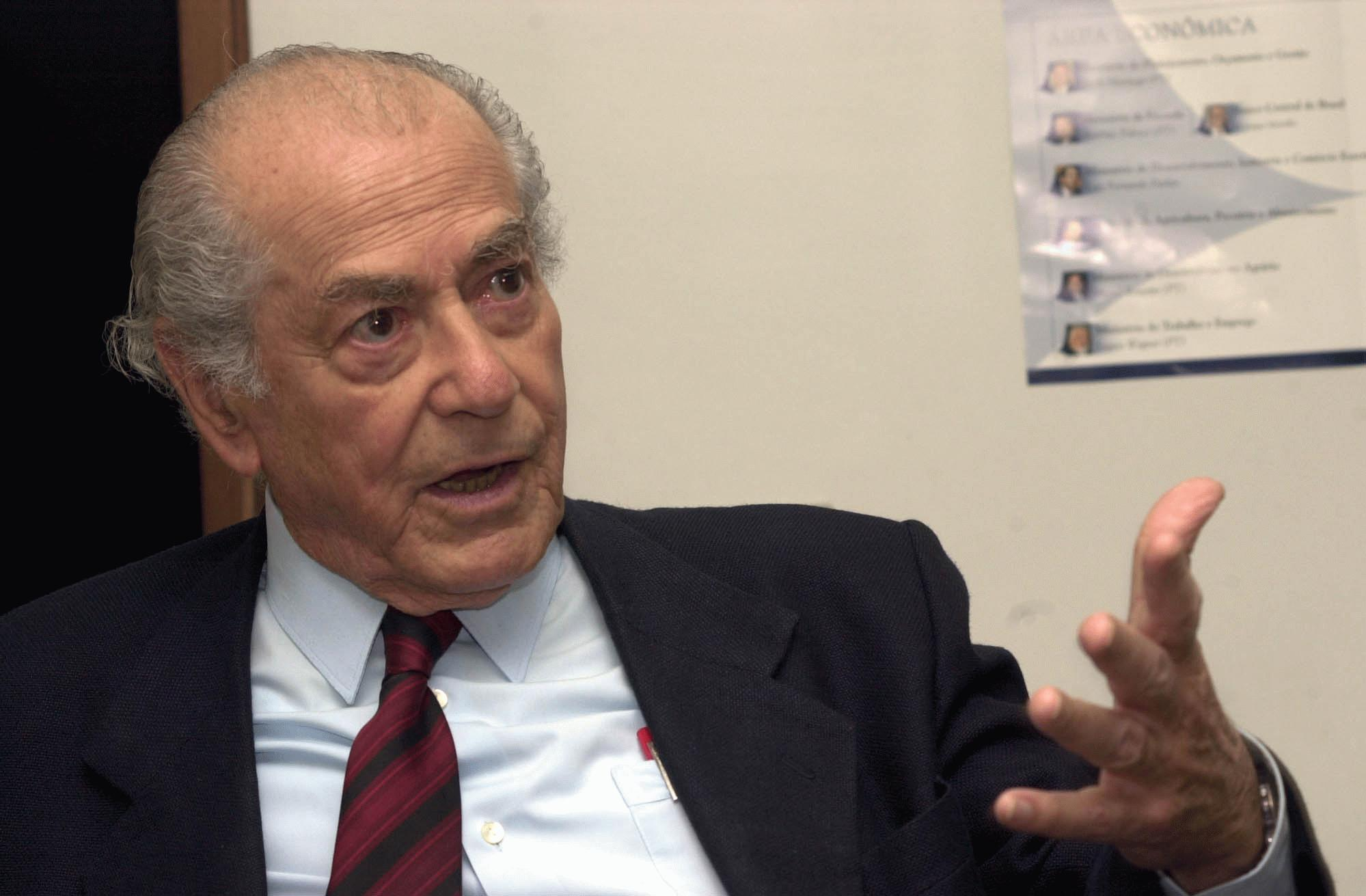
Governor Leonel Brizola received the right of reply in the TV news program Jornal Nacional after a two-year legal battle.

In 1992, Leonel Brizola was the governor of Rio de Janeiro. Brizola had given the broadcasting rights for the 1992 Brazilian Carnival parade in Rio de Janeiro to Rede Globo's competitor, Rede Manchete. On 6 February 1992, O Globo published an editorial piece entitled "Understanding Brizola's Rage" which implied he was suffering from "declining mental health" and "management ineptitude".

In March 1994, under judicial order, Jornal Nacional aired Brizola's right of reply. Brizola made a written response which was read on-air by the news reader, Cid Moreira. Brizola said he did not recognize Grupo Globo as an "authority in matters of freedom of the press" and that the media empire had a "long and friendly relationship with the authoritarian regime and with the 20-year dictatorship that had ruled our country". He said, "Now, I am 70 years-old, 16 less than my slanderer, Roberto Marinho, who is 86 years old. If this is your notion of men of a certain age, then apply it to yourself".

== 2006 election ==
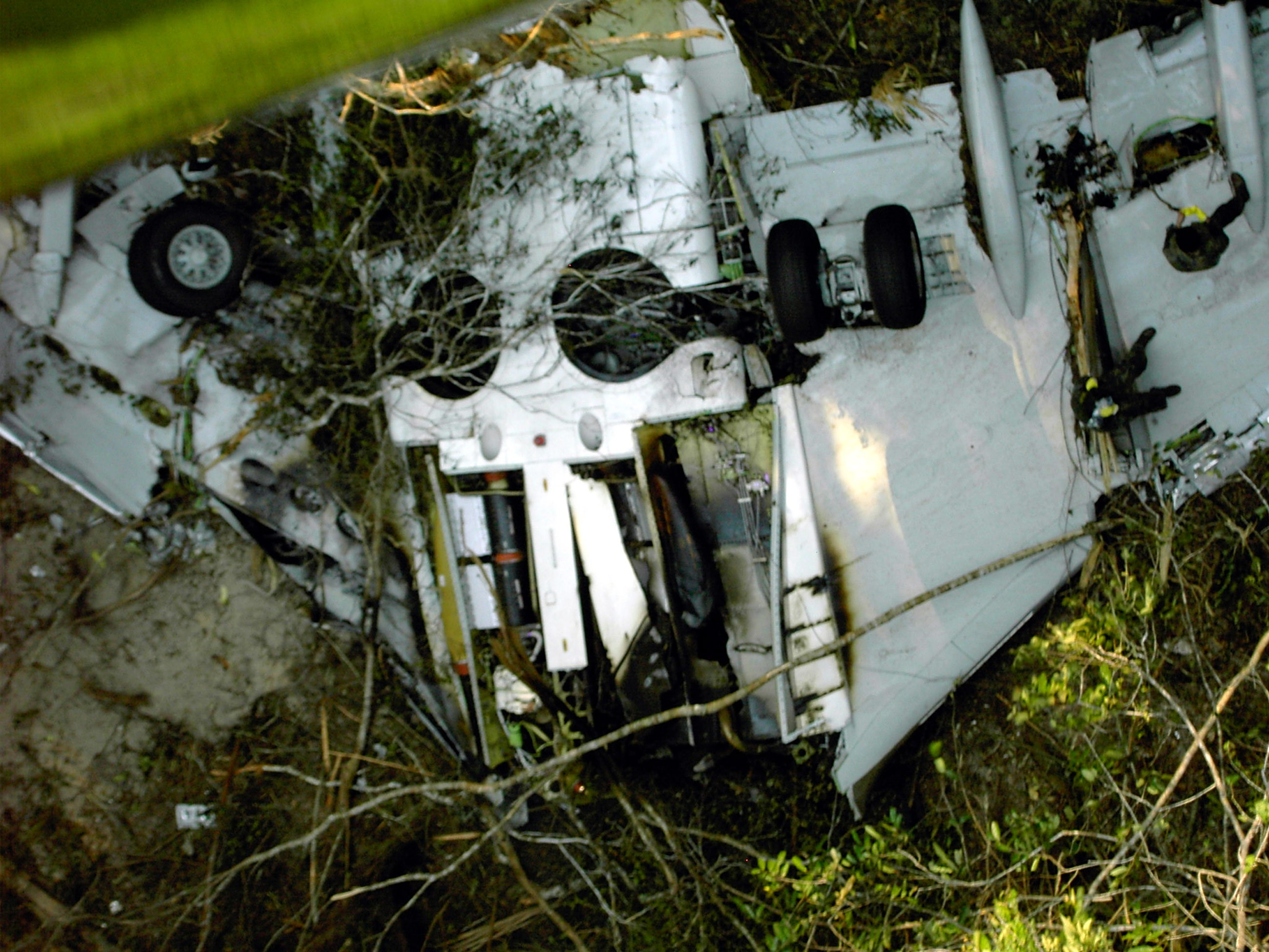
According to CartaCapital magazine, the Jornal Nacional TV news program did not cover the crash of Gol Flight 1907, but instead focused the whole episode on the Dossiêgate scandal.

Rede Globo provided coverage of the 2006 Brazil election. The broadcaster was accused of reporting in a way that was biased against the re-election campaign of the president Luiz Inácio Lula da Silva. Rede Globo reporter Luiz Carlos Azenha gave the examples of economic reports favouring Lula being omitted from broadcasts and his negative report about José Serra being censored by Rede Globo.

=== Gol Flight 1907 ===
On the eve of the first round of voting, 29 September 2006, Gol Transportes Aéreos Flight 1907 crashed after a mid-air collision killing all 154 people on board. Rede Globo did not focus on the tragic event. Instead, Jornal Nacional spent the program reporting about the "Dossiêgate" scandal. This scandal involved members of the Working Party were discovered paying cash for information that was critical to the candidates José Serra and Geraldo Alkmin.

On the same day, an officer of the Brazil federal police invited four Rede Globo journalists to a private meeting and audio recorded the event. He passed to the journalists compact discs containing photographs of the members of the Working Party and the cash they used to purchase the dossier of information. The officer was heard on the recording asking the journalists to broadcast the images that evening on Jornal Nacional. Rede Globo responded to their lack of coverage of the aeroplane crash.

The rumors that the Gol plane did not arrive on time in Brasília got to Jornal Nacional newsroom around 20:10, when the TV program was already on-air. From these rumors, a frantic race was initiated to verify what exactly had happened to the airplane, in order to avoid creating public panic. The first confirmation was, in fact, that the Gol plane that had disappeared since 18:10, but the Infraero would not confirm the route or the flight number. Without this information, it was impossible to divulge any information about the missing plane, without causing great distress to all those who had relatives or friends flying Gol. It was not just a few flights: on September 29th, 2006, 54 Gol aircraft took off. Each one could take up to 144 passengers; with an average occupancy of 80% of the seats. Gol calculates that it flew 6,200 people that day. Not divulging the flight number or the route would put all 54 flights under suspicion, a decision that a TV news program leader in ratings, watched by millions, could not take. While on-air, until 20:45, neither Jornal Nacional or any other TV news program from other networks got this information.

— Rede Globo's explanation for its lack of coverage.

== 2010 election ==
=== Anniversary promotion ===
On 18 April 2010, Rede Globo launched a marketing campaign celebrating the 45th anniversary of its news magazine television program Fantástico. The date of Rede Globo's 45th anniversary was 26 April 2010. In the commercials, the network's logo appeared next to the number 45. Soap opera actors recited the line, "we all want more" and "we all want more education, health, and, of course, love and peace. Brazil? Much more". As it happened, 45 was the registration number of the Brazilian Social Democracy Party at the Superior Electoral Court of Brazil.

André Luís Vargas Ilário, congressman from Paraná state and the press secretary for the Workers' Party at the time, said the advertisement was a jibe at the Workers' Party, whose campaign slogan was "Brazil can be more". Rede Globo ceased broadcasting the advertisement on the first day of the 45th company anniversary campaign. The network said the advertisement was created in November 2009, when "candidate's campaigns did not exist, let alone slogans, but Rede Globo will not give excuses for accusations of bias and it is suspending the ad".

=== José Serra assault ===
During the second round campaign of the 2010 election, video was recorded of José Serra being hit in the head with a ball of paper and later a roll of duct tape. The duct tape was thrown by Worker's Party supporters in Rio de Janeiro. A CT scan of Serra's head found no injury.

Rede Globo reported the paper ball incident but not the duct tape ball incident, giving the impression that Serra was exaggerating the significance of the impact of the projectile. On 21 October 2010, the Folha de S.Paulo newspaper, which is independent of Rede Globo, confirmed that Serra was hit by a roll of duct tape after the paper ball. Sistema Brasileiro de Televisão (SBT) confirmed the information on its television news program, SBT Brasil.

[...] there was no dispute between SBT and Rede Globo about the paper ball. Throughout the affair, the credit is due to Folha de S.Paulo in all fairness. It was the newspaper who first reported the attack on Serra with a roll of duct tape. It was the newspaper who put on the Internet a video of the moment of aggression. The Jornal Nacional, in an independent report, confirmed the findings of Folha.

— Rede Globo's comment about the incident

== 2012 municipal elections ==
Fernando Haddad was the 2012 São Paulo mayoral election Worker's Party candidate. Each evening, Rede Globo broadcast the propaganda eleitoral gratuita (free electoral program). Haddad's campaign spot was at the end of the program. The program was followed each evening by Jornal Nacional, which was reporting events in the Mensalão scandal, a corruption trial involving the Workers' Party.

== 2013 protests ==
In 2013, a number of political demonstrations occurred in towns across Brazil. They concerned many different concerns including increasing cost of living, political corruption and deficiencies in public services. Some of the demonstrations occurred in front of the stations of Rede Globo. Manure was thrown at the network's headquarters in São Paulo and its walls were defaced. At the Rede Globo headquarters in Rio de Janeiro, protestors clashed with police. Protests against Rede Globo were organised via online social networks and community organizations.

On 19 June 2013, the Rede Globo editorial response to the protests was read on Jornal Nacional by Patrícia Poeta. The following day, Rede Globo changed its programming schedule to cover the demonstrations. This included the broadcasting of one of the matches of the 2013 FIFA Confederations Cup being cancelled. Episodes of the soap operas Flor do Caribe and Sangue Bom were also cancelled. The editor of the online news and opinion site RINF opined that the Rede Globo reporting focused overly on acts of vandalism during the protests.

== 2014 elections ==
On 8 August 2014, two months before the 2014 elections, an article was published in O Globo that a device connected to the internet through the wireless network of the Palácio do Planalto, the official office of the President of Brazil, had changed information in the Portuguese Wikipedia pages of the Rede Globo journalists Miriam Leitão and Carlos Alberto Sardenberg with the intention of defamation.

The edits, made in May 2013, targeted Leitão because on Grupo Globo's Rádio CBN she defended Daniel Dantas, a businessman who had been arrested for white-collar crime. Dantas was later acquitted. Sardenberg was targeted for a presumed conflict of interest in his reporting on federal interest rate policy. His brother was working for the Brazilian Federation of Banks, a business association of private banks. The Wikipedia edits were made by a civil servant who was later dismissed. The left-leaning website, Vermhelo, opined that Grupo Globo should not have reported the edits to the Wikipedia pages because it was unverified information and, at the same time, that the information should have been reported earlier than August as that month was within the campaign season.

== 2013 protests and Dilma's impeachment ==
During the wave of popular demonstrations that took place in various Brazilian cities in 2013, protests were held outside the broadcaster's headquarters across the country. Manure was thrown at the façade of the company's São Paulo headquarters, and its walls were defaced with graffiti. During the protest at the broadcaster's headquarters in Rio de Janeiro, demonstrators clashed with the police.

In a commentary aired on June 12 on *Jornal da Globo*, filmmaker and journalist Arnaldo Jabor stated that the vast majority of the protesters were middle-class youths and that the demonstrations stemmed from political ignorance and were spurred by the 2013 protests in Turkey. Adopting a provocative tone, Jabor questioned why they were not fighting against PEC 37—a cause he considered more legitimate. He concluded by suggesting that the protesters might not even know what PEC 37 is and were not even worth the 0.20-real fare hike.. On the 17th, during his segment on the CBN radio station, he apologized for his remarks, stating that he had feared energy would be wasted on a trivial issue but realized the problem was much larger.

During the impeachment process of Dilma Rousseff, Globo was accused of bias by the magazine *CartaCapital*.

=== Censorship imposed on TV Globo ===
In November 2018, the homicide division of the Brazilian Civil Police and the Public Prosecutor's Office of Rio de Janeiro filed a lawsuit seeking to bar TV Globo from disclosing any information regarding the police investigation into the murder of City Councilwoman Marielle Franco and her driver, Anderson Gomes. Gustavo Gomes Kalil, the judge of Rio de Janeiro's 4th Criminal Court, granted the request, arguing that TV Globo was leaking case file contents in a "harmful" manner, thereby exposing details of the investigation and the identities of witnesses. However, the data released by TV Globo up to that point had been reported without disclosing personal information, with some being presented anonymously. TV Globo stated that the court ruling was excessive and severely infringed upon freedom of the press.

The Brazilian Association of Investigative Journalism (Abraji) issued a statement: "Abraji considers the judge's decision a violation of Brazilians' right to the free flow of information of public interest. Imposing censorship is an affront to the Constitution. Freedom of the press, fundamental to democracy, should be safeguarded by all levels of the judiciary, yet it is frequently disregarded by judges whose rulings are—months or years later—overturned by higher courts. In the interim, citizens' right to be informed is suspended, causing irreparable harm to society. The case in question exemplifies this absurd practice, which must end. It is the duty of the judiciary to uphold constitutional rights, not to undermine them."

== Vaza jato ==
Lava jato (operation car wash) was an anti-corruption operation which began in 2014 with an investigation into money laundering in a car washing business. It uncovered widespread corruption in major entities, both public and corporate, in Brazil and abroad and in politics. Sergio Moro was the judge leading prosecutions.

Vaza jato (car wash leaks) was a play on words suggesting a leaking car wash and referring to leaking of information from Moro's office to the press. The origin of the leak was conversations taking place on the Telegram application software for text and audio messaging, which was launched in 2013.

Glenn Greenwald, an American lawyer, journalist and blogger, reported this in The Intercept, an American not for profit internet news outlet. A hacker had intercepted the Telegram conversations and gave the information to Greenwald. Greenwald reported that Rede Globo broadcast what Moro and the operation task force wanted.

When you denounce corrupt actions or deal with government issues, he always tries to distract by talking only about who revealed this corruption, who disclosed those crimes to criminalize people, journalists or sources who revealed the material. This strategy, not the journalists', is what Globo is using. Because the Globo and the Operation Car Wash task force are partners. And the documents show that, right? It's not just talking that because is about Globo. The documents show how Moro and Deltan are working together with Globo and we will report, so I know that already and the articles are showing that. But the rest of the mainstream media are treating the story with the gravity it deserves. It is impossible for everyone reading this material to defend what Moro did. Impossible! [...] I can say that exactly as I said today, Globo was to Operation Car Wash task force allied, friend, partner, partner. Just as the Operation Car Wash task force was the same for Globo.

— Glenn Greenwald

Rede Globo countered this criticism saying Greenwald had contacted them for a partnership but that it could not go ahead because Greenwald would not reveal the hacker's identity. Greenwald replied that he had had no response from Rede Globo.

[...] cause outrage and revolt against the attacks he makes against Globo in the interview published by the Agência Pública. If his evaluation of Globo's journalism and the Operation Car Wash coverage over the last five years is that exposed in this interview, why he insisted so much to repeat "a winning partnership" and to be the subject of one of the most prestigious programs of the broadcaster? Globo covered the Operation Car Wash with correctness and objectivity, reporting its developments in other instances, always opening space for the defense of the accused. Greenwald's behavior in the episodes narrated here allows the audience to judge his character.

— Rede Globo

Brazilian journalist and author Ricardo Kotscho, writing to Observatório da Imprensa, said,

This is what is happening in Brazil, with this rocambolic story of the fajute hackers of Araraquara, to hide what has already been investigated and denounced by The Intercept and other vehicles about the modus operandi of former judge Sergio Moro and his trained prosecutors. But this shielding is only possible because the country's three major TV networks have formed a safety net that hides the most important - the toxic content of Moro's dialogues with Lava Jato's attorneys - to exhaustively report the modus operandi of the tabajara hackers. Globo, Record and SBT left journalism aside to form a national network with a single news release, guided only by their commercial and political interests, as they did during the last presidential campaign. (...) Globo, as usual, is more sophisticated, more sinuous, gives an air of Olympic seriousness to the Bonners of the JN and does not lose the chance to publish editorials about its `exemption and impartiality', as if everyone were an idiot.

== Sports controversies ==
=== Pre-recorded UFC fight ===
On 27 May 2012, an Ultimate Fighting Championship match was aired by Rede Globo, billed as a "live broadcast". However, the Globosat (Grupo Globo's pay-per-view service) channel, Combate, broadcast the match 30 minutes earlier than Rede Globo.

=== Sports coverage monopoly ===
Rede Globo, with Rede Bandeirantes, holds a near monopoly on sports broadcasts in Brazil, especially the broadcasting of the Campeonato Brasileiro de Futebol. The factors that contributed to this monopoly include the instigation of cable and satellite subscription television services in Brazil and the withdrawal of other networks from this type of broadcasting.

On 20 October 2010, the Administrative Council for Economic Defense (CADE), a government antitrust agency, advised Clube dos 13 (a representative body of the 20 major league teams of Brazilian association football) to diversify the number and type of broadcasting rights it offers between 2012 and 2014. Nevertheless, Clube dos 13 signed an all encompassing contract with Rede Globo. The contract meant that games did not commence until 10 p.m. so that a live broadcast would not clash with the 9 p.m. soap operas. With a 10 p.m. kick-off, this caused decreased numbers of spectators.

== Other controversies ==
=== Tax irregularities and spending of charity funds ===
In November 2013, CartaCapital, a news magazine founded in 1994 and Groupo Globo's competitor, published a story that, in 2005, Rede Globo had negotiated debt relief with JPMorgan Chase, the multinational bank, to a value of R$158 million. CartaCapital cited the documents of the revenue service.

The revenue service, in 2006, investigated the finances of Rede Globo. Several of the resulting charges were dismissed except for one, which resulted in a fine of R$730 million in 2013. In its purchase of the broadcasting rights to the 2002 FIFA World Cup, a further fine of R$615 million was imposed due to tax avoidance. However, a few weeks later, civil service employee Cristina Maris Meinick Ribeiro lost the docket. Ribeiro was imprisoned for four years without implicating anyone else.

A document dated 15 September 2006, released by WikiLeaks in 2013, stated that Rede Globo gave UNESCO only 10% of the amount collected since 1986 through the annual Criança Esperança telethon, a charity fundraiser benefiting poor children and promoted in partnership with the United Nations. Rede Globo said "to ignore" this information and claimed that "all the money raised by the campaign is deposited directly to the UNESCO account".

=== Beyond Citizen Kane ===
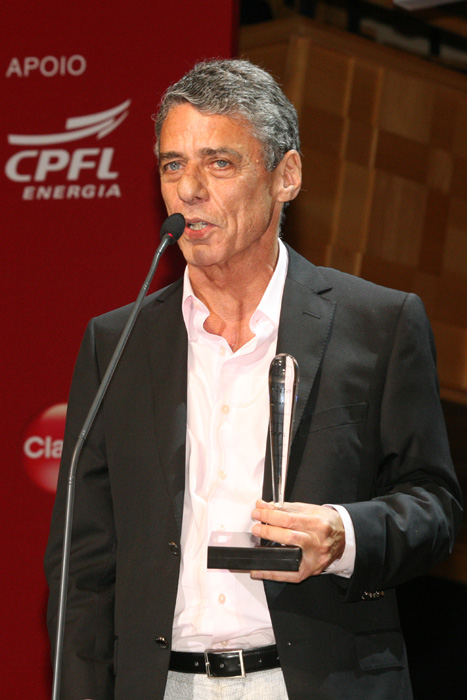
Chico Buarque was interviewed for the documentary.

Beyond Citizen Kane (Muito Aléim do Cidadãs Kane) is a 1993 documentary film produced by Simon Hartog. The title references the anti-hero Charles Foster Kane in Orson Welles' 1941 film Citizen Kane which is based on the life of the American newspaper business magnate, William Randolph Hearst. The film focusses on the history of Rede Globo from its beginnings to 1990, presenting it as a media entity which uses ruthless manipulation to maintain its dominance in the media industry in Brazil.

The documentary has four parts: Rede Globo's relationship with the military; the contract between Rede Globo and Time Life; Marinho's power and influence; and, Rede Globo's associations with government bodies.

The film was broadcast in the United Kingdom by the free-to-air Channel 4. Broadcasting of the film was prohibited in Brazil. This did not prevented private circulation and availability on the internet in Brazil. Rede Globo tried to purchase the rights to the film but was blocked by Hartog's estate. Rede Record also tried to purchase the rights to the film but arrived at difficulties due to copyright ownership of interviews from the Rede Globe archives. Nevertheless, Rede Record did complete the purchase in 2009.

=== Papa-Tudo ===
"And so, using a large television network, [...] a great saleswoman pitching directly to children nagging their parents to buy, [...] associating with beyond suspicion, one of the biggest deals hit the public who believed in Rede Globo, the public who purchased the products that the network claims are donated to "charities" blessed by Rede Globo. Poor public, moved by the deception of glamorous television tricks."

— Antônio Paiva Rodrigues, Observatório da Imprensa

In 1985, businessman and banker, Artur Falk founded Interunion Capitalização, a stockbroking company. In the early 1990s, Falk and Marinho joined to create Papa-tudo, a prize-linked savings account.

For R$3.00, one could purchase a bond from a post office, bookmaker or newsagency. In return for investing their money, they were promised return of their investment after a set period of time, a dividend and a chance in a weekly raffle of prize goods. Rede Globo broadcast promotions by celebrities such as César Filho, Fausto Silva and Xuxa Meneghel and the weekly Sunday draw.

Stock in Interunion Capitalização itself was also sold to a value of about R$200 million. When Interunion Capitalização defaulted on its stock and the Papa-tudo bonds and prizes, Superintendência de Seguros Privados (Susep or office of private securities) intervened. Falk was prosecuted and convicted of fraud. He avoided punishment due to the expiry of the statute of limitations. Rede Globo was not held culpable.

=== Purchase of TV Paulista ===
In 1952, the TV Paulista television station opened in São Paulo. It was sold by its founder, Oswaldo Ortiz Monteiro in 1955 to Victor Costa. Victor Costa became a 55% share holder in the company. Costa died before the TV Paulista company title could be transferred by the Brazil Department of Communications (Dentel). Costa's son and heir controlled TV Paulista but not its shares which remained with the Monteiro family. The transfer of Monteiro's shares to Marinho was certified by Dentel in 1977. TV Paulista was renamed TV Globo São Paulo.

After Monteiro's death in 1990, his estate questioned the legality of the original sale. A questioned documents examiner, the Del Picchia Institute in São Paulo reported there was doubt over the authenticity of the sale documents. Rede Globo replied and in 2010, the matter was settled in the Supreme Federal Court in favour of Rede Globo.

=== TV Diário removed from satellite ===
TV Diário's logo

On 25 February 2009, Sistema Verdes Mares, a large Brazilian media conglomerate, ceased broadcasting from its TV Diário network via satellite. Although based in Ceará, TV Diário had been expanding under the management of Edson Queiroz group which was associated with Grupo Globo, a competitor of Sistema Verdes Mares.

Rede Globo explained, "TV Globo, as the flagship of Rede Globo network and formed by a group of 121 affiliate stations, seeks to accommodate VHF and UHF signals so that they are confined to their respective coverage areas. This way, through mutual understanding and respect for reciprocal interests, TV Diário operations will be restricted to its coverage territory, and it will no longer be available in the territories of other affiliates. Its signal will continue on satellite covering the state of Ceará, however, it will be scrambled".

A similar change in broadcasting occurred when Amazon Sat TV, the property of the Amazon Network, ceased free satellite and imposed the need of a digital satellite receiver (set-top box) and an access card. However, from 2014, Amazon Sat TV became available nationally through the satellite SES-6 used by Oi TV, which was not part of Grupo Globo.

=== Defamation complaint ===
On 16 September 2008, comedians Casseta & Planeta performed a sketch in their comedy show Casseta & Planeta, Urgente! which was broadcast by Rede Globo. The sketch featured a fictional political candidate who had no arms or legs, called "Tinoco the Stump Man". Tinoco states, "You know me: I am Tinoco the Stump Man. Vote for me, for I cannot rob without my hands, and if I do rob, I cannot run". The Brazilian Gay, Lesbian, Bisexual, Transvestite and Transsexual Association (ABGLT) filed a complaint about the sketch with the Regional Prosecutor for Citizen Rights in São Paulo for defamation against the physically disabled.

=== Name mix-up ===
In 2011, Rede Globo was sued by bartender named Igor Pachi. His image was confused with that of a Big Brother Brazil contestant named Igor Gramani. Pachi's image appeared in promotions on the Rede Globo website and on the Multishow satellite television station programming. The court agreed Pachi could ask for retraction and was owed compensation.

=== Report on women in the Arab world ===
On 29 June 2014, Rede Globo's Fantástico program aired a story entitled "Women are seen as the property of men in Lebanon". The story was about violence against women in Arab countries, particularly in Lebanon. This was controversial in the Arab commuinity. members of the Arab community wrote letters of protest to Rede Globo.

The Federation of American-Arabs wrote, "It is imperative to address this problem, which acquires dramatic contours worldwide. But it is our duty to draw attention to the fact that, depending on how the information is conveyed, it completely distorts facts and contributes greatly to create prejudice, stereotypes, and negative social representations of an entire country, for example".

On 9 July 2014, members of São Paulo's Arab and Lebanese community gathered outside the headquarters of Rede Globo and held a protest against the report. The protesters demanded the right of reply and a retraction by Rede Globo.

=== Report on international student exchange program ===
In 2015, Rede Globo broadcast a story about the government funded Ciência sem Fronteiras international scholarship program. The story was about a medical student, Amanda Oliveira whose scholarship payment was delayed necessitating her return to Brazil from her placement abroad. Oliveira disagreed with this version of events.

=== Tiradentes ===
In November 1997, Rede Globo's competitor, Folha Group, published an article by Mariana Scalzo who reported that Rede Globo violated historical conservation standards of the Igreja Matriz de Santo Antônio church in the city of Tiradentes. Rede Globo was filming Hilda Furacão, a mini-series. Elvio Garcia, the mayor of Tiradentes had authorized the filming.

=== Upfront 2026 ===
During the Upfront 2026 event, which brings together the advertising market to present the attractions for the coming year, held on October 13, 2025, the broadcaster was accused of ridiculing and attacking its main competitors with mocking comments, targeting Band and HBO Max. In the case of the former, journalist William Bonner had made a kind of joke regarding the Formula 1 broadcasts between 2021 and 2025 on the São Paulo-based channel. On another occasion, chef Renata Vanzetto went so far as to compare the ratings of "Chef de Alto Nível" with those of "MasterChef Brasil", claiming that the former achieved higher ratings and greater public impact than the latter. Regarding the second point, comedian Fábio Porchat and presenter Sabrina Sato compared the number of views of "Beleza Fatal" with those of "Vale Tudo (2025)", in addition to calling the character Lola, from the aforementioned soap opera, "Bebel from Shopee," a clear reference to some products of dubious origin on the e-commerce site and also to the character played by Camila Pitanga in the 2007 soap opera "Paraíso Tropical," even though Pitanga also played the main villain in the Warner Bros. Discovery soap opera.

Following the controversy, several websites and some journalists highlighted that Globo had "shrunken" in relation to its competitors and that the comments had a negative impact behind the scenes at Band. During the program "Os Donos da Bola" on the 14th, the presenter and former footballer Neto, who is known for directly attacking the Rio de Janeiro-based broadcaster on his Band programs, commented on the event in a long, ten-minute rant, making serious accusations against Globo, journalist William Bonner, calling him an "idiot," "jerk," and "scumbag" live on air, and even commentator Denílson, while defending the Morumbi channel. Before that, "Bora Brasil" host Felipeh Campos mocked Globo's comments on the morning news program, as did Érick Jacquin on his social media. Sports broadcaster Téo José accused Globo of unethical behavior. The São Paulo-based broadcaster posted a photo across its social media channels mocking the taunts coming from Globo. HBO Max also responded to Globo's criticism with a meme featuring "Beleza Fatal*.

Due to the strong repercussions of the case, Globo issued an official statement emphasizing that the Upfront is an event for presenting new products and that it had not disparaged its competitors with its comments on the show.

However, the controversies surrounding the event had a negative impact internally behind the scenes at the network, with claims that it could have sent a terrible message to the advertising market. Globo CEO Paulo Marinho telephoned Band CEO Cláudio Giordans to apologize on behalf of the network, given the good relationship between the Marinho and Saad families. To prevent a recurrence of such controversy, the channel issued a rule for the 2027 Upfront prohibiting any jokes or veiled digs at competitors.

=== Use of artificial intelligence ===
TV Globo faced criticism from the public after incorporating artificial intelligence (AI) into its content. One such instance occurred during tributes to actresses Laura Cardoso and Glória Menezes, who passed away on August 17 and 18, 2026, respectively. During the opening of the show *Mais Você* on August 19, host Ana Maria Braga dedicated the entire episode to the two actresses. At one point, the network aired a tribute featuring an AI-generated image of the actresses embracing in the afterlife, accompanied by a statement from the host—a segment that was poorly received by viewers. One viewer even compared Menezes’s computer-generated face to the comedian Fafy Siqueira.

In early September, the broadcaster aired a promo announcing its lineup of films and new content for the month. The spot highlighted the Avengers and other iconic cinematic figures, featuring the network’s own talent transforming into these characters—with Luciano Huck becoming the Hulk (a play on his surname), Marcos Mion turning into Tom Cruise, and Nathalia Dill being captured by the Ghostbusters. At one point, the Avengers are shown storming the Globo Studios. The content, however, was poorly received by the public; following a strong negative reaction, the promotional teaser—along with related social media posts—was pulled from commercial breaks and replaced with a version that omitted these scenes. Furthermore, Globo received an extrajudicial notice from one of the Hollywood studios regarding the unauthorized use of their imagery for AI-generated recreations.

== See also ==
- Rede Globo history
- Partido da Imprensa Golpista
- Censorship in Brazil
- Beyond Citizen Kane
- Concentration of media ownership
- Operation Mockingbird
- Caio Blinder
- Guga Chacra
- Communism in Brazil
- Pé de Chinesa

== Bibliography ==
- Valério Cruz Brito, César Ricardo Bolano (2005). Rede Globo: Quarenta anos de poder e hegemonia. Aulus. p. 373. ISBN 9788534923378.
- Genésio Lopes, Genésio Lopes (2005). O Super Poder: O Raio X da Rede Globo: um Império da Ganância e da Lucratividade. Ibrasa. ISBN 9788534801928.
- Daniel Herz, Daniel Herz (1983). A História Secreta da Rede Globo. Porto Alegre: Tchê. p. 424. ISBN 9788599988206.
- JÁCOME, Phellipy. A constituição moderna do jornalismo no Brasil. Curitiba: Appris, 2020. 302 p. (Coleção ciências da comunicação). ISBN 9788547342814 .
