= Censorship in Brazil =

Censorship in Brazil, both cultural and political, occurred throughout the whole period following the colonization of the country. Even though most state censorship ended before the period of redemocratization that started in 1985, Brazil still experiences a certain amount of non-official censorship today. The current legislation restricts freedom of expression concerning racism (Paim Law) and the Constitution prohibits the anonymity of journalists.

== History ==
=== Military government (1964–1985) ===
In 1976, the federal government banned the performance on TV of the play Romeo and Juliet, performed by the Bolshoi Ballet and produced by BBC, under the allegation that the Bolshoi, being a Russian ballet company, and Russia being part of the Soviet Union, could show a communist view of the play. The ban has sparked severe criticism from congressmen. Even after the redemocratization in 1985, the 1976 version of the play was never shown on TV or released on home video in Brazil.

In 1985, during Brazil's military regime, the federal government banned Jean-Luc Godard's 1985 film Hail Mary, claiming that it was an insult to the Christian faith (although the State was officially secular). Singer Roberto Carlos, a devout Catholic, deliberately damaged his image with liberal sectors of Brazilian society when he supported the ban by the José Sarney administration. With the new Brazilian Constitution and redemocratization of the country, in the 1990s, the film was made available again.

=== Redemocratization ===
==== 1989 ====
In 1989, the "Anti-racism law" was passed, the law bans promotion of “Nazi ideals” and the use of “Nazi symbols”, and also bans “incitement” to discrimination or prejudice based on race, ethnicity, religion, and national origin.

==== 1990s ====
In 1994, just a day before the premiere of the British documentary Beyond Citizen Kane at the Rio de Janeiro Modern Art Museum, the Military Police confiscated the copy of the film, obeying a court warrant. The film takes a critical approach towards the establishment of Rede Globo, the largest television broadcaster in the country, explaining its ties to the military dictatorship. However, bootleg copies of the documentary became available on video-sharing websites such as YouTube and Google Video. On 20 August 2009, the newspaper Folha de S.Paulo reported that RecordTV bought the broadcasting rights to the documentary. This happened after a series of mutual attacks between Globo and RecordTV because of an investigation conducted by the Public Ministry against members of Universal Church of the Kingdom of God, founded by Edir Macedo, who is also owner of RecordTV.

The song "Luís Inácio (300 Picaretas)" by rock band Os Paralamas do Sucesso, from their 1995 album Vamo Batê Lata, was banned in the Federal District. The song alludes to a statement made by the current Brazilian President Luiz Inácio Lula da Silva in which he said that the Chamber of Deputies is formed by 300 bastards and a minority of honest men. Deputy Bonifácio Andrada of the Brazilian Labour Party of Minas Gerais, outraged with the song, managed to ban it from a concert the band would perform in Brasília on 23 June 1995 on the basis the song was offensive to an electoral candidate. Other deputies joined Andrada in his crusade against the song, but it was ultimately banned only from radio airplay.

In 1997, a law forbidden "to use trickery, montage, or other audio or video feature that, in any way, degrade or ridicule a candidate, party or coalition, or to produce or display program with that purpose" three months before a political election was created. In 2010, this law was questioned by Brazilian Association of Radio and TV and humorists and Supreme Federal Court (STF) suspended its effect.

==== 2000s ====
In 2003, when Senator Eduardo Azeredo of the Brazilian Social Democratic Party of Minas Gerais proposed a bill to curb digital crimes (known as "the digital AI-5"), he was heavily criticized by Internet users, who felt that it would force Internet service providers to act as watchdogs, since they would have the legal obligation to denounce possible illegal activities.

In 2005, the rock band Bidê ou Balde faced legal problems after the release of their song "E Por Que Não?" (And Why Not?) on the MTV Brasil special album Acústico MTV Bandas Gaúchas (MTV Acoustic Gaúcha Bands). The song was seen by some as encouraging incest and pedophilia. After several lawsuits from women's and children's right organizations, MTV felt pressured to re-release the album without the track and to stop showing its music video. The lyrics of the song, however, can still be found on the Internet.

In February 2007, two court cases were settled when an agreement was reached that all copies of the book Roberto Carlos em Detalhes, an unauthorized biography of singer Roberto Carlos by journalist Paulo César de Araújo, would be repurchased from bookstores. The singer's attempt to censor the book proved to be a failure, since copies can be easily found on the Internet.

On 18 January 2008, a court order prohibited the sale of the games Counter-Strike and EverQuest in Brazil, arguing that they were extremely violent. The move has been described by media as a publicity stunt on the regulation of video game violence and sexually explicit content, and also as a hasty decision that ignored much more violent games. As all versions of Counter-Strike were very popular in Brazil at the time, the decision was met with considerable uproar by the Brazilian gaming community. The game's developer Valve did not comment on the episode. However, on 18 June 2009, a regional federal court order lifting the ban of Counter-Strike was published.

On 22 September 2008, Minas Gerais PSDB attempted to censor a documentary about censorship: "Gagged in Brazil", by Daniel Florencio. The short film elucidates the imbrication between politics and media in the state of Minas Gerais, where the media only conveyed news favorable to the state government, censoring journalists that were critical of governor Aécio Neves.

On 30 July 2009, Fernando Sarney, son of former President and Senator José Sarney, obtained a favorable decision from the Federal District Court of Justice that kept the newspaper O Estado de S. Paulo from publishing stories about a criminal investigation conducted by the Federal Police against him., as Brazilian law prohibits disclosure of the status of criminal investigations before they are concluded. Later that year, the STF rejected a suit by the newspaper seeking to overturn the ruling, thus maintaining the information unavailable. The NGO Reporters Without Borders called the Supreme Court decision "incomprehensible" and "dangerous." After the investigation was finished, and Fernando Sarney was charged for his crimes, the censored information was released to the public.

==== 2010s ====
In April 2010, Google reported that Brazil was the country with most requests from its government to take down content. In June 2010, Brazilian Election Justice through Superior Electoral Court requested Google to remove two blogs: "amigosdopresidentelula.blogspot.com" and "euqueroserra.blogspot.com", which were deemed as political propaganda for Dilma Rousseff and José Serra respectively.

On 9 August 2011, the Federal Justice of Minas Gerais blocked the distribution of A Serbian Film, a 2010 Serbian horror film, in Brazil. This was the first time a movie was banned in Brazil since the promulgation of the 1988 Constitution. As of 2012 this decision has been overturned and the film given a "not recommended for those under the age of 18, due to depictions of sex, pedophilia, violence and cruelty" rating.

In September 2012, an elections court in Brazil ordered the arrest of Fábio José Silva Coelho, Google's most senior executive in the country, after the company failed to take down YouTube videos attacking a local mayoral candidate. The stringent 1965 Electoral Code bans campaign ads that “offend the dignity or decorum” of a candidate. Google is appealing the order, which comes after a similar decision by another Brazilian elections judge. In that case, the judge found a different senior executive responsible for violating local election law after the company refused to take down a YouTube video mocking a mayoral candidate. That decision was overturned by another judge who wrote that “Google is not the intellectual author of the video, it did not post the file, and for that reason it cannot be punished for its propagation.” Google also defended users’ political rights saying "that voters have a right to use the Internet to freely express their opinions about candidates for political office, as a form of full exercise of democracy, especially during electoral campaigns”.

In 2016, Federal Deputy for São Paulo Eduardo Bolsonaro, son of Deputy Jair Bolsonaro, introduced a bill to amend the "Anti-racism law" to also ban promotion of Communist ideals and the use of Communist symbols, and to also ban fomentation of conflict between social classes.

==== 2020s ====
In November 2021, then 84 years old Brazilian movie director Reynaldo Paes de Barros, most known for directing photography for a movie adaptation of the novel Menino de engenho, was convicted of racism for the screening of his short film Matem... Os Outros!, following protests from Indigenous people's rights activists. The film portrays a group of Brazilian southerners travelling together while speaking racist rhetoric against the indigenous peoples of Brazil. Paes de Barros was fined and sentenced to two years in prison, converted into community service. The MPF (Public Prosecutor's Office) has objected to the decision, arguing the filmmaker's penalty should be much higher.

In recent years, the Brazilian Supreme Court and Supreme Electoral Court have often been accused of engaging in censorship and abridging the right of freedom of expression, according to New York Times columnist Jack Nicas, examples of controversial decisions of the courts includes: ordering arrests without trial for threats posted on social networks; sentencing a federal deputy to almost nine years in prison for threatening the Court; ordering search and seizure against businessmen with little evidence of irregularities and blocking dozens of accounts and thousands of posts on social media, with virtually no transparency or room for appeal.

In February 2022, the Superior Electoral Court announced that 3 telegram channels, which are allegedly involved in fake news dissemination, had been regionally blocked by their request, under penalty of the Telegram being suspended for 48 hours. This decision includes one of the channels of the right-wing journalist Allan dos Santos, who had already had his website (Terça Livre) and YouTube channel deleted by a Supreme Federal Court decision. On March 18, the Superior Electoral Court ordered the suspension of all access to the service, alleging that the platform had repeatedly ignored the court's decisions. Following the Superior Electoral Court's decision, Telegram's founder and CEO Pavel Durov claimed that the court was sending emails to an "old general-purpose email address" that Telegram hadn't been checking, and sought a reinvestigation of the decision. The ban was lifted two days later.

In November 2022, a Brazilian Supreme Court ruling was criticized as censorship by representatives of tech-giants Twitter, Instagram, Facebook, Telegram, YouTube and TikTok after the court blocked the social media accounts of the minor far-left political party Workers' Cause Party. The President of the Supreme Court defended the decision alleging that the party was expressing “criminal statements”, with “mass dissemination of open and repeated attacks on democratic institutions and on the Democratic Rule of Law itself, in total disregard of the constitutional parameters that protect freedom of expression”.

In May 2023, the Brazilian Supreme Court minister Alexandre de Moraes, ordered the exclusion of all ads from companies opposing the Fake News Bill, such as Google, Meta, Spotify, and Brasil Paralelo. Alleging that the ads would be attacks to the bill under discussion in the Chamber of Deputies, he fixed a fine of R$150,000 per hour, and ordered the presidents of these companies to testify to the Federal Police. The Fake News bill has been criticized for increasing the power of state censorship and control over the dissemination of information by those companies.

Also in May 2023, the Public Prosecutor's Offices of Brazil and São Paulo launched investigations into an app called "Simulador de Escravidão" ("Slavery Simulator"), available on the Google Play Store. The game allowed users to play as slave owners and choose between maximizing profit while suppressing rebellions or fighting for freedom and abolition. The ministry has demanded access to relevant documents and internal approval procedures. Google has since removed the game from its app store and emphasized its commitment to preventing hate and violence by enforcing strict policies against apps that incite racial hatred. While the app's icon depicted a white man and his black slave in the Modern Era, some screenshots depicted scenes of what resembles slavery in antiquity of various ethnicities. In the app's page, some comments expressed wishes of additional means of punishing and torturing slaves, while the game's developer claimed the game was made purely for entertainment purposes and that they condemn slavery in the real world.

In 2024, the Brazilian Supreme Court ordered the suspension of the social media platform X (formerly Twitter) after its owner, Elon Musk, refused to appoint a legal representative in the country. In Brazilian law it is understood that freedom of expression cannot overlap with other rights. The Constitution itself provides that the freedom of one individual cannot harm that of another. Section X of article 5, for example, determines the protection of intimacy, privacy, honor and image of people.

In 2024, messages between Supreme Court Justice Alexandre de Moraes and his assistants were leaked. Among the leaked messages are references to illicit use of electoral justice

== Freedom of speech and the press ==
Brazilian law enforces freedom of speech and press, and the authorities generally respect these rights in practice. The independent media are active and express a wide variety of views with no restriction, but nongovernmental criminal elements continue to subject journalists to violence because of their professional activities. A growing number of cases of judicial censorship of the media pose a serious threat to press freedom. Brazilian law states that "material deemed offensive to a certain party may be removed if said party enters judicial action". However, this is sometimes exploited by companies and government officials, whom the law sometimes favors.

The National Association of Newspapers (ANJ) reports cases of imprisonment, aggression, censorship, and failure to respect freedom of the press. Between 1 January and 26 July 2011, the ANJ reported 23 cases of censorship, threats, direct violence against journalists, and other forms of pressure against news organizations and professionals, including three killings, one imprisonment, six cases of censorship, and nine instances of verbal assault and physical battery, though those were reportedly not practised by the Brazilian government, but by criminal organizations.

In 2010, there were already complaints about the growth of press censorship in Brazil, via the Judiciary "The Brazilian electoral legislation is favoring censorship into the journalism practice", was the assessment of those who participated in the panel "Freedom of Speech and democratic state" during a forum in the São Paulo city Journalist and columnist Reinaldo Azevedo of Veja magazine; television comedian Marcelo Madureira from sketch show Casseta & Planeta; and professor of ethics and political philosophy Roberto Romano participated in the debate. Azevedo said that the legislation affect mainly the internet and television. "Television, especially, is obliged to give the same space to people who has something to tell, and who hasn't nothing to say." Romano wrote that court decisions also undermine freedom of expression. "There is a movement not only in Brazil, but internationally, to control the power of the state, through the Judiciary". Romano cited a case of censorship to the newspaper "O Estado de S. Paulo" as an example. According to Madureira, comedians are extremely hurt with the Brazilian electoral legislation.

In 2019, Supreme Court Minister Alexandre de Moraes imposed censorship to magazine Crusoé and O Antagonista for any reports in which Marcelo Odebrecht referred to Dias Toffoli, then President of the Brazilian Supreme Court, claiming the publication was fake news. Newspaper Folha de São Paulo had access to the original document from Lava Jato and determined it was not fake news.

== Internet freedom ==
There are no government restrictions on access to the Internet or credible reports that the government monitors e-mail or Internet chat rooms. Individuals and groups can engage in the expression of views via the Internet, including by e‑mail. A continuing trend is for private individuals and official bodies to take legal action against Internet service providers and providers of online social media platforms, such as Google, Facebook, and Orkut, holding them accountable for content posted to or provided by users of the platform. Judicial rulings often result in the forced removal of content from the Internet.

Brazil is not individually classified by the OpenNet Initiative (ONI), but is included in the ONI regional overview for Latin America.

Brazilian legislation restricts the freedom of expression (Paim Law), directed especially to publications considered racist (such as neo-nazi sites). The Brazilian Constitution also prohibits anonymity of journalists.

In March 2009, Chamber President Michel Temer ordered TV Câmara to remove a video of a debate from its website in which CartaCapital journalist Leandro Fortes criticized Gilmar Mendes' tenure as Court President. Many viewed this as political censorship and the video was soon posted on YouTube. After being denounced for censorship by the country's main bodies representing journalists, TV Câmara has uploaded the debate back to its website.

In September 2012, an elections court in Brazil ordered the arrest of Google's most senior executive in the country, after the company failed to take down YouTube videos attacking a local mayoral candidate. The stringent 1965 Electoral Code bans campaign ads that “offend the dignity or decorum” of a candidate, although critic is, notably, permitted. Google is appealing the order, which might be decided after a similar decision by another Brazilian elections judge. In that case, the judge found a different senior executive responsible for violating local election law after the company refused to take down a YouTube video mocking a mayoral candidate. That decision was overturned by another judge who wrote that “Google is not the intellectual author of the video, it did not post the file, and for that reason it cannot be punished for its propagation.”

In November 2022, Brazil's Supreme Elections Court ordered the suspension of the Twitter accounts of two far-right congressmen, Nikolas Ferreira and Marcos Cintra, for demanding explanations from the court for supposed voting fraud in that year's elections.

In August 2024, the Brazilian Supreme Court ordered the suspension of the social media platform Twitter after its owner, Elon Musk, refused to appoint a legal representative in the country. The platform had been without a legal representative since mid-August after the previous representative evacuated the country due to the threat of imprisonment. Justice Alexandre de Moraes imposed a fine of R$50,000 (US$9,000) per day for anyone who accesses Twitter using a virtual private network (VPN). De Moraes' initial ruling also required Apple and Google to remove all VPNs from their app stores, but he suspended this aspect of the ruling following public backlash.

In June 2025, the Supreme Court issued a preliminary ruling that social media platforms are liable for the actions of their users in certain cases (such as hate speech), and may be required to expedite the removal of content even without a court order.

== Self-censorship ==
=== Rede Globo ===
Rede Globo, the largest telenovela producer of the country, is known to have practiced self-censorship on at least two occasions.

According to Afro-Brazilian actor Tony Tornado, in a statement for the 2000 documentary A Negação do Brasil which denounces racism on the Brazilian television, three final sequences were shot for the 1985 telenovela Roque Santeiro, which drew a record-breaking audience. In two of them, the protagonist Porcina (Regina Duarte) ended up with white characters (Lima Duarte or José Wilker) and in the other, she ended up with Tornado's character Rodésio. Globo's press office, however, reported that just two final sequences had been shot; with Porcina ending up with one of the white characters. According to Tornado, the third sequence was banned by the head of the network.

=== Rede Record ===
Rede Record was criticized for censoring the 2009 telenovela Poder Paralelo. The head of the network vetoed author Lauro César Muniz, who claimed to have left Globo due to the lack of artistic freedom, and director Ignácio Coqueiro from writing and directing scenes featuring thighs, breasts, buttocks and coarse language. Although the head of the network claimed the scenes were being cut so that the program could receive a 14 classification, scenes containing deep violence were not removed. This resulted in bad reviews for the network, already known for its aestheticization of violence.

== See also ==
- Brazilian advisory rating system – a Brazilian rating organization for media
- National Truth Commission
- Criticism of Rede Globo
- List of films banned in Brazil
