= Brazil: Cinema, Sex and the Generals =

1985 British documentary film

- Directed by: Simon Hartog
- Release date: 1985
- Country: United Kingdom
- Language: English

Brazil: Cinema, Sex and the Generals is a 1985 British documentary film directed by Simon Hartog that examines Brazilian filmmakers who used the pornochanchada (or sex comedy) genre to escape censorship of their socially critical films during the military dictatorship in Brazil.

The documentary was initially scheduled for broadcast on Channel 4 on 19 June 1985 in its Visions strand, to coincide with a season of Brazilian films being shown at the National Film Theatre, but was not aired due to a ban by the Independent Broadcasting Authority. A "revised version" was prepared and scheduled for 18 September 1985, but it too was banned by the IBA because it included a caption explaining which scenes had been cut. Visions producer John Ellis appeared on Right to Reply two days later to explain the ban. The film was eventually screened on 6 April 1991 in the Banned season of programmes relating to censorship, as an edition of Channel 4's Signals strand.

== See also ==
- 1985 in film
- Beyond Citizen Kane, another documentary by Simon Hartog
