= Daniel Mornin =

Daniel Mornin (1956–2014) was an Irish playwright, screenwriter and novelist writing about contemporary Ulster.

== Early life ==
Born and raised in Belfast, where his father Daniel was a machinist and his mother a cleaner, Mornin left school at 15, taking a variety of jobs before joining the Royal Navy. After leaving the navy in 1977 he travelled extensively through France, Austria, Turkey, Nepal and North Africa. He moved to London in 1969. Daniel Mornin would only have been 13 in 1969 and he definitely didn't move to London, as he was still living in Belfast with his family.He moved to Derby in 1975 and lived with his Aunt Daisy Jenkins and family, working at International Combustion for a short while until joining the Navy. After taking English and economics A-levels he turned down a teachers' training course instead opting for a theatre workshop.

== Career ==
Mornin's first play, Mum and Son, produced at the Riverside Studios, West London, in 1981 (and subsequently at the Lyric Theatre, Belfast, in 1984) opened a rich seam of original drama in the 1980s that included Resting Time (Tring), Kate (the Bush, West London), Short of Mutiny (Theatre Royal Stratford East), and the radio play Scuttling Off (BBC Radio 3). Comrade Ogilvy was staged by the Royal Shakespeare Company at the Barbican in 1984.

The Murderers (1985), set in East Belfast at the beginning of the 1970s, directed by Peter Gill at the National Theatre was called by Irving Wardle "the work of an able and impassioned writer" and for which he won the George Devine award for most promising playwright. This was followed in 1987 by Built on Sand at the Royal Court directed by Lindsay Posner and by Weights and Measures, a black comedy based on the Dennis Nilsen murders, was enthusiastically received by an invited audience at the National Theatre studios in 1987 but considered too dark for a full-scale production.

His novel, All Our Fault (Hutchinson, London, 1991), "a strong, tragic story of torture and death", was set against the backdrop of the Troubles in 1969. In the same year Channel 4 showed Mornin's In the Border Country directed by Thaddeus O'Sullivan and starring Sean Bean, Brendan Gleeson and Juliet Stevenson and for which he was awarded a Banff Award. His second play for the National, At Our Table (1991), was a compelling study of the banality of evil, inspired by Primo Levi and with haunting music by Mornin's close friend Stephen Warbeck.

All Our Fault was later adapted for the film Nothing Personal directed by Thaddeus O'Sullivan and for which Mornin was screenwriter and starred Ian Hart, John Lynch and Michael Gambon. Hart won best supporting actor at the 52nd Venice International Film Festival for his part.

Mornin also worked as an IT consultant to support himself and his family.

== Personal life ==
Mornin was married to Aine whom he met at the first night of his first play Mum and Son and with whom he had two children.
