= O Globo =

Brazilian daily newspaper

- Type: Daily newspaper
- Format: Broadsheet
- Owner: Grupo Globo
- Founder: Irineu Marinho
- Publisher: Editora Globo
- Editor: Ruth de Aquino
- Opinion editor: Aluízio Maranhão
- Photo editor: José Roberto Serra
- Founded: 29 July 1925; 101 years ago
- Political alignment: Conservatism; Economic liberalism
- Language: Portuguese
- Headquarters: Rua Irineu Marinho, 35, Rio de Janeiro, RJ 20230-023
- Country: Brazil
- Circulation: 373,138 (2021)
- Website: oglobo.globo.com

O Globo (Portuguese pronunciation: [uˈɡlobu], The Globe) is a Portuguese-language Brazilian newspaper based in Rio de Janeiro. O Globo is the leading daily newspaper in the country and the most prominent print publication in the Grupo Globo media conglomerate.

== History ==
Founded by journalist Irineu Marinho, owner of A Noite, it was originally intended as a morning daily to extend the newspaper interests of the company. In time, it became the flagship paper of the group. When Irineu died weeks after the founding of the newspaper in 1925, it was inherited by his son Roberto. At age 21, he started working as a trainee reporter for the paper and later became managing editor.

Roberto Marinho developed Grupo Globo (the conglomerate of media companies consisting of O Globo, TV Globo, Rádio Globo, Editora Globo and other subsidiaries) as Brazil's largest media group, entering radio in the 1940s and TV in the 1960s, and picking up other interests.

An active supporter of the military dictatorship that lasted from 1964 to 1985 in Brazil, O Globo is still considered a right-wing, conservative newspaper, although it has acknowledged in a 2013 editorial that its "support for the military coup was an error".

As of 2022, O Globo was the leading newspaper in the country, with more than 60,000 copies distributed on a daily basis. In the same year, O Globo was also leading the audience ranking for print media-owned websites, achieving a peak of more than 40 million unique visitors in October.

In April 2026, O Globo was recognized by Guinness World Records for publishing the largest newspaper edition of all time. The July 29, 2025 edition was a special publication celebrating O Globo's centenary and contained 526 pages.

== Awards ==
- 1986, Princess of Asturias Award in Communication.

== Political alignment ==
It has been characterized by supporting the military during the process of political opening in Brazil during the 1980s. It has also been involved in other conflicts for misrepresenting information about popular demonstrations.

An active supporter of the military dictatorship that lasted from 1964 to 1985, O Globo is still considered a right-wing and conservative newspaper.

It follows a strongly liberal line in economic terms, having been a stubborn oppositionist to the progressive governments of Luiz Inácio Lula da Silva and Dilma Rousseff.

== Censorship ==
In 1994, just a day before the premiere in Brazil of the British documentary Beyond Citizen Kane, at the Rio de Janeiro Modern Art Museum, the Military Police confiscated the copy of the film, obeying a court warrant in response to a suit filed by Globo. The film explored the establishment of TV Globo, the largest television broadcaster in the country, and its ties to the military dictatorship of the period. The director of the museum was threatened with a heavy fine in case of disobedience. Due to the public outcry about the censorship, the Secretary of Culture of Rio de Janeiro was fired three days after the incident.

In 1995, Globo requested in court the confiscation of copies available at the library of the University of São Paulo, but the claim was overruled. The film was restricted to University groups until the 2000s. Globo's attempt to prevent release of the film in Brazil proved to be a failure following the Internet boom in the 2000s. Through the 1990s, the film was illegally screened in universities and political groups without public notice, and later it went "viral" on the Internet.

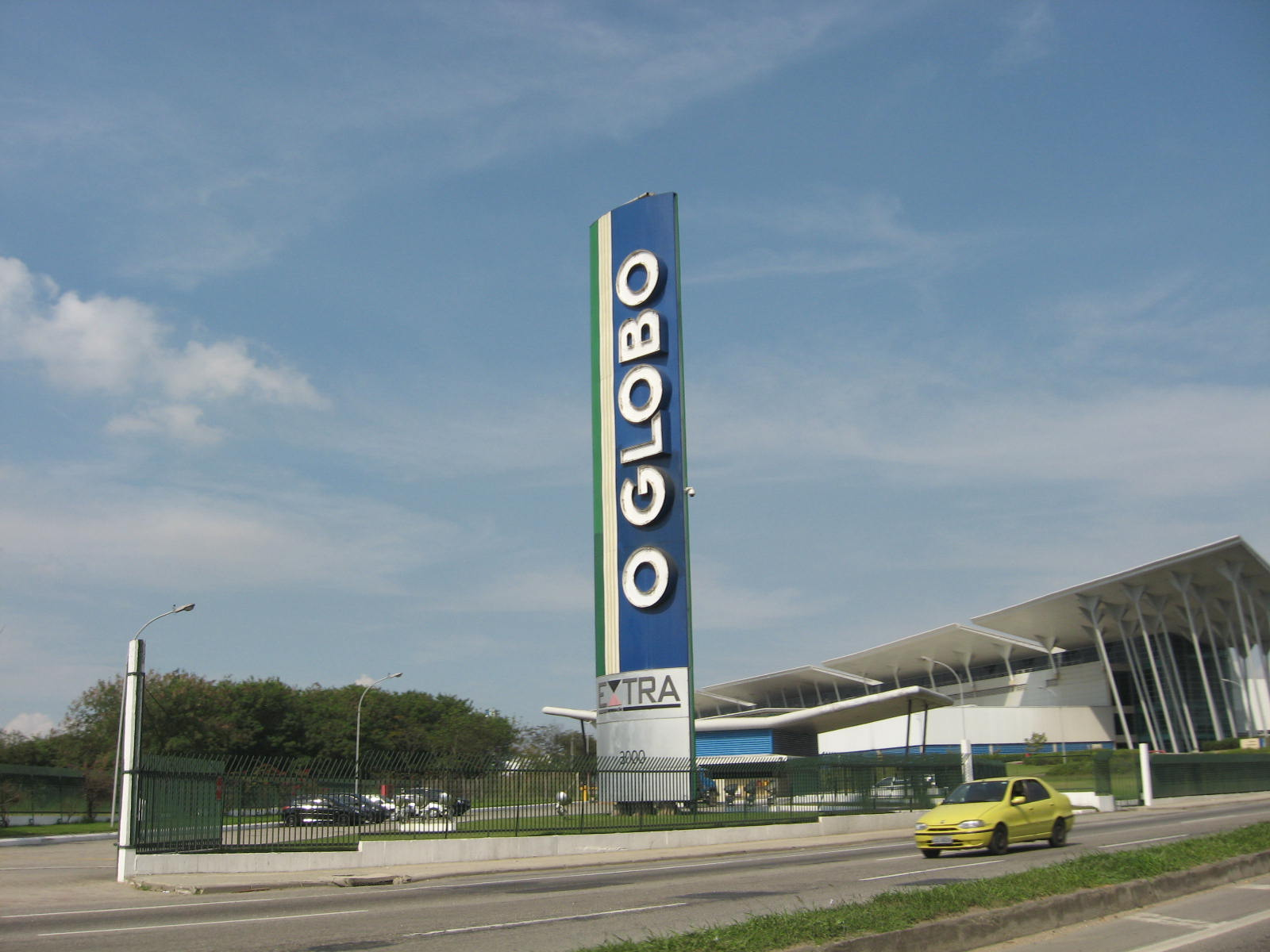
Printing plant located in Duque de Caxias

On 20 August 2009, the newspaper Folha de S. Paulo reported that Rede Record bought the broadcasting rights of the documentary for less than US$20,000. This followed a series of mutual attacks between Globo and Record because of Globo's reporting of a Public Ministry investigation of Edir Macedo and other high-profile members of the Universal Church of the Kingdom of God. Macedo has owned Rede Record since 9 November 1989.

== Recent circulation history ==
Year	2014	2015	2016	2017	2018	2019	2020	2021
Total circulation	321,919	304,053	307,339	243,404	315,004	333,773	341,738	373,138
