= Vera Neubauer =

Czech film director, editor and animator

- Born: Prague, Czech Republic
- Education: State Academy of Fine Arts Stuttgart (BA); Royal College of Art (MA)
- Occupations: Animator; Artist; Educator
- Spouse: Phil Mulloy

Vera Neubauer is a Czech born British experimental filmmaker, animator, feminist activist and educator. She is known for her jarring, provocative and anti establishment approach. Her life's work spans genres, from cinematic short film to television series for children. Neubauer has received two BAFTA Cymru awards. In 2023 Neubauer was made an Honorary Doctor of The Royal College of Art.

== Early life ==
Vera Neubauer was born to Dr. Helene and Dr. Karl Neubauer in Prague. In December 1965, three years before the Soviet invasion of Czechoslovakia, Neubauer fled the totalitarian regime with her parents and siblings. Arriving in Vienna, Neubauer gained refugee status and traveled on to Düsseldorf. Here she studied Print-making at the State Academy of Fine Arts Stuttgart under professor Gunter Bohmer.

In 1968 Neubauer moved to London where she continued to study printmaking at the Royal College of Art and in 1970 switched to the RCA film school. She struggled to survive and squatted in central Brixton. During this period she worked in a local Brixton Youth Centre and taught print-making at Isleworth Polytechnic.

== Career ==
Neubauer's experiences of life as a refugee and the loss of her family, often inform her works. As do her personal takes on the themes of birth, death, abuse, femininity, myth and existence.

In the UK Neubauer became one of founding members of the film collective 'Spectre' that included Stephen Dwoskin, Phil Mulloy, Simon Hartog, Anna Ambrose, Michael Whyte, John Ellis, Keith Griffiths, and Thaddeus O'Sullivan.

Neubauer's collected works are distributed by the BFI, LUX and New York based The Film-Makers' Cooperative.

Neubauer is known for her work in multiple moving image disciplines and for her nuanced feminist stance. She has won multiple awards for her work including two BAFTA Cymru Awards.

=== Animation ===
She is a key figure in the History of British animation and is linked to the Second Wave of British Animation (1979–1996). Neubauer has been active as a filmmaker, animator and instigator of social reform for five decades.

Vera Neubauer's films are the terrorist branch of the art form, the Red Brigade of the animated film. (Animating the Unconscious: Desire, Sexuality and Animation by Leslie Felperin)

Her first animated series after graduation was 'Pip and Bessie' that was commissioned for three years by the Germany television station Bayerischer Rundfunk.

Neubauer's oeuvre of animated works is often considered experimental and ‘cutting edge’.

Vera Neubauer is one of Britain’s most innovative and provocative animators. Her highly idiosyncratic style uses an array of techniques, combining animated sequences with documentary and live action drama, provoking and entertaining in equal measure. (British Animation Awards)

She is frequently cited for her ability to combine her personal stories of pain, loss and rebirth, underpinned by a wider societal commentary. Her canon of work mixes various techniques such as 2D drawing with photography, scratching into film emulation, cut out collage and giving character to found objects.

=== Live action ===
Neubauer's works often center around, and are created within her own neighborhood. Many of her films are short and meditative. Neubauer often uses the camera, much as a painter would use a brush, to create broad poetic strokes.

Neubauer's first drama film “Don’t be Afraid” made in 1990 starred a young Nick Moran in the lead. It was based on the life of a squatting white couple who gave birth to a mixed race baby. The film gave an insight into issues facing young urban youth, both political and personal, whilst confronting audience's expectations and prejudices.

Her narrative and experimental films make use of guerrilla production techniques and are often socially critical and focus on social issues, poverty, women's rights, abuse and the homelessness.

=== Education ===
Neubauer taught for nearly 30 years at Royal College of Art, Central Saint Martins and Goldsmiths College.

== In literature / film ==
Neubauer is the subject of Maria Anna Tappeiner's 2012 45 minute documentary for 3sat 'Das Ganze Leben im Trickfilm' ('An Entire Life in Animation').

== Retrospectives ==
- The International Festival of Animation Bristol 1987
- Unity Theatre, Liverpool 1987
- Fantoche Film Festival Switzerland 1997
- Animania Mostra Internationale Del Nuovo Cinema, Rome 1998
- Metro Cinema (Derby) 2000
- Lleida International Animation Film Festival (now known as Animac) 2002
- Mecal International Short Film Festival Barcelona 2002
- Tampere Film Festival 2003
- Anima Mundi (event) 2003
- Mumbai International Film Festival 2004
- Interfilm Berlin 2005
- Volda University College Norway 2006
- International Animated Film Festival Sienna 2009
- Mediawave, Hungary 2010
- China Academy of Art – Hangzhou, China 2012
- Anifilm – Třeboň 2015
- Epos Art Film Festival Tel Aviv 2018
- Fantoche Baden 2018
- Cinanima Espino Portugal 2018
- Animator in Poznań, Poland 2018

== Filmography ==
Year	Film	Role	Notes
2019	Fields of Vision	Director, Animator	4 min.
2019	The Mummy's Curse Returns	Director, Animator	18 min.
2016	A Tragedy of No Importance	Director	7 min.
2015	You Are	Director	15 min.
2014	Scarred Skies	Director	4 min.
2014	Life Story	Director	3 min.
2013	One Day In May	Director	20 min. live musical performance, in collaboration with composer and violinist Alexander Bălănescu
2010	All Done and Dusted	Director, writer, animator	3 min.
2010	Fly In The Sky	Director, writer, animator	20 min.
2004	Woolly Town - Woolly Head	Director, writer, animator	5 min.
2002	Hooked	Director, writer, animator	10 min. Channel Four & Arts Council of England
2002	Woolly Wolf	Director, writer, animator	4.15 min. Sianel Pedwar Cymru Winner BAFTA Cymru Best Animation & Winner BAFTA Cymru Best Short Film
1999	La Luna	Director, writer, animator	26 min. Channel Four & British Film Institute
1999	I Dance	Director, animator	2 min.
1997	The Dragon and The Fly	Director, animator	1 min. LUX (British film company) London Film-Makers' Co-op
1996	Wheel of Life	Director, writer, animator	16 min. Arts Council of Wales & Sianel Pedwar Cymru Awarded at Stuttgart International Festival of Animated Film.
1995	The Lady of The Lake	Director, writer, animator	20 min. Winner Ankara International Film Festival winner Best Experimental Film Mediawave, Audience Award Filmfest Dresden.
1993	Live TV	Director, writer	1 min. The Arts Council of Great Britain and the BBC
1990	Don't Be Afraid	Director, writer	27 min. Channel Four Youth Jury Award at International Short Film Festival Oberhausen & Winner Melbourne International Film Festival
1988	Passing On	Director, writer	30 min. Channel Four
1987	The Mummy's Curse	Director, animator	25 min. Arts Council of Great Britain
1986	Mid Air	Director, writer, animator	16 min. Channel Four Winner Melbourne International Film Festival
1984	The World of Children	Director, writer, animator	15 min. Channel Four
1981	The Decision	Director, writer, animator	33 min. British Film Institute
1978	Animation for Live Action	Director, writer, animator	25 min. British Film Institute
1976	Fate	Director, writer, animator	1 min.
1972/73	Vision On	Director, Animator	Television series for BBC Bristol
1973/75	Pip and Bessie	Creator, director, writer, animator	Television series for Bayerischer Rundfunk
1972	Animation - Allegation	Director, animator	25 min.
1972	Genetics	Director, writer, animator	1 min. Royal College of Art
1971	Cannon Fodder	Director, writer, animator	1 min. Royal College of Art
