= December Bride (film) =

- Directed by: Thaddeus O'Sullivan
- Written by: Sam Hanna Bell (novel); David Rudkin (screenplay)
- Starring: Saskia Reeves; Donal McCann; Ciarán Hinds
- Cinematography: Thaddeus O'Sullivan
- Release date: 29 November 1991
- Countries: County Down, Northern Ireland, United Kingdom

December Bride is a 1990 Irish film directed by Thaddeus O'Sullivan. It stars Saskia Reeves as the title character, with Donal McCann and Ciarán Hinds as the brothers who become her lovers in a conservative rural part of Ulster. It is based on the 1951 novel by Sam Hanna Bell. Principal photography took place in 1990 and it was released on 29 November 1991

The film won a special jury award at the 1990 European Film Awards.

== Plot ==
Sarah Gilmartin comes with her mother Martha to keep house for a widower and his two grown sons, on their farm in Ireland in 1909. After Hamilton Echlin Sr. dies in a boating accident, Sarah's mother, dismayed by his sons' and her own daughter's refusal to attend church and behave in a manner she approves of, leaves the household, but Sarah stays on as housekeeper, and eventually takes first taciturn younger brother Frank (Hinds) and then amiable elder brother Hamilton (McCann), as lovers. When she becomes pregnant and refuses to marry either man or even specify which is the father of the boy she delivers, the local minister (Patrick Malahide) is deeply unsettled by her indifference to convention. She rebuffs his attempts to make her conform and give the child "a name" by declaring that all clergy want is for people's lives, however "botched inside," to appear "smooth to the eye--like lazy work." The community seems only mildly censorious of the relationship between the three, but when Frank yearns for a woman all his own and makes overtures to a local girl, her male relatives beat him savagely in retaliation, crippling him. The film then moves 18 years forward in time: Sarah's daughter Martha pleads with her to marry, as her mother's stubborn unconventionality makes it impossible for her and her brother to be completely accepted by the local community. Realizing that her daughter's happiness is at stake, Sarah relents and marries Hamilton, after which Martha marries too.

== Year-end lists ==
- Honorable mention – Kenneth Turan, Los Angeles Times
