= Thaddeus O'Sullivan =

Irish director, cinematographer and screenwriter

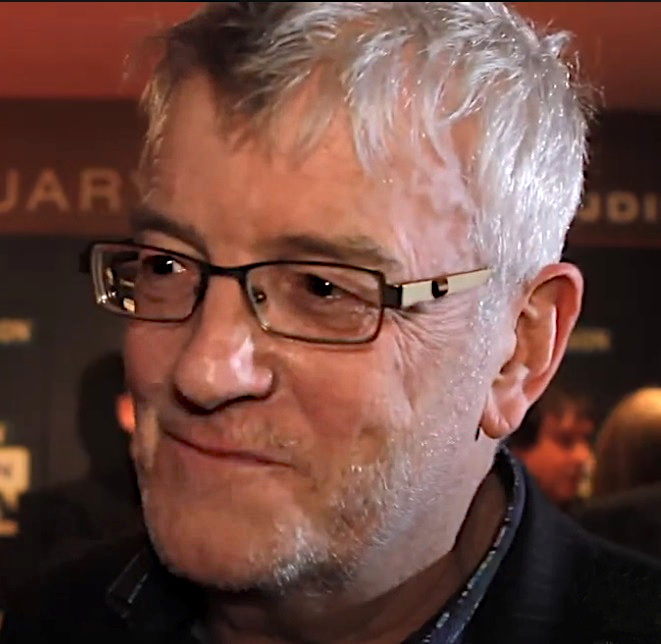
- O'Sullivan at JDIFF 2012
- Born: 2 May 1947 (age 79); Dublin, Ireland
- Occupations: Film director, cinematographer, screenwriter
- Years active: 1976–present

Thaddeus O'Sullivan (born 2 May 1947) is an Irish director, cinematographer, and screenwriter.

== Early career ==
In the early 1980s, O'Sullivan was among a group of filmmakers who co-founded Spectre Productions, a collective that included John Ellis, Simon Hartog, Anna Ambrose, Vera Neubauer, Phil Mulloy, Keith Griffiths and Michael Whyte.

== Filmography ==
Director

Year	Title	Notes
1978	On a Paving Stone Mounted	Also writer
1985	The Woman Who Married Clark Gable	short film
1991	December Bride	
1991	4 Play	1 episode
1992	Tell Tale Hearts	TV miniseries
1994	Seascape	TV movie
1995	Nothing Personal	
1998	Witness to the Mob	TV movie
2000	Ordinary Decent Criminal	
2002	The Heart of Me	
2004	Island at War	TV miniseries
2004	Proof	Series 2 (4 episodes)
2009	Into the Storm	TV movie
2010	Silent Witness	"Voids"
2011	Stella Days	
2013	Silent Witness	"True Love Waits"
2013	Vera	Series 3: "Prodigal Son"
2014	Call the Midwife	"Christmas Special"
2014	Vera	Series 4: "On Harbour Street"
2014	The Crimson Field	Episodes 5 & 6
2014	Amber	
2015	Call the Midwife	Series 4: Episode 1
2016	Shetland	Series 3 Episode 1, Episode 2, Episode 3
2021-2023	Hidden Assets	Series 1 and 2
2023	The Miracle Club	

Cinematographer

Year	Title
1978	On a Paving Stone Mounted
1981	Traveller
1984	Anne Devlin
1984	Pigs
1987	On the Black Hill
1987	Rocinante
1990	Ladder of Swords

== Awards ==
- 1990 won the Silver Rosa Camuna at the Bergamo Film Meeting for December Bride (1991)
- 1990 won the Special Prize of the Jury at the European Film Awards for December Bride (1991)
- 1990 won the FIPRESCI Prize at the Montréal World Film Festival Out-of-Competition for December Bride (1991)
- 1996 won the Audience Award at the Cherbourg-Octeville Festival of Irish & British Film for Nothing Personal (1995)
