= Nothing Personal (1995 film) =

- Directed by: Thaddeus O'Sullivan
- Written by: Daniel Mornin
- Starring: Ian Hart; John Lynch; James Frain; Michael Gambon
- Cinematography: Dick Pope
- Music by: Philip Appleby
- Release date: 1995
- Running time: 83 minutes
- Countries: Ireland; United Kingdom

Nothing Personal is a 1995 Irish-British drama film written by Daniel Mornin and directed by Thaddeus O'Sullivan.

For his performance Ian Hart won the Volpi Cup for best supporting actor at the 52nd Venice International Film Festival.

== Plot ==
In 1975 Belfast, the Troubles are in full effect. A Protestant bar is bombed by Catholics and several people are killed. Hours later, Protestant fighters Kenny and Ginger retaliate by killing a Catholic, starting a full-scale riot. Meanwhile, Liam, a Catholic single father, attempts to help the victims of the fighting, but finds himself on the wrong side of the Protestant-Catholic divide.

== Cast ==
- Ian Hart as Ginger
- John Lynch as Liam
- James Frain as Kenny
- Michael Gambon as Leonard
- Rúaidhrí Conroy as Tommy
- Maria Doyle Kennedy as Ann
- Gerard McSorley as Cecil
- Ciarán Fitzgerald as Young Liam Kelly
- Anthony Brophy as Malachy
