= Blocking of X in Brazil =

2024 event

- Part of Censorship of X
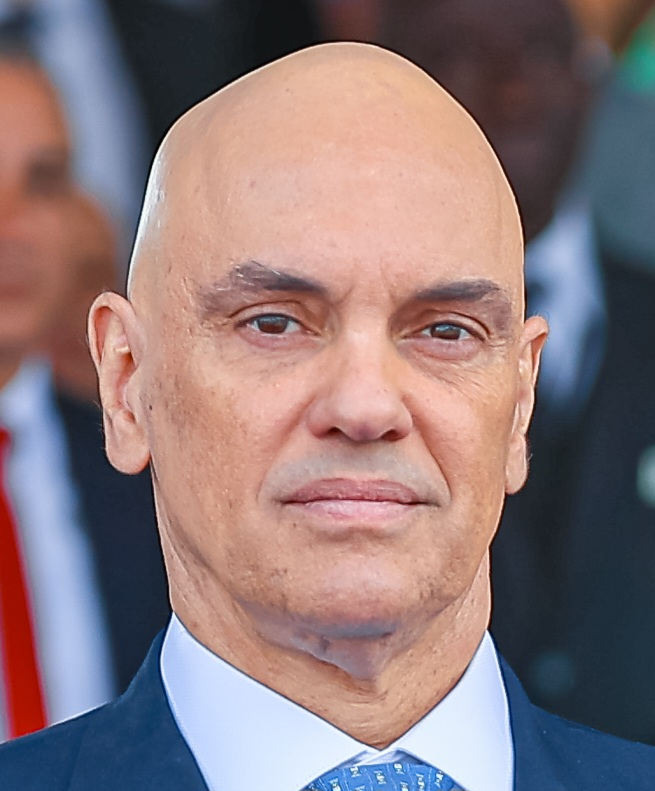
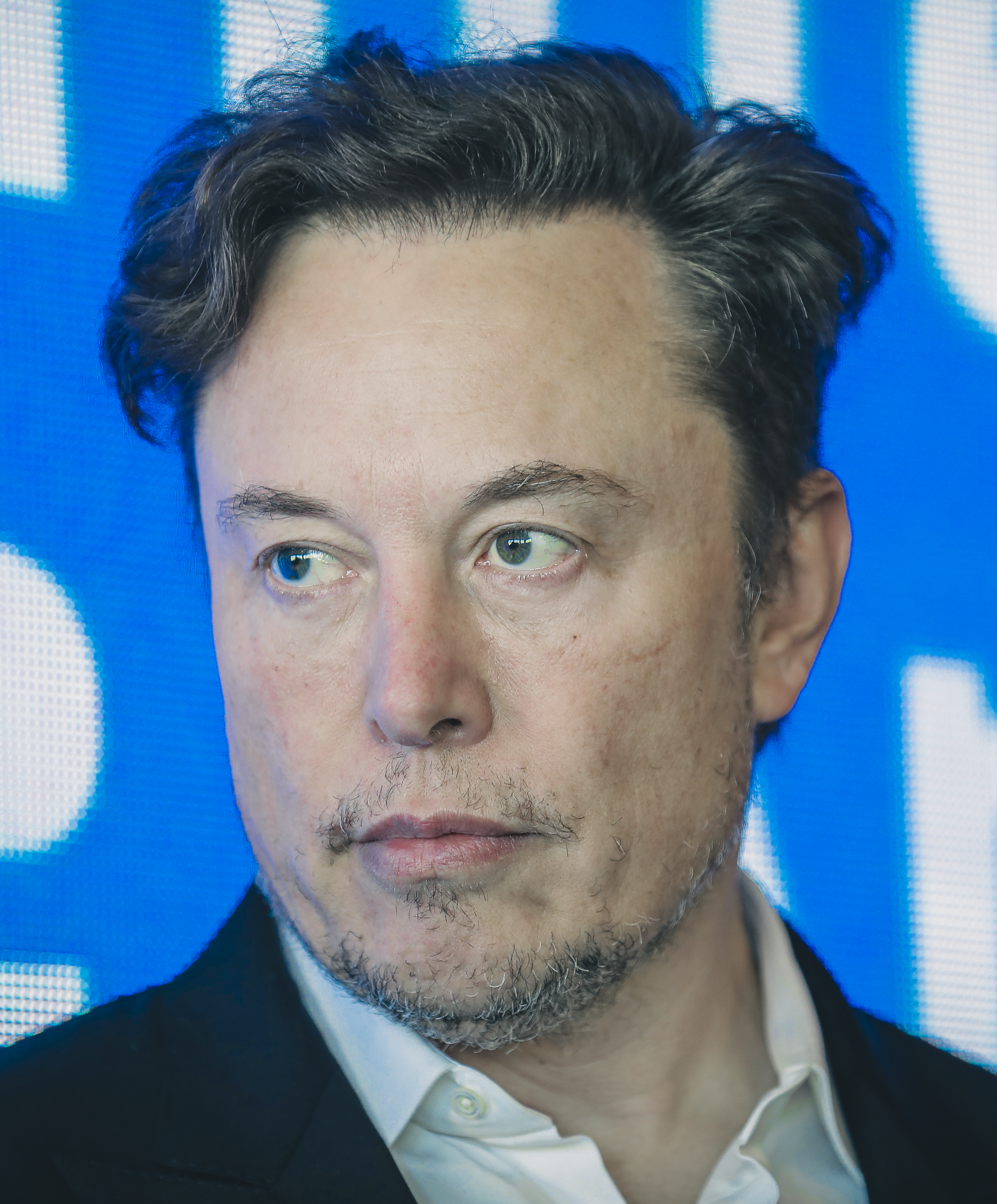
- Alexandre de Moraes (left), who initiated the blocking, and Elon Musk (right), owner of X
- Date: 30 August 2024 – 8 October 2024 (1 month, 1 week and 1 day)
- Caused by: Reinstatement of X accounts associated with the 8 January Brasília attacks blocked by court order; Refusal by X to name a legal representative in Brazil
- Methods: Supreme Federal Court: Ordering Brazilian ISPs to block access to X in the country; Freezing of Starlink assets; Fines toward X Corp.; Fines towards users bypassing the block through virtual private networks; X Corp.: Closure of offices in Brazil (prior to blocking); Non-compliance
- Result: Compliance by X Corp. with the Supreme Federal Court's orders; Lifting of block in Brazil

Parties
Supreme Federal Court	X Corp.

Lead figures
Justice Alexandre de Moraes	Elon Musk

Casualties
- Fined: X Corp.: $5.2 million

From 30 August 2024 to 8 October 2024, Brazil's Supreme Federal Court judge Alexandre de Moraes unilaterally imposed a block of the social networking site X (formerly Twitter) in Brazil. This occurred after the social network's chairman, Elon Musk, refused to appoint a legal representative in the country, which led Moraes to freeze Starlink's financial assets and impose fines for non-compliance. X began to be suspended at the start of the following day.

The decision followed an investigation by the Brazilian Supreme Court into Musk due to X reinstating accounts that were suspended under the terms of a court order. The Court reportedly ordered the removal of far-right accounts associated with the 8 January 2023 attacks in Brasília. The investigation began in April 2024, after Musk stated that he would reinstate the accounts. After the platform settled $5.2 million in fines, appointed a legal representative in Brazil and complied with orders to deactivate accounts, the block was lifted on 8 October 2024.

== Background ==
Musk recognizes that the various countries in which X (formerly known as Twitter) operates have different laws with respect to freedom of speech. On 26 April 2022, Musk tweeted "By 'free speech,' I simply mean that which matches the law." In June 2023, he said that Twitter "doesn't have a choice but to obey local governments. If we don't obey local government law, then we will get shut down. The best we can do is really to hew close to the law in any given country, but it's impossible for us to do more than that or we will be blocked and our people will be arrested."

Brazil enacted an Internet Bill of Rights in 2014. Among other things, the law says that platforms are not legally responsible for user-generated content unless a court orders them to remove the content and the platform refuses. In the lead-up to the 2023 Brazilian Congress attack, election misinformation is said to have circulated on a variety of social media platforms, and people used social media to help plan the attack. It is unclear what entity adjudicates which information has to be regarded as disinformation. After the attack, Moraes ordered several social media platforms, including X, to block specific accounts that had been involved in the planning, stating that the companies would be fined if they failed to comply. The orders were initially sealed before they were disclosed by a committee of the US Congress.

In April 2023, Brazil's Ministry of Justice and Public Security requested Twitter to remove five hundred accounts and posts encouraging school violence. The platform did not comply with the request until an executive decree was issued, threatening fines and a potential ban. In April 2024, American journalist Michael Shellenberger publicly criticized judge Alexandre de Moraes in what he called the "X Files Brazil". Shellenberger shared emails from a former X executive criticizing requests from the Brazilian judiciary for data from users of the platform, which would go against the social network's policy.

== Supreme Federal Court investigation ==
On 6 April 2024, X Corp. stated that it had received a court order by Alexandre de Moraes to suspend several accounts. Elon Musk wrote that he would defy the ruling several hours later and also suggested that users could get around the block by using a virtual private network. In response, Moraes said that he was opening an investigation into Musk, which the Associated Press described as focused on "the dissemination of defamatory fake news and ... obstruction, incitement and criminal organization." Musk suffered a vampetaço from Brazilians on twitter after his allegations.

On 17 August 2024, after Moraes threatened to arrest its legal representative, X Corp. announced that it was closing its office in the country and recalled its staff. On 28 August, Moraes gave X a 24-hour deadline to appoint a new legal representative or face suspension. The summons was issued via a post on X itself. The deadline passed without a new representative being named.

Brazil's Supreme Court suspended the social network in the country after Musk did not meet legal obligations during a crackdown on disinformation. The tension grew as Musk refused to block accounts tied to former president Jair Bolsonaro. Musk responded by accusing Moraes of undermining democracy. On 21 September 2024, Moraes stated in a decision that X had still not fully complied with requirements to lift its suspension and gave it five days to submit additional documents.

On March 10, 2026, at the request of Prosecutor General of the Republic, Paulo Gonet, Supreme Court Minister Alexandre de Moraes closed the investigation into Elon Musk for alleged obstruction of justice and involvement with digital militias. Gonet cited the inexistence of "evidence to support the initial claim of malicious manipulation by the social media X" to justify the request.

== Blocking ==
Decision of the Supreme Federal Court regarding the suspension of X in Brazil

On 30 August 2024, Alexandre de Moraes ordered internet service providers to block access to X, instaured a daily fine of fifty thousand reals (US$9,104) for users who bypass the ban through virtual private networks (VPNs), and froze Starlink's finances in Brazil. To enforce the suspension order against X, Moraes directed Brazil's National Telecommunications Agency (ANATEL) to take action. The order will remain in force until the platform complies with the decisions of the Supreme Federal Court, pays fines totaling R$18.3 million (US$3.33 million), and appoints a representative in Brazil, a requirement grounded in the country's law. Moraes had also instructed Apple and Google to remove X and VPN applications from their virtual stores, but mitigated that decision on the same day, instead suspending the withdrawal of VPN apps in virtual stores until there is a manifestation of X in the records of the apps, citing concerns about potential "unnecessary" disruptions.

In the order, Moraes described Musk as an "outlaw" who would "allow the massive spread of disinformation, hate speech and attacks on the democratic rule of law, violating the free choice of the electorate, by keeping voters away from real and accurate information." X began to be suspended at approximately 12:10 a.m. (UTC−03:00) on 31 August. On 1 September, Starlink told ANATEL that it would not obey the order to block X until its assets were unfrozen, but it reversed course two days later, saying that it would comply. On 2 September, a five-judge panel of the Supreme Court affirmed the ban.

On 13 September, Moraes unfroze Starlink's finances after the Brazilian government took R$18.35 million (US$3.34 million) from X and Starlink to cover the fines owed; however, X remained blocked at the time. On 18 September 2024, X evaded the block by rerouting its traffic through Cloudflare for requests originating from Brazil. X said the restoration of service was an "inadvertent and temporary" side-effect of switching network providers, and that the change was made because the block ordered in Brazil affected its internet infrastructure that allowed it to provide service to the rest of Latin America, according to the company. By 19 September Cloudflare had reportedly agreed to isolate X traffic, enabling Brazilian internet service providers to resume blocking traffic. On 23 September, Cloudflare CEO Matthew Prince stated that Cloudflare neither helped X evade the block in Brazil nor assisted the country's regulators as they sought to restore the block. Moraes fined X five million reals (US$910,400) for violating the suspension.

== Reactions ==
=== X and Elon Musk ===
Reacting to the decision, Musk wrote on his X account: "Free speech is the bedrock of democracy and an unelected pseudo-judge in Brazil is destroying it for political purposes." Shortly after its suspension, X created the "@AlexandreFiles" account, purportedly in order to shed "a light on the abuses of Brazilian law committed by Alexandre de Moraes". The account began posting sealed orders from Moraes on 31 August. The orders have not been redacted, and have revealed private information including full names and Social Security numbers. Musk retweeted calls for protest and for Moraes' impeachment. He also suggested that the U.S. government intervene, confiscating Brazilian assets and halting foreign aid.

=== Government officials ===
In an interview on 30 August, Brazilian president Luiz Inácio Lula da Silva emphasized that Elon Musk should respect the decisions of the Supreme Federal Court, criticizing him for allegedly offending local authorities. Lula da Silva stated that Brazilian society does not have an "inferiority complex". He later said that the world could learn from Brazil's example, and it's not "obliged to put up with Musk's far-right free-for-all just because he is rich." According to journalist Andréia Sadi, behind the scenes at the Supreme Federal Court, the judges assessed that the decision was severe but necessary, as Musk was believed to have intentionally escalated the situation. Sadi reported that there was a consensus between judges that, despite this, Moraes would have committed excesses by blocking the Starlink accounts, which could potentially tarnish the image of the Brazilian judiciary.

Members of the National Congress of Brazil expressed varied opinions about the decision. Right-wing Nikolas Ferreira, a member of the Chamber of Deputies, stated: "Tirants [sic] want to turn Brazil into another commie dictatorship but we won't back down. I repeat: do not vote on those who don't respect free speech. Orwell was right". Right-wing congresswoman Bia Kicis stated that "the consequences of Alexandre de Moraes' attacks on Elon Musk, X and Starlink will be regrettable for Brazilians". She also urged Rodrigo Pacheco, the President of the Federal Senate, to act. Congressman Marcel van Hattem wrote on X: "I am tweeting this with VPN." On the other hand, left-wing deputy Erika Hilton wrote, "If billionaires want to have companies that make billions in these parts, they need to learn to respect the laws. Long live the rule of law and national sovereignty." The decision to block Starlink's financial assets in the country was criticized by Arthur Lira, the President of the Chamber of Deputies, at an event for investors promoted by XP Inc. In the United States, Wisconsin politician John Macco called for the relocation of the National Football League's game in São Paulo on 6 September (which featured the Green Bay Packers) to the United States, citing the blocking of X as one of his reasons.

=== Civil society ===
Beto Simonetti, the president of the Brazilian Bar Association, announced that the association would request the Supreme Court to review the section of the decision imposing a fine for VPN users, calling it a breach of due process. The classical liberal New Party announced that it would challenge the ban in court. The social network Bluesky, which was founded as a competitor to X, gained over one million new Brazilian users between 30 and 31 August. On 7 September, thousands protested against the ban in São Paulo.

=== Media ===
The decision received widespread international attention. The New York Times described the situation as the most significant test so far for Musk's efforts to turn the social network into a platform where almost anything is possible. The Associated Press highlighted that the measure intensified the ongoing conflict between Musk and Moraes over freedom of speech, far-right accounts, and disinformation. The Washington Post noted that the action followed Musk's refusal to appoint a legal representative in Brazil. Meanwhile, El País stated that Moraes' decision represented a stringent public sanction concerning the limits of free speech and efforts to combat disinformation. As of now, it is unclear who would get to decide what is to be regarded as disinformation. American journalist Glenn Greenwald questioned the legal basis of Moraes' actions, suggesting that the judge was effectively creating new laws without the oversight of Brazil's Congress.

== See also ==
- Brazilian Civil Rights Framework for the Internet
- Censorship of X
  - Blocking of Twitter in Nigeria
- Censorship in Brazil
- Protecting Americans from Foreign Adversary Controlled Applications Act
