= John Ellis (media academic) =

Media academic and television producer

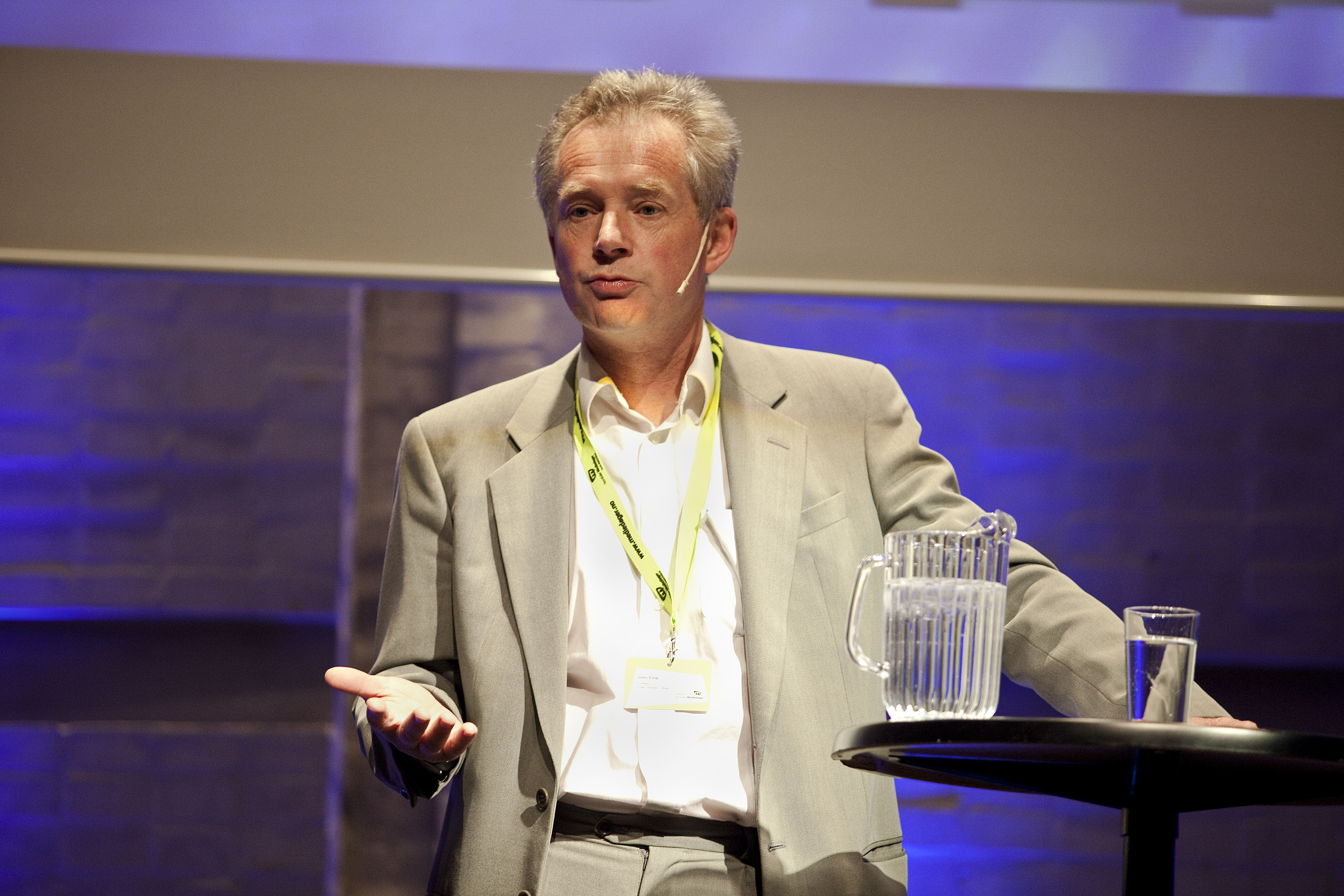
- John Ellis at 7 May 2010 conference.
- Born: 23 May 1952 (age 74)
- Occupations: TV producer, professor of media arts

John Ellis (born 23 May 1952) is a British former TV producer and professor of media arts at Royal Holloway, University of London. Ellis studied English at the University of Cambridge 1970-3 and at the Centre for Contemporary Cultural Studies at University of Birmingham 1973-6. From 1978 to 1982 he taught Film Studies at University of Kent at Canterbury.

== TV Producer 1982–1999 ==
In 1982 he joined Simon Hartog and Keith Griffiths to form Large Door, the company that bid successfully to make Visions, a magazine series on world cinema for Channel 4 when it opened in 1982. Visions ran for three series until 1985. Griffiths left the company in 1984, but Ellis and Hartog continued producing documentaries separately and together until Hartog's death in 1992.

Large Door made over 100 documentaries until it ceased production in 1999. The company produced two documentaries on the Cinema of China presented by Tony Rayns: Cinema in China (1983) outlined the history, hitherto scarcely known in the West; and New Chinese Cinema (1989) concentrated on the 'Fifth Generation.'

Large Door also produced:

- Beyond Citizen Kane a history of TV in Brazil (directed and co-produced by Simon Hartog)
- The Holy Family Album from a script by Angela Carter
- This Food Business, a current affairs series on Britain's food supply
- Distilling Whisky Galore!, on the making of the 1949 British film
- Riding the Tiger (1997), directed by Po-Chih Leong and Sze Wing Leong, chronicling the period up to the British hand-over of Hong Kong to China.

As a leading producer, John Ellis was elected vice-chair of the producers' organisation PACT (1989–93).

He also co-founded 'Spectre' a collective of filmmakers that included Simon Hartog, Anna Ambrose, Michael Whyte, Vera Neubauer, Thaddeus O'Sullivan, Phil Mulloy and Keith Griffiths.

== Media academic ==
Ellis was a visiting professor at Bergen University in the Media Studies department from 1991 to 2002. In 1995 he joined the staff of the Media School at Bournemouth University, and became a professor in 1999. He joined the Media Arts Department at Royal Holloway University of London in September 2002.

He is now chair of BUFVC, the British Universities' Film and Video Council. He was an editorial board member of Screen from 1974 to 1984.

== Medium theory and television history ==
Ellis's work concentrates on television and related media. In 1982, he developed a medium theory approach, proposing that television's typical regime of spectatorship is that of the 'glance' rather than the more cinematic one of the 'gaze', and exploring the segmented and repetitive structure of TV programming.

In Seeing Things (2000) he proposed the periodisation of television history into the three eras of 'scarcity', 'availability' and 'plenty', and applied the psychoanalytic concept of working through to television in the latter two eras. He also examined the crucial role played by scheduling in the organisation of creativity in TV and of the TV experience.

Recently he has developed the concept of witness in relation to audio-visual material in a debate with, among others, John Durham Peters and Paul Frosh. This work is extended in his Documentary: Witness and Self-Revelation (2012) which applies an interactionist approach derived from Erving Goffman to the understanding of documentary. He argues in addition that contemporary viewers, now thoroughly familiar with the processes of filming and being filmed, adopt a much more skeptical attitude to the 'factuality' of documentary and to the ethics of filmmaker-subject interaction.

His work on television history includes several articles on Channel 4; on critical issues including the construction of a canon of TV work; the importance of overlooked items such as interstitials; and decade-long involvement in the EU funded archival projects Videoactive and EUScreen

In 2013 he won a European Research Council grant of €1,600,000 for ADAPT a five-year study of the history of technology in TV broadcasting, concentrating particularly on the standard forms of production (both on film and on video) and the ways that these 'technological arrays' were adopted and brought into regular use.

== Selected publications ==
Ellis's books include:

- Documentary, Witness and Self-revelation (Routledge 2012)
- TV FAQ (IB Tauris, 2007)
- Seeing Things: Television in the Age of Uncertainty (IB Tauris, 2000)
- Visible Fictions: Cinema, Television, Video (Routledge 1982, 2nd edition 1992)
- Language and Materialism (Routledge 1977) with Rosalind Coward

Ellis's articles include:

- "Interstitials: How the Bits in Between Define the Programmes" in Ephemeral Media, ed Paul Grainge (Palgrave Macmillan) 2011
- "Mundane Witnessing" in Media Witnessing, ed Paul Frosh, Amit Pinchevski,(Palgrave Macmillan) 2008
- "Is it Possible to Construct a Canon of Television Programmes? Immanent Reading versus Textual Historicism" in Re-Viewing Television Histories, ed Helen Wheatley (I.B.Tauris) 2007
- "Visions, a Channel 4 Experiment 1982-5" in Experimental British Television, ed Laura Mulvey, Jamie Sexton, (Manchester University Press) 2007
- "Documentary and Truth on Television: The Crisis of 1999" in New Challenges in Documentary, ed J.Corner & A.Rosenthal (Manchester University Press) 2005
- "Television Production" in The Television Studies Reader, ed. R.Allen & A.Hill (Routledge) 2003
