= Ros Coward =

British academic, journalist and writer

- Born: United Kingdom

Academic background
- Education: Cambridge University
- Thesis: The patriarchal theory: some modes of explanation of kinship in the social sciences (1981)

Academic work
- Institutions: Roehampton University
- Main interests: Journalism
- Notable works: "This Novel Changes Lives": Are Women's Novels Feminist Novels?
- Notable ideas: Feminist issues and cultural semiotics
- Website: http://www.roscoward.co.uk

Rosalind Coward is a journalist and writer. She is an Emeritus Professor of journalism at Roehampton University, and a former member of the board of Greenpeace UK (2005–12).

== Education ==
Coward gained her first degree in English literature from Cambridge University and her PhD from the Thames Polytechnic (now the University of Greenwich) in 1981.

== Career ==
She has been a columnist for The Guardian since 1992 and was previously a regular contributor to The Observer and Marxism Today. She wrote a regular column for The Guardian's Comment pages between 1995 and 2004. From 2005 to 2008 she was the author of the regular "Looking After Mother" column for the Saturday Guardian's Family section, about the problems faced by those caring for people with dementia.

Her career in journalism includes feature writing for many national newspapers and magazines including the London Evening Standard, Daily Mail, Cosmopolitan and the New Statesman.

She is known for her writing on feminist issues and in cultural semiotics. Her books including Female Desire and Our Treacherous Hearts are still widely cited, as is the essay "Are Women's Novels Feminist Novels", originally written for Feminist Review.

She has a strong interest in environmental issues, and writes a regular column for The Ecologist magazine.

== Selected bibliography ==
=== Books ===
- Coward, Rosalind; Ellis, John (1977). Language and materialism: developments in semiology and the theory of the subject. London Boston: Routledge and Paul. ISBN 9780415099073.
- Coward, Rosalind (1983). Patriarchal precedents: sexuality and social relations. London Boston: Routledge & Kegan Paul. ISBN 9780002555517.
- Coward, Rosalind (1985). Female desires: how they are sought, bought, and packaged. New York: Grove Press. ISBN 9780802150332.
- Coward, Rosalind (1989). The whole truth: the myth of alternative health. London Boston: Faber and Faber. ISBN 9780571141142.
- Coward, Rosalind (1992). Our treacherous hearts: why women let men get their way. London Boston: Faber and Faber. ISBN 9780571141562.
- Coward, Rosalind (2000). Sacred cows: is feminism relevant to the new millennium. London: HarperCollins. ISBN 9780006548201.
- Coward, Rosalind (2004). Diana: the portrait. Kansas City, Mo: Andrews McMeel Pub. ISBN 9780740747137.
- Parkin, Kate, ed. (2006). Mandela: the authorised portrait. Mac Maharaj (editorial consultant), Ahmed Kathrada (editorial consultant), Mike Nichol (narrative), Tim Couzens (interview), Rosalind Coward (interview), Amina Frense (interview). London Auckland, New Zealand: Bloomsbury in association with PQ Blackwell Ltd. ISBN 9780747581703.
- Coward, Rosalind (2013). Speaking personally: the rise of subjective and confessional journalism. Basingstoke, Hampshire, England New York: Palgrave Macmillan. ISBN 9780230360204.
- Coward, Rosalind (2017). Nature matters: journalism, the environment and everyday life. London: Desman Publications. ISBN 9780995654402.

=== Articles ===
- Coward, Rosalind (1980). ""This Novel Changes Lives": are women's novels feminist novels? A response to Rebecca O'Rourke's article "Summer Reading"". Feminist Review. 5 (5): 53–64. doi:10.2307/1394698. JSTOR 1394698.

Reprinted as Coward, Rosalind (2011), ""This Novel Changes Lives": are women's novels feminist novels? A response to Rebecca O'Rourke's article "Summer Reading"", in Eagleton, Mary (ed.), Feminist literary theory: a reader (3rd ed.), Oxford, UK / Cambridge, Massachusetts, US: Blackwell, pp. 199–202, ISBN 9781405183130.

- Coward, Rosalind (1985), ""This Novel Changes Lives": Are Women's Novels Feminist Novels?", in Showalter, Elaine (ed.), The New Feminist Criticism, New York: Pantheon, ISBN 9780394726472.
- Coward, Rosalind (March 1987). "Sex after AIDS". New Internationalist. 169.

Reprinted as Coward, Rosalind (1996), "Sex after AIDS", in Jackson, Stevi; Scott, Sue (eds.), Feminism and sexuality: a reader, New York: Columbia University Press, pp. 245–247, ISBN 9780231107082.

- Coward, Rosalind (2008), "The Monarchy", in Franklin, Bob (ed.), Pulling Newspapers Apart, London New York: Routledge, ISBN 9780203630709.
- Coward, Rosalind (2011), "Female desire: women's sexuality today", in Eagleton, Mary (ed.), Feminist literary theory: a reader (3rd ed.), Oxford, UK / Cambridge, Massachusetts, US: Blackwell, pp. 173–177, ISBN 9781405183130.
