= Brazilian Congressional Bill No. 2630 =

Bill to oversee and regulate digital platforms and combat the spread of fake news

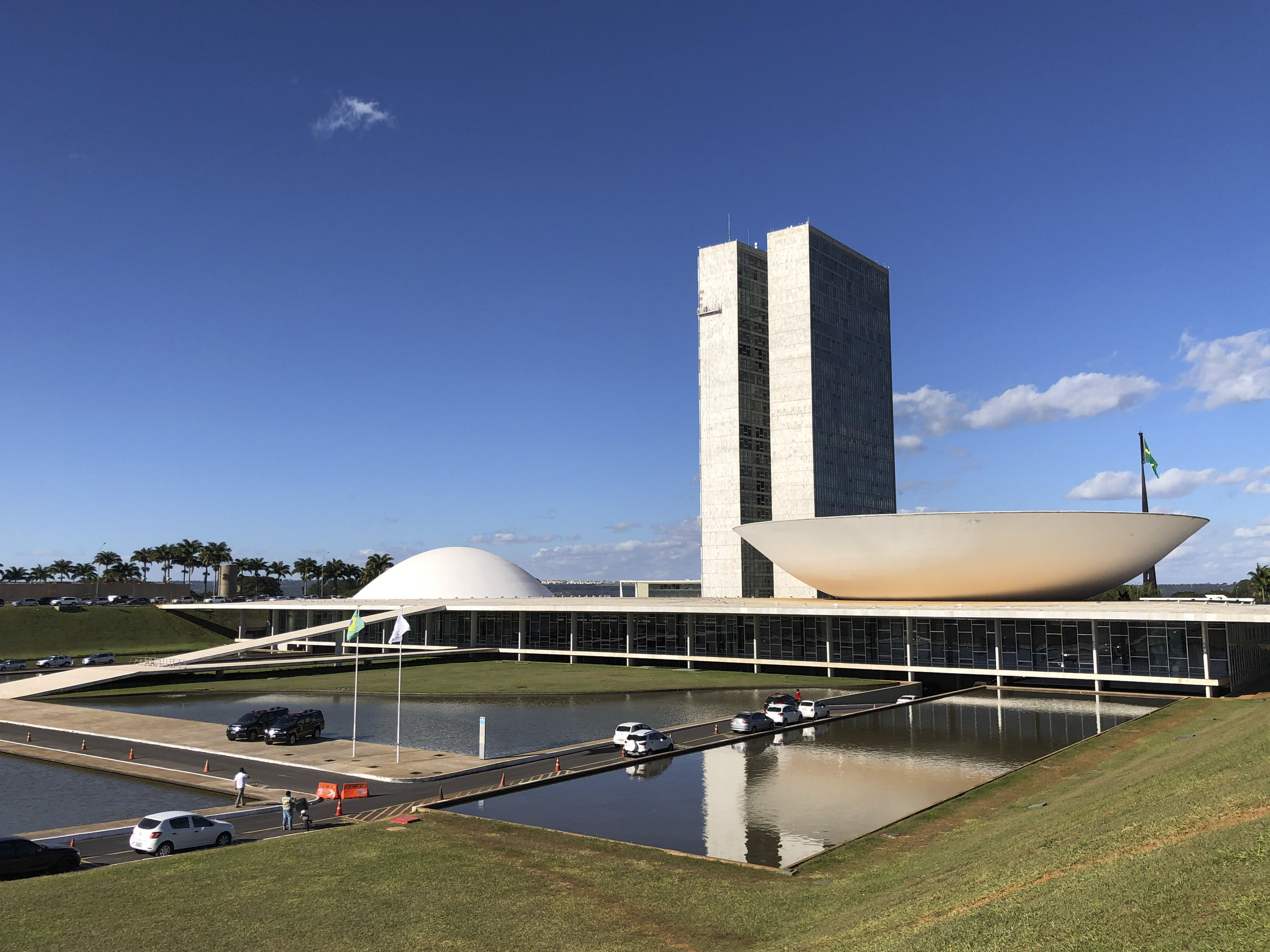

National Congress of Brazil
- Long title: Institutes the Brazilian Law of Freedom, Responsibility and Transparency in the Internet
- Citation: PL 2630/2020
- Territorial extent: Whole of Brazil
- Passed by: Federal Senate
- Passed: 30 June 2020
- Considered by: Chamber of Deputies

Legislative history

Initiating chamber: Federal Senate
- Introduced by: Alessandro Vieira (Cidadania-SE)
- Introduced: 13 May 2020
- First reading: 13 May 2020
- Second reading: 30 June 2020
- Voting summary: 44 voted for; 32 voted against; 2 abstained; 2 absent; 1 present not voting

Revising chamber: Chamber of Deputies
- Received from the Federal Senate: 3 July 2020
- Committee responsible: Science, Technology and Innovation
- First reading: 3 July 2020
- Status: Pending

The Brazilian Congressional Bill No. 2630, officially Brazilian Law on Freedom, Responsibility and Transparency on the Internet and dubbed the Fake News Bill (Portuguese: PL das Fake News) by its supporters and Censorship Bill (Portuguese: PL da Censura) by its opponents, is a pending bill being considered by the National Congress of Brazil which is intended to fight the spread of disinformation, including fake news, in social networks and messaging apps.

Among the measures proposed in the bill are the mandatory identification of accounts in social networks and instant messaging apps, the creation of mechanisms for content checking, the accountability of digital platforms and users for damage caused by spreading fake news.

The bill caused controversy and debates among specialists, politicians and civil society, with opinions divided as to its effectiveness and possible impacts on freedom of speech and privacy of users in the internet.

== History ==
The bill was published on 30 June 2020 by Senator Alessandro Vieira (Cidadania-SE) and other parliamentarians, with the intention of creating measures for creating accountability for the spreading of fake news in social networks and digital platforms.

The bill aims to achieve this by creating a Council for Transparency and Accountability in the Internet, the objective of which is to inspect the digital platforms and guarantee transparency and accountability of their content. It also establishes the mandatory identification of users in platforms and messaging apps, also the prohibition of creation of fake accounts.

In addition, the bill requires digital platforms to check the veracity of information that can cause damage to health, public security and economic order, and to delete or immediately suspend profiles that violate the rules of conduct.

The bill caused controversy since its introduction, specially about its effectiveness in fighting the spreading of fake news and its possible impact on freedom of speech and digital privacy. The bill passed in the Federal Senate on 30 June 2020 and it's pending in the Chamber of Deputies, with voting scheduled for 2 May 2023.

== Corporate response ==
In early May 2023, when the bill was about to be approved, Google and Telegram used their own platforms to express their opposition to the bill to their Brazilian users, and soon after were forced to back down by government institutions.

On May 1, 2023, Google placed an ad against the bill on its home search page in Brazil calling on its users to ask congressional representatives to oppose the legislation. Government and judiciary accused the company of undue interference in the congressional debate, saying it could amount to abuse of economic power and ordering the company to change the ad within two hours of notification or face fines of R$1 million (2023) (US$178,794.92) per non-compliance hour. The company then promptly removed the ad.

On May 9, Telegram told its users that the bill would end freedom of speech in the country. The Supreme Federal Court ruled that Telegram must issue a retraction message to the same users, otherwise it would face a 3-day block and an hourly fine of R$500,000 (2023) (US$89,397.46). The company complied with the ruling.

On May 11, the president of the Chamber of Deputies requested that the directors of Google and Telegram in the country be investigated for their actions against the bill, describing these actions as forceful and abusive of the companies' hegemonic positions in the market, motivated by economic interests, and cited possible crimes against democratic institutions.
