= Simon Hartog =

British film director

- Born: 8 February 1940; London, England
- Died: 19 August 1992 (aged 52); London, England
- Occupation: Film director

Simon Hartog (8 February 1940 – 18 August 1992) was a British filmmaker who worked as both director and producer. He helped develop an independent film industry in the United Kingdom (UK), founding London Film-Makers' Co-op in the 1960s, key to the avant-garde; working on independent documentaries, and founding the production company, Large Door Ltd. Through the Independent Filmmakers' Association, he campaigned for an independent Channel 4. Through his company, Hartog produced a series on world cinema, Visions, that ran on the channel for three years.

Long interested in the Third Cinema of African and Latin American nations, Hartog at one time worked for The Other Cinema, a distribution company in the UK, to gain such films wider audiences. In the 1970s, he served as a consultant to help the newly independent Mozambique set up a film industry.

After having grown up from age eight in the United States, he returned to England and Italy in the 1960s for graduate work and settled in the UK.

== Life ==
Hartog was born in England but lived in Chicago, Illinois from the age of eight with his mother, after his parents divorced. He attended local schools until college. He always retained what the British perceived as an American accent, but, after many years in England as an adult, he no longer sounded entirely American to people from the United States. In the 1960s, trying to avoid being drafted for the unpopular Vietnam War, which he opposed, he returned to England for graduate work after college.

Hartog took a higher degree in politics at the LSE and studied film-making at the Centro Sperimentale, the Italian film school. There he met Antonella Ibba, who became his longtime companion and wife.

== Career ==
His first taste of film-making in Britain was acting in Peter Watkins' The War Game (he had the role of the jumpy GI who triggers the nuclear strike). He worked for a time as a producer/director for BBC Panorama, making programmes on Ronald Reagan, then governor of California; the May 1968 events in Paris, and censorship. But the programme's editors proved unreceptive to some of his other proposals, and Hartog soon left the BBC to work freelance.

Hartog was a founder-member of the London Film-Makers' Co-op, the key organisation in the development during the 1960s of an independent British avant-garde. During this time, he took a wide range of jobs, from researching a report on the possible nationalisation of the film industry for the industry union ACTT, to helping Tony Rayns edit the short-lived film magazine Cinema Rising.

Hartog's commitment to cinema included a passionate interest in the Third Cinema of Africa and Latin America. Whilst working at London's principal Third Cinema distributors, The Other Cinema, he was offered the post as consultant to the Frelimo Party government in Mozambique, which became independent in 1975. They wanted him to set up a state film industry. The principal result was an effective regular newsreel company, Kucha Kanema.

On his return to the UK, Hartog initiated and inspired a collective of young feature filmmakers in Spectre Productions. They included Stephen Dwoskin, Anna Ambrose, Vera Neubauer, Phil Mulloy and Michael Whyte. The co-operative produced several low-budget features (usually with Hartog as producer) in its 15 years of operations.

Hartog was active in the Independent Filmmakers' Association, a pressure-group that campaigned for an independent and innovative Channel 4. The success of that campaign led him to join John Ellis (media academic) and Keith Griffiths in founding the production company Large Door Ltd. It produced the channel's world cinema programme, Visions, for three years.

Just before his death, Hartog completed Beyond Citizen Kane, his film on the development of TV in Brazil, concentrating on the role of Rede Globo, the largest media conglomerate in the country. The documentary is critical of the company's ties to the military dictatorship and likened the conglomerate's leader, Roberto Marinho, to the Citizen Kane figure of the 1941 American film for manipulation of news.

During its development, Hartog had made signed agreements with various cultural and political groups in Brazil to give them the non-TV rights, in order to provide for wide distribution in the country. In addition, his company sold copies of the film in the UK at cost, and members of the Brazilian community bought copies to send to associates in Brazil. Hartog died during the final editing of the film, which Ellis completed, and before the programme was finally broadcast in 1991 in the UK.

When the film was scheduled for its first public screening in Brazil in March 1994 at the Río de Janeiro Museum of Modern Art, Rede Globo went to court, obtaining an order for the posters and copy of the film to be confiscated by the military police. The company continued to try to prevent the film's screening in Brazil, where it was never broadcast on TV. But, universities and political groups obtained copies and showed it unofficially (and, after a court case in 1995), officially through the 1990s. With the internet boom of the early 21st century, the film was distributed digitally, including being put on sharing networks. It has been seen more than 600,000 times, according to counts just on YouTube and Google.

== Tribute by Tony Rayns ==
Hartog was a unique figure in what passes for British film culture. He was a perennial outsider who spent most of his life dreaming up alternatives to the mainstream orthodoxies, but nonetheless took a serious academic interest in the political and economic structures of the film industry. He was also one of the very few British film-makers with an informed and passionate commitment to non-British cinemas, especially those of Africa, the Middle East and South America. And he was a lifelong opponent of censorship, the first British director to have a film screened in the 'Directors' Fortnight' at the Cannes Film Festival, and a consultant to the Frelimo government on setting up a state film industry in Mozambique

Obituary, The Independent, 20 August 1992

== Filmography (selected) ==
As director

- Beyond Citizen Kane (1993)
- Brazil: Cinema, Sex and the Generals (made 1985 but withdrawn after scheduling; eventually transmitted 1991 - see below)
- Nicely Offensive (1991), (George Melly interviews Dusan Makavejev about 1971 Mysteries of the Organism - see below)

As producer

- Further and Particular (1988), directed by Stephen Dwoskin

Nicely Offensive, an edited version of Mysteries of the Organism, and Brazil: Cinema, Sex and the Generals were shown consecutively on the same night in 1991.
