= Beyond Citizen Kane =

1993 British documentary film by Simon Hartog

- Directed by: Simon Hartog
- Written by: Simon Hartog
- Produced by: John Ellis
- Narrated by: Chris Kelly
- Edited by: John Ellis; Simon Hartog
- Distributed by: Channel 4
- Release date: 10 May 1993
- Running time: 105 minutes
- Country: United Kingdom
- Languages: English; Portuguese

Beyond Citizen Kane is a 1993 British documentary film directed by Simon Hartog, produced by John Ellis, and first broadcast on Channel 4. It details the dominant position of the Globo media group, the largest in Brazil, and discusses the group's influence, power, and political connections. Globo's president and founder Roberto Marinho was criticised and compared to the fictional newspaper tycoon Charles Foster Kane, created by Orson Welles for the 1941 film Citizen Kane. According to the documentary, Marinho's media group engages in manipulation of news to influence public opinion.

TV Globo (known as Rede Globo at the time of filming) objected to the film's position and tried to buy Brazilian rights, but Hartog had already made agreements to give non-television rights to political and cultural groups in Brazil. However, the documentary cannot be broadcast on television in Brazil since it contains large sections of footage owned by Globo. Nevertheless, copies sold in Britain reached Brazil in the 1990s and circulated widely there.

In addition, since the internet boom of the early 21st century, the film has been released on video-sharing websites such as YouTube and Google Video.

== Plot summary ==
The documentary tracks Globo's involvement with and support of the Brazilian military government; its illegal partnership of the 1960s with the American group Time-Life; Marinho's political connections (notably its owner's connections with Antonio Carlos Magalhães, Minister of Telecommunications) and manoeuvres (such as airing in Jornal Nacional, the network's prime time news programme since 1969, highlights of a 1989 presidential debate edited in a way as to favour Fernando Collor de Mello); and a controversial deal involving shares of NEC Corporation and government contracts. It features interviews with 21 people, including noted Brazilian politicians and cultural figures, such as politicians Leonel Brizola and Antonio Carlos Magalhães, singer-songwriter Chico Buarque, former Justice Minister Armando Falcão, politician Luiz Inácio Lula da Silva (who would serve as President from 2003 to 2010 and again since 2023); and former employees Walter Clark, Wianey Pinheiro and Armando Nogueira.

The title refers to the 1941 film Citizen Kane, whose fictional newspaper tycoon Charles Foster Kane was created by the director and actor Orson Welles. He was believed to have been based on the American publisher William Randolph Hearst, noted for creating yellow journalism and exploiting the press. The 1993 British documentary criticised Globo's president and founder Roberto Marinho for his close ties to the military dictatorship and suggestively compared him to the Kane figure for manipulation of news.

== Controversy ==
=== Dispute with Globo over British rights ===
The documentary was first shown on 10 May 1993 in the United Kingdom, broadcast of the programme had been delayed for a year as Rede Globo disputed the programme makers' right under British law to use short extracts from Globo programmes without permission, for the purposes of "critical comment and review".

During this period of legal manoeuvring, Simon Hartog, the director, died after a long illness. The process of editing was taken over by his co-producer John Ellis. When the film was eventually broadcast, the production company sold copies in the United Kingdom at cost. Many individuals in the Brazilian community in Britain sent copies to associates and friends in Brazil.

=== Censorship in Brazil ===
The film was also to be shown at the Museum of Image and Sound (MIS) of São Paulo. The MIS copy was confiscated after two screenings, according to a later account by Anhaia Geraldo Mello, then coordinator of the TV and Video Museum. He said the order came from the governor of São Paulo, Luiz Antônio Fleury Filho. The official story at the time was that the film was cancelled because of technical problems.

Through the 1990s, the film was illegally screened by universities, political groups and unions, as copies were made available informally. In 1995, Globo requested in court to confiscate copies of the film available at the library of the University of São Paulo, but it was over-ruled. The film was officially restricted to university groups until the 2000s, when the internet boom in Brazil made it impossible to control access, as people could put it on the web (and did). (Brazil is the fifth country internationally by number of web users and first in time spent by individuals on Internet use monthly.)

== Screenings and internet phenomenon ==
At the time of release, Rede Globo sought to buy the Brazilian rights to the programme, presumably seeking to suppress it. But during production, as part of his working with groups in Brazil, Hartog had made agreements to give them the non-television rights to ensure wide showing of the programme by both cultural and political organisations. Globo lost interest in buying the programme when they learned this, and as of 2015, it had not been broadcast on television in Brazil.

But numerous VHS and DVD copies have circulated, and the documentary has become available on the internet, via peer-to-peer networks and video-sharing websites, such as YouTube and Google Video (where it has been watched nearly 600,000 times). Contrary to popular belief, the movie is also legally available in Brazil, though copies are difficult to find, mostly buried in libraries and private collections.

On 20 August 2009, the newspaper Folha de S.Paulo reported that the Record television network bought the broadcasting rights of the documentary from producer John Ellis for less than US$20,000. This happened after the Globo and Record attacked each other through their media during an investigation conducted by the Public Prosecutor's Office against Edir Macedo and other high profile members of the Universal Church of the Kingdom of God has owned Rede Record since 9 November 1989.

On 14 February 2011, the newspaper Jornal do Brasil (quoting the network's spokesperson) reported that Rede Record would broadcast the documentary in 2012.

== See also ==
- Criticism of Rede Globo
- Partido da Imprensa Golpista
- Concentration of media ownership
- Censorship in Brazil
- 1993 in British television
