= Phil Mulloy =

British animator (1948–2025)

- Mulloy in 2005
- Born: 29 August 1948; Wallasey, Cheshire, England
- Died: 10 July 2025 (aged 76)
- Education: Ravensbourne College (BFA); Royal College of Art (MFA)
- Known for: Animation
- Style: experimental; satirical
- Spouse: Vera Neubauer
- Children: Daniel and Lucy

Phil Mulloy (29 August 1948 – 10 July 2025) was a British and Irish animator. He worked as a screenwriter and director of live-action films until the late 1980s before becoming an animator. His animations have been described as "satirical grotesque" and often portray the dark side of human nature and contemporary social, political, and religious values in a humorous and at times, shocking way. His visual style is distinctive in its use of primitive, often skeletal figures and minimalist backgrounds. Mulloy made over 30 animated films, many of which are in themed groupings based on Hollywood genres. He won many international awards for his work and conducted workshops to mentor young animators.

== Early life and education ==
Mulloy was born in Wallasey, Cheshire, England on 29 August 1948, to an Irish father, Michael Mulloy, who migrated to Liverpool to work on the docks and an English mother named Elizabeth.

Mulloy studied painting at Ravensbourne College followed by film at the Royal College of Art graduating in 1973.

== Career ==
=== Early work ===
Mulloy's 1982 drama film Mark Gertler: Fragments of a Biography won the British Film Institute's Grierson Award.

=== MTV Idents ===
Mulloy created many of MTV's iconic idents during the 1980s and 90s. These included the much lauded Boxers to Lovers in which two boxers, depicted as crude stick figures, stop fighting and embrace one another, only to find themselves engulfed by the furious crowd of spectators baying for blood.

=== Cowboys ===
Mulloy produced the Cowboys series in 1991 with funding from Channel 4 and the Arts Council. The series consists of six 3-minute-long films on 35 mm: Slim Pickin's, That's Nothin', Murder!, High Noon, The Conformist, and Outrage. The shorts brought Mulloy to the attention of audiences in the UK and internationally.

Mulloy exploits many of the clichés of the Western genre, minimalist Saguaro cactus dotted wilderness, stock characters like the Stetson wearing semi-nomadic wanderer, horses, lynchings and so forth drawn using brush and black ink in an intentionally primitive, silhouetted style to portray male violence, greed and rivalry using absurd black comedy.

Mulloy, commenting on his creative approach said:

“The audience is familiar with genres and clichés, and I take advantage of that fact. The viewers soon discover their position in the usual scheme of things, and become conscious of their role.”

Music for the films was provided by Alexander Bălănescu and Keith Tippett.

=== The Ten Commandments ===
Mulloy created The Ten Commandments series between 1994 and 1996. The series consists of ten short 35 mm films based on each of the ten commandments of Judeo-Christian tradition: Thou Shalt Not Adore False Gods, Thou Shalt Not Commit Blasphemy, Remember to Keep Holy the Sabbath Day, Honour Thy Father and Thy Mother, Thou Shalt Not Kill, Thou Shalt Not Commit Adultery, Thou Shalt Not Steal, Thou Shalt Not Bear False Witness, Thou Shalt Not Covet Thy Neighbours Goods and Thou Shalt Not Covet Thy Neighbours Wife.

The animations, created using brush and black ink on white paper in Mulloy's characteristic satirical grotesque style, employ black humour throughout.

Mulloy, commenting on the series in 2006, said:

"I had a structure I could work within and a set of ideas I could reinterpret for myself. Similarly reworking and playing with narrative structures creates ways of reinterpreting elements to do with my own thinking about and experiencing of the world.”

The series won the Jury Award in Vila do Conde and a Special Award in Hiroshima.

=== The Chain ===
The Chain was produced in 1998 for Channel Four and was one of 30 animated short films by 30 internationally acclaimed animators who participated in the '30/30' Human Rights Animation Project to highlight the 30 articles of the Universal Declaration of Human Rights. The title of this dark satire refers to the catastrophic chain reaction that follows the cruel treatment of a child whose drawing is thrown away. The 10-minute-long 35 mm film won the Jury Award at the Vila do Conde International Short Film Festival and the Critics Award at the World Festival of Animated Films in Zagreb.

=== Season's Greetings ===
Mulloy created Season's Greetings in 1999 for Animate Projects with funding from Channel Four and the Arts Council. The three-minute film mixes live-action and animation to produce "A greetings card for the new millennium".

=== The Christies ===
Mulloy created The Christies series in 2006 for Spectre Films. The series consists of twelve short films: Introduction, Family Values, The Language of Love, Tracey's Dream, The House Painter, A Song For Buster, The Confession, Natural Disaster, Mr. Yakamoto, Gary Challenger, Mr. Christie's Sex Manual, and The Day The Earth Moved.

Mulloy produced the animated films on computer using the Buahaus Mirage 1.5 package.

The series won the Mercury Filmworks Prize For Animated Feature in Ottawa, 2006.

=== Later work ===
At the time of his death, Mulloy was working on a trilogy based on the Christie family. Part 1, Goodbye Mister Christie, was completed in 2011. Part 2, Dead but not Buried, was completed in summer 2012 and won first prize at the Ottawa Animation festival. In 2013 he released Part 3, The Pain and The Pity. His short film Endgame won Grand Prix for the best short at the 2016 edition of World Festival of Animated Film - Animafest Zagreb.

== Personal life and death ==
Mulloy was married to Czech filmmaker and animator Vera Neubauer, and their children are director and screenwriter Daniel Mulloy and the Student Academy Award-nominated director Lucy Mulloy.

Vera Neubauer announced that Phil Mulloy had died on 10 July 2025, via social media. He was 76.
