= Stephen Partridge =

English artist

Stephen Partridge (aka Steve Partridge)
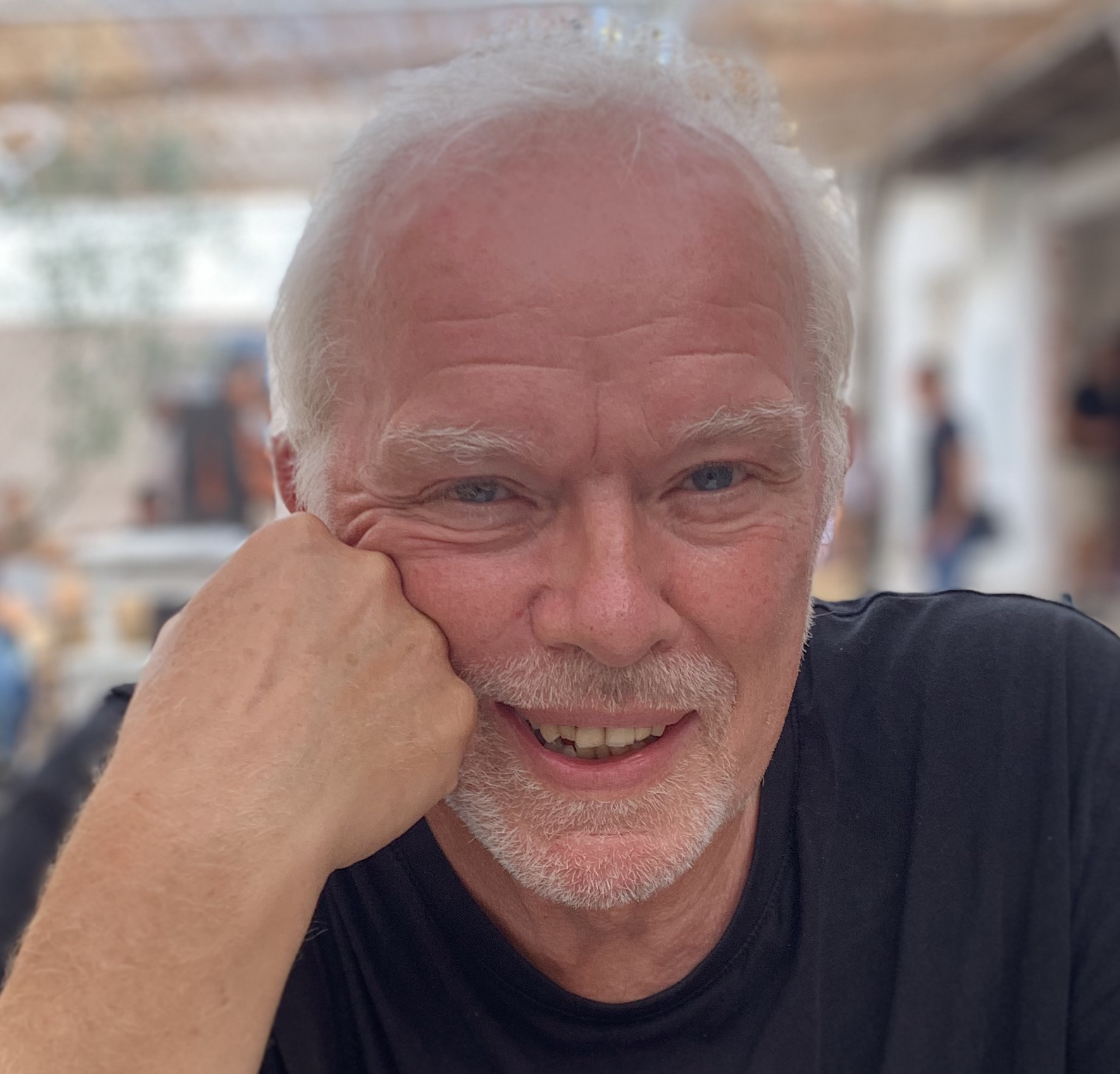
- Born: March 19, 1953 (age 73); Leicester, England
- Education: Maidstone College of Art, Royal College of Art, London
- Known for: Video art, Photography
- Notable work: Monitor (1974); Quattro Minuti di Mezzogiorno (2010)
- Movement: Video Art
- Awards: Adobe Digital Award, 1998

Stephen Partridge (born 1953) is an English video artist who studied under David Hall and his career as an artist, academic and researcher, helped to establish video as an art form in the UK.

== Life and work ==
Stephen Partridge attended Maidstone College of Art and the Royal College of Art. He was in the "landmark" video shows of the 1970s including "The Video Show" at the Serpentine in 1975, the "Video Show" at the Tate Gallery London in 1976 (where he exhibited the installation "8x8x8"), the Paris Biennalle in 1977 and The Kitchen in New York in 1979. During the eighties he exhibited widely and also became interested in works for broadcast television and was commissioned by Channel 4 television to produce "Dialogue for Two Players" in 1984, and "The Sounds of These Words", again for Channel 4 in 1989. The latter work was one of 19 productions for Channel 4 produced by his production company Fields and Frames Productions, under the series title TV Interventions which were designed to intervene in the broadcast schedule. Other commissioned artists included David Hall, Bruce McLean, David Cunningham, Ian Breakwell

In 1976 he co founded London Video Arts in collaboration with David Critchley, Stuart Marshall, David Hall, Tamara Krikorian and others. This acted as a promotional agency, an artist-led workshop and a distribution service. Hall and Partridge left the steering group of LVA in 1979.

He was an academic researcher at Duncan of Jordanstone College of Art and Design (DJCAD), University of Dundee and its Dean of Research until 2019, and his major research projects include REWIND| Artists’ Video in the 70s & 80s and REWIND Italia: Italian Video art in the 1970s & 1980s. In 1984 he established The Television Workshop at DJCAD to support artists and filmmakers' production and access to high-level broadcast technology including the Quantel Paintbox. Over 400 productions were supported in this way from 1984- 1992 until desktop video pre-empted the need. Artists and filmmakers using The Television Workshop included Jeff Keen, Robert Cahen, Tamara Krikorian, Pictorial Heroes, Judith Goddard, and many others. In 2020 he was made a Professor Emeritus at the University of Plymouth, as part of the Transtechnology Research team.

Art works include a collaboration with Elaine Shemilt, "Quattro Minuti di Mezzogiorno", a HiDefinition Video installation. Exhibited in Fuoriluogo 15 - Una Regressione Motivata, Limiti Inchiusi Arte Contemporanea, Campobasso, Molise, Italy. December 2010, January 2011. The exhibition included work by Fausto Colavecchia (IT), Douglas Gordon (GB), and was curated by Deirdre MacKenna, Director of Stills - Scotland's centre for photography in Edinburgh. In 2012 he was awarded a Royal Society of Edinburgh Caledonian European Research Fellowship to study and research in Italy.

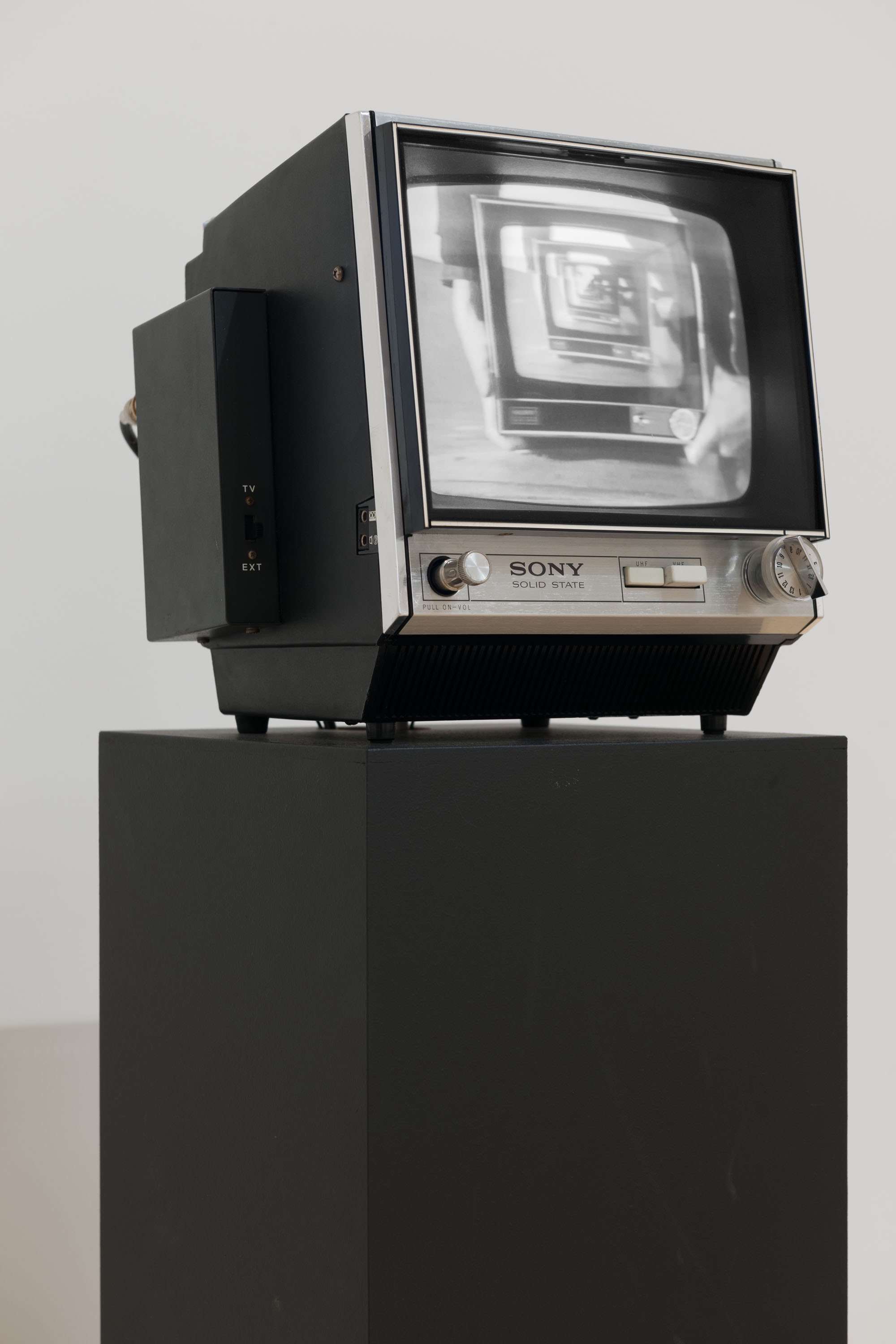
Monitor installed at Tate Britain in 2015

In November 2014, TATE London, bought his seminal work Monitor (1974) as an installation. It was selected for their 2014-17 re-hang at TATE Britain, BP Walk through British Art. The TATE exhibition label stated:

Monitor is one of the early defining works of video art in Britain, revealing the structural possibilities the medium offered to artists. For Partridge it is a pure exploration of its working process. A 1973 Sony monitor is recorded close up by a camera, the hardware becoming the subject of the video. The camera, linked to the monitor it is filming, creates in the monitor an infinite succession of repeated images of itself. The artist’s hands are seen to turn the monitor to the right through 90 degrees, challenging the physical restrictions of the monitor by becoming physically involved with repositioning it.

== Writings by Stephen Partridge ==
- A Kick in the Eye, Book chapter in Expanded Cinema, (David Curtis, A. L. Rees, Duncan White, and Steven Ball, eds), Tate Publishing, 2011
- Video: Incorporeal, Incorporated, Book chapter in Experimental Film and Video, Jackie Hatfield, Editor. (John Libbey Publishing, 2006; distributed in North America by Indiana University Press)
- A Small Survey of Early Works. Book chapter in Retrospektiv-Film-org videokunst| Norge 1960-90. Edited by Farhad Kalantary & Linn Lervik. Atopia Stiftelse, Oslo, (April 2011).
- REWIND: British Artists' Video in the 1970s & 1980s, (Sean Cubitt, and Stephen Partridge, eds), John Libbey Publishing, 2012.
- REWIND | Italia, Early Video Art in Italy: I primi anni della videoarte in Italia. Leuzzi, L. (ed.) & Partridge, S. (ed.) 2016 New Barnet: John Libbey Publishing. 352 p.
- EWVA European Women’s Video Art in the 70s and 80s, Leuzzi, L., Shemilt, E., Partridge, S. (eds.) 2019, John Libbey Publishing New Barnet. 262 p. http://www.iupress.indiana.edu/product_info.php?cPath=1037_5888&products_id=809486
- Shemilt, E, (ed) Partridge, S. (ed.), Leuzzi, L. (ed.), Richard Demarco |The Italian Connection, John Libbey Publishing. December 2022.
