= Quantel Paintbox =

Computer graphics workstation

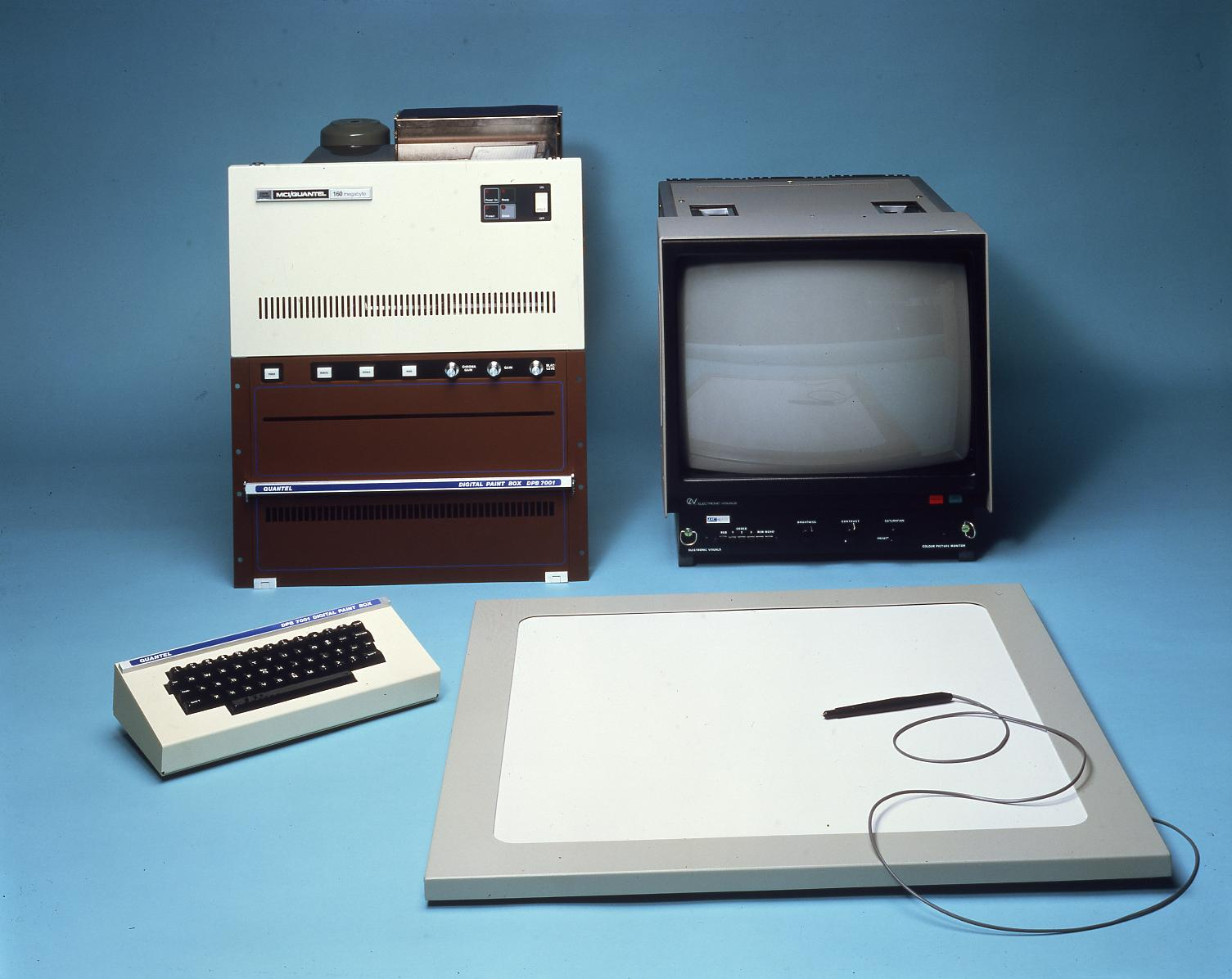
- Paintbox V logo from 1990, and Paintbox 7001
- Also known as: Paint Box
- Developer: Tony Searby, George Catlow, Roddy Pratt, Paul Kellar and RichardTaylor
- Manufacturer: Quantel
- Type: 2D graphics workstation
- Released: 1982; 44 years ago
- Introductory price: $157,800 (1982)
- Discontinued: 1989; 37 years ago
- CPU: Motorola 68000
- Predecessor: 1981 DFA7001 Paint Box prototype
- Successor: V-Series Paintbox
- Related: Quantel patented pressure-sensitive pen, tablet, Fujitsu Hard Drive, 8" Floppy Drive and RGB Monitor

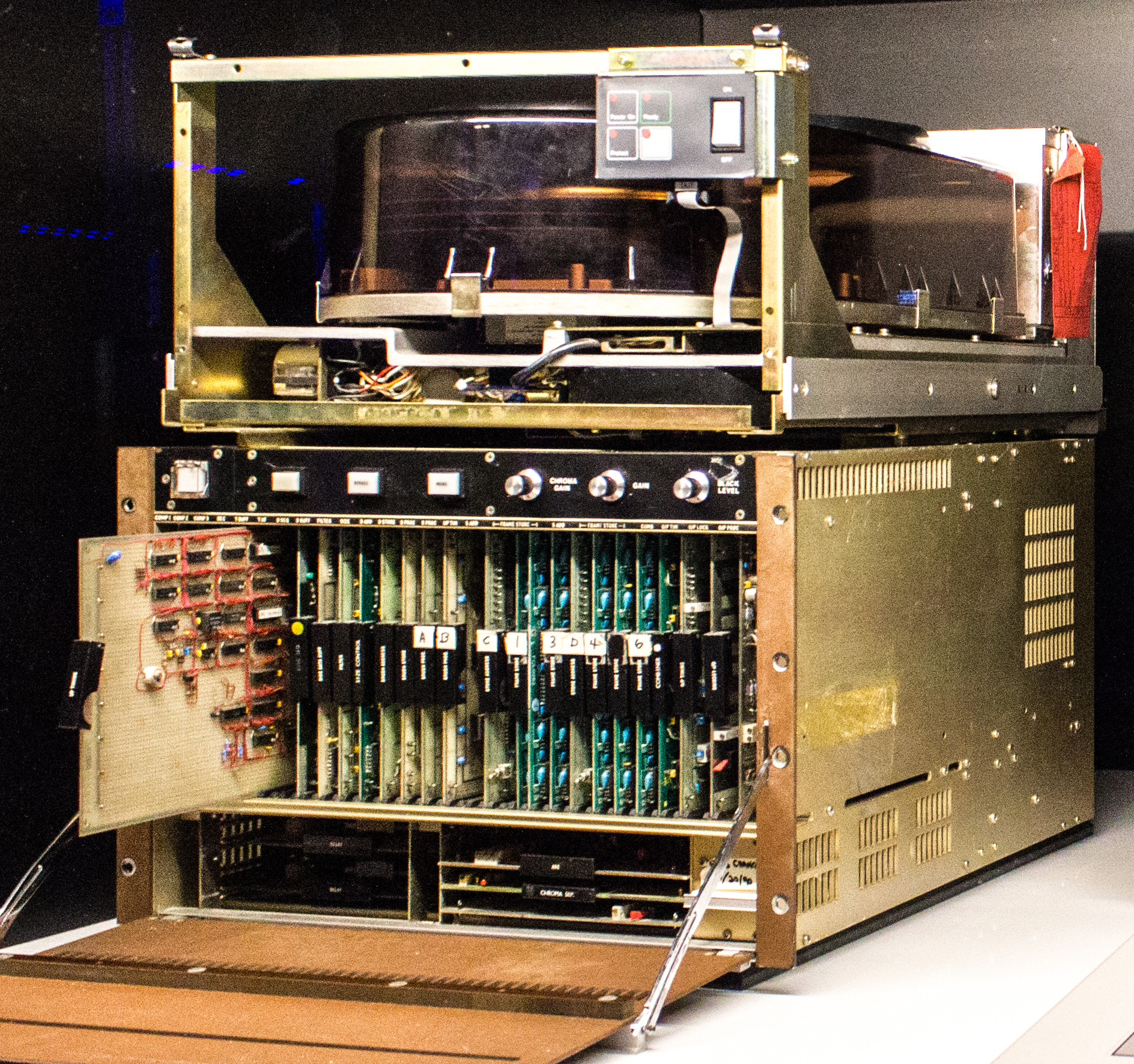
Interior view

The Quantel Paintbox is a dedicated computer graphics workstation for composition of broadcast television video and graphics. It was produced by the British production equipment manufacturer Quantel (which, via a series of mergers, became part of Grass Valley), its design emphasized the studio workflow efficiency required for live news production.

At a unit price of US$157,800 (equivalent to about $500,000 in 2025), they were used primarily by large TV networks such as NBC. In the UK, Peter Claridge's company CAL Videographics became the first commercial company to purchase one.

Following its initial launch, with a prototype in 1981 and the productionmodel at NAB in 1982, the Paintbox greatly influenced the production of television graphics.

== History ==
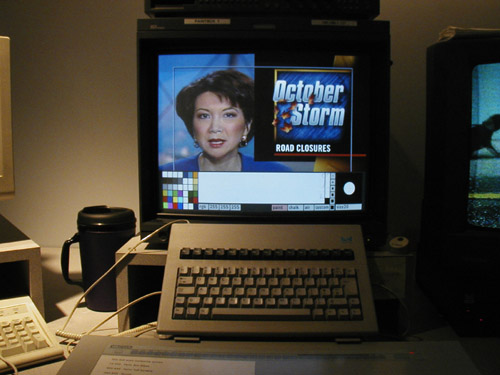
This graphical interface of Quantel Paintbox software runs on a V-series Paintbox.

Artist Martin Holbrook worked with Quantel's development team to develop the artist-oriented functionality and user interface, which remained virtually unchanged throughout the life of the product. The patented pressure-sensitive pen and tablet elevated it from a computer into a real artist's tool.

The real-time, broadcast quality, 24 bit color Quantel DFA7001 as it was then known, was revealed to potential customers in a room at the Hilton Hotel during the NAB Show in Las Vegas in April 1981. The PAL DPB-7001 and the NTSC DPB-7000 digital paint machines, with stencils and layers, were publicly launched at NAB 1982. Animation was added and hundreds of officially licensed fonts were implemented by Pepper Howard, a digital design world's first in 1983. The hardware was readily available off-the-shelf components, supported by Programmable Array Logic ICs which are custom-programmed by Quantel. Combining the latest hardware, custom software which had solved usable digital paint issues and an artist-friendly familiar way of creating artwork that required no computer knowledge, made the Paintbox an instant success. It became the global industry standard digital studio and image manipulation tool for the next fifteen years, bringing digital art and graphics onto TV screens.

The second generation V-Series Paintbox was released in 1989 as a modernized and more compact and affordable model. It has internal hardware improvements, a better tablet with a wireless pen by Wacom, upgraded keyboard, and a cordless stylus. Prices started at $80,000 (equivalent to $200,000 in 2025).

In 1985, Quantel developed a vastly increased framestore capacity, enabling them to create a high resolution print quality Paintbox, which revolutionized the photo manipulation industry five years before Photoshop was introduced and led to Quantel's high-profile lawsuit against Adobe for using the Paintbox's patented features. In the late 1980s, Quantel filed a patent infringement lawsuit against Spaceward Graphics for creating the Matisse system, which was marketed as a cheaper version of the Paintbox. It won the case against Spaceward at the High Court in London in 1990, but lost the case against Adobe in 1997, which was able to demonstrate that Richard Shoup's SuperPaint (1973) had introduced particular features before Quantel's Paintbox. Though Adobe did not yet exist when Paintbox was launched, demonstrating prior use to the court meant that Quantel's patents became invalid and the case was thrown out by the judge in Adobe's home state of Delaware.

A Paintbox unit was usually integrated into Quantel's editing systems, especially the Quantel Harry, and later Quantel's Hal, Henry, Domino and Editbox.

In contrast to the earlier DPB-7000 series machines, the V-series made extensive use of Altera CPLD and FPGA ICs, which integrated much of the complex SSI logic into a smaller number of ICs. Some versions of the V-series hardware refined the design further by moving the CPLD and FPGA logic into "hard-copy" ASICs, which were manufactured by Orbit Semiconductor.

In 2002, the generationQ series of products introduced the last stand-alone Paintbox and the QPaintbox software for PCs. Eventually, Paintbox became a feature of Quantel's other, more powerful editing, media management, and post-production products.

In 2005, Quantel updated their line of x86-based workstations (with Paintbox and Paintbox gQ models, and a software-only version of QPaintbox). They also released their new Quantel Editbox.

Though becoming the industry standard TV graphics and post production computer with hundreds sold around the world, Quantel lost all its market share against cheaper systems and software.

== Paintbox and art ==
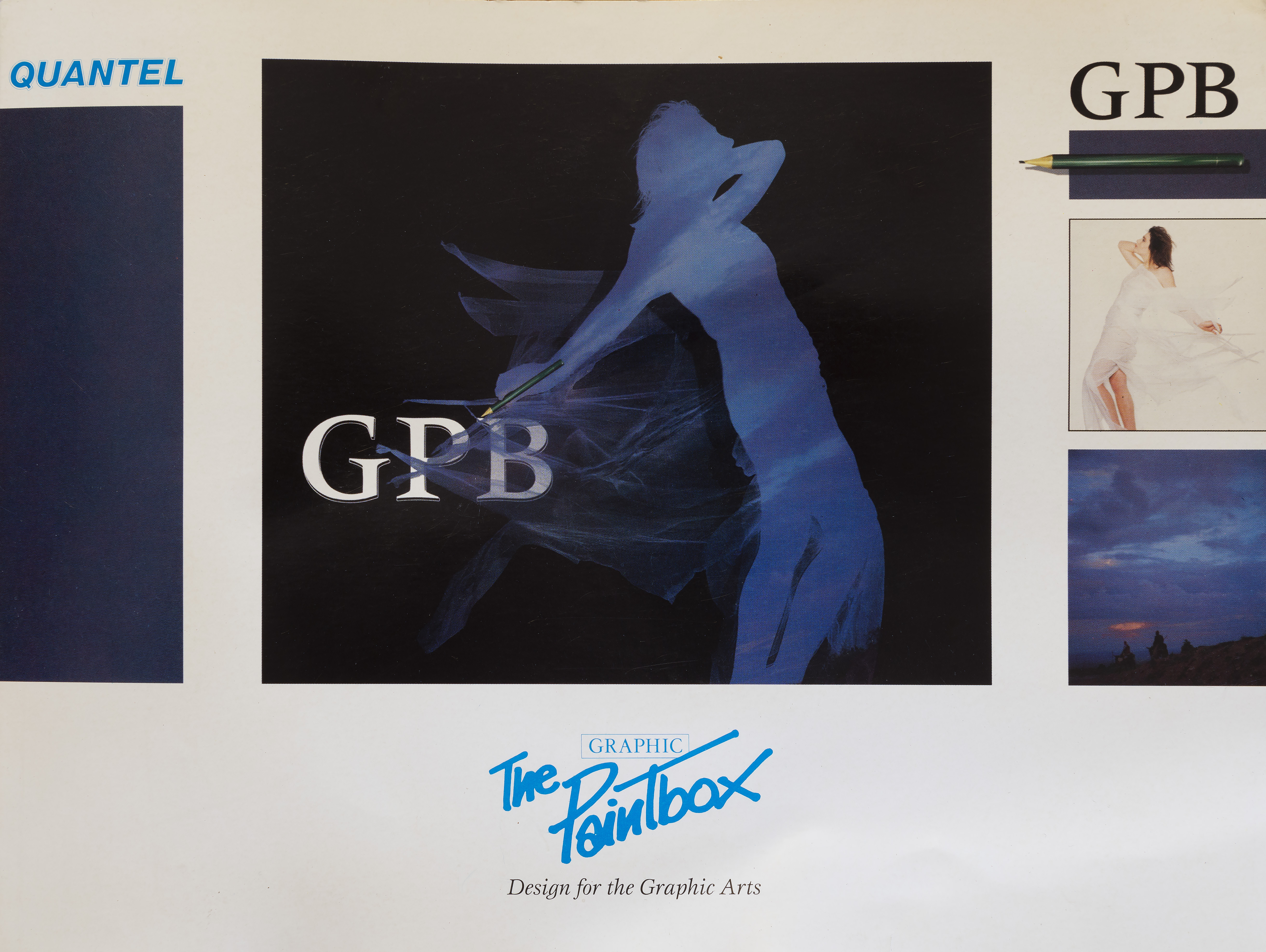
Front cover of Quantel's Graphic Paintbox brochure

Quantel invested heavily in art, employing a hundred digital artists by the late 1980s to improve and demonstrate the Paintbox features. Graphic Paintbox was used to create the posters for The Silence of the Lambs, JFK, The Doors, and record covers for Nirvana's Nevermind, and Paul's Boutique by the Beastie Boys. The artwork for The Miracle, Queen's studio album, was designed by Richard Gray and created by Richard Baker.

The first company in France to buy a Paintbox, Computer Video Film, was funded by Jack Lang at the French Ministry of Culture to create the 1985 short film Six Peintres Sur Ordinateur but it was most famously used by David Hockney, who created his first digital art on a Paintbox in June 1985, then Richard Hamilton, Howard Hodgkin, Larry Rivers, Sidney Nolan, and Jennifer Bartlett in 1986 to create original digital artwork for the groundbreaking 1987 BBC series Painting with Light.

Quantel gave three Paintbox systems to three art schools in the UK in the mid-1980s, including Blackpool College where it was used extensively by artist Adrian Wilson to create digital images, including the cover of the James album Gold Mother. Two of Wilson's Paintbox pieces were included in the pioneering Art & Computers exhibition at the Cleveland Art Gallery, England, September 1988 and he was sponsored by Quantel, who used his images for the cover of the Graphic Paintbox sales brochure. One recipient, Duncan of Jordanstone College of Art had recently appointed the video artist Stephen Partridge as a lecturer who then established (1984) The Television Workshop to support artists and filmmakers' production and access to high-level broadcast technology. Over 400 productions were supported in this way from 1984 to 1992 until desktop video pre-empted the need. Artists and filmmakers using the workshop included Richard Morrison, Jeff Keen, Robert Cahen, Tamara Krikorian, Pictorial Heroes, Judith Goddard and many others.

The music video for "Money for Nothing" by Dire Straits was created on a Bosch FGS-4000 3D animation system using a Quantel Paintbox for backgrounds and textures.

To celebrate the 50th Anniversary of Quantel in 2023, Adrian Wilson curated an exhibition of Paintbox art for the Computer Arts Society, with the exhibition and catalogue designed by Kim Mannes-Abbot, whose image appears on the front cover of the 1994 Paintboxed! book.

== See also ==
- Video Toaster
