= Jackie Hatfield =

British artist and academic (1962 - 2002)

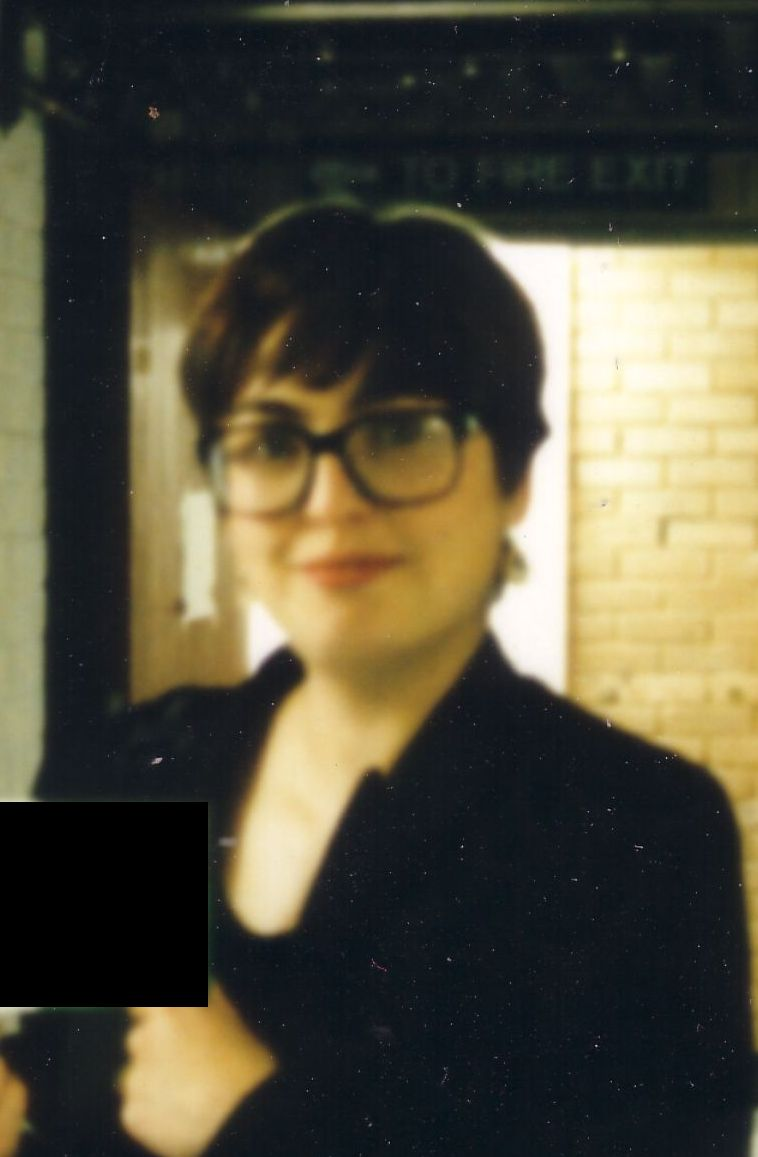
Jackie Hatfield at Kent Institute of Art & Design in about 1993.

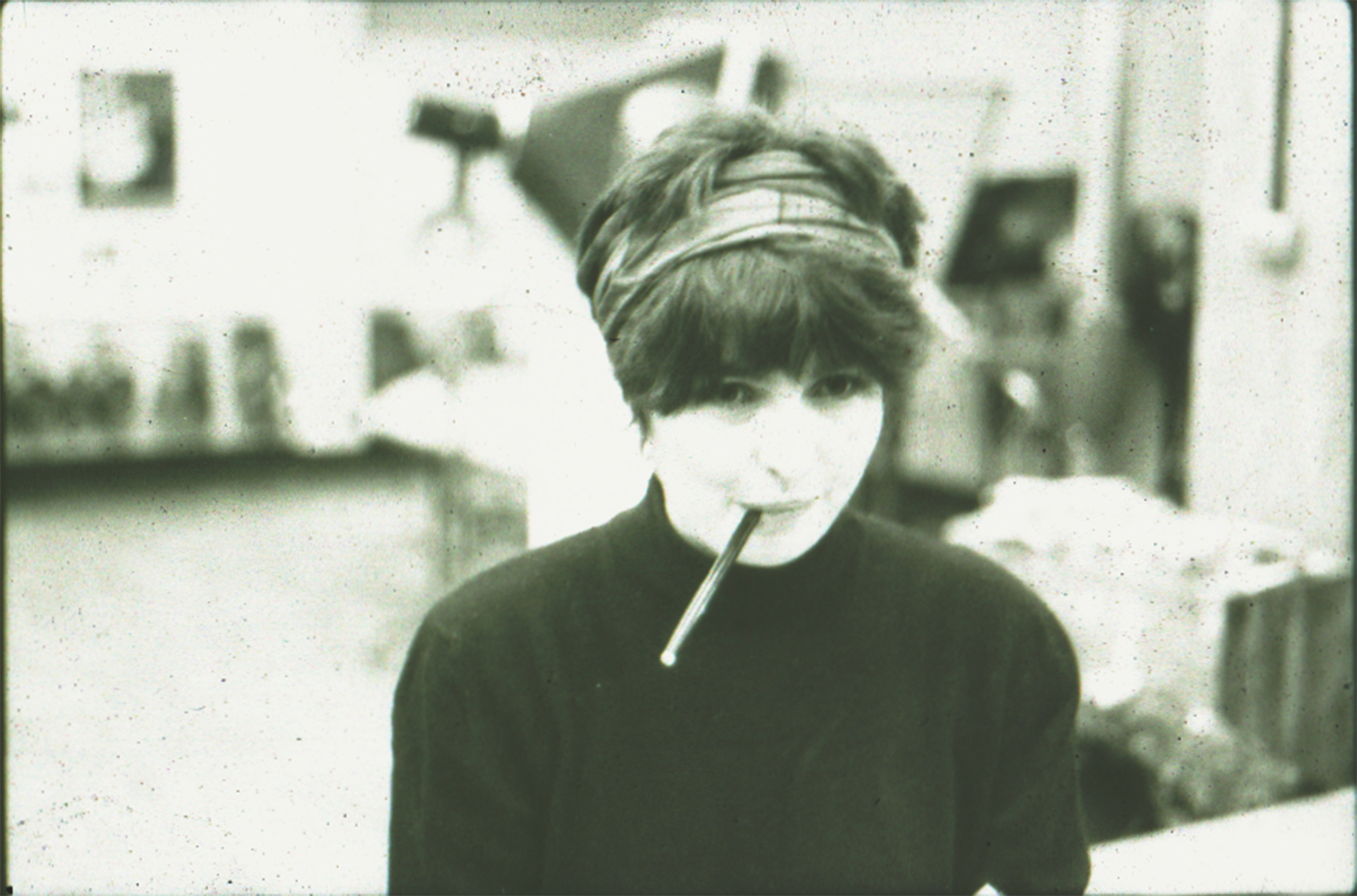

Jackie Hatfield (5 July 1962 – 2 November 2007) was an artist, writer, and academic.

== Biography ==
According to the influential artist-led no.w.here website: "Jackie Hatfield is an artist and writer who makes expanded and participatory cinematic artworks using digital video, performance, sound and digital print. She has co-edited two critical books around women's use of technology in art practice and has published essays that concentrate on under-explored histories of experimental film and video practices."

Her early career was spent making papier-mâché sculptures which enjoyed some recognition and sales before she undertook a variety of casual and sometimes unusual roles. One night, attending a London Film-Makers' Co-op screening, she decided that her future lay in the moving image. After taking advice from Dave Parsons at Central St Martins she elected to study Time Based Media at Maidstone College of Art (from 1991 to 1994), despite not being able to show much evidence of any accomplishment in either film or video. Her ambition, aspiration and intellect however, was more than enough to convince tutors A. L. Rees and Steve Littman that here was someone very special. David Hall (video artist), doyen of British video art, had established the programme in the early 1970s and his legacy and ideas on video and film as artforms were still very influential. These ideas she was later to combine with those of her PhD supervisor Malcolm Le Grice, in a 'unified' theoretical framework (unifying film and video within an expanded definition of Expanded Cinema) evidenced in her articles for Millennium Film Journal and Filmwaves.

From 1994 to 1995 she studied on the postgraduate programme in Electronic Imaging at Duncan of Jordanstone College of Art and Design where Professor Stephen Partridge was one of her tutors. After her Scottish sojourn she returned south and joined the University of Westminster in 1996, initially to take a Doctorate, but rose to Senior lecturer and Course Leader for Contemporary Media Practice, at the School of Media, Art and Design.

In 2003 Partridge invited her to discuss, and then seriously plan a research project that would investigate the ideas, aspirations, achievements of early British videoart, and select, conserve and preserve the best examples. This became REWIND| Artists' Video in the 70s & 80s, which she joined as its Research Fellow in early 2004. Before leaving Westminster she curated Experiments in Moving Image a survey of UK experimental film and video works including installations and expanded cinema, staged rather appropriately at the Old Lumiere Cinema in central London, and again 'unifying' the apparent diverse practice(s) of British film and video artists/makers. The exhibition also led to her anthology of artists' and filmmakers' writings: Experimental Film and Video Anthology, (John Libbey London, April 2006, ISBN 0-86196-664-3). This remarkable collection included the voices of 35 practitioners, many of whom had rarely if ever committed to scholarly writing before but succumbed to Jackie's persuasion and cajoling as the editor and contributor.

Jackie made many trips to New York, which became her second 'intellectual' home and favourite city, not least because of her engagement and lively debates with its artists and practitioners. She had ambitious plans for further research on both sides of the Atlantic. In 2006 she won her own large research grant from the Arts and Humanities Research Council of Great Britain, investigating 'Narrative Explorations in Expanded Cinema' which completed its work (under her spiritual guidance) through Stephen Partridge, and David Curtis and Duncan White at the British Artists' Film & Video Study Collection. The project culminated in a major publication 'Expanded Cinema: Art, Performance and Film' and the Tate Symposium: 'Activating the Space of Reception' in April 2009. .

== Writings by Jackie Hatfield ==
- Hatfield Jackie, Expanded Cinema and Narrative – Some Reasons for a Review of the Avant-Garde Debates Around Narrativity in Millennium Film Journal, HIDDEN CURRENTS, MFJ Issue Nos. 39/40 (Winter 2003), New York. Article reproduced online:
- Hatfield Jackie, Expanded Cinema – and Cinema of Attractions in Art in-sight 14 (Filmwaves 27), On Expanded Cinema, edited by Hatfield Jackie. Abstract:
- Hatfield Jackie, The Subject in Expanded Cinema, online article on Filmwaves website
- Hatfield Jackie, Expanded Cinema and its Relationship to the Avant-Garde, in Millennium Film Journal, New York, Volume: 39 (Winter), November 2003. ISSN 1064-5586, pp. 50 – 65
- Hatfield Jackie, Imagining Future Gardens of History, in Camera Obscura Feminism Culture and Media Studies, Volume: 21 (2 62), March 2006 ISSN 0270-5346, pp 184–191
- Hatfield Jackie, Experimental Film and Video: An Anthology (John Libbey Publishing, 2006; distributed in North America by Indiana University Press)
- Hatfield Jackie, Proto-, Photo and Post-Photo-Cinema in Expanded Cinema: Art, Performance and Film, A. L. Rees, David Curtis, Duncan White, Stephen Ball, Editors, (Tate Publishing, 2011)
- Hatfield Jackie, Video:Resisting Definition in REWIND: British Artists' Video in the 1970s & 1980s, (Sean Cubitt, and Stephen Partridge, eds), John Libbey Publishing, 2012.

== Key critical texts ==
- Gene Youngblood, Expanded Cinema (Dutton, 1970)
