= Club des Femmes =

Club des Femmes curate events with a focus on women's cinema and feminist and queer filmmaking in London. Founded by curator Selina Robertson and curator-filmmaker Sarah Wood, it operates as a positive female space for the re-examination of ideas through art. They held their first festival in June 2007, in conjunction with Pride London, at the Curzon Soho in London with a week-long festival, screening works by Vivienne Dick, Lizzie Borden and Sadie Benning. In 2014, Club des Femmes co-organised She Must Be Wiki, the first feminist film Wiki edit-a-thon at the ICA with the University of Kent and Wikimedia UK.

== History ==
In January 2008, Club des Femmes hosted a film programme at the ICA dedicated to Kathy Acker, including films by Bette Gordon and Jennifer Reeves, with a talk by Ali Smith, cited in There She Goes: Feminist Filmmaking and Beyond as evidence for the "due recognition being accorded to the full spectrum of women's moving image work" in the first decade of the twenty-first century.

Club des Femmes programme with a number of major institutions in London, including the ICA, BFI, London Lesbian and Gay Film Festival, Birds Eye View women's film festival, London Short Film Festival, Open City Docs, FRINGE! queer film festival and Hackney Picturehouse, and have also programmed events in Berlin. They toured the first ever presentation of Tove Jansson and Tuulikki Peitila's home movies.

They have screened work by major feminist filmmakers such as:

- Barbara Hammer
- Marina Abramović
- Jayne Parker
- Mona Hatoum
- Martha Rosler
- VALIE EXPORT
- Hito Steyerl
- Cordelia Swann
- Carol Morley
- Mia Engberg

Club des Femmes are part of Film London's National Lottery-funded Film Hub. As part of the BFI's Days of Fear and Wonder science fiction season, their weekend-long festival Women Do Science (Fiction) at the ICA in November 2014, will follow-up to their 2013 event at the Horse Hospital, Futurewoman, which featured live animation by Lisa Gornick and films by Lynn Hershman Leeson and Wanuri Kahiu.
