= KIAD =

KIAD may refer to:

- Washington Dulles International Airport, a major airport in Northern Virginia near Washington, D.C., United States
- Kent Institute of Art & Design
- KIAD (FM), a radio station (88.5 FM) licensed to Dubuque, Iowa, United States
