= Richard Morrison =

Richard Morrison may refer to:

- Richard Morrison (ambassador) (c. 1513–1556), Edward VI's ambassador to Charles V
- Richard Morrison (architect) (1767–1849), Irish architect
- Richard Morrison II, South Carolina secessionist and Planter
- Richard Morrison (film titles designer) (born 1953), English designer of film title sequences
- Richard Morrison (music critic), music critic of The Times
- Richard Morrison (Neighbours), a character from the soap opera Neighbours
- Richard James Morrison (1795–1874), English astrologer
- Richard T. Morrison (born 1967), United States Tax Court judge
