= Adrian Wilson (artist) =

British artist and photographer based in New York

Adrian Wilson (born 1964) is a British photographer based in New York.

== Biography ==
=== Early Quantel Paintbox Digital Artist ===
Wilson studied HND Design (photography) from 1984 to 1986 at Blackpool and The Fylde College, where, according to Digital Art historian Grant Taylor, he was one of the first photographers to specialize in digital image manipulation. Alvy Ray Smith believes Wilson was the first photographer who specialized in creating images using a $250,000 digital paint system known as a Quantel Paintbox which was launched nine years before Adobe Photoshop. Wilson created one of the earliest photographic memes and was included in the international "Art & Computers" exhibition at Middlesbrough Institute of Modern Art in 1988. Wilson wrote for Computer Images magazine, was a guest speaker on digital art at Camberwell College of Art and created digital art for a range of clients, most notably for Creative Review magazine and the cover of Gold Mother by recording artists James. In 1990, Wilson stopped creating digital art and put his archive into storage.

Wilson has collected a large archive of Quantel ephemera and Paintbox Artwork, including original Paintbox outputs by David Hockney, Larry Rivers, Jennifer Bartlett, Sidney Nolan and Howard Hodgkin. Wilson donated digital copies of the preslviously unseen artwork to the David Hockney Foundation and Sidney Nolan Trust, where he also lent exhibits and co-curated their Paintbox Exhibition in 2024. Wilson was commissioned by the Tate Museum to create a video of Paintbox Art, which was premiered at the Tate Modern Lates event in November 2024.

After scanning his archive, Wilson created a Quantel Paintbox website and a 3D virtual gallery, plus donated archive material to the US Computer History Museum and the UK's National Science & Media Museum. Wilson marked the 40th anniversary of the Paintbox's launch by writing an article for TVtech magazine and curating an exhibition at the British Computer Society of selections from his Paintbox artwork archive for the Computer Arts Society. On January 10, 2022, Blackpool School of Art, where Wilson first learned how to use the Quantel Paintbox, opened the first solo exhibition of his 1980's images.

Allowing a new generation of artists to create new work for free, Wilson discovered four discarded Paintboxes and has restored three to working order in his New York Studio. One of the Paintboxes is currently on loan to Blackpool School of Art, where Wilson first learned to use the Paintbox in 1985. Wilson has created new Paintbox animated idents for the Vintage Computer Federation and InfoAge Museum which can be found on his quantelpaintbox Instagram page.

=== Photography ===
Wilson specializes in photographing interiors and was the photographer for all Mondiale Publishing magazines, shooting hundreds of nightclubs between 1988 and 2000. In 2004, Wilson moved to New York, where he currently shoots for clients including LVMH The New York Times and Architectural Digest.

=== Galleries and art installations ===
Adrian Wilson salvaged a large collection of art from Manchester's textile warehouses in the 1980s, part of which is now displayed in the Science & Industry Museum in Manchester and the Museum of Art and Photography in Bangalore.

Wilson has given various talks on the collection, including at Typecon and as an expert on the Antiques Roadshow when it visited Manchester. In 2015, Wilson created "The Inutilious Retailer", an interactive art exhibit which was open for 10 months on Ludlow Street, NYC and won a Store of the Year award.

In 2018, Wilson created the "Space X Gallery" which he hid above a fake Boring Company start-up office in a derelict building on the Lower East Side, a one-man "Introspective" show about Jerry Saltz and a Native American art exhibition titled "Artonement".

Wilson opened the first gallery in Jean Michel Basquiat's last studio and home at 57 Great Jones Street, NY and named it The "Same Old Gallery"

=== Art ===
Wilson is mostly known for his street art, specifically his makeover of NYC street and subway signs to honor icons such as David Bowie, Prince. Eddie Van Halen, Aretha Franklin, which the MTA made into a permanent tribute. Wilson never signs his work and only admitted the works were his following his attainment of U.S. citizenship in 2020.

Following the $450 million sale of the much restored Salvator Mundi and an $800,000 complete set of Supreme skateboard decks, Wilson created the "Supreme Mundi", which in 2019 sold as the world's most expensive skateboard.

In response to COVID-19, Wilson created several pandemic-related pieces (now in permanent collections at the Royal College of Art and V&A Museum) and collaborated with Heidi Hankaniemi to create a "Hazmask suit and dress" to promote mask wearing which went viral.

In 2021, Wilson purchased one of the last 5 remaining Quantel Paintboxes in North America and restored it to working order.
