= David Shaw =

David, Dave, Davey, or Davie Shaw may refer to:

== Sportsmen ==
- Davie Shaw (1917–1977), Scottish footballer for Scotland national football team and Hibernian F.C.
- David Shaw (Australian footballer) (born 1938), Essendon premiership player and club president
- David Shaw (footballer, born 1948), English striker
- David Shaw (Canadian football) (1953–2024), defensive back
- David Shaw (ice hockey) (born 1964), Canadian defenceman
- David Shaw (cricketer) (born 1967), English right-handed batsman and medium pace bowler
- David Shaw (American football) (born 1972), wide receiver and former Stanford Cardinal head coach
- Davey Shaw, American motorcycle racer at 2013 AMA National Speedway Championship

== Others ==
- David Shaw (minister) (1719–1810), Scottish minister
- David Shaw (writer) (1943–2005), American journalist for Los Angeles Times
- David Shaw (British politician) (1950–2022), British Conservative MP for Dover
- David E. Shaw (born 1951), American businessman and scientist; founder of D. E. Shaw & Co.
- David Shaw (painter) (1952–1989), English print-maker, lecturer and drawing tutor
- Dave Shaw (1954–2005), Australian scuba diver
- David Shaw (British Army officer) (born 1957), British general
- Dave Shaw, host of 2002 Canadian TV series Condensed Classics with Dave Shaw
- David Shaw, American frontman since 2007 for rock band The Revivalists

== See also ==
- The Runaway Summer of Davie Shaw
