= Jasper White =

Jasper White may refer to:

- Jasper White (chef) (1954–2024), American chef, restaurateur and author
- Jasper White (photographer) (born 1973), British photographer
