= Muriel Wood =

Canadian artist

Muriel Wood is a Canadian artist.

== Biography ==
After graduating from the Canterbury College of Art, she began illustrating children's books. She taught illustration at the Ontario College of Art for ten years. Among the books she has illustrated are The Olden Days Coat by Margaret Laurence, Anne of Green Gables by L.M. Montgomery, Old Bird by Irene Morck, Lizzie's Storm by Sally Fitz-Gibbon, Scared Sarah by Mary Alice Downie, and Aram's Choice and Call Me Aram by Marsha Forchuk Skrypuch. Her illustrations have also appeared on Canadian postage stamps. She lives with her husband, illustrator, graphic artist and designer David Chestnutt, in Toronto, Ontario.
