= London Video Arts =

London Video Arts (LVA) was founded for the promotion, distribution and exhibition of video art.

== Art form ==
By 1976 video art had emerged as a viable time-based art form, which was beginning to establish its own aesthetic identity and theoretical discourse distinct from film.

Following the influential Video Show at the Serpentine Gallery in May 1975, which brought the work of international video artists to London and showcased British artists working in the medium, it became apparent that the increased activity in British video art required an organisation to provide support for the artists involved. The idea for London Video Arts (LVA) was initiated by David Hall and founded in summer 1976 by a group of video artists including Roger Barnard, David Critchley, Tamara Krikorian, Brian Hoey, Pete Livingstone, Stuart Marshall, Stephen Partridge, John Turpie and Hall.

== London Video Arts ==
LVA aimed to provide video artists with support promoting their work, beginning as Stuart Marshall later put it as "a pressure group" for the autonomy of video as an art practice, with its own systems of exhibition and distribution. This is apparent in the first LVA catalogue, produced in 1978, which places emphasis on "artists′ work on videotape, video performance and video installations…". LVA acted as a regular screening venue for video art with a distribution library that provided access to a selection of tapes by international as well as British artists working in the field. In the early days there were no production facilities, due in part to the unwieldy and expensive nature of the technology then available. It was not until the early 1980s that LVA managed to secure sufficient funding to set up a permanent office, employ staff and set up their first production facility, this was heralded in LVA's second 1984 catalogue by David Critchley. "We now have, in March 1984, an organisation which is ‘up and running’ in all of the areas it was intended to cover by its founder members back in 1976...LVA can now offer facilities for the production and post-production of video programmes, can exhibit those programmes through its own shows series, and can distribute them worldwide with the help of this catalogue."

As video art became more established throughout the 1980s LVA changed to accommodate the different concerns which emerged across the decade. The phenomenon of Scratch video, for example, and the rise of the music video and cheaper and more available video "camcorder" technology produced a different aesthetic less connected to the modernist concern for medium specificity which first characterised video. In 1988, after some disagreements with John Cleese’s video production company (Video Arts) over company names, LVA became London Video Access, and indeed its production facilities were in great demand at the expense of its distribution library during this period, showing a shift towards broadcast and the independent video sector and away from the arts. By 1994 another change of title to London Electronic Arts reflected developments in video technology towards a more dispersed digital media and again reasserted the artist led nature of the organisation. A further move to Lottery funded premises at the Lux Centre in 1996 also provided a purpose built gallery space to accompany distribution and production facilities. Under the pressure of funding cuts, and perhaps also determined by the increasingly blurred distinctions which now existed between video and other moving image media, LEA merged with the London Film-Makers' Co-op with whom it shared a venue under the collective name of the Lux Centre, continuing until the eventual demise of the Centre in 2001. Its extensive library of video tapes, attesting to the rich history of British and international video art which LVA first helped to promote, continues to find distribution through LUX, as do many of the artists originally involved.

== See also ==
- LUX (UK film company)
