= Abhishek Poddar =

Indian industrialist, philanthropist and art collector

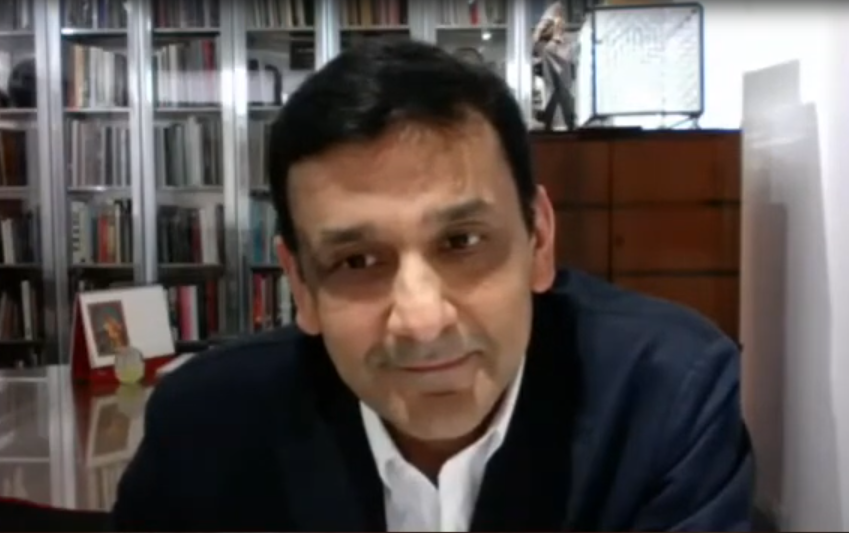
- Born: Calcutta
- Education: St. Xavier's College, Calcutta

Abishek Poddar (born 1968) is an Indian industrialist, philanthropist and art collector. Poddar has served on the advisory committees of the National Gallery of Modern Art (NGMA), Bengaluru and is currently on the advisory panel of the Foundation Inde-Europe de Nouveaux Dialogues (FIND) or the India-Europe Foundation for New Dialogues, headquartered in Rome, Trustee of the Art & Photography Foundation, Bengaluru and on the Board of the Museum of Art & Photography, Bengaluru. He is also the former Honorary Consul for Poland in Bengaluru. He is also the director of Sua Explosives & Accessories, and the managing director of Matheson Bosanquet.

== Personal life and education ==
Poddar was born in Calcutta (Kolkata) as the son of industrialist Bimal Poddar. He attended the all-boys' boarding school, The Doon School in Dehradun, and then went to St. Xavier's College, Calcutta. Poddar is married to Radhika Sanghi, founder of the design and lifestyle store Cinnamon. They have two children and live in Bengaluru.

== Career ==
Poddar worked initially at Khaitan & Co., and later at the Standard Chartered Bank before joining the family businesses. In the 1970s, the Poddar family acquired Matheson Bosanquet, an 80-year-old company with activities in tea production, trading and export, and shipping. Poddar joined the company in the late 1980s and took over as Managing Director in 1997. He also became Managing Director of the Poddar family's company, Sua Explosives & Accessories Private Limited, which manufactures and supplies mining explosives and accessories in India, catering to both the domestic and international market. Other companies he owns range from trading and export to the retail sector.

== Museum of Art & Photography (MAP) ==
Poddar serves as the Founder-Trustee at the Museum of Art & Photography, a unit of the Art & Photography Foundation. MAP is a Bangalore-based museum set to open in 2020. With his family, Poddar invested

$7 million and 7,000 pieces from their personal collection to the Museum of Art & Photography in Bangalore. As the first major private art museum in India's tech city, it already has more than 18,000 works covering the gamut from modern and contemporary Indian art to photography and popular culture.[6]

== Patronage and philanthropy ==
As an active art collector since the early 1980s, Poddar created a significant collection of South Asian art, craft and antiquities, including modern and contemporary art which according to the auction house Christie's is one of the world's most important collections on the sub-continent. In 2018, Poddar donated the majority of the family collection to the Museum of Art & Photography, Bengaluru, a project of which the family are also patrons. He was named as one of Asia's Heroes Of Philanthropy by Forbes Magazine in 2018.
