= Lasse Gjertsen =

Norwegian animator and videographer

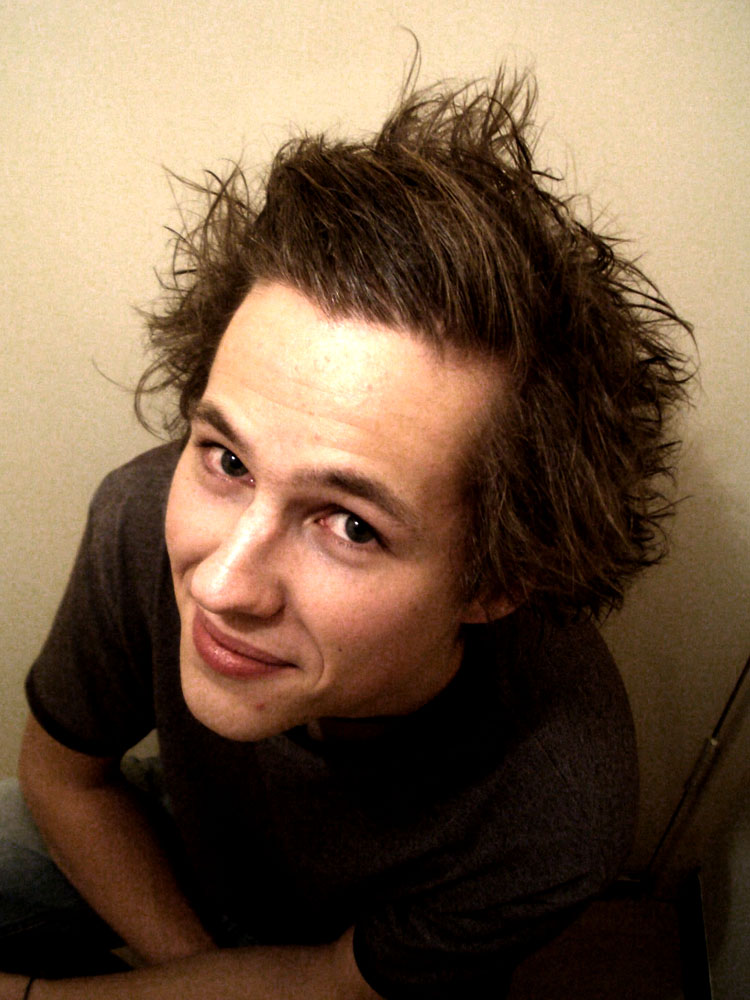
- Gjertsen in 2005
- Born: 19 July 1984 (age 42); Larvik, Norway
- Occupations: Animator, musician, and videographer
- Years active: 2005–present
- Known for: "Hyperactive" and "Amateur" videos on YouTube

Lasse Gjertsen (born 19 July 1984) is a Norwegian animator, musician, and videographer. He is best known for his short pieces "Hyperactive" and "Amateur", big hits in the early years of YouTube, which strung together short clips of video to create a unique form of video akin to stop-motion animation. His "Hyperactive" video has over 9.2 million views and his "Amateur" video has over 16 million views.

== Biography ==
Gjertsen was born in Larvik, Norway. He studied animation at Kent Institute of Art & Design in England, and at Volda University College in Norway. His time at Kent Institute ended with his teachers failing to appreciate his work, specifically Hyperactive.

== YouTube ==
Lasse originally submitted Hyperactive to YouTube after seeing a copy uploaded by another user with poor sound quality. Over the next six months Lasse uploaded 16 more videos, many created during his animation course. He has had several videos featured on the YouTube front page, including Hyperactive, What The Fuck?, Amateur, and Sogno ad Occhi Aperti. While Hyperactive has been the most popular, Amateur was featured in an article in the online edition of the Wall Street Journal.

Another video by Gjertsen has also been featured on YouTube; "Hva faen, Speil?" in which he is looking into a mirror while some of the effects of hallucinogenic mushrooms become apparent through video and audio editing.

Lasse Gjertsen's video Hyperactive was nominated in the category Most Creative video in YouTube's 2006 Video Awards. The video achieved third place.

Hyperactive was copied by Cartoon Network in an advert for the show Foster's Home for Imaginary Friends. Lasse initially considered legal action but after talking to a lawyer decided it would be too arduous.

It was also spoofed in an advertisement for the 3rd season of the FX TV show It's Always Sunny In Philadelphia. Whether this was done with or without Gjertsen's permission is unclear.

Lasse Gjertsen is also the creator of the soundtrack of the Chaplin Snakker videos on YouTube. Chaplin Snakker is one of his electronic songs, in which the freedom- and awe-inspiring speech of Charlie Chaplin from his movie The Great Dictator (1940) is elevated by the use of music.

Gjertsen also created a parody of Fireman Sam, dubbing his voice over Thief in Pontypandy.

== Beyond YouTube ==
The YouTube success has resulted in offers from international companies like Chevrolet and MTV. However, Gjertsen publicly denounces the concept of advertising, considering it below prostitution, and has refused all such offers.

In addition to his video work, Lasse has a self-produced album of electronica music.

In 2007 Lasse worked on a two-part music video collaboration, named Sogno ad Occhi Aperti, with the Italian Cellist Giovanni Sollima. This was presented at the 8th International Fringe Film Festival in Marzamemi, Italy. In the same year he directed the music video for the Swedish rapper Timbuktu's song "Get Fizzy". From 2019, Gjertsen has been working with VFX and voice on the children's show "Minibarna" for the Norwegian broadcaster NRK. Together with colleagues he received the award "Gullruten" for best VFX in may 2021.

== Software ==
Lasse has stated he uses the following software in the creation of his videos:

- Adobe Photoshop
- Adobe Premiere Pro
- Adobe After Effects
- Debugmode WinMorph
- FL Studio

=== Music ===
Lasse uses FL Studio to create original compositions in his videos. Although he claims not to have much skill with instruments, he has sampled himself playing drums, piano, guitar, harmonica, and singing.

The only videos without original compositions are the two music videos, Home Sweet Home by Norwegian Rapper Sirius, and Sogno ad Occhi Aperti by Italian Cellist Giovanni Sollima.

== YouTube video chronology ==
=== 2006 ===
Title	Release date	Length	Notes
1. "Hyperactive - Lasse Gjertsen"	May 8	2:06	Viewed 7,910,459 times by itself (the same video uploaded by user champaR has 14,366,600 views)
2. "Machine Man - Lasse Gjertsen"	May 9	1:43	692,121 views
3. "The Businessman - Lasse Gjertsen"	May 10	2:09	151,051 views
4. "Us - Lasse Gjertsen"	May 10	1:21	588,542 views
5. "Commercial (Norwegian) - Lasse Gjertsen"	May 21	0:40	1,691,834 views
6. "Lasse vs Teknologi - Lasse Gjertsen"	July 28	0:42	731,135 views
7. "Ghost or something?! Watch the left hand top corner.."	July 30	0:32	890,616 views
8. "Hva faen, Speil? - Lasse Gjertsen"	August 25	1:02	1,777,184 views, featured on YouTubes front page
9. "Lasse vs Teknologi II - Lasse Gjertsen"	October 29	2:13	966,164 views
10. "Rødmaling - Lasse Gjertsen"	October 30	1:13	2,285,192 views, making it his most popular animation
11. "Sirius - Home sweet home"	October 31	3:35	156,667 views, Music Video
12. "Jeg går en Tur - A self portrait by Lasse Gjertsen"	November 1	3:14	1,020,749 views, Submitted as an entrance exam for animation school in Norway
13. "Hvordan passere en veibane - Lasse Gjertsen"	November 1	0:27	336,560 views
14. "Fotball NM '97 - Lasse Gjertsen"	November 1	4:08	1,727,088 views
15. "Den Lille Valpen - Lasse Gjertsen"	November 2	1:21	408,594 views
16. "Amateur - Lasse Gjertsen"	November 7	3:12	The most viewed video on his account, with 14,841,726 views on YouTube as of 18 March 2015.

=== 2007 ===
Title	Release date	Length	Notes
17. "Sweet Memories - Stine Mills"	January 31	1:33	Video directed by his ex-girlfriend, for which Lasse did the technical work.
18. "Giovanni Sollima - Sogno ad Occhi Aperti (Daydream) PART 1"	May 9	6:20	Video for Terra Aria
19. "Giovanni Sollima - Sogno ad Occhi Aperti (Daydream) PART 2"	May 9	5:53	Video for Concerto Rotondo

=== 2008 ===
Title	Release date	Length	Notes
20. "Det Ultimate Selvmord"	January 24	6:03	English Title "The Ultimate Suicide" Lasse had his profile temporarily deleted after uploading the video, and was asked to add a disclaimer when his account was re-instated. It was thought to be real, but it was heavily edited yet still realistic.
21. "Faen!"	February 7	2:20	Spoken in English
22. "New 9/11 Footage clearly showing fake planes!"	April 29	2:09	
23. "Roshambo"	June 25	1:00	Animation

=== 2009 ===
Title	Release date	Length	Notes
24. "Gammelt Nytt"	April 24	5:35	Animation
24. "Katzenjammer - A Bar in Amsterdam (Official music video by Lasse Gjertsen)"	December 15	3:13	Music video for the Norwegian band Katzenjammer

=== 2010 ===
Title	Release date	Length	Notes
24. "Consoul (Lasse Gjertsen 2009)"	August 12	12:13	

== See also ==
- YouTube celebrities
