= Gordon Frickers =

British painter (born 1949)

Gordon Frickers (born 1949 in Beckenham, Kent, United Kingdom) is a marine artist based in Plymouth, Devon, but also paints in France. Frickers was the first marine artist to be exhibited at the European Parliament in Brussels in May 2011.

== Education and experience ==
- Maidstone College of Fine Art (later part of Kent Institute of Art & Design and now part of University for the Creative Arts) and Medway College : Visual Communication, Photography for advertising & media
- Falmouth Technical College : Ship & Boat Building;
- Montmiral School of Painting (South West France)
- Plymouth College of Further Education (now City College Plymouth) : Internet, E business, web design

In addition to being an artist, Frickers is also a master shipwright and marine and art historian. At one time he was managing director of Southeast Boat Building.

== Awards and memberships ==
- Four times chosen Yachting World/Rolex-Swan prize artist
- Member of the British Marine Federation
- Member of SuperyachtUK

== Works ==
Works and series by Frickers include:

- "I have urgent dispatches" which depicts the schooner HMS Pickle conveying news of the death of Nelson and victory at Trafalgar
- "Trafalgar Dawn", the view from HMS Victory at 6:05 am on the morning of 21 October 1805
- "Trafalgar Dawn, the French Perspective" showing the view Vice-Admiral Villeneuve had from his flagship Bucentaure just before the battle
- 1994 "Nexus", the Cable Ship Nexus commissioned by BT Marine and donated to Coe Metcalf Shipping of Liverpool, who had converted the oil drilling ship Pelican 2 to become CS Nexus
- 1991 "Cable Ship Sovereign" commissioned by BT Marine for their boardroom
- "The Port of Chester"
- "Royal Yacht Britannia (1893)"
- "Uganda entering Falmouth with tugs to lay up after the Falklands war"
- "Dumra departing Bombay in a rising S.W. monsoon", for Sir Robin Knox-Johnston to celebrate Sir Robin's earliest times at sea
- "Cunard Express Steamer The Mauretania"
- "Plymouth Cattewater", which shows a clipper loading in the early 1880s before her imminent departure for Australia
- "HMS Formidable, Seafires Returning", painted for a lady whose husband had served as a pilot
- "Norway", the cruise ship, leaving Miami
- The voyage of the French explorer Lapérouse series
- Historic & Picturesque Wine Villages of Bordeaux series

Some of Frickers work has been reproduced as limited edition prints

== Patrons ==
Frickers patrons and clients include:

- The Sail Training Association (now the Tall Ships Youth Trust)
- Caledonian MacBrayne
- British Telecom (Marine) Ltd.
- Cunard Line
- Yamaha
- Sir Robin Knox-Johnston
- Maiden G.B. (Tracy Edwards)
- Blue Arrow America's Cup
- The National Trust
- Imperial Tobacco (Award won)
- Devonport Management Limited
- Marine Projects (now known as Princess Yachts)
- Coe Metcalf Shipping Ltd.
- Corum – French Admiral's Cup Sponsor
- Sir Richard Branson
- Henri Lloyd Limited
- La Maire de Sauternes
- CPC (United Kingdom) Limited (name changed in 1998 to Best Foods Inc)

== Exhibitions and galleries ==
Frickers work has been exhibited at:

- European Parliament, Brussels, May 2011
- Buckingham Palace
- London International Boat Show
- Royal Society of Marine Artists
- Maison de la Fontaine, City of Brest
- Chester Town Hall, including a Civic Reception
- La Mairie, L'ile sur Tarn, October, November 2007
- 1868 Restaurant, King David Street, Jerusalem, May 2007

Frickers' wine villages of France paintings have been exhibited at Gallerie Marin in Appledore, north Devon.

== Books and TV ==
Frickers work has appeared in:

- The Nelson Almanac edited by David Harris
- Nelson's Ships by Peter Goodwin
- Ships of Trafalgar by Peter Goodwin
- Fighting Ships 1750–1850 by Sam Willis

Frickers appeared in the 2010 TV documentary series, The Boats that Built Britain.
