= Eccles Roman Villa =

Coordinates: 51.317950°N 0.468948°E

At Eccles in Kent the remains of a huge Roman Villa with palatial dimensions were excavated between 1962 and 1976. In the second century AD, the villa was almost 112 m long. Over 135 different rooms have been identified throughout the various periods of construction and reconstruction. The villa was abandoned in the Fourth century, and much of it was removed in the Thirteenth century for the construction of Aylesford Priory.

The villa lies on the east side of the Medway Valley. Roman remains were already known from the Nineteenth century on. During the course of excavation, some human burials of Roman date were found deposited beneath the villa floors. Further finds included fragments of Roman pottery and coins. A large post-Roman cemetery was discovered adjacent to the south-east wing of the villa. There were also some remains of a pre-Roman, Iron Age settlement.

The earliest Roman villa dates from about 65 A.D. and consisted of a long row of at least 12 rooms, a porticus, and probably a second story. Five of these rooms might once have contained floors with mosaics. In front of the house was a long ornamental pool. The building was of high status, as stone buildings were otherwise not so common at this early age in Roman Britain. A huge bath house was built next to it. In several rooms, fragments of mosaics were found, most of them in a bad state of preservation. One of them most likely shows two gladiators.

The baths were damaged by fire and around A.D. 120 a new bath house and extensions to the dwelling were built, and continued in use until A.D. 180; a third and more extensive bath suite was then erected, and the house once more remodelled by the addition of a rear corridor and new tessellations, as well as a new wing with a channelled hypocaust. A final reconstruction took place after A.D. 290, when the rear corridor was converted into a suite of rooms with a hypocaust. Many rooms had tessellated floors, remains of well paintings were found.

It has been suggested that the villa was first established by Adminius.

The excavation record of the villa reported that much of the building stone was likely robbed in the Medieval period for construction elsewhere, for instance, the 12th-century St Mary's Church at Burham incorporates Roman tiles into its fabric.

The results of the excavations were published in several short reports. A final excavation report is so far not yet been published.

== Bibliography, including the preliminary excavation reports ==
- Nick Stoodley, Stephen R.Cosh The Romano-British Villa and Anglo-Saxon Cemetery at Eccles, Kent A Summary of the Excavations by Alex Detsicas With a Consideration of the Archaeological, Historical and Linguistic Context. Oxford 2021
- David S. Neal, Stephen R. Coshː Roman Mosaics of Britain, Volume III: South-East Britain, Part 2, London 2009 ISBN 978-0-85431-289-4, pp. 369–373
- Ratcliff, Andrew: What can we deduce about the ownership of Eccles Roman villa and its place in the social and economic development of the Medway valley and the civitas Cantiacorum?. (2018) MA Dissertation, University of Kent.
- Historic England: Romano-British villa, Anglo-Saxon cemetery and associated remains at Eccles, Aylesford in Heritage at Risk: London & South East Register, 176 (2019) online
- A. P. Detsicas, M.A., F.S.A. Scotː Excavations at Eccles Roman Villa, 1962: First Interim Report., inː Archaeologia Cantiana 78 (1963), 125-141 online
- A. P. Detsicas, M.A., F.S.A. Scotː Excavations at Eccles, 1963: Second Interim Report., inː Archaeologia Cantiana - Vol. 79 1964, 121 - 135 online
- A. P. Detsicas, M.A., F.S.A. Scotː Excavations at Eccles Roman Villa, 1964: Third Interim Report., inː Archaeologia Cantiana - Vol. 80 1965 pages 69– 91 online
- A. P. Detsicas, M.A., F.S.A. Scotː Excavations at Eccles Roman Villa, 1965: Fourth Interim Report., inː Archaeologia Cantiana 81 (1966), 44 - 52 online
- A. P. Detsicas, M.A., F.S.A. Scotː Excavations at Eccles Roman Villa, 1966 Fifth Interim Report., inː Archaeologia Cantiana, 82 (1967), 162-178 online
- A. P. Detsicas, M.A., F.S.A. Scotː Excavations at Eccles Roman Villa, 1967: Sixth Interim Report, Archaeologia Cantiana, 83 (1968), 39-48 online
- A. P. Detsicas, M.A., F.S.A. Scotː Excavations at Eccles Roman Villa, 1968: Seventh Interim Report, inː Archaeologia Cantiana 84 (1969), 93-107 online
- A. P. Detsicas, M.A., F.S.A. ScotːExcavations at Eccles Roman Villa, 1969: Eight Interim Report, inː Archaeologia Cantiana 85 (1970), 55- 60 online
- A. P. Detsicas, M.A., F.S.A. Scotː Excavations at Eccles Roman Villa, 1970: Ninth Interim Report, inː Archaeologia Cantiana, 86 (1971), 25-34 online
- A. P. Detsicas, M.A., F.S.A. Scotː Excavations at Eccles Roman Villa, 1971: Tenth Interim Report, inː Archaeologia Cantiana, 87 (1972), 101-110 online
- A. P. Detsicas, M.A., F.S.A. Scotː Excavations at Eccles Roman Villa, 1972: Eleventh Interim Report, inː Archaeologia Cantiana, 88 (1973), 73-80 online
- A. P. Detsicas, M.A., F.S.A. Scotː Excavations at Eccles Roman Villa, 1973: Twelfth Interim Report, inː Archaeologia Cantiana, 89 (1974), 119-134 online
- A. P. Detsicas, M.A., F.S.A. Scotː Excavations at Eccles Roman Villa, 1974: Thirteenth Interim Report, inː Archaeologia Cantiana, 91 (1975), 41-45 online
- A. P. Detsicas, M.A., F.S.A. Scotː Excavations at Eccles Roman Villa, 1975: Fourteenth Interim Report, inː Archaeologia Cantiana, 92 (1976), 157-163 online
- A. P. Detsicas, M.A., F.S.A. Scotː Excavations at Eccles Roman Villa, 1976: Final Interim Report, inː Archaeologia Cantiana, 93 (1977), 55-59 online
- A.P. Detsicas, B.A., M.A., D.Litt., F.S.A. : Excavations at Eccles: A progress report, in: Archaeologia Cantiana, 107 (1989), 83-88 online
