= LUX (British film company) =

British experimental artists' film organisation

LUX is the principal centre for the promotion and distribution of experimental film and video works in the UK.

It has one of the largest collections of experimental film and video art and houses works of approximately 1500 artists. It was formed in the 1990s in the merger of the London Film-Makers' Co-op and the original London Video Arts (later variously named London Video Access and London Electronic Arts).

LUX Scotland was established in 2014 and is based in Glasgow.

LUX Online was a project developed between 2004 and 2009 to provide a web resource for exploring British based artists' film and video in-depth.
