= David Hall (video artist) =

English artist

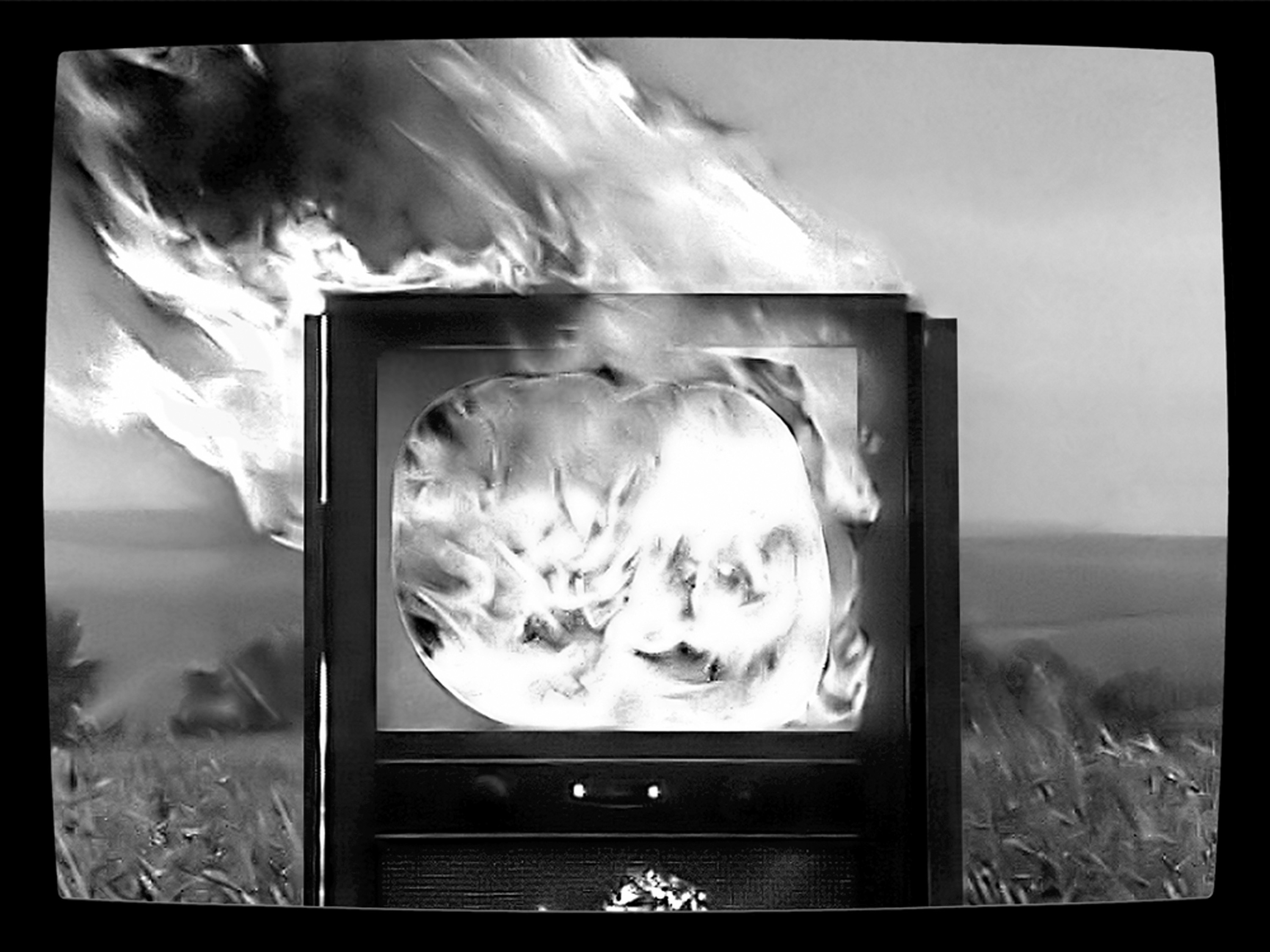
- From TV Interruptions broadcast unannounced by Scottish Television, 1971
- Born: 1937; Leicester, England
- Died: October , 2014
- Education: Leicester College of Art; Royal College of Art, London
- Notable work: Video works include: TV Interruptions (7 TV Pieces) (1971); This is a Video Monitor (1973); Progressive Recession (1974); 101 TV Sets (1972-1975); A Situation Envisaged: The Rite II (Cultural Eclipse) (1988); Stooky Bill TV (1990); 1001 TV Sets (End Piece) (1972-2012)
- Movement: Sculpture, Conceptual art, Experimental film, Video art
- Awards: Samsung Art+ Lifetime Achievement Award 2012

David Hall (born 1937 in Leicester, died October 2014) was an English artist, whose work contributed much to establishing video as an art form.

== Life and work ==
David Hall studied at Leicester College of Art and the Royal College of Art. During the 1960s he worked as a sculptor and showed his work internationally. He won first prize at the Biennale de Paris in 1965 and took part in other key shows including the seminal Primary Structures exhibition at the Jewish Museum, New York in 1966 which marked the beginning of Minimalist art.

In 1966 he was a founder of the pioneering artists' organisation Artist Placement Group, APG, along with Barbara Steveni, John Latham, Barry Flanagan, Anna Ridley, and Jeffrey Shaw among others. APG was a milestone in Conceptual Art in Britain, reinventing the means of making and disseminating art.

It was during this time he began working with film and at the beginning of the 1970s turned to video as an art medium.

His work in video and his writings in Studio International and elsewhere contributed to the establishment of this as a genre in the visual arts, and it was here he introduced the term "time based media". He was curator of early shows, and influenced emerging artists as a teacher.

In 1971 he made ten "Interruptions" broadcast intentionally unannounced and uncredited on Scottish Television. Seven of these works were later distributed on video as TV Interruptions (7 TV Pieces), and are acknowledged as the first artist interventions on British television and as an equally formative moment in British video art. The first multi-channel video installation shown in the UK was his 60 TV Sets at the exhibition A Survey of the Avant-Garde in Britain, Gallery House, London 1972, which was expanded as 101 TV Sets at The Video Show, Serpentine Gallery, London 1975 (both made in collaboration with the film artist Tony Sinden).

In 1972 he founded the audio visual workshop at Maidstone College of Art. and by 1975 had transformed this into the first time based media degree course in UK.

In 1976 he made This is a Television Receiver, transmitted by BBC television. Here David Hall revisited the theme of his classic This is a Video Monitor made in 1973. Other works by artists had been broadcast by now, but Hall set out to turn the domestic television set into a form of video sculpture through the intervention of his transmitted images.

Also In 1976 he initiated and was a founder of the artists' organisation London Video Arts in collaboration with Stuart Marshall, Stephen Partridge, Tamara Krikorian, Roger Barnard, David Critchley and others. This acted as a promotional agency, an artist-led workshop and a distribution service.

He has exhibited single screen and installation work internationally for more than forty years at many venues including Documenta Kassel, Tate Gallery London, Centre Georges Pompidou Paris, National Museum Reina Sofia Madrid, Museum of Contemporary Art Barcelona, and Museum of Modern Art Vienna.

In March and April 2012, in his solo exhibition End Piece ..., the centrepiece installation 1001 TV Sets (End Piece) (1972–2012) reprised the early 1970s works, and coincided with the switch-off of analogue broadcast transmissions in the London area. The exhibition, curated by Michael Maziere, also included two other installations Progressive Recession (1974) and TV Interruptions (7 TV Pieces): The Installation (1971/2006) and was at the Ambika P3 gallery, Marylebone Road, London, UK. A report in the Independent newspaper referred to him as the "Godfather of British Video Art".

Hall has sculpture, films, videotapes, installations and/or related material in the collections of the Tate Gallery London, Museum of Modern Art New York, Museo Nacional Centro de Arte Reina Sofia Madrid, Gemeente Museum The Hague, West Australia Art Gallery Perth, Calouste Gulbenkian Foundation, Arts Council of England, Contemporary Arts Society, British Film Institute, Great South West Corporation Atlanta USA, Richard Feigen Gallery New York, Visual Resources Inc. New York, Royal College of Art, Harvard University, ZKM Karlsruhe, and other public and private collections worldwide. Films and videotapes held by Lux London, National Film and Television Archive, Rewind Archive Scotland, and the Venice Biennale Archive.

In January 2012 David Hall received the inaugural Samsung Art+ Lifetime Achievement Award from an international jury at a British Film Institute celebratory event.

Tate acquired his iconic work 'TV Interruptions' (aka '7 TV Pieces) in 2014, and featured it (coincidentally) during the month of his death at TATE Britain. Richard Saltoun Gallery, London showed a selection of his work from July 17–14 August 2015, David Hall Situations Envisaged, curated by Stephen Partridge.
