= Eccles, Kent =

Village in Kent, England

Coordinates: 51.318900°N 0.480010°E

Eccles
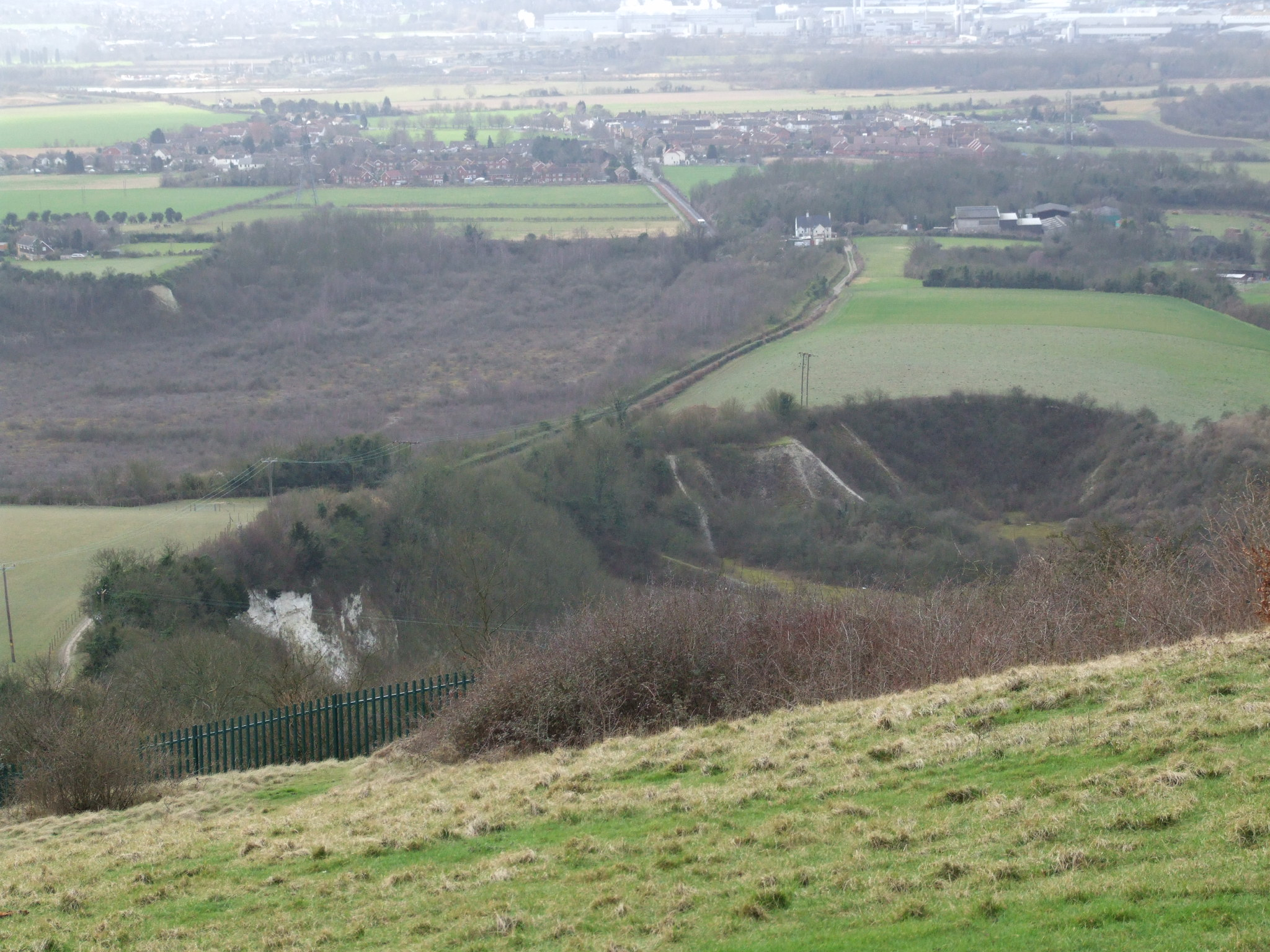
- Eccles from Blue Bell Hill

- Location within Kent
- District: Tonbridge and Malling
- Shire county: Kent
- Region: South East
- Country: England
- Sovereign state: United Kingdom
- Post town: Aylesford
- Postcode district: ME20
- Police: Kent
- Fire: Kent
- Ambulance: South East Coast
- UK Parliament: Chatham and Aylesford

Eccles is a village in the English county of Kent, part of the parish of Aylesford, and in the valley of the River Medway.

It is between Aylesford village and Burham, both a mile away. Shelter from the North Downs provides a favourable micro-climate for the village's vineyards.

== History ==
The nearby Eccles Roman Villa and pottery kiln were excavated between 1962 and 1976. The villa was occupied soon after the Roman invasion of Britain until they departed. It underwent at least four phases of construction, latterly comprised at least 37 rooms and may have had workshops, stores and wharves along the River Medway. Beneath the villa complex are traces of an Iron Age farmstead.

A Saxon cemetery was discovered at the villa containing at least 200 graves aligned east–west, some with a likely mid-seventh century date. Several skeletons had fatal weapon injuries, possibly from a single hostile event. Signs of reuse during the medieval period include cesspits and areas of rough cobblestones.

There is reference to a Common Park at Aylesford, dating to 1597, which has been interpreted as a deer park, although it could refer to common land. The park lay to the South of Eccles village, west of Bull Lane, and in 1805 was about 269 acres (109 ha).

Eccles was mostly farmland until Thomas Cubitt bought two farms near the river and built a steam powered brickyard and cement works. It could produce up to 30 million bricks a year. Buildings were positioned along tramway track on the gently sloping site so that material moved by gravity, with each stage of manufacture, closer to the quayside. Three miles of tram and railway connected the works buildings with the extraction pits and the wharf. Piped water was provided from a large reservoir. By 1900 the business had merged with others and was producing Blue Circle branded cement. At its peak, almost a thousand men and boys were employed making portland cement and Burham bricks from the Gault clay, but the site closed in 1941.

Local farmer Thomas Abbot built a terrace of 22 cottages on Bull Lane to house some of these workers, and the population soon increased to 300.

One account traces the settlement's present name back to 1208 and suggests that it derived from the 10th-century 'Aecclesse', meaning the 'meadow of the oak'. The Domesday Book of 1086 records Eccles as ‘Aiglessa’. At that time, it had a population of 22 households, putting it in the largest 40% of recorded settlements. It has also been suggested that the name 'Eccles' comes from the Latin word 'ecclesia' meaning 'church', implying that a post-Roman Christian community existed in the area, although there is no evidence for this. In 1798, Eccles was a manor of the parish of Aylesford, "which was of some note in the time of the Conqueror, being then part of the possessions of Odo, bishop of Baieux, the king's half brother, under the general title of whose lands it is thus entered in the book of Domesday". The site of the original manor of Eccles was lost to public knowledge by the 18th century, but it was surmised to be somewhere at the eastern extremity of the parish, near Boxley Hill.

== Amenities ==
There is a church, a convenience store with post office services, and a doctors’ surgery. The church hall on Cork Street is the village pre-school and over 50s drop-in centre.

At the centre of the village is a large park (‘the Rec’) with a skate park, children's play facilities and exercise equipment for adults. On weekends there are junior football games. Nearby, there is a sports field which has been used by Eccles Football Club since the 19th century. Outline planning permission has now been granted for housing development on this field.

As of 2017, there is one pub in Eccles, the grade II listed Red Bull. The Walnut Tree was demolished in 2012 and redeveloped as housing.

St Mark’s School is a small, mixed-year group, Church of England Primary School. It was rebuilt in 2002 close to the Victorian building it replaced but is now scheduled for demolition for housing development. A new school will be built on the outskirts of the village.

A library bus visits every Tuesday afternoon.

A farmers' market is held on every third Sunday of the month at Aylesford Priory which is within walking distance of the village.

== Transport ==
Eccles is three miles from junctions 5 and 6 of the M20 motorway, and the same distance from junction 3 of the M2 motorway. Maidstone East railway station is 4 1/2 miles away. The village also has road access to communities on the west bank of the River Medway by way of Peter's Bridge which was opened in September 2016.

There is a network of footpaths around the village providing access to the surrounding countryside, vineyards and the River Medway. There are all-weather footways south to Aylesford Priory and north to the Pilgrims' Way and thence to Burham. Beyond Burham, there is a combined footpath and cycle way down to the Riverside Walk at Peter's Village.

The Pilgrims' Way, North Downs Way and Medway Valley Walk pass within a mile of the village.

== In popular culture ==
The 2007 Tour de France through Kent included a section of the Pilgrims' Way close to the village.

== Kit’s Coty ==
Chapel Down planted a vineyard adjacent to Eccles village on land they acquired in 2007 and named it after Kit's Coty House ancient monument on the slope of the North Downs immediately above. Local conditions are reputed to be similar to those of the Champagne region in France.

The 95 acres (38 ha) of vineyard are planted with Chardonnay, Pinot Noir and Bacchus grapes.

The site had previously been identified for a station on the Channel Tunnel Rail Link but after opposition the rail route went through a tunnel under Blue Bell Hill, alongside the M2. Among those claiming credit for the change were a coven of white witches from Hastings who performed a ritual at Little Kit's Coty House on the Countless Stones to protect them from any disturbance by the railway.

The 'Ancient Sites of Aylesford' walk includes Eccles, Kit's Coty House and Little Kit's Coty House.

== Notable people ==
- Sharon Bennett, Illustrator, designer, artist and author
- Charlie Marks, Football player
