= Sharon Bennett =

British artist

Sharon File
- Born: Sharon File; 1958 (age 67–68) Eccles, Kent

Sharon File (born as Sharon File in 1958 in Eccles, Kent) is an English illustrator, designer, artist and author.

== Life and work ==
From head girl at Aylesford School, Sharon attended Medway College of Design (now University for the Creative Arts), leaving in 1978 to work as designer for Bass Riley in Knightsbridge. After various roles as illustrator and/or designer for other London agencies including B L Kearley Ltd. in Chilton Street, she became Packaging Designer for Trebor Bassett.

During the mid-nineties, she attracted the attention of Aceville Publications Crafts Beautiful magazine and began providing projects and gained a reputation for re-cycling objects by decorating them with her distinctive painting style. This led to work from the same publishers in their Quick and Crafty! magazine (now discontinued). Sharon's craft work has also been seen in Origins Quick Cards Made Easy and in the NSPCC title Your Family, published by Redwood in the UK.

== Books (as Sharon Bennett) ==
- Crafters Design Library Christmas – David & Charles ISBN 0-7153-1749-0
- Crafters Design Library Floral – David & Charles (ISBN 0715318330)
- Crafters Design Library Animals – David & Charles (ISBN 071532473X)
- Crafters Design Library Celebrations – David & Charles (ISBN 0715322478)
- Crafters Design Library Fairies – David & Charles (ISBN 0715327151)
- Crafters Design Library Men's Motifs – David & Charles (ISBN 0715332880)
