= Jasper White (photographer) =

British photographer

Jasper White (born 1973) is a British photographer. His work looks at the relationship between people and territory and how boundaries are defined within space.

He lives in East London.

== Biography ==
Born in East London and developing a passion for art and image-making at a young age, White studied art at Southend Art College, before going on to Kent Institute of Art & Design.

Alongside working in advertising, many publications have profiled his artwork.

White was the key speaker at the 2012 Grid Photo Festival in Amsterdam.

== Technique ==
Working primarily with Lambda prints, a process unparalleled in color saturation, White's spaces are rich in detail but often garish and brash.

Despite photographing human, man-made spaces, there is a distinct absence of people in his images, giving each space room for its own identity and allowing the viewer an opportunity to place themselves within the space. Many of White's images are shot from a direct angle, as if the viewer is standing at the entrance of the interior.

== Man Caves ==
White's first book 'Man Caves', which explores creative expression found in domestic, male-sculpted space, was released 1 July 2014, in Australia, by Thames & Hudson

== Tour Eiffel ==
White's current book project 'Tour Eiffel' looks at the lives of Parisians who share its view and their relationship with this iconic tower

== Awards ==
2018 The Prix de la Photographie Px3

2016 International Color Awards

2016 American Photography Annual 32

2015 International Color Awards

2014 Creative Review Photography Annual 2014 NDA Awards

2014 American Photography Annual 30

2014 American Photography Annual 22

2013 IPA Awards – Advertising – Self Promotion

2013 American Photography Annual 29

2011 Sony World Photography Awards

2010 Creative Review Photography Annual

2009 Creative Review Photography Annual

2008 AOP Open Award

2007 Creative Review Photography Annual

2006 American Photography Annual 22

== Selected exhibitions ==
2015 'Downstairs At Mother' Tour Eiffel & Bird Cages

2015 Gallerynine5 For That Which is Sacred

2013 Getty Images Gallery

2012 Grid Photo Festival, Amsterdam

2012 Tunis, Amsterdam

2012 Gallerynine5, New York

2012 Nest & Caves, New York

2011 The Coldharbour London Gallery

2011 Here We Are Exhibition, London

2010 Gallery Nine5 Collection, New York

2009 Getty Images Gallery, London

2009 Undercover, London

2008 The Print Space, London

2008 Red Light, London
