= Jal R. Patel =

Indian Physician

- Born: October 21, 1910; India
- Occupation: Physician
- Awards: 1962 Padma Bhushan

Jal Ratanji Patel was an Indian physician, who attended to Mohammed Ali Jinnah, the founder of Pakistan, during the years the latter was being treated for Tuberculosis. Patel, who was born into a Parsi family, kept Jinnah's disease a secret which had impact on the Partition of India. In his book Freedom at Midnight, Dominique Lapierre claimed that Patel had handed over a confidential file pertaining to Jinnah, and that Patel kept his patient's condition a secret on the patient's advice. The Government of India awarded Patel Padma Bhushan, the third highest Indian civilian award, in 1962.
