= Jayne Parker =

British artist and film-maker (born 1957)

- Born: 1957 (age 67–68); Nottingham, England
- Occupation(s): Artist and film-maker
- Employer(s): Slade School of Fine Art, University College London

Jayne Parker (born 1957) is a British artist and film-maker, whose work has been widely exhibited, including at international film festivals and on television. She is Professor of Fine Art, Fine Art Media at Slade School of Fine Art, University College London.

== Background ==
Born in Nottingham in 1957, she studied sculpture at Canterbury College of Art (1977–1980) and Experimental Media at the Slade, where she was appointed Head of Graduate Fine Art Media in 2010.

Exhibitions in which her work has been shown include Sign of the Times at the Museum of Modern Art, Oxford (1990) and Elective Affinities at Tate Liverpool (1993).

Her films have been shown in art galleries and museums in the UK and internationally, as well as at cinemas and film festivals, music festivals and on television. In 2003, she was the recipient of the 1871 Fellowship hosted by the Ruskin School of Drawing, Oxford and the San Francisco Art Institute, researching the relationship between music and film.
