= Kent Institute of Art & Design =

Former art school in Kent, England

Coordinates: 51°16′16″N 0°29′55″E

The Kent Institute of Art & Design (KIAD, often /ˈkaɪ.æd/) was an art school based across three campuses in the county of Kent, in the United Kingdom. It was formed by the amalgamation of three independent colleges: Canterbury College of Art, Maidstone College of Art and Medway (Rochester) College of Design. In turn KIAD merged with the Surrey Institute of Art & Design, University College on 1 August 2005 to form the University College for the Creative Arts at Canterbury, Epsom, Farnham, Maidstone and Rochester. In 2008, this gained full university status and became the University for the Creative Arts.

KIAD offered further education, higher education, postgraduate and part-time courses at three campuses, in Canterbury, Maidstone and Rochester.

== History ==
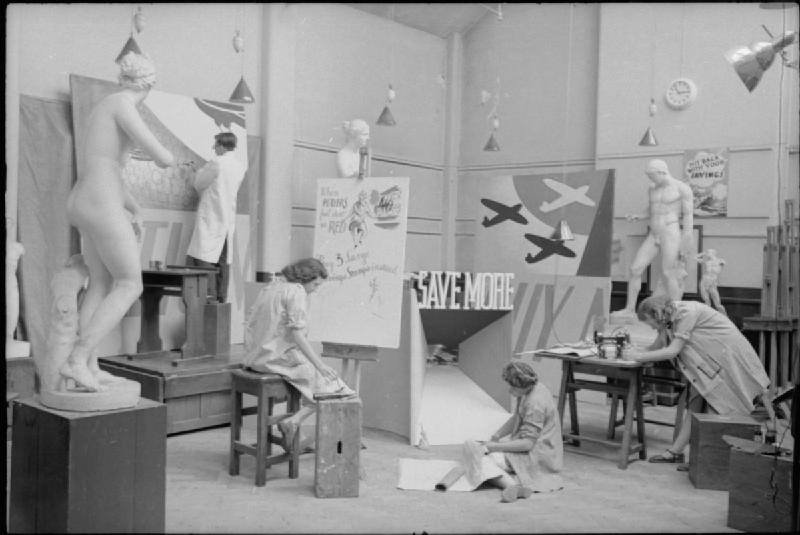
Students work at the Sydney Cooper School of Art in 1941

Maidstone College of Art was founded on 12 August 1867, and Rochester College of Art (renamed Medway College of Design in June 1970) on 15 September 1886. The origin of Canterbury College of Art lies in the private art school founded by the Victorian animal painter Thomas Sidney Cooper on 13 September 1882, and known then as the Canterbury Sidney Cooper School of Art. After his death in 1902 the Canterbury Sidney Cooper School of Art continued until October 1935 when it was taken over by the City of Canterbury Education Committee. The Education Committee took on all the assets and liabilities of the Canterbury Sidney Cooper School of Art and until July 1972 it remained housed in the building that had been the home and studio of Cooper in the centre of Canterbury. It then moved to a new site on the New Dover Road.

Canterbury College of Art and School of Architecture was by this time operating under the aegis of the newly reorganised Kent County Council, along with the Maidstone College of Art and Rochester College of Art. Ravensbourne College of Art located in Chislehurst was also in an informal relationship to these three, by virtue of being technically in the county of Kent, but under the administrative control of Bromley Borough Council rather than Kent County Council. It was the three colleges under the direct control of Kent County Council that went on to form the Kent Institute of Art & Design (KIAD) on 14 September 1987.

The initial Director of the Kent Institute of Art & Design (KIAD) was Peter Ivor Williams, an artist in his own right and former principal of the Lincoln School of Art and Medway College of Design, Rochester, who ran KIAD from 14 September 1987 to 23 August 1996. He was instrumental in gathering the Maidstone College of Art, Rochester College of Art and Canterbury College of Art together, but reframed from amalgamating them into one single campus because he recognised their individual cultural connections within their communities.

A notable feature of the Canterbury College of Art at this time was the number of former tutors and students from Leeds College of Art who started working there. This arose from Thomas Watt being made Head of Fine Art at Canterbury on 13 September 1968, Watt having previously been a teaching colleague of Harry Thubron at Leeds College of Art. Under Watt the radical Leeds teaching methods developed by Thubron were imported into Canterbury through the employment of other artists from Leeds, such as Stass Paraskos, Thomas Pemberton and Dennis Creffield. Another key member of staff was Eric Hurren, who led the Foundation Course in Art and Design from September 1963 to June 1988.

The merger of institutions to create the Kent Institute of Art & Design (KIAD) was not without controversy and was effectively imposed on Kent County Council by the National Advisory Body for Local Authority Higher Education (NABLAHE) of HM Government. This was in spite of concerted opposition from Kent County Council, Maidstone College of Art, Rochester College of Art, Canterbury College of Art, the local Member of Parliament, David Crouch, and a large number of figures in the artistic world at the time, who petitioned Parliament. In the original proposal the intention of HM Government was to merge the Maidstone College of Art, Rochester College of Art, and Canterbury College of Art, and then close at least one of them. The creation of KIAD was effectively a compromise solution that caused duplicate courses at the different sites to be closed, but the individual colleges themselves remained open.

One of the ironies of the history of Canterbury College of Art is that the original home of the Canterbury Sidney Cooper School of Art, in Cooper's house, again became a place for teaching art in March 2004 when another educational institution in the city, Canterbury Christ Church University, used the building to house its School of Creative Arts and Industries, within the Faculty of Arts, Humanities and Education. The basement of the Kent Institute of Art & Design (KIAD) is believed to be haunted by soldiers from the First French Empire of the Napoleonic Wars, who had been captured by the British Army and Royal Navy, and placed into brickwalled tunnels beneath Fort Pitt in Rochester. Some of the tunnels were partially demolished when the original Rochester College of Art was constructed in 1970. Over the years many janitors, lecturers and students at Rochester College of Art have heard banging and scraping noises coming from the basement of the building.

== Notable alumni and staff ==
=== Students ===
- Shynola, Directors
- Samira Abbassy, painter
- Wale Adeyemi, fashion designer
- Jal Patel, Published Author
- Charlie Adlard, comic book artist
- Justin Bere, architect
- Billy Childish, foundation 1977 (who was banned from the Rochester site at Fort Pitt in the Medway Towns in 1981 for publishing "obscene" poetry)
- Babette Cole, children's writer and illustrator
- Richard P. Cook, artist
- Sharon Bennett, English illustrator, designer, artist and author
- John Copnall, abstract artist and teacher,
- Wendy Dagworthy OBE, fashion designer, Royal College of Art professor
- Roger Dean, artist
- Marcus Dillistone, Royal premiered film director, music producer Athens 2004 Olympic opening and closing ceremonies
- Tracey Emin, 1999 Turner Prize nominee
- Clive Evans, known as "Clive", London couture designer of the 1960s
- Lizzie Farey, wood artist
- Brian Froud, fantasy artist
- Gordon Frickers, marine artist
- Lasse Gjertsen, videographer
- Jackie Hatfield, artist and writer
- Tony Hart, TV personality
- Bob Holness, broadcaster
- John Joseph Haldane, philosopher, broadcaster
- Martin Handford, illustrator and creator of Where's Wally?
- Bryan Ingham, etcher, painter, sculptor
- Tony Kaye, director
- Andrew Kötting, film maker, writer, artist
- Ástþór Magnússon, Icelandic businessman and peace activist, a perennial candidate for the office of President of Iceland.
- James Mayhew, writer and illustrator of children's books
- Karen Millen, fashion designer
- Bill Mitchell founder of site-specific theatre company Wildworks.
- Humphrey Ocean, artist
- Jack Hues (Jeremy Allan Ryder), singer, songwriter and musician in Wang Chung
- Stass Paraskos, artist and founder of the Cyprus College of Art
- Jayne Parker, artist
- Toni del Renzio, artist and writer
- Zandra Rhodes, fashion designer
- David Shaw, painter, silk-screener, tutor
- Richard Spare, artist
- Stuckist artists: Charles Thomson, Bill Lewis, Philip Absolon, Charles Williams, Sanchia Lewis
- Julie Verhoeven, illustrator/artist and fashion designer
- Muriel Wood, children's book illustrator
- Ray Davies, musician
- Angus Fairhurst, part of the Young British Artists
- Jasper White, British photographer

=== Staff ===
Tutors include: Ian Dury, Stephen Farthing, David Hall, A. L. Rees and David Hockney.

Artist Mike Chaplin was a technician in the early 1970s, and Quentin Crisp a model at Maidstone College.
