= David Shaw (painter) =

English painter

David Shaw (4 March 1952 – 27 December 1989) was an English painter, print-maker and lecturer.

== Biography ==
The son of William Shaw by his wife Alice Frid, David Douglas Ernest Shaw was born in Kent, where he lived all his life. He was educated at Canterbury College of Art from 1970–73 and then returned there around 1984 as a lecturer in the Fine Art department and drawing tutor to Graphics Department.

== Art career ==
Six of Shaw's paintings were exhibited in The Male Nude, A Modern View, at Homeworks in London, which ran from 15 November 1983 until January 1984.

Some of Shaw non-male nude paintings were rescued from The Mill House, Kennington, Ashford prior to the sale of the property in 2012. Untitled (Homage to Eduardo Luigi Paolozzi (1978)) this work is 24” x 24” acrylics on canvas. Another painting “Untitled” which is believed to be the only self-portrait of Shaw. He also made an untitled Painting believed to be an abstract portrait of HRH Queen Elizabeth.

His painting, Reflections, Summer (1982), is in the collection of the Arts Council at the Southbank Centre, London.

In Art & Artists (1982) Edward Lucie-Smith described Shaw's paintings as "Having another dimension – they are not only prose, but poetry.... these pictures are therefore memorable not only for their remarkable technical accomplishment but because they leave such a long and lingering echo in our minds. The clean, powerful draughtsmanship which Shaw brought to these pictures [de Louville's Ebury gallery 1982] provided part of the inspiration for a mixed exhibition of male nudes, as the quality of his work, and also the response it received, suggested that the time had come for a reconsideration of the subject."

== Shaw Studio sale ==
Shaw's studio sale was held at Bonham's, London on 15 December 1994. The whole studio was divided by Bonham's into sixty lots, of oil and acrylic paintings, screenprints and serigraphs. They had been left to the Artists General Benevolent Fund. A short introduction to the catalogue was provided by fellow Kentish painter John Stanton Ward, RA (1917–2007), who began: "I used to see David Shaw bring his pictures to my son's workshop for framing and so came to know both him and his painting. A framer's a good place to meet painters and see their work..."

== Group exhibitions ==
- RA 1976, no. 992, Wattle Hurdle, pencil;
- Galerie Mathilde, Amsterdam, 1979;
- Bede Gallery, Jarrow, 1979;
- P.S. Galleries, Dallas, 1981 & 1983;
- P.S. Galleries, Maine, 1982;
- 15 November 1983 - March 1984, six works in The Male Nude, A modern view, at Homeworks, Pimlico Road, London, organised by Francois de Louville, Mary-Rose Beaumont (chairman), John Russell-Taylor, Dr John George (editor of Art & Artists), Emmanuel Cooper, Edward Lucie-Smith, & Francois de Louville.

== Solo exhibitions ==
- Aberbach Fine Art, 17 Savile Row, London, 1977, 1978, 1980;
- Ebury Gallery, 89 Ebury Street, London, 1982 L'homme et le Pantin;
- Thumb Gallery [Jill George], 20/21 D'Arbaly Street, Soho, London, 1985;
- Henley Festival, Pastoral Perspectives 1973-1985; in tandem with works by John Piper;
- Line Art Gallery (part of Art Line Magazine), 1-3 Garratt Lane, SW18, Serigraphs, January 1988.
