= Museum of Art & Photography =

Art museum based in Bangalore, India

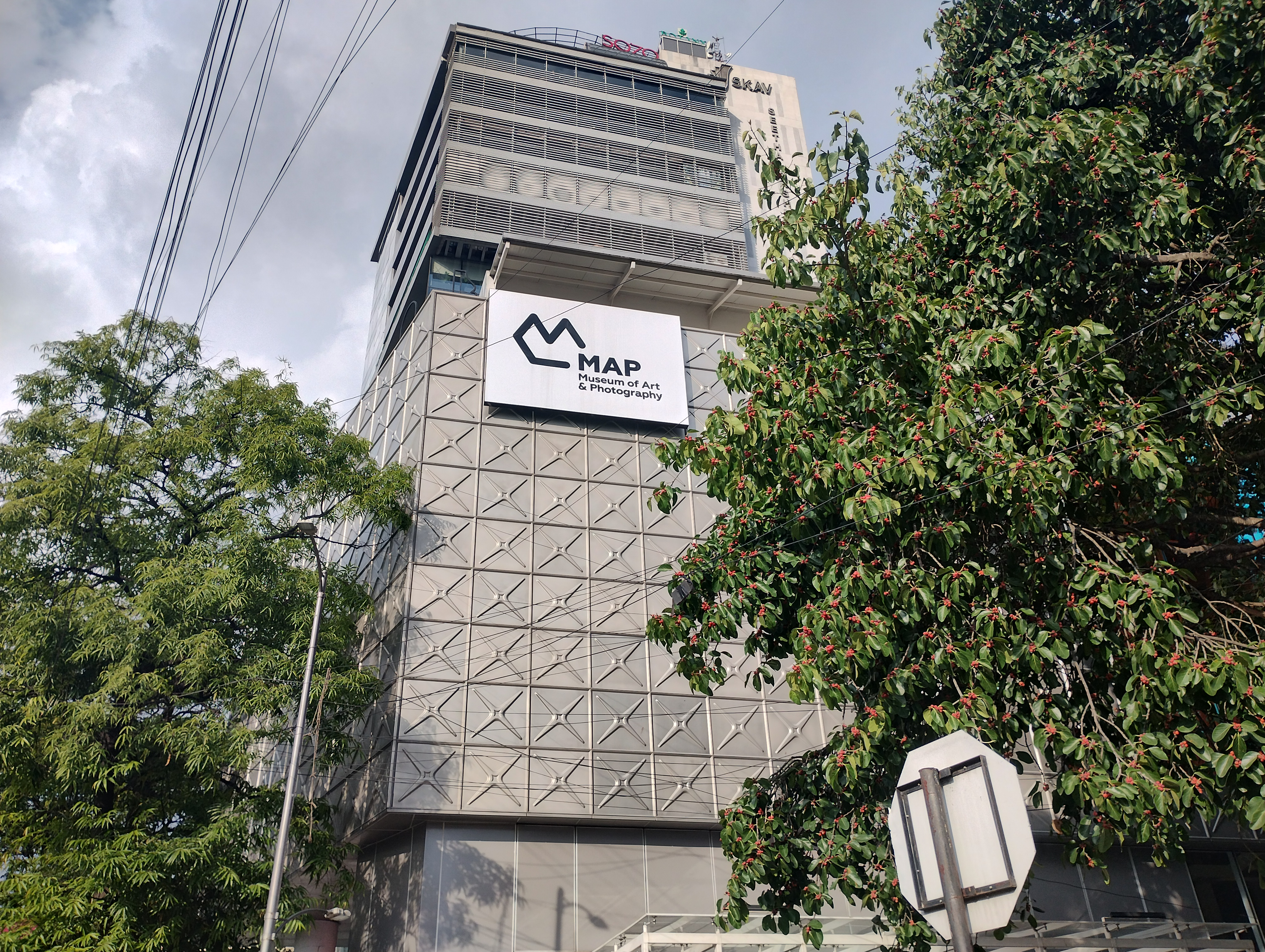
- Location: Kasturba Road Cross, Bangalore
- Coordinates: 12.9745°N 77.5969°E
- Type: Art Museum
- Founder: Abhishek Poddar
- Public transit access: Kasturba Road
- Parking: On site, underground
- Website: https://map-india.org/

The Museum of Art and Photography (MAP) is a private Indian art museum based in Bangalore with a collection of Indian art, textiles, photography, craft, and design objects spanning from the twelfth century to the present.

Launched as a digital Museum in 2020, the museum opened its doors to the public on 18 February 2023 displaying the private collection donated by Abhishek Poddar, its founder.

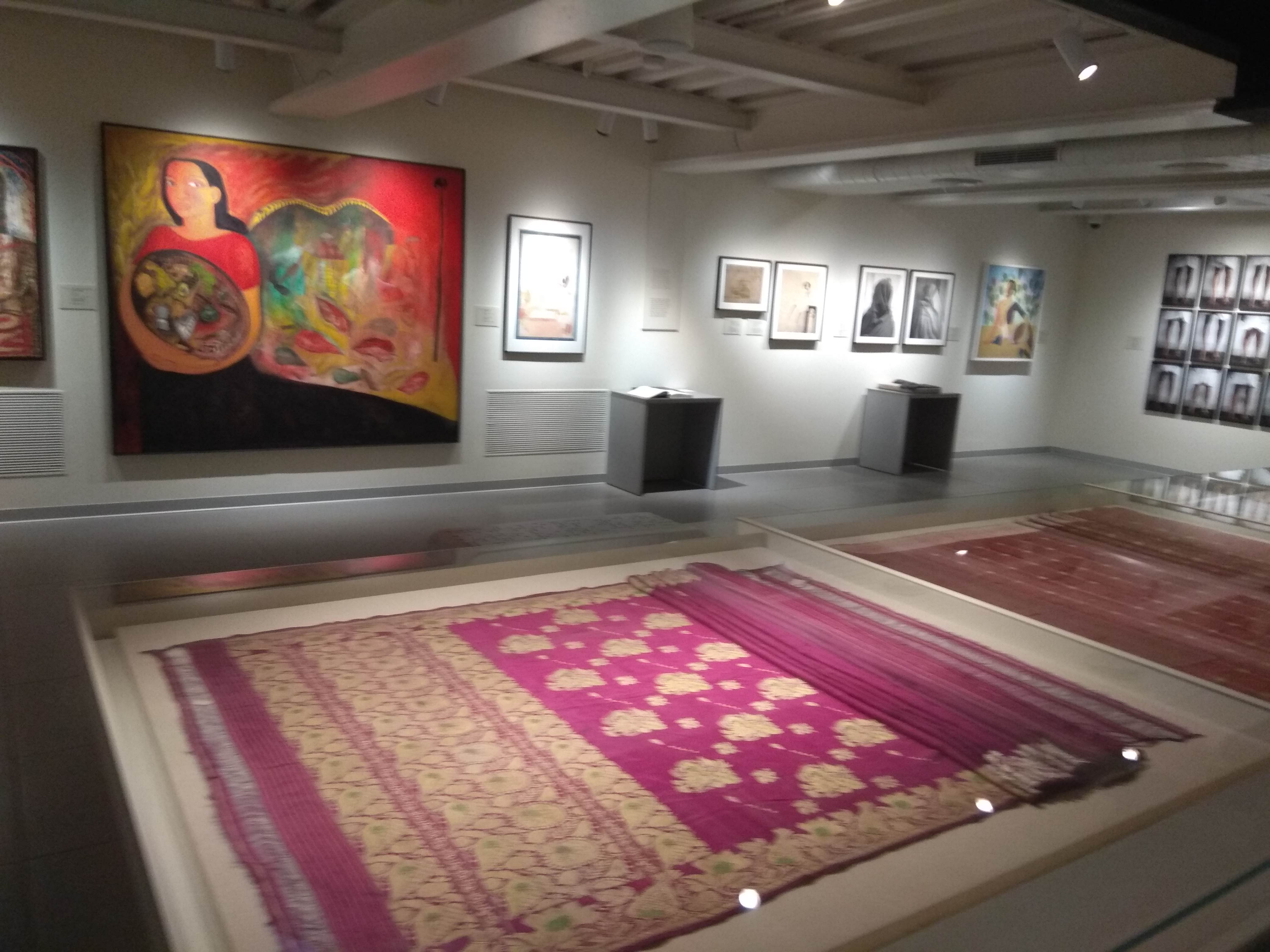
A view of a gallery in MAP

== Collections ==
MAP has more than 20,000 artworks, predominantly from the Indian subcontinent in its collection that are organised into six departments: Modern and Contemporary Art, Photography, Living Traditions, Popular Culture, Pre-Modern Art and Textiles, Craft and Design. The collection a collection of photographs, and works by indigenous artists.

In 2017, Abhishek Poddar, the founder of the MAP, donated more than 7000 artworks to the museum.

== Abhishek Poddar ==
Abhishek Poddar (born 1968), an Indian industrialist, philanthropist, and art collector, is the founder of the Museum of Art and Photography, Bengaluru. Besides serving on various boards and committees in India, Poddar also serves on the advisory committees of the India-Europe Foundation for New Dialogues, headquartered in Rome and on the Lincoln Centre Global Advisory Council. He has been collecting art since high school and has created a collection of South Asian art, craft and antiquities, including modern and contemporary art and photography, a majority of which he has donated to the museum's collection. In December 2016, Christie’s also held an auction of a large chunk of the Poddar family’s personal collection, and the funds acquired were used for establishing south India's first major private art museum.

== Publications ==
In December 2018, MAP published a book on Gond-Pardhan artist, Jangarh Singh Shyam, written by Dr. Jyotindra Jain. The book includes transcripts of his final letter to his wife, Nankushiya, and his mother, Adharabai. The letter was written a few days before his death and contained his explanation of his frame of mind.

== Building ==
The museum is located on Kasturba Road in Bengaluru. The designs for the five floor, 44,000 square feet museum include five galleries, an auditorium, research library, classroom, restoration lab, storage, and sculpture garden. Designed by Mathew & Ghosh Architects, the construction was overseen by an architectural committee that included Rahul Mehrotra, Mahrukh Tarapor, and the late Martand Singh.

== Art (is) Life Festival ==
In December 2020, MAP launched their digital museum with a week-long, online festival entitled, Art (is) Life. The festival featured known cultural figures such as Javed Akhtar, actor Shabana Azmi, classical dancer Malavika Sarukkai, film and theatre professional Arundhati Nag, art historian B. N. Goswamy, filmmaker Nandita Das, visual artist Jitish Kallat, and singer Kavita Seth.

The remaining days of the festival featured daily 45-minute programs that took viewers through different selected departments of the MAP collection and featured stories from the collections, performances, and collaborations with international museums.

== Exhibitions ==
As part of the digital launch, MAP launched a new online exhibitions section on its website, with three shows on the studio photographer, Suresh Punjabi, from Nagda in Madhya Pradesh; on the life and work of the Bhil artist and Padma Shri awardee, Bhuri Bai; and on Tallur LN's work Interference. The museum releases a new online exhibition every month, with the 2022 ones being on kantha textiles, the South Asian artist Zoya Siddiqui, Bangalore-based artist Shanthamani M., and an exhibition that looks at the intersection of food and art. In 2024, the museum is celebrating the birth centenary of master print-maker artist Krishna Reddy, with the exhibition Rhyme Unbroken — Krishna Reddy as Artist and Perpetual Student.

== Events ==
MAP hosts digital events every month that range from talks with cultural figures, including Sebastião Salgado, Marina Abramović, Vidya Dehejia, Paul Fernandes, and Navina Najat Haidar, as well as workshops, masterclasses, panel discussions, and exhibition tours. Through its online events, equipped with Indian Sign Language interpretation. After the onset of the countrywide lockdown in March 2020, MAP shifted the museum’s programming and outreach efforts to the digital space. In 2021, the museum launched two expert series for museum professionals: the Deep Dive, which brings together historians and curators such as Dr. Sook-Kyung Lee of Tate Modern, to speak on a wide range of subjects; and Director's Cut, which features directors from museums around the world in conversation with MAP's director, Kamini Sawhney. Cecilia Alemani of the High Line, New York, and Victoria Noorthoorn of the Museo de Arte Moderno de Buenos Aires have been featured in the Director's Cut series.

== Education ==
Education in art and culture is one of MAP’s key focus areas. The education team at MAP regularly curates programs that cater to a wide range of audiences, from young children and teens to adults. From workshops for school students or capacity building for teachers, to masterclasses for adults and open-to-all public lectures, MAP highlights art and culture in one's life and to offer audiences new ways of engaging with the MAP collection. As part of its education initiative, MAP launched Discover MAP, which comprise art packs for children that uncover an artist's body of work, or a movement in art history, such as Arpita Singh, Portraiture, Manjit Bawa, Jamini Roy, and more.

== Impart ==
Founded in 2022, Impart (formerly MAP Academy) is an online platform dedicated to fostering deeper engagement with South Asia’s art and cultural histories. The organisation develops comprehensive, freely accessible resources that bridge connections between museums, universities, cultural institutions, and the public.

Impart’s initiatives include the first-ever Encyclopedia of Art from South Asia, spanning over 2,000 entries; a suite of Learning Resources, including courses, live lectures, online talks, and videos; Perspectives, an editorial programme featuring contributions from across the region and beyond; and a range of Special Projects, including multimedia efforts, grants, and organisational partnerships.

== Museums Without Borders ==
With the aim of linking collections globally, Museums Without Borders is a digital collaboration between MAP and institutions in India and throughout the world. Ranging from six to ten minutes, each episode in this series juxtaposes an artwork from MAP with an object from a partner museum. By 2022, MAP had released ten episodes, featuring works from the British Museum, London, Detroit Institute of Arts, Museum of Fine Arts, Boston, Victoria and Albert Museum, London, Maharaja Sawai Man Singh II Museum, Jaipur, Partition Museum, Amritsar and others.

== Digital Experiences ==
In a 2020 collaboration with Accenture, MAP launched India's first conversational digital persona of the celebrated artist, MF Husain. A digital experience created using artificial intelligence (AI), Husain’s persona gives a glimpse into the life and work of one of India’s most compelling artists. Viewers simply ask Husain’s digital twin a question regarding his early life, family, or career and receive a simulated response from the digital persona. The Husain AI experience is available on the museum's website and also as a 3-D hologram at the museum’s physical space.

== Media gallery ==
Museum of Art & Photography in 2025
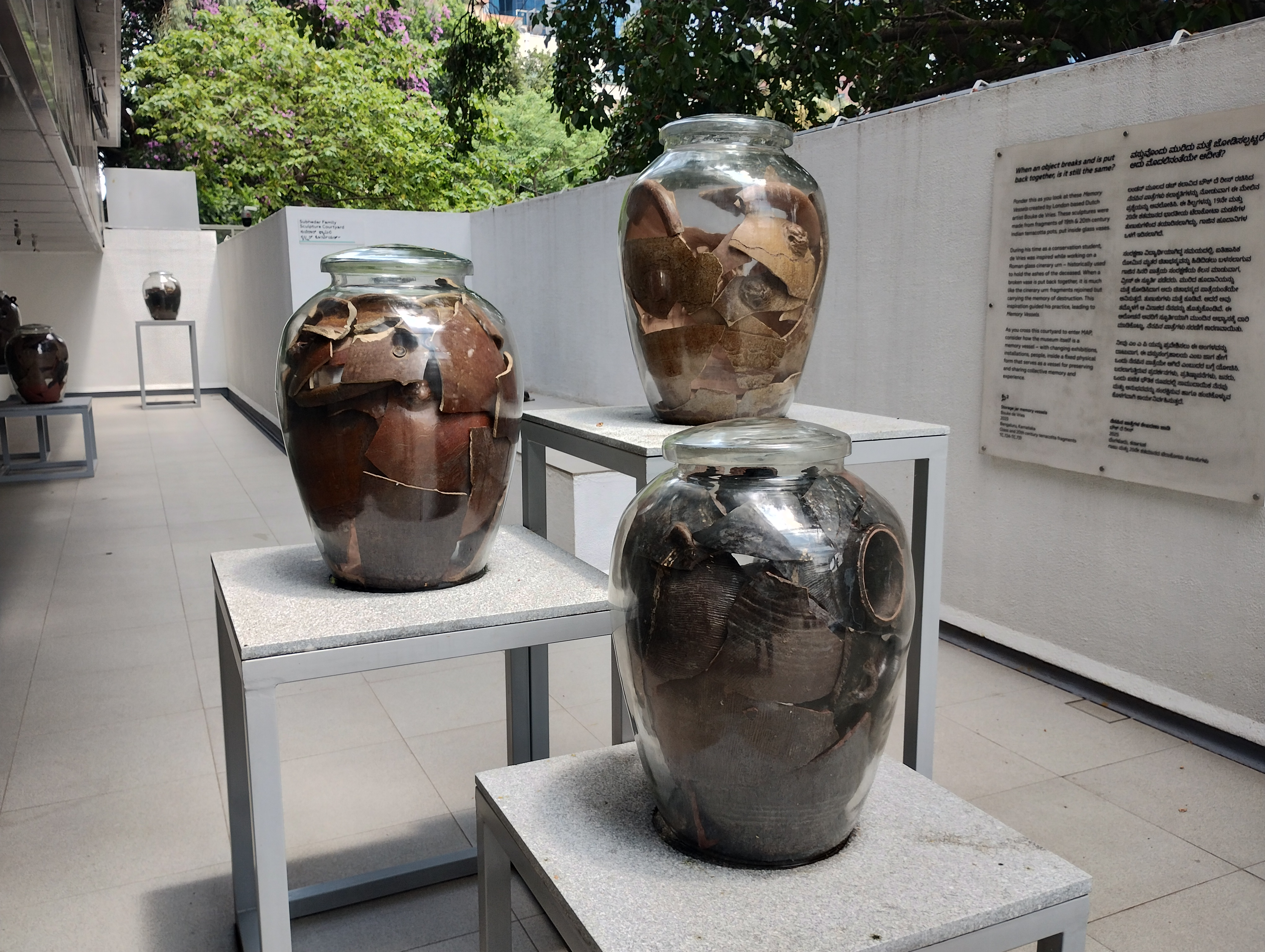

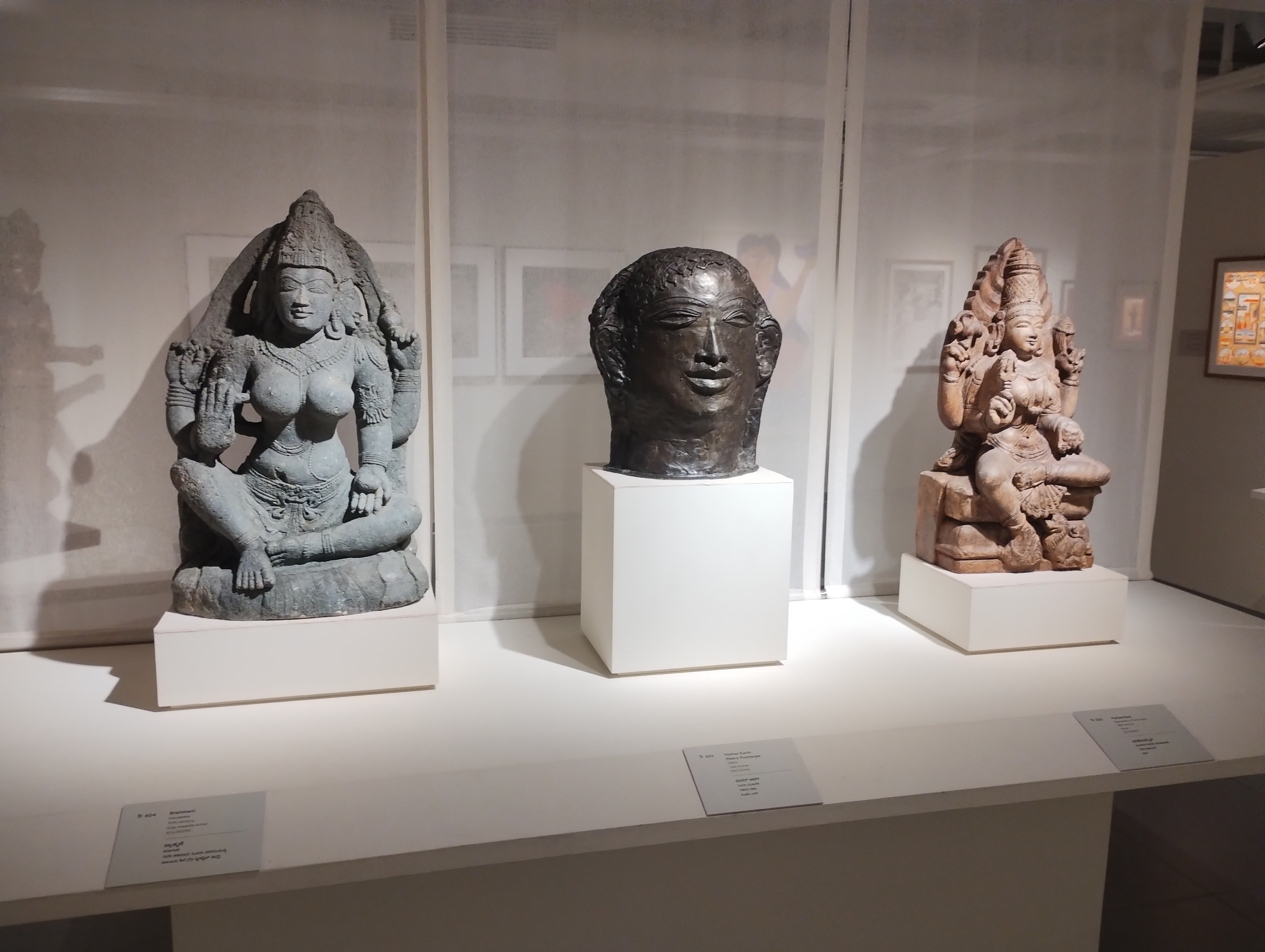

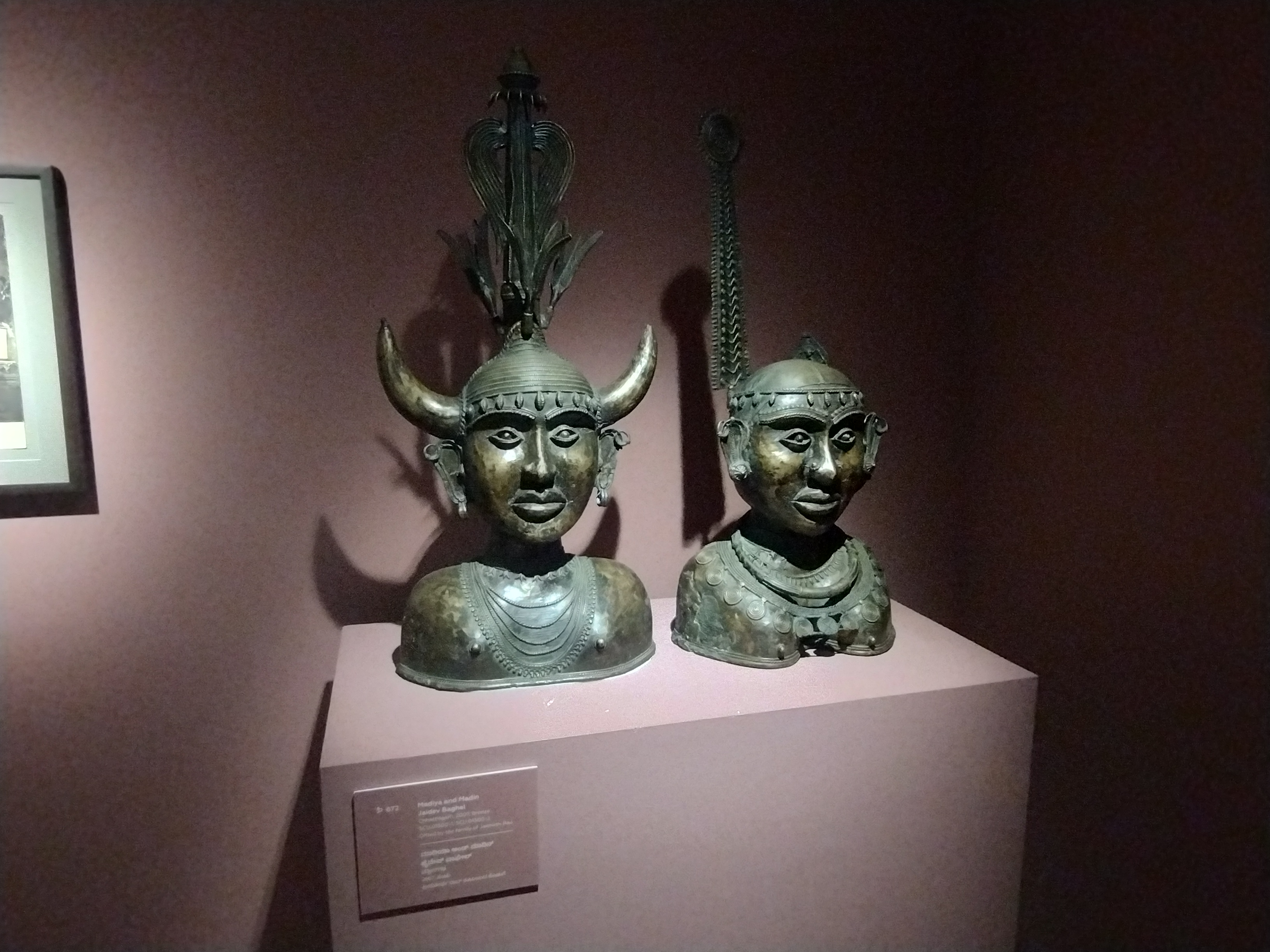

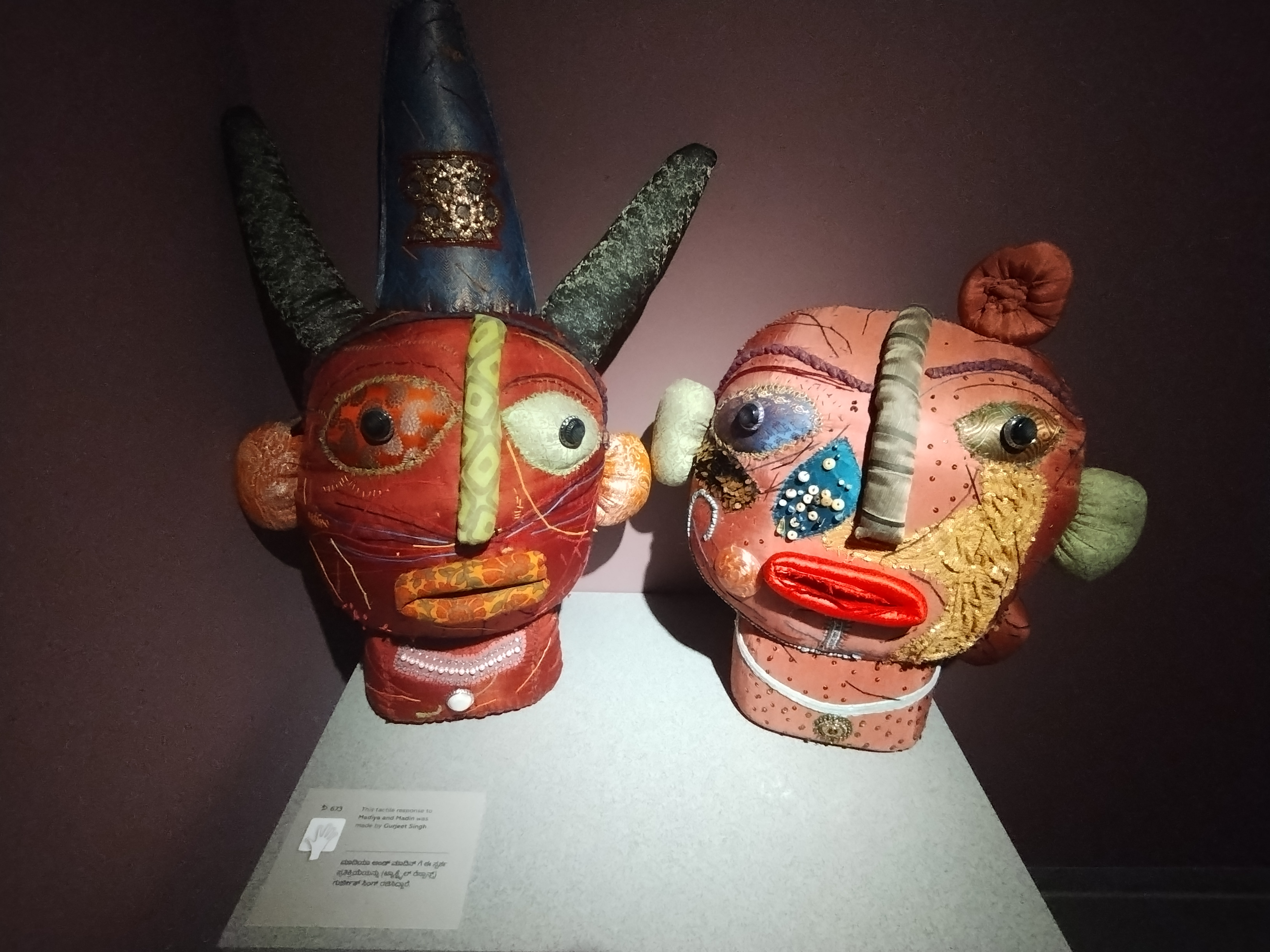

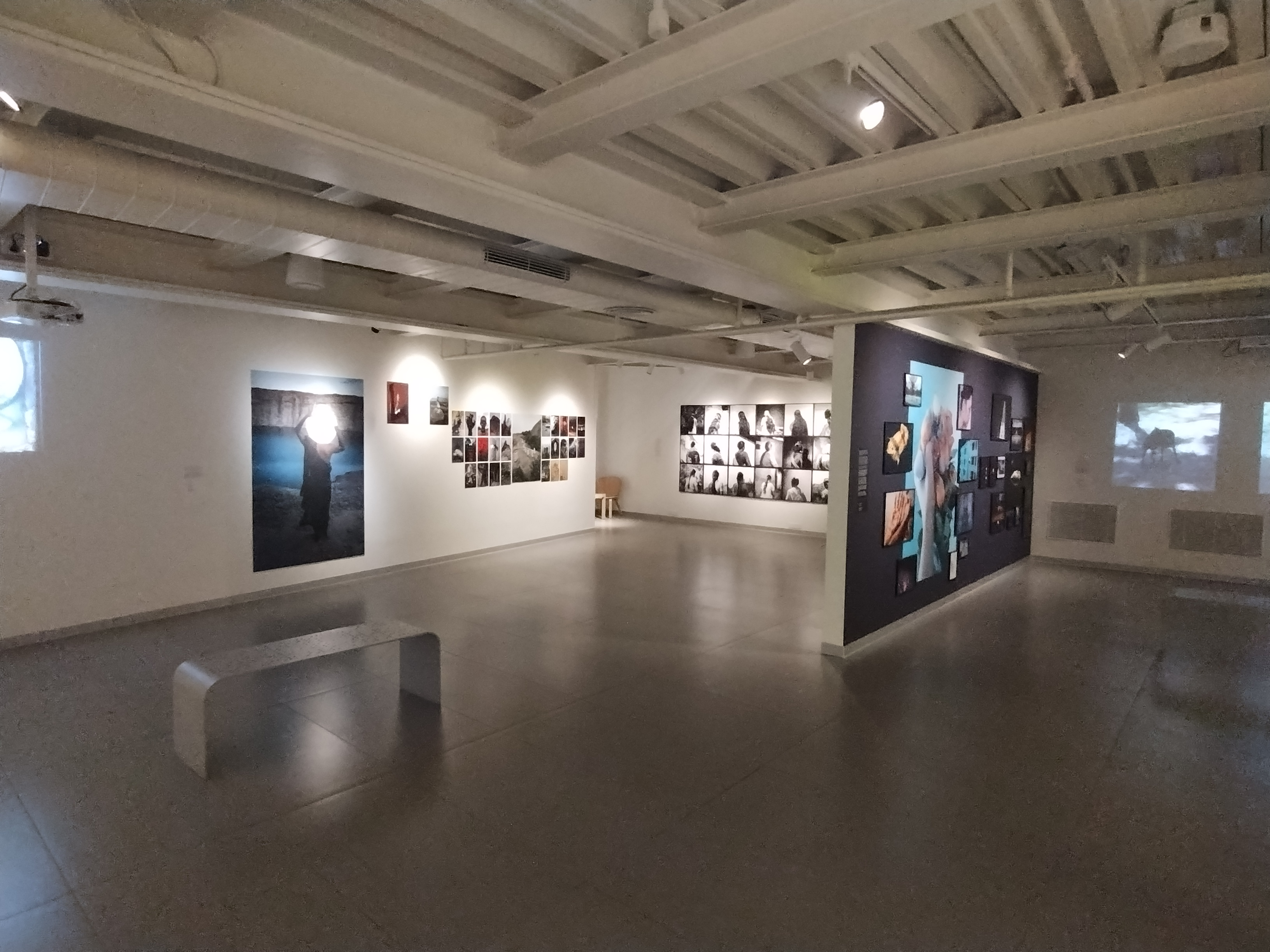
