= A. L. Rees =

British writer and teacher about film

Alan Leonard Rees (18 May 1949 – 28 November 2014) was a British writer and teacher on film who celebrated and promoted experimental filmmaking. He was also active in the London Film-Makers' Co-op, advised the Arts Council, the British Film Institute, the Tate Gallery and the Arts & Humanities Research Council.

He was the author of A History of Experimental Film and Video (2011, Second Edition, 2019), which remains an influential and standard textbook on the subject. Until his retirement, he was a tutor in visual communication at the Kent Institute of Art & Design formerly known as Maidstone College of Art and later the Royal College of Art in London.

== Bibliography ==
- A History of Experimental Film and Video, BFI Publishing, 2011, 208 p. ISBN 978-1844574360
- A History of Experimental Film and Video, BFI Publishing, 2019, 208 p. ISBN 978-1-84457-107-9
