= Richard Morrison (film titles designer) =

Richard Morrison (born September 1953) is an English designer of film title sequences. He has created over 150 feature film title sequences in a career of more than thirty years.

Having studied graphics, photography and film, Morrison's initial career began on the James Bond film series collaborating with an American graphic designer Maurice Binder. He has worked on film openers ever since for film directors including Franc Roddam, Ridley Scott and Jean-Jacques Annaud. His title sequences include films such as Batman, Enemy at the Gates, Gandhi, Brazil and The Killing Fields.

Describing his work in an interview with Empire (August 2008) Morrison explained: "I look for a nuance, a subliminal energy in a film that I can then work into an idea. A lot of my title sequences don’t give much away, but they give you a flavour. So the viewer thinks - Oh, this is intriguing, show me more…"

Morrison has been chairman of Europe's film and animation conference “Pencil to Pixel” since 2002, and in 2009 he was appointed Honorary Professor of Digital Film School of Media Arts and Imaging at the University of Dundee, Scotland.

Morrison is currently developing a few film title sequences including Tim Burton's Frankenweenie and Dark Shadows as well as David Mamet's currently untitled biopic on Phil Spector.

== Selected film title sequences ==
- Quadrophenia (1979)
- Gandhi (1982)
- The Killing Fields (1984)
- A Passage to India (1984)
- Brazil (1985)
- Someone to Watch Over Me (1987)
- A Fish Called Wanda (1988)
- Batman (1989)
- K2 (1991)
- Event Horizon (1997)
- Seven Years in Tibet (1997)
- Spice World (1997)
- High Fidelity (2000)
- Enemy at the Gates (2001)
- 9 Dead Gay Guys (2002)
- Girl with a Pearl Earring (2003)
- The Dreamers (2003)
- Creep (2004)
- Seed of Chucky (2004)
- Valiant (2005)
- The Constant Gardener (2005)
- Tideland (2005)
- As You Like It (2006)
- The Golden Compass (2007)
- Sweeney Todd: The Demon Barber of Fleet Street (2007)
- Vantage Point (2008)
- Tamara Drewe (2010)
- Scott Pilgrim vs. the World (2010)
- Phil Spector (directed by David Mamet; 2012)
- Lay the Favourite (directed by Stephen Frears; 2012)
- Welcome to the Punch (executive produced by Ridley Scott; 2012)
- The Cold Light of Day (directed by Mabrouk El Mechri; 2012)
- Frankenweenie (directed by Tim Burton; 2012)
- Dark Shadows (directed by Tim Burton; 2012)
- Muhammad Ali's Greatest Fight (directed by Stephen Frears; 2013)
- Half of a Yellow Sun (directed by Biyi Bandele; 2013)
- One Direction: This Is Us (directed by Morgan Spurlock; 2013)
- Believe (directed by David Scheinmann; 2013)
- Day of the Flowers (directed by John Roberts; 2013)
- Dementamania (directed by Kit Ryan; 2013)
- The Numbers Station (directed by Kasper Barfoed; 2013)
- Elsa & Fred (directed by Michael Radford; 2014)
- The Two Faces of January (directed by Hossein Amini; 2014)
- Calvary (directed by John Michael McDonagh; 2014)
- A Long Way Down (directed by Pascal Chaumeil; 2014)
