= Tamara Krikorian =

British video artist and a public art curator

- Born: 5 July 1944; Dorset, United Kingdom
- Died: 11 July 2009 (aged 65)
- Known for: Video art
- Partner: Ivor Davies

Tamara Seta Krikorian (5 July 1944–11 July 2009) was a British video artist and a public art curator.

== Biography ==
Born in Dorset from an Armenian family, she was educated in London where she studied music. In 1966 she moved to Edinburgh, Scotland where she met her partner Ivor Davies.

She was a pioneer of video art. She started using video in 1973 in Scotland. She taught at Maidstone College of Art and in Newcastle. In 1976 she was among the founders of London Video Arts. In 1981 she moved to Wales, where she became director of the Welsh Sculpture Trust in 1984 (which in 1990 became Cywaith Cymru/Artworks Wales). She ran the agency until her retirement. She died in 2009.

== Works ==
Her works include: In the Minds Eye, Unassembled Information, Vanitas, Eyebath (1977); Vanitas/Still Life (1978); Heart of the Illusion: Landscape, Still Life a Self Portrait (1981). In 1983 she made Sabra and Shatila massacres in Beirut that was included in the Expanded Cinema exhibition at Tate in 2009.
