= Norwich Women's Film Weekend =

Film festival in Norwich, England

The Norwich Women's Film Weekend (NWFW) was a two-day annual event that ran for 10 years, from 1979 to 1989, at Cinema City in Norwich. It was organised to 'promote and encourage women film-makers and present the audience with films dealing with women's issues', as the first programme (1979) put it. It was the first event created, curated, managed and implemented by a group called Cinewomen. The NWFW lasted longer than any other women's film festival in the UK and forms part of the history of women's cinema and feminism more generally, and also the history of culture and the arts in Norwich.

== Origins ==
The event was initiated in the late 1970s by Ginette Vincendeau, who had just started her PhD in film studies at the University of East Anglia (UEA) and was a member of the Council of Management of what was then known as the Norfolk and Norwich Film Theatre (NNFT). Part-sponsored by the Eastern Arts Association and the British Film Institute (BFI), NNFT became Cinema City in April 1978. Vincendeau was joined by UEA librarian Biddy Fisher, postgraduate film students Caroline Merz and Teresa Grimes (also a film-maker) and Elizabeth Bee, a lecturer in further education. Other women joined Cinewomen at certain times during the 10 years of its existence.

This was the time of an explosion in feminist work, which had a significant impact on cinema in terms of both film-making and film theory. The creation of the NWFW was encouraged by feminist theoretician and film-maker Laura Mulvey and followed a successful event called 'Women in Film' organised by Ginette Vincendeau in 1978. This led directly to the first Women's Film Weekend in 1979.

== Organisation and ethos ==
The NWFW was held at Cinema City in Norwich, England, over one three-day weekend each year (except in 1984). Cinewomen's aim was to make the festival as accessible to as many women as possible, both local (including UEA students) and from across the UK. Key to this aim were free accommodation, child-care and on-site food at cost price.

Primarily a festival that incorporated discussion sessions and live interviews, the NWFW placed the emphasis on screening as many themed film sessions as possible and less on conference-style debate. Screenings were introduced by a variety of speakers, often the film-maker/director, and a range of talks, exhibitions and discussions ran during the event.

== Aims and scope ==
From the beginning, the NWFW showed a range of significant films from European art cinema to British war documentaries, workshop and political film, avant-garde cinema and mainstream productions. However, one major theme was the examination of images of women. Recognising that cinema screens had been dominated by women as romantic figures or sex objects, the event aimed to show how women film-makers portrayed women's lives and elaborated on the feminist theme of 'the personal is political', with an accent on work, motherhood, sexuality and reclaiming the place of women in history.

The NWFW also aimed to re-appraise women's roles in film production by showing the work of classic directors such as Alice Guy, Dorothy Arzner, Germaine Dulac and Ida Lupino, and the output of then-neglected women who had worked in the British industry including Muriel Box, Wendy Toye, Kay Mander and Jill Craigie. All four of the latter came to the NWFW to discuss their films with the audience.

The festival also made a point of showing the works of contemporary women directors who re-cast history from a female perspective: Helma Sanders-Brahms, Pat Murphy, Claudia von Alemann and Margarethe von Trotta. Many of their films are now recognised as pioneering. Films by Chantal Akerman, Valie Export, Sally Potter, Margaret Tait, Tina Keane, Lis Rhodes, Yvonne Rainer, Catherine Breillat and Jan Oxenberg were all shown at the NWFW throughout the years. Also included was a distinctly militant brand of cinema which placed feminist struggles explicitly within terms of class as well as gender (referencing women's struggles including Greenham Common Women's Peace Camp and the Dagenham sewing machinists’ strike).

Another important strand of films addressed sexual and gender politics, as a growing awareness and acceptance of 'queer' (then called 'gay and lesbian') questions politicised many practitioners. Comedy in Six Unnatural Acts by Jan Oxenberg, screened at the event in 1979, is today recognised as a pioneering work in queer cinema. A burgeoning network of UK-wide film-making groups and collectives fed into the programming of the NWFW, with films made by the Berwick Street Collective, Leeds Animation Workshop, London Film-makers Co-op, Sheffield Film Co-op, Birmingham Film and Video Workshop, Cinema Action from South Wales, and Sprokettes from York. Members of feminist film distributors such as COW (Cinema of Women) and Circles were invited to speak. NWFW also offered an exhibition space where work by photographers including Jo Spence, Terry Dennett, and Marianne Majerus was displayed.

Lastly, and emanating more directly from academic film studies, was a strand which re-examined classical and contemporary Hollywood films to analyse their construction of strong female characters – for instance 1940s films noir such as The Reckless Moment (1949) directed by Max Ophuls. Similarly, the screening of The Student Nurses (1970), an exploitation film directed by Stephanie Rothman and produced by Roger Corman was inspired by the feminist film theorist Pam Cook’s review of the film that read it 'against the grain' and showed how, under the stereotypical representations of sexy 'bimbos', the film actually dealt with crucial women's issues such as abortion, while offering powerful female characters.

== Cinewomen ==
NWFW organisers 1979-1987 include: Elizabeth Bee, Pat Carter, Biddy Fisher, Teresa Grimes, Caroline Merz, Heba Saleh, Pat Treasure, Ginette Vincendeau.

Organisers 1987–1989 include: Mandy Cran, Biddy Fisher, Avril Goodwin, Alison Gumbley, Margaret O’Connor, Frances Tye, Claire Whiston, Sue Winston.

=== 2020 reunion ===
On 3 September 2020 the originators of the Norwich Women's Film Weekend (Elizabeth Bee, Biddy Fisher, Teresa Grimes, Caroline Merz and Ginette Vincendeau) were reunited for a virtual event, 'The Norwich Women's Film Weekend: reclaiming the history of a unique feminist event', as part of the art critic Jonathan P. Watts' public talks programme 'Of & By', hosted by Norwich-based arts organisation Assembly Online. The five Cinewomen reflected on the origins, the life and evolution of the annual NWFW some 30 years on. There was also an open discussion and a Q&A session with the participants, led by Watts.

== The event ==
=== 1st NWFW ===
October 26–28, 1979

The All Round Reduced Personality (Redupers), dir. Helke Sander (West Germany, 1977); The Student Nurses, dir. Stephanie Rothman (US, 1970); The Reckless Moment, dir. Max Ophüls (US, 1949); Mildred Pierce, dir. Michael Curtiz (US, 1945); Women at War (UK, 1942), Wings on Her Shoulder (Canada, 1945); Jane Brown Changes her Job, Ministry of Labour (UK, 1941); They Keep the Wheels Turning, Ministry of Labour (UK, 1942); They Also Serve, dir. Ruby Grierson (UK, 1940); The Nightcleaners Strike Part 1, Berwick Street Film Collective (UK, 1975); Shirin's Wedding, dir. Helma Sanders-Brahms (West Germany, 1976); Animation for Live Action, dir. Vera Neubauer (UK, 1978); Rapunzel Let Down Your Hair, dir. Susan Shapiro, Esther Ronay, Francine Winham (UK, 1978); Linda Beyond the Unexpected, dir. Audrey Summerhill, COW (UK, 1978); I Never Promised You a Happy Ending, dir. Maggie Seller, COW (UK, 1978); Taught To Be Girls, dir. Mari Peacock and Melanie Chait, COW (UK, 1979); Two Plus Two, dir. Caroline Sheldon (UK, 1974); Home Movie, dir. Jan Oxenberg (US, 1973); A Comedy in Six Unnatural Acts, dir. Jan Oxenberg (US, 1975); Lucía, dir. Humberto Solás (Cuba, 1969).

=== 2nd NWFW ===
October 17–18, 1980

Les Rendez-vous d'Anna, dir. Chantal Akerman (France/Belgium/West Germany, 1978); Nea (Young Emmanuelle), dir. Nelly Kaplan (France/West Germany, 1976); The Smiling Madame Beudet, dir. Germaine Dulac (France, 1922); Meshes of the Afternoon, dir. Maya Deren (US, 1943); At Land, dir. Maya Deren (US, 1944); Amy, dir. Laura Mulvey and Peter Wollen (UK, 1980); Christopher Strong, dir. Dorothy Arzner (US, 1933); With Babies and Banners, dir. Lorraine Gray, Women's Labour History Film Project (US, 1978); One Way or Another, dir. Sara Gómez (Cuba, 1977); Daughter Rite, dir. Michelle Citron (US, 1978); Working Title, dir. Teresa Grimes (UK, 1980); Sigmund Freud's Dora, dir. Anthony McCall and Claire Pajaczkowska (US, 1979); Thriller, dir. Sally Potter (UK, 1979); We Are Alive, dir. Women's Film Workshop UCLA/California Institute for Women (US, 1974); India Song, dir. Marguerite Duras (France, 1974).

=== 3rd NWFW ===
October 16–18, 1981

La Fiancée du Pirate, dir. Nelly Kaplan (France, 1969); Blind Spot (Die Reise nach Lyon), dir. Claudia von Alemann (West Germany, 1978/80); The Fall of the Romanov Dynasty, dir. Esther Schub (USSR, 1927); Triumph of the Will, dir. Leni Riefenstahl (Germany, 1934); Germany, Pale Mother, dir. Helma Sanders-Brahms (West Germany, 1979); A House Divided, dir. Alice Guy (US, 1913); The Blot, dir. Lois Weber (US, 1921); Rituals of Memory, dir. Pat Murphy (UK, 1979); Shadow of a Journey, dir. Tina Keane (UK, 1980); Maeve, dir. Pat Murphy and John Davies (UK, 1981); Outrage, dir. Ida Lupino (US, 1950); Merrily We Go to Hell, dir. Dorothy Arzner (US, 1932).

=== 4th NWFW ===
October 15–17, 1982

Invisible Adversaries, dir. Valie Export (Austria, 1977); Backland, Famous Five Films (UK, 1982); An Epic Poem, dir. Lezli-An Barrett (UK, 1982); So That You Can Live, Cinema Action (UK, 1981); Zechmeister, dir. Angela Summereder (Austria, 1982); Pictures on Pink Paper, dir. Lis Rhodes (UK, 1982); Here Comes the Bride, dir. Frances Bowyer (UK, 1982); A Question of Silence, dir. Marleen Gorris (Netherlands, 1982); Two German Sisters, dir. Margarethe von Trotta (West Germany, 1981); Nightshift, dir. Robina Rose (UK, 1981); Funny Valentine, dir. Maya Brandt (UK, 1979); Doll's Eye, dir. Jan Worth (UK, 1982).

=== 5th NWFW ===
April 13–15, 1983

Give Us a Smile, Leeds Animation Workshop (UK, 1983); Born in Flames, dir. Lizzie Borden (US, 1983); On Guard, dir. Susan Lambert (Australia, 1983); Serious Undertakings, dir. Helen Grace (Australia, 1982); The Good Cause Wimmin, dir. Penny Florence and Noe Mandelle (UK, 1983); The Hunger Years: In a Land of Plenty (Hungerjahre), dir. Jutta Brückner (West Germany, 1979/80); To Be a Woman, dir. Jill Craigie (UK, 1951); Blue Scar, dir. Jill Craigie (UK, 1948); A Question of Choice, Sheffield Film Co-op (UK, 1982); Entre Nous (Coupe de Foudre), dir. Diane Kurys (France, 1983); Red Skirts on Clydeside, Sheffield Film Cooperative (UK, 1983); Homes for the People, dir. Kay Mander (UK, 1945); The Gold Diggers, dir. Sally Potter (UK, 1983); Half a Life, dir. Christine Noll Brinckmann (West Germany, 1983); Toute une nuit, dir. Chantal Akerman (France/Belgium, 1982).

=== 6th NWFW ===
March 29–31, 1985

Fast Times at Ridgemont High, dir. Amy Heckerling (US, 1982); Peppermint Freedom, dir. Marianne Rosenbaum (West Germany, 1984); Women of Steel, Sheffield Film Cooperative (UK, 1984); A Sudden Wrench (BBC TV), writer: Paula Milne (UK, 1982); Class of 62 (ITV), dir. Marilyn Gaunt (UK, 1984); The Future of Emily, dir. Helma Sanders-Brahms (West Germany, 1984); Bitter Wages, dir. Audrey Droisen (UK, 1984); Street Corner, dir. Muriel Box (UK, 1953); Anne Devlin, dir. Pat Murphy (Ireland, 1984).

=== 7th NWFW ===
April 25–27, 1986

Desperately Seeking Susan, dir. Susan Seidelman (US, 1985); Pumping Iron II: The Women, dir. George Butler (US, 1984); Love Letters, dir. Amy Holden Jones (US, 1984); Binding Love, dir. Karin Ingham (UK, 1985); Dust, dir. Marion Hänsel (Belgium, 1985); All for Mary, dir. Wendy Toye (UK, 1955); I Be Done Been Was Is, dir. Debra J Robinson (US, 1984); Illusions, dir. Julie Dash (US, 1985); Our Marriage, dir. Valeria Sarmiento (France, 1985); Rue Cases-Nègres, dir. Euzhan Palcy (France, 1983).

Open Space in which contemporary film-makers screened work, no listings.

=== 8th NWFW ===
May 8–10, 1987

Rate It X, dir. Paula de Koenigsberg and Lucy Winer (US, 1985); Related Voices, dir. Sophie O’Neill (UK, 1986); The Cutting Edge, dir. Karen Ingham (UK, 1986); Springfield, dir. Emma Calder (UK, 1986); Madame Potatoe, dir. Emma Calder (UK, 1986); Men, dir. Doris Dörrie (West Germany, 1985); Home of the Brave, dir. Laurie Anderson (US, 1986); Working Girls, dir. Lizzie Borden (US, 1986); The Man Who Envied Women, dir. Yvonne Rainer (US, 1985); Girl Zone, Birmingham Film and Video Workshop (UK, 1986); Crops and Robbers, Leeds Animation Workshop (UK, 1986); Wonderful Women, dir. Betty Houlden and Sylvia Greenwood, Sheffield Film Cooperative (UK, 1987); Hour of the Star (A Hora da Estrela), dir. Suzana Amaral (Brazil, 1985); Golden Eighties, dir. Chantal Akerman (France/Belgium/Switzerland, 1986); The London Story, dir. Sally Potter (UK, 1986).

=== 9th NWFW ===
June 10–12, 1988

Making Mr. Right, dir. Susan Seidelman (US, 1987); Near Dark, dir. Kathryn Bigelow (US, 1987); Making Biscuit, dir. Sharon Laura (Australia, 1987); Damsels Be Damned, dir. Wendy Thompson (Australia, 1987); Colour Poems, dir. Margaret Tait (UK, 1974); Place of Work, dir. Margaret Tait (UK, 1976); Tailpiece, dir. Margaret Tait (UK, 1976); Aerial, dir. Margaret Tait (UK, 1974); Peel, dir. Jane Campion (Australia, 1982); Passionless Moments, dir. Jane Campion (Australia, 1984); A Girl's Own Story, dir. Jane Campion (Australia, 1984); Nice Coloured Girls, dir. Tracey Moffatt (Australia, 1987); My Life Without Steve, dir. Gillian Leahy (Australia, 1986); High Tide, dir. Gillian Armstrong (Australia, 1987); The Wheel, dir. Elisabeth Kozmian-Ledward (UK, 1988); Under the Gun: Democracy in Guatemala, dir. Patricia Goudvis (US, 1988); Passion, dir. Sylvia Chang (Hong Kong, 1986). Selection of short films by British independent film-makers including: Taking the Stage, dir. Noeleen Gratton; Video 28, dir. Video Vera; Uranium Hex, dir. Sandra Lahire; Gladis on the Underground, dir. Maya Brandt; Girls Night Out, dir. Joanna Quinn; Murders Most Foul, dir. Gillian Lacey; Dreaming Rivers, prod. Sankofa Workshop; Black Dog, dir. Alison de Vere.

=== 10th NWFW ===
May 26–28, 1989

Behind the Veil, dir. Ahmed A Jamal and Sabiha Sumar (Pakistan/UK, 1988); To Kill a Priest, dir. Agnieszka Holland (US/France, 1988); Coffee Coloured Children, dir. Ngozi Onwurah (UK, 1988); Best Wishes, dir. Ngozi Onwurah (UK, 1988); Needs Must When the Devil Drives (video on women's trade union history, no details); Salaam Bombay!, dir. Mira Nair (India/France/UK, 1988); Virgin, dir. Catherine Breillat (France, 1988); The Grass Was Deep, dir. Jennie Russell (UK, 1986); Diary for My Lovers, dir. Márta Mészáros (Hungary, 1987); Five Women Painters (C4), dir. Teresa Grimes (UK, 1988).
