= Carla Liss =

American artist (1944–2012)

Carla Liss (1944–2012) was an American visual and performance artist, and filmmaker and film actor. She was known for her associations with Fluxus and the London Film-Makers' Co-op.

== Early life ==
She was the daughter of the screenwriter and executive Abe Liss, who worked as a creative director for United Productions of America and later owned Elektra Film Production who made TV commercials Elektra was credited with "squeeze motion" technique of animation. Abe Liss was the producer for Elektra of Flavio (short, 1963) directed by Gordon Parks. He died on December 1, 1963, aged 47.

Carla Liss was born in Hollywood, California. She attended Sarah Lawrence College, the University of Wisconsin, and the Film School of Boston University.

== Underground films ==
In 1966 Liss appeared in the George Kuchar short film Leisure. She took part in work by Andy Meyer, and Tom Chomont's Ophelia. She was an actor in The Longest Most Meaningless Movie in the World (1970). She was in Normalsatz / Ordinary Sentence (1978–81) by Heinz Emigholz. Reynolds wrote:

There is little written on her ephemeral and responsive film practice, yet Liss's name can be traced through other, more feminist-inflected art networks from 1972 onwards.

Nathaniel Dorsky, a friend of both, documented Kuchar and Liss in his short memorial film August and After (2012). He knew Liss in New York, and later when she had a San Francisco apartment, and mentioned an affair she had with Felix Guattari.

=== The London Film-Makers Coop ===
An associate of Jonas Mekas of The Film-Makers' Cooperative in New York, Liss worked at the Film Maker's Cinematheque, in the 41st Street Theater. She traveled with him on European tours of the mid-1960s. She then was instrumental in bringing to London a major collection of New American Cinema works.

The London Film-Makers Coop (LFMC), founded in 1966, was initially heavily under the influence of Mekas, who asserted some sort of ownership of it as a "branch". From mid-1968 Liss was an intermediary in a deal that acquired for the LFMC much of P. Adams Sitney's traveling film collection, seen at British venues earlier that year.

Liss became the first full-time hire of the LFMC, in November 1968, her cinematheque experience being significant. She organised some showings of films at the Electric Cinema Club. The distribution channel through LFMC loans was later recognised for the part it played for developing a British audience for experimental film. The appointment was contentious, however, and brought to a head an internal schism in the LFMC. Opposed were a group associated with Better Books, including Bob Cobbing, Raymond Durgnat and Stephen Dwoskin, in sympathy with the Beats; supporting a change of direction to more emphasis on film-making were some members with art school backgrounds, the "Arts Lab" group including David Curtis who already knew Liss, Peter Gidal and Malcolm Le Grice. After an EGM in 1968 where the "Better Books" group lost out on the issue, Cobbing and others dropped out of the LFMC.

The Sitney collection films arrived in summer 1969. There had been a period of competition, with Birgit Hein in West Germany also strongly interested, with some agreement on sharing of catalogues. In the end London won out, offering a higher price. Summer 1969 also saw the LFMC move into the new Institute for Research in Art and Technology, on Hampstead Road in north London.

The new archive played a major role in the LFMC's library. Among other duties, Liss ran from it LFMC's film loan distribution, with Malcolm Le Grice. In 1969, too, there was a gift to LFMC of a collection of Fluxus films, given by Liss and Mekas. It was marked by a one-day FLUX event run by Liss.

In 1970 Liss married Nicholas Albery in London, as a marriage of convenience that allowed her to remain in the UK. The 1973 exhibition "Three Friends" at Gallery House, London, by Susan Hiller, Liss and Barbara Schwartz, was supposed to be followed by an open exhibition "Women's Work"; but the latter did not take place. "Three Friends" included experimental films.

== Fluxus ==
In 1968 Liss met George Maciunas in New York. In his "Fluxus: A Telescopic History", Peter Frank linked Liss to Jean Dupuy, as artists brought into Fluxus by direct contact with the "sage" Maciunas, within the context of minimalist art, rather than via the California Institute of the Arts which was a more common route for American recruits to the movement. Ken Friedman wrote in 1982:

She does not identify herself solely with Fluxus: she was a friend of Maciunas, and like many sometime Fluxus participants, whose engagement was primarily one of collegial affiliation and affection with one or another of the artists more clearly identified with Fluxus, her Fluxus work was restricted both to several specific projects and to a period of time now gone.

Writing in 2013 on female artists, Friedman's view was that "[...] Carla Liss, Alice Hutchins, Charlotte Moorman and others played key roles in Fluxus."

In 1971, Liss was involved in the "This is Not Here" exhibition at the Everson Museum, Syracuse, New York by Yoko Ono and John Lennon. She traveled with Maciunas on his vain 1972 attempt to buy a Greek island for Fluxus. For the itinerant Fluxshoe exhibition in England, October 1972 to August 1973, Liss was one of the artists giving live performances, with Ay-O, Eric Andersen, Takehisa Kosugi and Takako Saito.

After her London period, Liss had further involvement with Fluxus in the US. She performed at The Kitchen. She took part in the Flux Concert there on March 24, 1979, a retrospective of Fluxus performances from the past which was curated by Ken Friedman and Larry Miller. In April of that year, soon after the Three Mile Island accident, she showed "Secrets of Three Mile Island" there, a photographic installation.

Liss participated in the "Film as Installation" exhibition at MoMA PS1 in 1980. The following year, she had a solo show "Transparent Matters" there. In 1982, living in New York, she took part in the "Young Fluxus" exhibition hosted by Artists Space, her practice then being described as "water constructions and X-ray works".

== Journalism ==
In 1972 Liss, with Robin Page, interviewed George Brecht for Art and Artists magazine; this was in a specially-edited "Free Fluxus Now" issue. In 1973, for the same magazine, she with Lynne Tillman interviewed Meret Oppenheim. A further article there, in October 1973, involved Joan Jonas in conversation with Simone Forti. In this last article, Liss gave some concise autobiography, including "elope/divorce 1961" between two periods at the University of Wisconsin, going on the film school in Boston in 1962, and "video marriage of convenience becomes real marriage/separation".

In 1975, Liss was working on the Berkeley Barb, on the production side. On July 11 that year, she interviewed Ant Farm, through their fictional media person Uncle Buddie, about their July 4 performance "Media Burn".

== Works ==
Carla Liss was an author of the 1967 London Filmmakers Co-op Distribution Catalogue, with John Collins, Raymond Durgnat and David Curtis. In 1969 she created her SacramentFlux Kit. Her Travel Fluxkit had a box lid designed by George Maciaunas. These boxes were developed from the early 1960s by Maciunas, George Brecht and Robert Watts.

At the "Three Friends" 1973 exhibition, Liss showed the film Dovecote. On four screens, it simulated the interior of a stone tower.
