= Chris Welsby =

Canadian filmmaker and artist

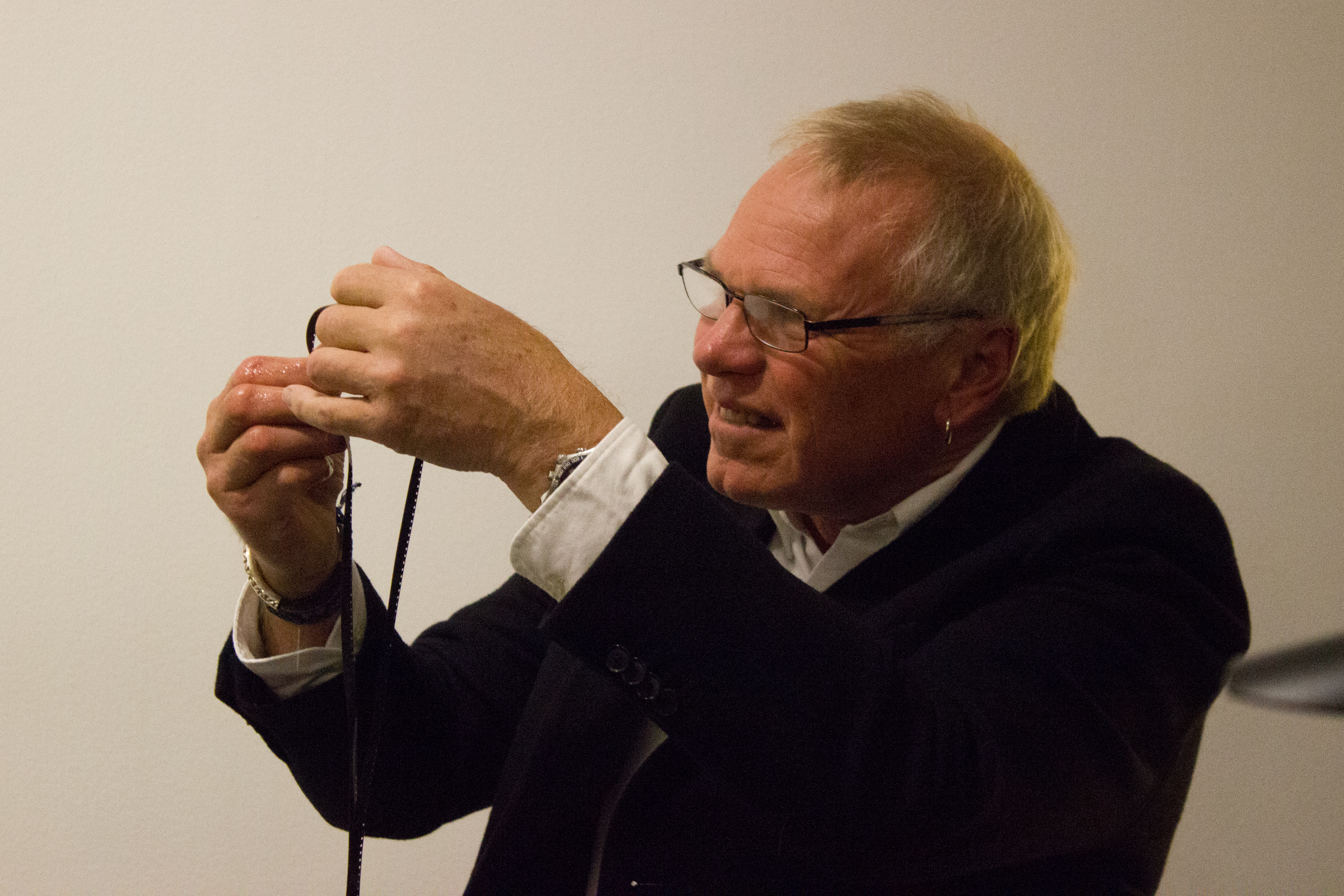
A portrait of Chris Welsby

Chris Welsby (born in 1948) is a Canadian experimental filmmaker, New Media and gallery installation artist. Born in the UK, in the 1970s Welsby was a member of the London Film-Makers' Co-op (now LUX film distributors), and co-founder of the Digital Media Studio (now Slade Centre for Electronic Media in Fine Art) at the Slade School of Fine Arts, UCL, London. He immigrated to Canada in 1989. He is considered one of the pioneers of expanded cinema and moving image installation and was one of the first artists to exhibit film installations at the Tate and Hayward galleries London. His expanded cinema works and installations have since continued to break new conceptual ground and attract critical attention. A. L. Reece, in British Film Institute's A History of Experimental Film and Video, wrote: "Twenty-five years ago, when he made his first projections for large spaces, film and art rarely met in the gallery; now it is common and installation art is a distinct practice."

== Life ==
Welsby was born in Exeter, UK. He is a graduate of the Chelsea College of Art and Design (BA (Fine Art)), where he trained as a painter from 1969 until 1973, and of the Slade School of Fine Art, University of London, where he encountered the ideas of Gregory Bateson and British cyberneticists, including Stafford Beer, Ross Ashby and Gordon Pask. Andrew Pickering's summary of the nature of this technical field indicates why it also of interest artists: "Second-order cybernetics ... seeks to recognize that the scientific observer is part of the system to be studied, and this in turn leads to a recognition that the observer is situated and sees the world from a certain perspective, rather than achieving a detached and omniscient 'view from nowhere'".

Welsby completed post-graduate studies at the Slade School in 1975 and joined the faculty in 1976, where he taught in all areas of art practice and was particularly responsible for Film and Video production and, together with Chris Briscoe, Juian O'Sullivan, Tim Head, Stuart Brisley, Liz Rhodes and Susan Hiller, was a co-founder of the Slade's Electronic Media Studio.

In 1972 he made his first films, Wind Vane and River Yar, and became a member of the London Film Maker's Co-op, where he encountered UK based Structural Materialist film theory of Peter Gidal and the expanded cinema performances of the Cinema Action Group. (Malcolm Le Grice, Jill Etherly, William Raban, Maralyn Halford and Annabel Nicholson* Since then, he has made twenty four films which have been screened at festivals, cinematheques and art galleries worldwide, and in more than 25 gallery installations and site- specific works.

In 1989, Welsby moved to Canada to take the position of Professor of Film and Digital Media at the School for the Contemporary Arts at Simon Fraser University in Vancouver. Welsby is also a member of ICICS (Institute for Computing, Information, and Cognitive Systems) at the University of British Columbia, Vancouver Canada. He retired from his full-time Academic duties in 2012 and now holds the position of [Professor Emeritus] at Simon Fraser University's Faculty of Arts Science and Communication. Welsby continues to travel widely, giving lecture presentations and exhibiting his films, videos and gallery installations. He lives on a small island on the Pacific Coast of Western Canada.

== Work ==
Working across a range of media, film, video and digital media and gallery Installations, Welsby's work has been mainly concerned with the problematic relationship between humans, human technology and the natural world. In Millennium Film Journal (1987), Peter Wollen wrote: "Welsby's work makes it possible to envisage a different kind of relationship between science and art, in which observation is separated from surveillance, and technology from domination."

He spent twenty years exploring ways to make films and gallery installations in which natural forces such as wind, tide, cloud cover and the rotation of the planet share creative control. In many of his films, the camera angles or framing are determined by the movement of the sun, wind or tides. In Seven Days (1974), for example, the motion of the camera, which is mounted on a motorized camera stand, followed the rotation of the earth while the in-camera editing responded to cloud cover governed by North Atlantic weather systems. In Chicago Film Reader (2001), Fred Camper observed: "In the 20-minute Seven Days (1974) Welsby finds his mature voice, offering a tour de force unlike anything cinema had yet seen."

In 1993, after he had moved to Vancouver, British Columbia, Welsby abandoned film and began making digital video installations such as At Sea, Waterfall and Lost Lake. Ian Christie (Professor of Film and Media History, Birkbeck, University of London), in Sight and Sound Magazine (2007) wrote: "Two recent installations by veteran English landscape filmmaker, Welsby (now based in Canada), showed how digital images can realise the ambitions once vested in 16mm to near-sublime perfection. Lost Lake #2 (2005) shows a shimmering virtual lake and the four-screen At Sea plays with our sense of the 'unchanging sea' by subtly shifting markers as the waves roll in."

Between 2004 and 2014 he worked with Vancouver-based artist and software programmer, Brady Marks, to create a number of projects which used custom software to power real-time, weather-driven, gallery installations that used weather data to edit and mix image and sound in real time. For example, In Tree Studies (exhibited at Gwangju Biennale, South Korea 2006), multiple viewpoints of a tree and a multi-channel sound track were edited together by weather data relayed, via the internet, from weather stations around the world.

For Welsby as a film maker, the difference between "landscape" and "weather", is of crucial esthetic significance: just as the cinema is a medium of movement, so the weather controls movement in nature. ...

...Welsby’s extraordinary originality lies in the way that he harnesses these natural effects (wind, cloud, rain, rotation of the planet etc.) to those of the cinema allowing one to enhance the other...

Welsby’s meditation on the esthetic revelation between man and nature, the environment and technology now gathers a new urgency as nature and the environment are increasingly contaminated by man and nature.

— Laura Mulvey, Chris Welsby DVD, British Film Institute, 2005

In 2007, Welsby, working again with Brady Marks, began to develop imaging software that generates a hybrid—neither a movie nor a still photograph, but a hybrid photographic image constructed over long periods of time. This began the ongoing Doomsday Clock project, which includes the three-year digital photograph Taking Time currently running at MIRE in the City of Nantes, France, as precursor to a project that includes the creation of a digital photograph that will take one hundred years to complete.

Welsby returned to making single channel video projects in 2015. Two works were completed during that year: Momentum (35min). and Entrance Island (17min), shot on a consumer-grade Canon SX 600 camera and edited using Final Cut Pro software. The pared down film making strategy is reminiscent of the low budget ethos of early London Film Makers Cooperative work, and enhanced by the flexibility and immediacy of widely available digital media, which allows artists to work directly in the landscape without the need for heavy equipment and a crew. Shot on a beach in Mexico, the films take consumer-grade digital camera technology to its limits and aim to blur the distinction between nature and technology in showing the dissolution of a derelict hotel that appears to be crumbling back into the earth.
