= Sarah Turner (filmmaker) =

Sarah Turner is a British artist, filmmaker, writer, curator and academic. Her moving image work is known for its preoccupation with form and its interplay between abstraction and narration.

== Education ==
Turner studied Fine Art, Film and Video at St Martin’s School of Art in the late eighties, followed by an MA at the Slade School of Fine Art.

== Career ==
=== Academic Work ===
Turner has lectured at the University of Kent since 2002, first as senior lecturer in film studies then was appointed director of fine art in 2012.

=== Film practice ===
Turner describes her work as "characterized by explorations of technologies, experimental approaches to writing and an engagement with experiences of narrative, immersion and embodiment within the long form film" with the governing aesthetic of "the space between abstraction and narration and working around affect"

Recent long form works have been supported by Film London Artists' Moving Image Network (FLAMIN) and Arts Council England.

==== Early interest in alternative media and storytelling ====
Turner has long been interested in storytelling methods and devices, and it was an interest in literature that originally propelled her interest in language: ideas expressed in time and space, which led to her work in film.

In 2004, she was the writer in residence at the University of York, and also the recipient of a grant from the Arts and Humanities Research Council in order to investigate and produce an ‘alternative to a script-based filmmaking practice through an innovative, location-based process that exploits the responsive potential of digital video technologies’.

Following this, she wrote an article concerning her own processes in developing Ecology (then titled The Mills) and the industry’s attitude to scriptwriting more generally, which has been archived by Central Saint Martin’s College of Art and Design’s British Artists' Film and Video Study Collection project.

For the Birds Eye View Film Festival 2008, Turner orchestrated an ‘innovative cinematic symphony of women's voices from around the world’ in an interactive mobile phone filmmaking project. The project invited participants to engage by making a quick film on a mobile phone, on the theme ‘overheated’. A live edit took place at the Institute of Contemporary Art with sound designer Annabelle Pangbourn. The completed project is available on the project’s site: overheatedsymphony.blogspot.co.uk.

==== Major works ====
===== Perestroika =====
Turner’s 2009 feature film Perestroika mixed 20-year-old Hi8 footage with animated recent digital stills, and was itself reworked for the 2013 film perestroika:reconstructed.

Unusually for a film noted for its challenges to its audience, Perestroika attracted the attention of mainstream film critics, from whom it received highly favourable coverage. Nigel Andrews of the Financial Times awarded four stars to ‘a travelogue with philosophical trimmings [which] turns into a puzzle picture worthy of Resnais or Antonioni’.

The film critic Peter Bradshaw writing in The Guardian described her 2009 work Perestroika, "challenging art film is a stream of consciousness memory-jogger".

It was the Sight and Sound Film of the Month, about which the critic Chris Darke wrote, "As physically immersive as anything you’re likely to see at a 3D multiplex, Perestroika sets its coolly minimalist structure against a visceral emotional tone to produce a work unlike any other in current British cinema."

Perhaps the reason for the appeal of Turner’s work outside the art world is that it pushes the boundaries of both film and politics. Perestroika has been noted by academics and critical thinkers for both its artistic form and commentary on environmental and social issues, most notably featuring in the essay volumes Performing Authorship: Self inscription and corporeality in the cinema and Screening Nature: Cinema Beyond the Human. For Cecilia Sayad, the film’s importance lies in its structures: its function in highlighting the act of authorship as performance, and how the film’s structural devices serve to emphasise the fictionality of narration, how the retelling, even of truth or fact, always and necessarily involves an element of creation and thus fiction. Sayad comments that whilst Perestroika ostensibly interweaves footage of a 2007–08 reconstruction of a train journey across Siberia that Turner took in 1987–88 with that from the original journey in what was then the USSR, it is as much about the workings of memory and filmmaking itself. But Sophie Mayer has commented on how the work uses the idea of pollution as a function of retention, and weaves it through both the social/cultural and natural worlds. Mayer goes further in exploring the contextual importance of the work, comparing Perestroika with works of the filmmakers Lucrecia Martel and Apichatpong Weerasethakul, commenting that each offers a ‘utopian possibility of a post-capitalist, post-industrial, postcolonial moment’. In a booklet of essays written to accompany the publication of Perestroika and perestroika:reconstructed in 2014, another academic, Paul Newland writes ‘the artist explores the nature of representation and its problematical relationship to our experience of reality. By doing this the film travels the branch lines between cinematography, photography, and everyday life.’

===== Public House =====
Public House, 96 mins, premiered in the Documentary competition, LFF 2015, nominated for the Grierson Awards. Public House was re-mastered in 2016 for wider audiences and toured UK cinemas and galleries throughout 2017. Writing for the BFI's Sight and Sound, critic Sophie Mayer commented “Its combination of the choreographic and choral offer a dazzlingly unique form in which to make the collective cinematic”.

==== Influences ====
As a student, Turner was mentored by the artists Tina Keane and Lis Rhodes. Like Rhodes, Turner was involved in the women’s film distributors, Circles and later Cinenova, where she had access to much early women’s and feminist moving image work. She has also stated that her influences include Black Audio Film Collective, Sankofa and Isaac Julien’s subsequent works.

=== Curatorial ===
In the early nineties, Turner curated for the Tate gallery, programmed the monthly avant garde showcase at the National Film Theatre (now BFI Southbank), and devised a touring programme of artists’ moving image work for the Arts Council of England ‘Hygiene and Hysteria: The body desired and the body debased’ in conjunction with fellow filmmaker Ian Iqbal Rashid, featuring such artists as Michael Brynntrup, Kayla Parker, John Grayson and Anna Thew.

In 1997 she co-curated the launch of the Lux Cinema in Hoxton, east London with artist and academic Jon Thomson. In the four month launch programme collaborations with communities and other art forms plus explorations into political and technological change featured heavily alongside original commissioned moving image works.

Since 2008, Turner has been a founding member of a curatorial group, Hysteriography, which is composed of British female filmmakers, writers and curators.

== Filmography ==
- She Wanted Green Lawns 4' (1989)
- One and the other time 5' (1990)
- A Tale Part Told 4' (1991)
- Sheller Shares her Secret 8' (1994)
- A Life in a Day with Helena Goldwater 25' (1996)
- CUT 18' (1999)
- London Birds Can’t Fly 11' (2003)
- Ecology (2007)
- Overheated Symphony 10' (2008)
- Perestroika (2009)
- This is not a Pier (2011)
- perestroika: reconstructed (2013)
- public house (2016)
