= NWFW =

NWFW may refer to:

- Norwich Women's Film Weekend, a two-day annual event that ran for 10 years, from 1979 to 1989
- Nuclear weapons free world, an imagined society with no nuclear weapons
