= Sandra Lahire =

British feminist filmmaker

- Born: 19 November 1950
- Died: 27 July 2001 (aged 50)

Sandra Lahire (19 November 1950 – 27 July 2001) was a central figure in the experimental feminist filmmaking that emerged in the UK in the 1970s and 1980s.

== Life and career ==
Lahire studied Philosophy at the University of Newcastle-upon-Tyne, (BA Hons) Fine Art Film and Video at St Martin's School of Art, London, (1984) and Film & Environmental Media at the Royal College of Art, London (MA 1986). It was at St Martin's that she entered the world of independent film, working with lecturers/film-makers and video artists including Malcolm Le Grice, William Raban, Anna Thew, Tina Keane and Vera Neubauer and studying alongside film-makers Richard Heslop, Martine Thoquenne and Isaac Julien.

Her poetic short films were made in the context of the London Film-Makers’ Co-operative in the 1980’s, which “developed a new form of mixed-genre film-making [….] which marked a new stage in experimental film in Britain”, according to Jacqueline Rose. Of this generation Rose has described Lahire as “one of the most gifted, innovative and bold experimental film-makers”.

Her first film, "Arrows", 1984, was a meditation on anorexia, a subject that threaded throughout her work. In 1986 she made ‘’Terminals’’, ‘’Edge’’, and ‘’Plutonium Blonde’’. Working alongside Arts Council/Channel 4 award winning film-makers Jean Matthee “Descent of a Seductress” (1987) and Anna Thew “Behind Closed Doors” (1987/8) at the London Film-makers Co-operative, Camden, and Four Corners film workshop, Bethnal Green, Sandra Lahire made ‘’Uranium Hex’’(1987), for Channel 4/Illuminations “Ghosts in the Machine” ‘’Serpent River’’,1989, explored the toxic effects of a uranium mining corporation, owned by Rio Tinto Zinc, on the residents and inhabitants of Serpent River and Elliot Lake in Ontario, Canada. In 1991 she made ‘’Lady Lazarus’’, the first part of a trilogy ‘’Living on Air’’, which was inspired by the poetry of Sylvia Plath and which she made across the span of nine years. The film incorporated an interview with Plath given just before she died. The lead of ‘’Living on Air’’ was played by fellow film-maker Sarah Turner. ‘’Eerie’’ followed in 1992. The second part of the Plath trilogy, ‘’Night Dances’’, 1995, presented Hebrew inscriptions on worn gravestones and allusions to Yom Kippur through which Lahire explored Jewish aspects of her identity. ‘’Persephone’’ and ‘’Knife Born’’ were made in 1997-98, with the final of the Plath trilogy, ‘’Johnny Panic’’, appearing in 1999.

Marina Grzinic has noted Lahire's “profound filmic commentary on anorexia. The body, always that body that is coming near the image of a spectre, that is connected solely with 'air and bones' while minimizing the flesh to zero, is also the primal element she uses to establish her relationship with her surroundings, particularly with a landscape destroyed by pollution or nuclear waste.” Grzinic also underscores the centrality of light and sound in her works, with which “she recreated emotional situations and connections between personal obsession(s) and social structures.”

An essay by Lahire, Lesbians in Media Education, appeared in the anthology Visibly Female: Feminism and Art, edited by Hilary Robinson in 1998. She also wrote an essay for Coil Magazine "The Fairies Banquet", 1999, on Sarah Pucill's film Swollen Stigma (1998) who was her fellow filmmaker and partner at the time. For Make Magazine Issue 7, which was a special issue on the Miniature 1999, she wrote an essay, 'Little Deaths', on her film Johnny Panic (1999) and Sarah Pucill's film Cast (1999).

Reflections on Lahire and her work by film-makers Sarah Pucill (who was her partner in the last 6 years of her life), Lis Rhodes (for whom Lahire wrote a score for her film Just About Now) and Sarah Turner appeared in Vertigo magazine in Spring 2002.

== See also ==
- Feminist art
