= Raymond Durgnat =

British film critic (1932–2002)

- Born: 1 September 1932; London, England
- Died: 19 May 2002 (aged 69); London, England
- Education: Pembroke College, Cambridge, Slade School of Fine Art
- Occupation: Film critic

Raymond Durgnat (1 September 1932 – 19 May 2002) was a British film critic. Born in London to Swiss parents, during his life Durgnat he wrote for virtually every major English language film publication. In 1965 he published the first major critical essay on Michael Powell, whom he described as hitherto "fashionably dismissed by critics as a 'technician's director.'"

His books include Films and Feelings (1967), A Mirror for England: British Movies from Austerity to Affluence (1970), and The Strange Case of Alfred Hitchcock (1974). He wrote principally for Films and Filming (in the 1960s), Film Comment (in the 1970s) and Monthly Film Bulletin (in the 1980s), and taught at various art schools and universities, notably St Martin's College and the Royal College of Art, where his students included Tony Scott. Towards the end of his life he was visiting professor at the University of East London.

== Biography ==
Durgnat was born in London in 1932 to Swiss parents who had immigrated to England in 1924. Durgnat's family was of French Huguenot descent, and he was raised in a religious Calvinist household. Durgnat's father worked as a window dresser but lost his job in 1932; afterwards, he opened a drapery shop.

He was educated at the Sir George Monoux School, a state grammar school in Walthamstow, before serving his statutory two years of National Service, which he spent in the Education Corps in Hong Kong, then a British possession. After leaving the army in 1954, he studied English literature at Pembroke College, Cambridge. With the filmmaker Don Levy, Durgnat became one of the first postgraduate students of film in Britain, studying under Thorold Dickinson (director of Gaslight and The Next of Kin) at the Slade School of Fine Art from 1960. The thesis he wrote there provided the source material for a number of his books.

In the early 1950s, he had written for Sight and Sound, but fell out with this British Film Institute publication after the exit of Gavin Lambert in 1957, often accusing it of elitism, puritanism, and upper-middle-class snobbery, notably in his 1963 essay "Standing Up For Jesus" (which appeared in the short-lived magazine Motion, which he co-edited with Ian Johnson) and in his 1965 piece "Auteurs and Dream Factories" (an edited version of which later appeared in Films and Feelings). From 1960, he was a regular presence in the monthly Films and Filming, writing reviews and serial essays.

During 1966 and 1967, Durgnat was a major player in the nascent London Film-Makers' Co-op (LFMC), then based at Better Books on Charing Cross Road, a hub of the emerging British underground. As the LFMC's chairman he was instrumental in promoting filmmakers such as Jeff Keen and Stephen Dwoskin, writing the first articles on both.

The rise of structural film (at the LFMC) and of structuralism (in the journal Screen) – and the far-left politics which accompanied the latter – saw Durgnat become an outsider figure within British film culture. In 1973 he moved to Canada, beginning a peripatetic teaching career in North America, which took him to New York, San Francisco and Los Angeles. In the late 1970s, he taught film at the University of California, San Diego alongside Manny Farber, Jean-Pierre Gorin and Jonathan Rosenbaum.

Returning to London at the close of the decade, he launched a series of withering assaults on the linguistics-based film theory that had come to dominate film academia over the previous decade; perhaps as a result, he did not publish another new book until 1999. He did, however, return to write for the BFI publication Monthly Film Bulletin in the years before its merger with Sight and Sound in 1991, and contributed to that publication again later in the 1990s.

His last two books, including A Long Hard look at Psycho, were also published by the BFI. The Essential Raymond Durgnat, edited by Henry K. Miller and published in 2014 – again by the BFI – contains previously unpublished work, including a translation of an essay originally published in Positif on Michael Powell, on whom Durgnat began but did not complete a full-length book. It also includes such rare pieces as "Standing Up for Jesus". The collection was described by Adrian Martin as "the essential film book of this or almost any year".

Durgnat's socio-political approach can best be described as "radical populist." He was strongly supportive of the working classes, and resultingly of American popular culture, and was dismissive of left-wing intellectuals, whom he accused of being petit-bourgeois conservatives in disguise. He was also dismissive of overt politicisation of film criticism, refusing to bring his own left-wing views into his writings on film.

== Bibliography ==
- Nouvelle Vague: The First Decade A Motion Monograph, London, 1963, 102 pages
- Greta Garbo Studio Vista/Dutton Pictureback, New York, 1965, reprinted 1967, 1970, 160 pages
- Eros in the Cinema Calder and Boyars, London, 1966, 207 pages
- Films and Feelings The MIT Press, Cambridge; Faber and Faber, London 1967, 288 pages
- Franju University of California Press, Berkeley, 1968, 144 pages
- Luis Buñuel University of California Press, Berkeley, 1968, 152 pages
- Children of Albion: Poetry of the "Underground" in Britain (poem: "Scrap Iron"), Penguin, Baltimore, 1969, 384 pages
- Samuel Fuller (essay "China Gate") Edinburgh Film Festival, Edinburgh, 1969, 128 pages
- The Films of Robert Bresson Praeger, New York, 1969, 144 pages
- The Crazy Mirror: Hollywood Comedy and the American Image Horizon Press, New York, 1970, 280 pages, ISBN 978-0-8180-0701-9
- A Mirror for England: British Movies From Austerity to Affluence Faber and Faber, London 1970, 394 pages, ISBN 978-1-84457-453-7
- Sexual Alienation in the Cinema: the dynamics of sexual freedom Studio Vista, London, 1972, 320 pages, ISBN 978-0-289-70261-1
- The Strange Case of Alfred Hitchcock The MIT Press, Cambridge; Faber and Faber, London 1974, 419 pages, ISBN 978-0-262-04041-9 / ISBN 978-0-571-09966-5
- Jean Renoir The University of California Press, Berkeley, 1974, 429 pages, ISBN 978-0-520-02283-6
- Durgnat on Film Faber and Faber, London, 1976, 238 pages, ISBN 978-0-571-10656-1
- Luis Buñuel University of California Press, Berkeley, 1977, 176 pages, ISBN 978-0-520-03424-2
- Michael Powell, Pressburger and Others BFI Publishing, London, 1978, 124 pages, ISBN 978-0-85170-086-1 (Essay in collection)
- King Vidor, American The University of California Press, Berkeley, 1988, 382 pages, ISBN 978-0-520-05798-2
- Michael Powell and English Genius Taylor & Francis Group, London, 1992, ISBN 978-0-415-03373-2
- WR: Mysteries of the Organism BFI Publishing, distributed by The University of California Press, Berkeley, 1999, 96 pages, ISBN 978-0-85170-720-4
- A Long Hard Look at "Psycho" BFI Publishing, distributed by The University of California Press, Berkeley, 2002, 248 pages, ISBN 978-0-85170-920-8
- The Essential Raymond Durgnat Palgrave Macmillan/BFI, 2014, 256 pages, ISBN 978-1-84457-451-3
