= International Women's Cinema Festival =

1986 feminist film festival in Poland

Women's Cinema Festival
- Location: Warsaw, Poland
- Founded: 1986

The International Women's Cinema Festival (Kino Kobiet) was the first international film showcase in Poland dedicated to films directed by women and portraying the world from a female perspective. It took place at the Kultura movie theatre in Warsaw, Poland, from February 21 to March 9, 1986. The event presented 60 feature, documentary and animated films made by women filmmakers from Poland and abroad.

== Background ==
The Women's Cinema Festival was initiated by an informal feminist women's group that was active since 1982. The group members, Maryla Ciechomska, Beata Fiszer, Ewa Franus, Barbara Młynarz (Pomorska), Jolanta Plakwicz, Dorota Roszkowska and Anna Siwek, were mostly students of Warsaw University. The festival was organised in cooperation with Roman Gutek, Sławomir Rogowski and Andrzej Wójtowicz from the "Hybrydy" Film Discussion Club (DKF "Hybrydy") at the Warsaw University Students' Club and the Feministisch Filmcollectief CINEMIEN from Amsterdam, with the financial support of the Polish Women's League (Liga Kobiet Polskich). It was the first and pioneer presentation in Poland of films made by women and an avant-garde film event which took place during the stagnation years of the time following martial law in Poland.

== Programme ==
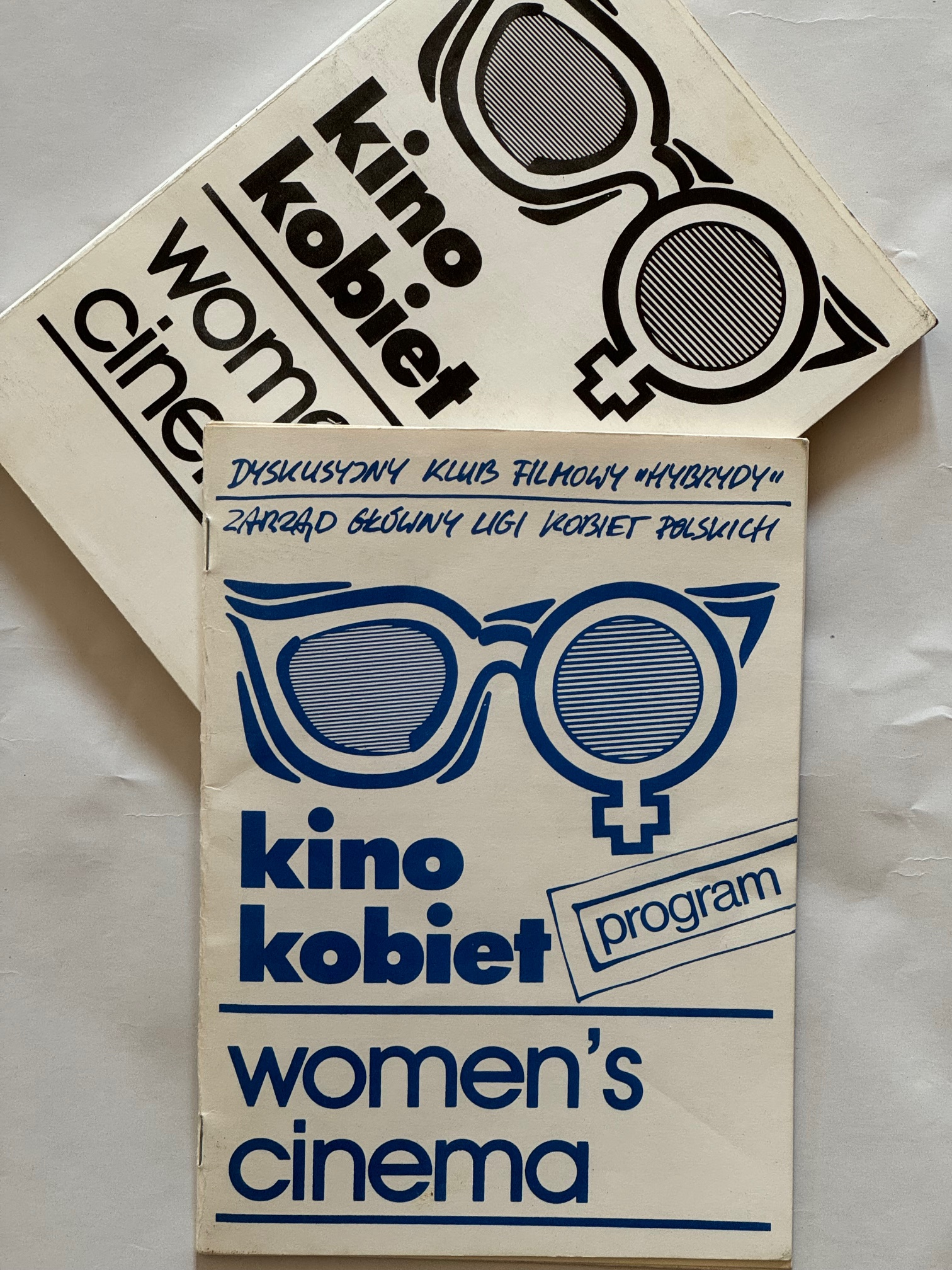
Programme and collection of texts of the Women's Cinema Festival, Warsaw 1986

The festival featured films from both Western countries and Eastern Europe, presenting a broad spectrum of subjects from a female perspective, from social and political issues to intimate portraits of women. The lineup included films that are now regarded as cult classics, such as Cléo from 5 to 7 directed by Agnès Varda, Daisies directed by Věra Chytilová and Chantal Akerman's Jeanne Dielman, 23 quai du Commerce, 1080 Bruxelles, which was screened in Poland for the first time during the event. The festival also presented Polish films such as Debiutantka, Krzyk and Dziewczęta z Nowolipek, directed by Barbara Sass, and Przez dotyk, directed by Magdalena Łazarkiewicz. The programme also included Aktorzy prowincjonalni by Agnieszka Holland.

== Festival guests ==
At the invitation of the organizers, filmmakers such as Ulrike Ottinger, Helke Sander, Marie-Geneviève Ripeau, Tonia Marketaki, Cornelia Schlingmann and Livia Gyarmathy came to Warsaw and participated in discussions with the audience, alongside representatives of the Sheffield Film Cooperative and the Cinemien Filmcollectief from Amsterdam. Polish filmmakers were represented by such directors as Barbara Sass and Magdalena Łazarkiewicz, as well as actors Grażyna Szapołowska and Maria Ciunelis. Post-screening discussions were moderated by Dorota Roszkowska.

== Significance ==
The film festival constituted the first such event in Poland showing films made by women, intentionally and deliberately presenting the "female gaze". It attracted strong interest within film and student circles. Numerous press publications accompanied the lively post-screening discussions. The event was considered as avant-garde during the bleak final years of the Polish People's Republic in the 1980s. It also provided momentum for the development of international festivals initiated at DKF Hybrydy, such as the Warsaw Film Week (which later evolved into the Warszawski Festiwal Filmowy) and then later the New Horizons Festival (Nowe Horyzonty). The "Women's Cinema" Festival helped introduce modern and progressive ideas into Polish culture about women making films. It was also the first feminist event in Poland.

The festival showcase sparked widespread discussions and was repeatedly reviewed and commented upon in the Polish press of the time, including articles published in Polish magazines Film., Ekran, Kino, Kultura, Tygodnik Kulturalny, Zwierciadło, Kobieta i Życie, as well as foreign magazines De Waarheid, Sonntag and Skrien
