= Susan Collins (disambiguation) =

Susan Collins is an American politician from Maine.

Susan Collins or Sue Collins may also refer to:

- Susan M. Collins (economist), American economist
- Susan Collins (artist) (born 1964), British artist
- Sue Collins, composer, see Grammy Award for Best Score Soundtrack for Visual Media
- Sue Collins (editor), see The Blood of Hussain
- Sue Collins (Irish actress), actress and comedian, founding member of The Nualas

== See also ==
- Suzanne Collins (disambiguation)
