= The Longest Most Meaningless Movie in the World =

1968 British underground film

- German poster
- Directed by: Vincent Patouillard
- Produced by: Tony Scott
- Release date: 1968
- Running time: 48 hours
- Countries: United Kingdom; France

The Longest Most Meaningless Movie in the World (also known as The Longest and Most Meaningless Movie in the World, The Most Meaningless Movie in the World and Meaningless Movies) is a 1968 British underground film lasting 48 hours directed by Vincent Patouillard. It was produced by Anthony Scott and created as a collaboration with French and British filmmakers in association with the Swiss Film Centre and the London Film-Makers' Co-op workshop (both located in London).

== Content ==
No actual footage was shot for the project, which instead consists entirely of outtakes, commercials, strips of undeveloped film, Academy leader, discarded reels recovered from Wardour Street dustbins, and other filmic cast-off material, creating a seemingly endless stream of news-reel and stock footage. Many segments are shown upside down, in reverse, or without sound. Some are shown many times over to wear out the viewer. At one point, a commercial starring Donald Campbell advertising a boys' adventure magazine is looped forty times, amounting to half an hour's worth of video. The film notably features Hermine Demoriane, Roger Dixon, Graham Stevens, Carla Liss and Martine Meringue. As British artist David Curtis has noted, the film had low production values and was screened in several iterations of increasing length.

== Release ==
The film was originally released in 1968 at the Arts Lab and the Cinémathèque Française, being one of the first films made by London Film-Makers' Co-op. It was subsequently aired at various locations within the next 2 years. At the time of its release it was the longest film made, but has since been superseded by other films; the current longest film ever made is Logistics.
