= Marina Vishmidt =

American writer (1976–2024)

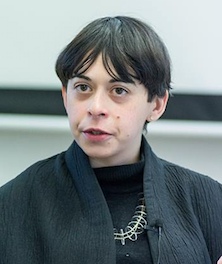
- Vishmidt in 2016
- Born: May 6, 1976; Kharkiv, Soviet Union
- Died: April 26, 2024 (aged 47); Vienna, Austria
- Occupation: Professor of Art Theory
- Spouse: Danny Hayward

Academic background
- Education: Queen Mary University of London
- Thesis: Speculation as a Mode of Production in Art and Capital (2012)
- Doctoral advisor: Peter Fleming; Stefano Harney

Academic work
- Discipline: Philosophy, Art Theory
- Institutions: Universität für angewandte Kunst Wien

Marina Vishmidt (May 6, 1976 – April 26, 2024) was an American writer, editor and critic. She lectured at the Centre for Cultural Studies at Goldsmiths, University of London in the MA program Culture Industry, and was Professor of Art Theory at The University of Applied Arts Vienna. Her research mainly concerned the relationship between art, value and labour. She further explored this through works on debt, social reproduction and artistic entrepreneurialism.

== Life ==
Vishmidt came to New York City with her mother and grandparents when she was three during the 1970s Soviet Union aliyah. She studied at the Bronx High School of Science and went to Sarah Lawrence College. In 2013, she completed her PhD entitled Speculation as a Mode of Production in Art and Capital at Queen Mary, University of London. In the Summer Semester, 2022, Vishmidt was the Arnheim Visiting Professor at the Institut für Kunst- und Bildgeschichte at the Humboldt-Universität zu Berlin. In October 2023 she started a new position as Professor for Art Theory at the University of Applied Arts Vienna. Vishmidt died on April 26, 2024 after living for five years with breast cancer.

== Writing ==
Vishmidt was a prolific writer whose bibliography includes many scores of texts in the fields of art theory, critical theory, feminist social reproduction theory, Marxism, philosophy and film. Her first book Reproducing Autonomy: Work, Money, Crisis and Contemporary Art (2016), written together with Kerstin Stakemeier, developed connections between the modernist aesthetic theory of Theodor Adorno and revolutionary feminist theory of the 1970s. Her 2018 monograph Speculation as a Mode of Production was praised for bringing "the full weight of critical theory – with its characteristic ambition of intellectual scope – ... to bear on art and politics in the age of financialisation".

Vishmidt's earliest texts emerged in the US underground zine culture of the early-to-mid 1990s. Retaining a commitment to DIY and collaborative modes of composition throughout her later life, her writing "often shunned the standard markers of intellectual property common to the academic and art institutionalisation of thought in favour of a million partnerships, some easy to point to and others less so". According to the art historian E. C. Feiss, "Marina’s work both cut through a masculinist art theory Left, caught in the intractable embrace of a Situationist-derived tactical imagination, and illuminated other histories that this version of an artist-subject-revolution couldn’t apprehend". In the spirit of this nonproprietorial attitude toward intellectual work, the majority of her writings are now freely available on the Memory of the World Marina Vishmidt Collected Works archive.

During the last decade of her life, Vishmidt was engaged in radicalising the conceptual art tradition of institutional critique under the heading of "infrastructural critique". As her collaborator Zoe Sutherland wrote, "While Marina remained compelled by the inherent reflexivity of institutional critique, she saw it as a recuperation of social struggles of the 1970s back into the art institution, producing a form of reflexivity that is ultimately too comfortable and contemplative". In 2026, a posthumous work was published by Verso under the title Infrastructural Critique: Contemporary Art between Reproduction and Abolition. Summarising the book, the philosopher Alberto Toscano writes that "Vishmidt ... demonstrates that 'critique as a material practice of antagonism' must eschew abstract radicalism to fight instead on the terrain of infrastructure, where value and waste, relations of production and relations of destruction, intersect."

== Collaborations ==
Vishmidt frequently collaborated with other artists and activists. One of her earliest collective projects after moving to London in the late 1990s was Cinenova, a London-based feminist film and video distributor. Cinenova's tribute page hosts a number of her early texts on feminist film.

During the 2010s and 2020s, Vishmidt's collective activities broadened to include collaborations with artists, critical theorists and poets, as well as various forms of workplace organising. She "wrote regularly with interlocutors Melanie Gilligan, Anthony Iles, Zoe Sutherland and Kerstin Stakemeier and developed writing, public talks and other collaborations with artists Ruth Buchanan, Caye Castagnetto, Melanie Gilligan, Em Hedditch, Blaise Kirschner, Karolin Meunier, David Panos, Grace Schwindt. Melissa Gordon, as well as her partner, poet Danny Hayward". She collaborated with the Full Unemployment Cinema, a collective which screened anti-work films in independent, self-organised venues around London, and in the early 2010s she was a participant in the London-based Feminist Reading Group, which focused on "Marxist feminism and a commitment to thinking reproduction against capitalist reproduction". According to the art historian Rose-Anne Gush, the Reading Group dealt with topics that were "already central to Marina's work in its insistent and continuous incisions into the naturalisation of reproductive labour, in which splitting it up, de- and re-contextualising it, and showing its social facticity, was the point."

As a theorist of collaboration and collectivity, "Marina remained committed ... to the idea that there is no individual without ‘a collective social context’ (Paolo Virno)". A persistent contributor to and supporter of magazine projects, "her own ‘collective social context’ was for many years a loose grouping of left publishing projects on the borderline between politics and art, like ... Mute, its Scottish twin Variant, the outputs of the gallery space-cum-commons Casco and the eponymous publication of the Russian art collective Chto Delat?." As the subtitle of her book Speculation as a Mode of Production suggests, Vishmidt thought that "the alternative to a collective context was what she called ‘value subjectivity’: non-speculative identity of subject and capital."
