= Dick McBride =

Dick McBride may refer to:

- Dick McBride (baseball)
- Dick McBride (poet)
