= Suzanne Collins (disambiguation) =

Suzanne Collins (born 1962) is an American television writer and novelist.

Suzanne Collins may also refer to:

- Suzanne Collins (actress) (born 1978), English actress
- Murder of Suzanne Marie Collins (1966–1985), American marine who was murdered

== See also ==
- Susan Collins (disambiguation)
