= Fay Godwin =

British photographer (1931–2005)

- Born: 17 February 1931; Berlin, Germany
- Died: 27 May 2005 (aged 74); Hastings, England
- Education: Self-taught
- Known for: Photography
- Notable work: Remains of Elmet (1979, with Ted Hughes); Land (1985, with John Fowles); Glassworks & Secret Lives (1999)
- Spouse: Tony Godwin (m. 1961; div. 1969)

Fay Godwin (17 February 1931 – 27 May 2005) was a British photographer known for her black-and-white landscapes of the British countryside and coast.

== Career ==
My way into photography was through family snaps in the mid-1960s. I had no formal training, but after the snaps came portraits, reportage, and finally, through my love of walking, landscape photography, all in black and white. A Fellowship with the National Museum of Photography in Bradford led to urban landscape in colour, and very personal close-up work in colour has followed.

— Fay Godwin, ca. 2000

Godwin was introduced to the London literary scene. She produced portraits of dozens of well-known writers, photographing almost every significant literary figure in 1970s and 1980s England, as well as numerous visiting foreign authors. Her subjects, typically photographed in the sitters' own homes, included Kingsley Amis, Saul Bellow, Angela Carter, Margaret Drabble, Günter Grass, Ted Hughes, Clive James, Philip Larkin, Doris Lessing, Robert Lowell, Edna O'Brien, Anthony Powell, Salman Rushdie, Jean Rhys, and Tom Stoppard.

After the publication of her first books—Rebecca the Lurcher (1973) and The Oldest Road: An Exploration of the Ridgeway (1975), co-authored with J.R.L. Anderson—she was a publisher, working mainly in the landscape tradition. The Oldest Road sold over 25,000 copies. Her work was informed by the sense of ecological crisis present in late 1970s and 1980s England.

In the 1990s she was offered a Fellowship at the National Museum of Photography, Film and Television (now the National Media Museum) in Bradford, which pushed her work in the direction of colour and urban documentary.

She also began taking close-ups of natural forms. A major exhibition of that work was toured by Warwick Arts Centre from 1995 to 1997; Godwin self-published a small book of that work in 1999, titled Glassworks & Secret Lives, which was distributed from a small local bookshop in her adopted hometown of Hastings in East Sussex.

== Published work ==
The first edition of Remains of Elmet: A Pennine Sequence, her book collaboration with poet Ted Hughes, was published by Rainbow Press in 1979. The book was also published in popular form by Faber and Faber (with poor reproduction of the images), and then re-published by them in 1994 simply as Elmet with a third of the book being new additional poems and photographs. Hughes called the 1994 Elmet the "definitive" edition. She also said, in a 2001 interview, that this was the book she would like to be most remembered for.

In an obituary for The Guardian, art critic Ian Jeffrey called her 1985 book Land, the "book for which she will be most remembered", and described it:

Designed by Ken Garland, it is stylish in the classic mode, but what sets Land apart is the care that Fay gave to the combining and sequencing of its pictures. Working with contact prints on a board, she put together a picture of Britain as ancient terrain—stony, windswept and generally worn down by the elements....[a work] in the neo-romantic tradition...[that] gives an oddly desolate account of Britain, as if reporting on a long abandoned country.

Godwin's last major retrospective was at the Barbican Centre, London in 2001. A retrospective book, Landmarks, was published by Dewi Lewis in 2002.

== Awards and recognition ==
Godwin was the subject of a documentary, broadcast on The South Bank Show on 9 November 1986.

She was awarded an honorary fellowship of the Royal Photographic Society in 1990 and had a major retrospective at the Barbican Centre in London in 2001.

== Personal life ==
Godwin was born Fay Simmonds in Berlin, Germany, the daughter of Sidney Simmonds, a British diplomat, and Stella MacLean, an American artist. She attended nine different schools before beginning a career as a travel representative. She moved to London in the 1950s. She married publisher Tony Godwin in 1961; the couple had two sons, Jeremy and Nicholas. They split up in 1969 and later divorced.

Godwin was less active in her final years; in a December 2004 interview for Practical Photography, she blamed "the NHS. They ruined my life by using some drugs with adverse affects [sic] that wrecked my heart. The result is that I haven't the energy to walk very far."

Godwin died on 27 May 2005, in Hastings, England at the age of 74. After her death, the Ramblers' Association, an organisation led by Godwin from 1987 to 1990, described her presidency as a time when its "long-running right-to-roam campaign was turned up to the full-strength pressure which ultimately resulted in the access provisions enshrined in the Countryside and Rights of Way Act 2000 and the Land Reform (Scotland) Act 2003."

Godwin's archive, including approximately 11,000 exhibition prints, the entire contents of her studio, and correspondence with some of her subjects, was given to the British Library.

== Publications ==
- Rebecca the Lurcher. Barrie & Jenkins 1973. With Andrew Simpson..
- The Oldest Road: An Exploration of the Ridgeway. 1975. With J.R.L. Anderson.
- Remains of Elmet. Rainbow Press, 1979. With poems by Ted Hughes.
  - Remains of Elmet. Faber and Faber, 1979. ISBN 9780571278763.
  - Elmet. Faber and Faber, 1994. With new additional poems and photographs.
  - Remains of Elmet. Faber and Faber, 2011. ISBN 9780571278763.
- The Saxon Shore Way. Hutchinson (publisher), 1983. With Alan Sillitoe. ISBN 0091514606.
- Land. Heinemann, 1985. With John Fowles. ISBN 0434303054.
- Glassworks & Secret Lives. Stella Press 1999. ISBN 0953454517.
- Landmarks: A Survey Dewi Lewis, 2001. ISBN 1-899235-73-6. With an introduction by Simon Armitage and an essay by Roger Taylor.
- Our Forbidden Land. Jonathan Cape 1990.
- Islands. Jonathan Cape 1978. With John Fowles.
- The Secret Forest of Dean, Redcliffe Press 1986.
- Glassworks and Secret Lives, Stella Press 1999. With Ian Jeffrey.
- Bison at Chalk Farm. Routledge & Kegan Paul 1982.
- Romney Marsh and the Royal Military Canal. Wildwood House 1980. With Richard Ingrams.
- The Whisky Roads of Scotland. Norman & Hobhouse 1982. With Derek Cooper.
- The Edge of the Land, Jonathan Cape 1995.
- The Oldest Road, an exploration of the Ridgeway. Whitlett Books 1987. With J.R.L. Anderson.
- Thorne Moors. Sumach Press 1991. With Catherine Caufield.
- The Drovers' Roads of Wales. Wildwood House 1977. With Shirley Toulson.
- This Scepter'd Isle, Shakespeare in Praise of Britaiin. Souvenir Press 1989.
- The Countryside we want: A manifesto for the year 2000. Green Books.1987.
- Wessex: A National Trust Book, Hamish Hamilton 1985. With Patricia Beer,
- Tess the story of a Guide Dog, Gollancz 1981 With Peter Purves.
- Oil Rush. Quartet Books 1976. With Mervyn Jones.
