= Ginette Vincendeau =

British-French film critic

- Born: 1948 (age 77–78)
- Occupations: Academic, writer, film critic
- Years active: 1977–present

Ginette Vincendeau (born 1948) is a French-born British-based academic who is a professor of film studies at King's College London.

== Early life and education ==
Vincendeau was educated at the Lycée Lamartine and Lycée Sophie Germain in Paris, and the University of Paris III: Sorbonne Nouvelle, gaining a degree in English language and literature. She taught French in schools in the UK and at the University of East Anglia, before completing a doctorate in film studies, supervised by Thomas Elsaesser.

== Career ==
While in Norwich, she initiated and co-organised the Norwich Women’s Film Weekend. Before assuming her post at King's, Vincendeau was Professor of Film Studies at University of Warwick.

Vincendeau is a regular contributor to Sight & Sound magazine and the feminist site le genre et l’écran. She contributes essays to many DVDs of French films, in particular for Arrow Films, BFI and The Criterion Collection. She has written widely about European, and especially French cinema, specialising in popular genres and stars. In 1998, she was awarded the title of Chevalier de l’Ordre des Arts et des Lettres by the French Ministry of Culture, for services to French culture. She is currently co-chief general editor of the journal French Screen Studies. She has been called one of the "key figures within the field who have been leaders in research and teaching of French cinema".

== Publications ==
=== Monographs ===
Sources:

- Anatomie d’un mythe: Jean Gabin (with Claude Gauteur), Paris: Nathan, 1993, 225 pp. Re-edited in 2006.
- The Companion to French Cinema, London: Cassell/BFI, 1996, 202 pp.
- Pépé le Moko, BFI Film Classics, London: BFI, 1998, 78 pp.
- Stars and Stardom in French Cinema, London and New York: Continuum, 2000, 275 pp. Reprinted in 2005.
- Jean-Pierre Melville, 'An American in Paris', London: BFI, 2003, 278 pp.
- La Haine, London: I.B. Tauris, 2005, 118 pp.
- Les stars et le star-système en France, Paris: L’Harmattan, 2008 (updated and enlarged French edition of Stars and Stardom in French Cinema).
- Brigitte Bardot, London: Palgrave/Macmillan, 2013.
- Brigitte Bardot, The Life, The Films, The Legend, London: Carlton, 2014 (published in French as Brigitte Bardot, Paris: Gründ, 2014).

=== Edited and co-edited books ===
Sources:

- City Cinemas, Norwich: Cinema City, 1978.
- Les Cinéastes allemands en France, les années 30 (with Thomas Elsaesser), Paris: Institut Goethe, 1982, 29 pp.
- La Vie est à nous! French Cinema of the Popular Front 1935-38 (with Keith Reader), London: BFI, 1986, 109 pp.
- French Film, Texts and Contexts (with Susan Hayward), London and New York: Routledge, 1990, 309 pp. Selected for “Outstanding Academic List”, Choice, May 1991.
- Popular European Cinema (with Richard Dyer), London and New York: Routledge, 1992, 270 pp.
- 20 ans de théories féministes sur le cinéma, Grande-Bretagne et Etats-Unis (with Bérénice Reynaud), CinémAction 67, CinémAction- Corlet, 1993, 200 pp.
- The Encyclopedia of European Cinema, London: Cassell/BFI, 1995, 475 pp.
- French Film, Texts and Contexts (with Susan Hayward); Second Edition (revised and expanded), London and New York: Routledge, 2000, 348 pp.
- Film/Literature/Heritage, A "Sight and Sound" Reader, London: BFI, 2001, 300 pp.
- Journeys of Desire, European Actors in Hollywood (co-edited with Alastair Phillips), London: BFI, 2006.
- The French New Wave, Critical Landmarks (co-edited with Peter Graham), London: BFI, 2009.
- A Companion to Jean Renoir (co-edited with Alastair Phillips), Wiley-Blackwell: 2013.
- Paris in the Cinema: Beyond the Flâneur (co-edited with Alastair Phillips), London: BFI/Palgrave-Macmillan, 2017.
