= Alice Hutchins =

American sculptor (1916–2009)

- Born: November 4, 1916; Van Nuys, California
- Died: October 25, 2009 (aged 92)
- Known for: Sculpture
- Movement: Fluxus

Alice Louise Hutchins (November 4, 1916 – October 25, 2009) was an American sculptor known for her metal assemblages and constructs. She incorporated magnets into many works, and interactive participation by the viewer is also a core component of many of her sculptures.

== Biography ==
Hutchins was born Alice Williamson, one of three siblings, in Van Nuys, California in 1916. She was raised in Chico. In a 2005 interview, she recalled being an imaginative and curious child:

As a child, I wanted to go to China and have adventures. But I wanted to experience life. I wanted to find my own way. I loved the unknown. I wanted to get out of Chico.”

She attended University of California at Berkeley, before dropping out to marry a lawyer whose career took them to over a dozen cities, including Cairo and Paris. It was in Paris that Hutchins discovered her affinity for art.

== Career ==
Hutchins began her artistic career in Paris, where she lived between 1950 and 1980. In 1957 she began formal training under the painter and later filmmaker Robert Lapoujade. Between 1957 and 1967 her painting moved from figurative to abstraction, as the performative nature of painting became her focus. Critical to her artistic development was her inclusion in a group of French avant-garde artists, musicians, and poets in Paris in the 1960s. Hutchins, the only American, attended weekly salon gatherings organized by champagne heir and sound-poet Bernard Heidsieck and his artist wife Francoise Janicot, where she met many international artists passing through Paris.

In the mid 60s she began looking for a new art form, having grown dissatisfied with painting. She experimented with “retailoring” postcards from the Louvre. Weary of iconic paintings she sought to modernize them, just as she did her self-portrait of 1966, by applying letraset. In 1967 Hutchins discovered the power of the magnet and began making three-dimensional works. Hutchins was strongly influenced by the Fluxus art movement.

Told by the French art critic Pierre Schneider that her new work would be better received in the US, Hutchins flew to New York in 1967 with her first magnetic works. She gravitated to the artists’ enclave eventually known as Soho where she was invited to set up a NY studio in a “fluxhouse” organized by George Maciunas. Dividing time between studios in Paris and New York, she discovered new sources for magnets. Her early metal work was in multiples, favoring accessibility over exclusivity. These were first sold in 1967, unsigned and unnumbered at ‘Multiples,’ the Marian Goodman Gallery on Madison Avenue. She soon abandoned a promising painting career to devote her full attention to transformable metal assemblages and finally constructs using permanent industrial magnets. The artist has said about her experimental work, “It began in the liberating years of the 60s when change was in the air. I had grown dissatisfied with painting. It was for the limited few. I was looking for another form of communication, something that could be more easily understood and enjoyed. I found it with magnets.”

Throughout the 1970s - 1990s, Hutchins regularly exhibited throughout the United States and abroad, in both solo and group exhibitions.

One of her final exhibits was during July and August 2009 at the D'Amelio Terras gallery in New York City, which featured a retrospective of her works in wood and metal. The interactive component of her sculptures is characteristic. Hutchins' works "change shape from show to show, and can even be reassembled by viewers (by request and with assistance from gallery staff )". In 2005, she had a joint exhibition with her sister, artist Claudia Steel, in Chico.

Hutchins donated her papers to the University of Iowa Libraries.

Her work is currently in public and private collections worldwide, including, among others, the following museum collections:

- Museum of Art and Design (New York City)
- Berkeley Art Museum, University of California Berkeley, Berkeley, California
- Fogg Art Museum, Harvard University, Barbara and Peter Moore Fluxus Collection, Cambridge, Massachusetts
- Getty Center for the History of Art and the Humanities, Jean Brown Collection, Santa Monica, California
- La Societé des Amis du Centre National de l'Art Contemporain, Centre Georges Pompidou, Paris, France
- Musée d'Art Contemporain de Lyon, Lyon, France
- Museum of Contemporary Art, Françesco Conz Collection, Zagreb, Croatia
- Santa Barbara Museum of Art, Santa Barbara, California
- Staatsgalerie Archiv Sohm, Stuttgart, Germany
- Tate Modern, Fluxshoe Archive, London
- Walker Art Center, Minneapolis, Minnesota
- Museum of Northern California Art, Chico, California

== Selected exhibits ==
- Fluxus, Tate Modern, London, 2000
- Fluxbritannica: Aspects of the Fluxus Movement, 1962–73, Tate Modern, London, 1994
- Venice Biennale, 1990
- "Improvisation", March 18 - April 20, 1988, Redding Museum and Art Center

== See also ==
- Fluxus
