= Dick McBride (poet) =

American poet

- Born: May 8, 1928; Washington, Indiana, United States
- Died: August 28, 2012 (aged 84); Colwall, Herefordshire, England
- Occupations: Poet; playwright; novelist; publisher; independent book distributor
- Writing career
- Period: 1960–2012
- Literary movement: San Francisco Renaissance, Beat
- Website: www.dickmcbride.co.uk

Richard William McBride (May 8, 1928 – August 28, 2012) was an American beat poet, playwright and novelist. He worked at City Lights Booksellers & Publishers from 1954 to 1969.

== Life ==
Born in Washington, Indiana, McBride spent years traveling around Milwaukee, Wisconsin, Kentucky and Nebraska working in radio, before moving to San Francisco, in the early 1950s.

Kenneth Patchen introduced him to Lawrence Ferlinghetti, who offered him a job as store manager at the City Lights Bookstore. He worked at City Lights for 16 years and became friends with Allen Ginsberg, Lawrence Ferlinghetti and several other Beat Generation writers.

In 1964, McBride moved to the United Kingdom for six months to help "bohemianize" Better Books in London for Tony Godwin.

In 1967, City Lights moved their publishing operation to 1562 Grant Avenue, McBride ran this part of the business with his brother Bob McBride and Martin Broadley for several years.

He returned to England in 1969, where he worked as the director of independent book distributors McBride Bros. and Broadley, selling books in England and to the Continent.

In the summer of 1973, McBride and Bernard Stone hosted a "Fourth of July Party" for Allen Ginsberg at the Turret Bookshop, London. Ginsberg's Fall of America had been published earlier that year, and it seemed appropriate to hold a reading on the birthday of American Independence. The party is commemorated in his biography of Ginsberg, Cometh With Clouds (Cherry Valley Editions 1982).

Then during the 1980s, McBride moved on to Australia. In 1988, he returned to the UK and settled in West Malvern, Worcestershire.

In November 1996, he was a guest at the Conegliano Poetry Festival, where he read his poetry alongside Yevgeny Yevtushenko, Andrey Voznesensky and Roger McGough. The festival was organised to honour City Lights and the Beats and to celebrate Allen Ginsberg's 70th birthday

In 2001 he collaborated with Celluloid on the "Last Beat" project, a live and recorded performance project that received airplay on BBC Radio 3's Late Junction. A UK tour followed, including a performance at the Birmingham ArtsFest.

In 2006 he headlined the "Words In Motion" stage at the Big Chill Festival at Eastnor Castle.

In January, 2009 McBride appeared at "The British Beat" event as part of the "Back On the Road" exhibition at the Barber Institute of Fine Arts, Birmingham. The exhibition featured the original manuscript scroll of Jack Kerouac's On the Road. The event was curated by Professor Dick Ellis, Head of American and Canadian Studies at Birmingham University, and also featured readings by Jim Burns, Ian McMillan, David Tipton and Camelia Ellias.

McBride lived in Colwall, Herefordshire, where he continued to write and perform until his death in August 2012, aged 84.

== Literary career ==
McBride's first collection of poetry, Oranges, was published in 1960 by Wilder Bentley at the Bread and Wine Press in San Francisco, California. It was illustrated with woodcuts by the artist and actor, Victor Wong. The Bread and Wine Mission was started by Pierre Delattre and was home to Bob Kaufman's magazine Beatitude.

Ballads of Blood was published in 1961 by the Golden Mountain Press, San Francisco.

McBride's first book, Lonely the Autumn Bird: Two Novels, was published by Alan Swallow in 1963. It consists of two short novels: the title novel Lonely the Autumn Bird and Tilt.

In 1966, his second novel, Memoirs of a Natural-Born Expatriate, was published by Alan Swallow. It tells the story of a man who (like the author) works at City Lights Bookstore.

In 1982, Charles Plymell's Cherry Valley Editions published Cometh With Clouds a short biography of Allen Ginsberg. It contains a foreword by Lawrence Ferlinghetti.

Jacqui – Love Poems was privately produced in 1994. The second edition was published by McBride's Books in 1997 and is dedicated to his second wife, Jacqui.

McBride's third novel, The Astonished I (Memories & Wet Dreams) was published by McBride's Books in 1995. It is a recollection of the authors time in San Francisco. It is dedicated to his friend Tim Prael and contains an introduction by Charles Plymell.

The first chapter of the book recalls a conversation with Jack Kerouac, who had phoned City Lights to talk to Ferlinghetti about publishing Visions of Cody. A slightly different version of the first chapter was originally published in Transit and then The Beat Journals, both published by Kevin Ring's Beat Scene Press.

The second chapter of The Astonished I describes the first reading of "Thou Shalt Not Kill" (a lament for the death of Dylan Thomas) by Kenneth Rexroth at the Cellar in Green Street, San Francisco.

His most recent collection of poetry, Remembered America: Poems by Dick McBride, was published by Rue Bella in 2004.

== Influences ==
McBride was strongly influenced by Kenneth Patchen, who introduced him to the work of Giono, Celine, Proust, Nathanael West and William Saroyan.

== Musical collaborations and recordings ==
- In 2000-2001 Dick McBride collaborated with Celluloid on the “Last Beat” project, a live and recorded project that received airplay on BBC Radio 3's Late Junction.
- In 2008, Charlie Stewart produced Upbeat & Groovy: Dick McBride reads poems 1960-2008, a recording of Dick McBride reading his poetry at his home in Colwall, Herefordshire. The recording was limited to 150 copies.

== Bibliography ==
=== Prose ===
- Haircut Dream (City Lights Journal: Number One, Published by City Lights Books, 1963)
- Lonely the Autumn Bird; Two Novels (A Swallow Paperbook, 1963)
- Memoirs of a Natural-Born Expatriate (Alan Swallow, 1966)
- Cometh with Clouds: Memory, Allen Ginsberg (Cherry Valley Editions, 1982) ISBN 0-916156-54-0
- The Astonished I (Memories & Wet Dreams) (McBride's Books,1995) ISBN 0-9527136-0-8
- The Garden (Annihilator Press, 1999)
- Allen Ginsberg & the Blue Rinse Brigade (Urthona, 2001)
- Behan & The Beats (Appliance Books, 2005)
- Macho Ovum

=== Poetry ===
- Oranges – Illustrated by Victor Wong (Handset and printed at the Bread & Wine Press, San Francisco, by Wilder Bentley, 1960)
- Ballads of Blood (Golden Mountain Press, 1961)
- Jacqui – Love Poems (McBride's Books, 1994) ISBN 0-9527136-1-6
- Remembered America: Poems by Dick McBride Volume 1 (Rue Bella, 2004) ISBN 0-9536710-9-7

=== Plays ===
- From Out The Whale's Mouth
- Unnecessary Miracle
- Devils In A Quandary
- There And Where

=== Anthologies ===
- Beat Voices: An Anthology of Beat Poetry ed. David Kherdian (Beech Tree Books, 1996) ISBN 0-688-14916-2
