= Museum of Northern California Art =

Art museum in Chico, California, U.S.

- Logo

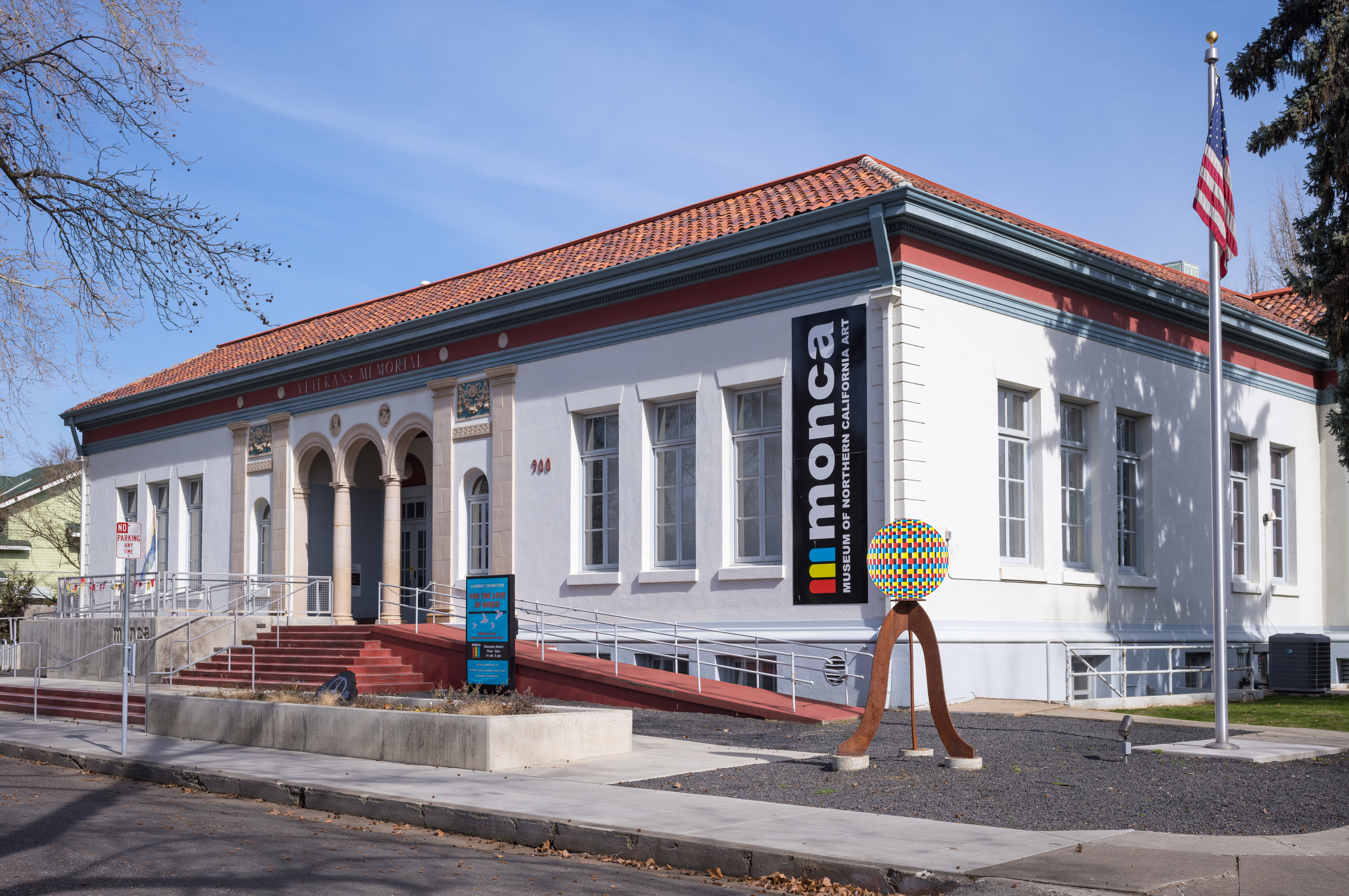
- The museum's exterior in 2023
- Coordinates: 39.73667°N 121.84423°W
- Executive director: Pat Macias
- Website: monca.org

The Museum of Northern California Art (MONCA) is an art museum in Chico, California, United States. The museum is housed in the Veterans Memorial Hall building on the Esplanade.

== Description and history ==
Established in 2011, the museum has been at its current location since 2017. MONCA's logo features arches in the three primary colors red, yellow, and blue. To commemorate its fifth anniversary, the museum featured an exhibit highlighting these three colors. Other exhibits have included Tales of the Tattoo (2022) and For the Love of Birds (2023). In 2022, MONCA displayed 21 orange shirts to commemorate victims of the Robb Elementary School shooting, which occurred in Uvalde, Texas. The museum also hosted a Queer Art Show, presented by Chico's Stonewall Alliance for Pride Month.

=== Leadership ===
In 2020, the museum's first board president Pat Macias was named executive director. Roger Steel replaced Macias as president of the board of directors.
