= Slade Centre for Electronic Media in Fine Art =

Division of University College London

Coordinates: 51.5233°N 0.1303°W

The Slade Centre for Electronic Media in Fine Art (SCEMFA) opened in 1995 at the Slade School of Fine Art, University College London. The centre provides opportunities for research into electronic media and fine art with the goal of contributing to debate on national and international levels.

== History ==
The Slade School of Fine Art had previously been home to Malcolm Hughes's Computer and Experimental Department in the 1970s.

== Events and exhibitions ==
In 1997 SCEMFA presented Collision, a public lecture series by artists, writers, and curators working with interactivity, telematics, and digital works. This exhibition was followed by Spontaneous Reaction, a week-long seminar funded by the Arts Council, which took a critical look at interactivity with participants from a variety of disciplines, including psychology, architecture, and computer science.

Throughout 1998, SCEMFA collaborated with Channel 4 UK to organise Cached, a monthly event held at the Institute of Contemporary Arts, London. Funded by the Arts Council, this series investigated the conceptual and practical issues of producing art for the internet through a series of artists presentations.

== See also ==
- Martin John Callanan
- Susan Alexis Collins
