= Tina Keane =

British artist (born 1940)

- Born: 1940 (age 85–86)
- Education: Hammersmith College of Art; Sir John Cass School of Art; London College of Printing (MA)
- Known for: Film and performance art
- Awards: Paul Hamlyn Foundation Award

Tina Keane (born 1940) is a British artist who has worked with film, video, digital media, and performance, and been a forerunner of multimedia art in the UK. Reflecting a feminist perspective, her works have often explored gender roles, sexuality, and political concerns.

== Early life and education ==
Keane studied at the Hammersmith College of Art, then the Sir John Cass School of Art (1967–70). From 1995-96, she studied for an MA in Independent Film and Video from the London College of Printing. She was a founder member of the non-profit women’s film distribution organisation Circles - Women in Distribution. Keane also curated and programmed exhibitions and screenings including The New Pluralism exhibition at the Tate Gallery, with Michael O'Pray, in 1985.

== Work ==
Keane's 1978 multimedia work, She, presented at the Hayward Gallery, London, in 1978 was an early example of performance that incorporated live video and slide projections. Transparencies of neon signs, poetry and images of shop windows featuring mannequins were projected on a wall before which Keane performed, while video of the performance played on monitors surmounted with neon texts. Keane has said that the work brought into play "the actual and the recorded, the shop dummy, and the person, the illusion and the reality".

Transposition, first presented at the Museum of Modern Art, Vienna, in 1992, used the body as a screen with video projected onto the naked backs of men as they glide sideways standing on a travelator. Keane subsequently re-edited the piece into a double screen video installation for the inaugural Tanks programme at Tate Modern, London, in 2012.

== Career ==
=== Teaching ===
Keane has been an important influence on successive generations of artists in the UK as a teacher at Central Saint Martins College of Arts and Design, London, where she was Lecturer in Film & Video since 1982 and Research Fellow from 2003 to 2012. Notable students who were mentored by Keane include Sandra Lahire, Sarah Turner and Isaac Julien. According to Malcolm Le Grice:

"During the 1970s and ’80s, the teaching of women artists – including Tina Keane, Anna Thew, Anne Tallentire, Joanna Greenhill and Pam Skelton –was one of Saint Martins’ major contributions to art education. Their influence helped create a lasting shift in the gender profile in British art, and Saint Martins in general maintained a committed concern for gender, ethnicity and sexual politics throughout the Thatcher years.”

== Awards ==
Keane has received awards for her work including:

- 2015: Paul Hamlyn Foundation Awards for Artists

== Exhibitions ==
=== Group ===
Year	Title	Institution	Location	Notes	Ref
1978		Hayward Gallery	London	Featured her work She (1978)	
1992		Museum of Modern Art	Vienna	Featured her work Transposition	
2012		Tanks, Tate Modern	London	Featured her work Transposition	
2020	Radical Landscapes	Tate	London	Featured her work In Our Hands (1982-84)	

== Collections ==
Keane's work is held in several public collections:

- Tate:
  - 2018: Her pioneering, poetic film, Faded Wallpaper (1988)
  - 2020: Her film celebrating the Greenham Common women peace protestors, In Our Hands (1982-84)
