= Susan Collins (artist) =

British artist and academic (born 1964)

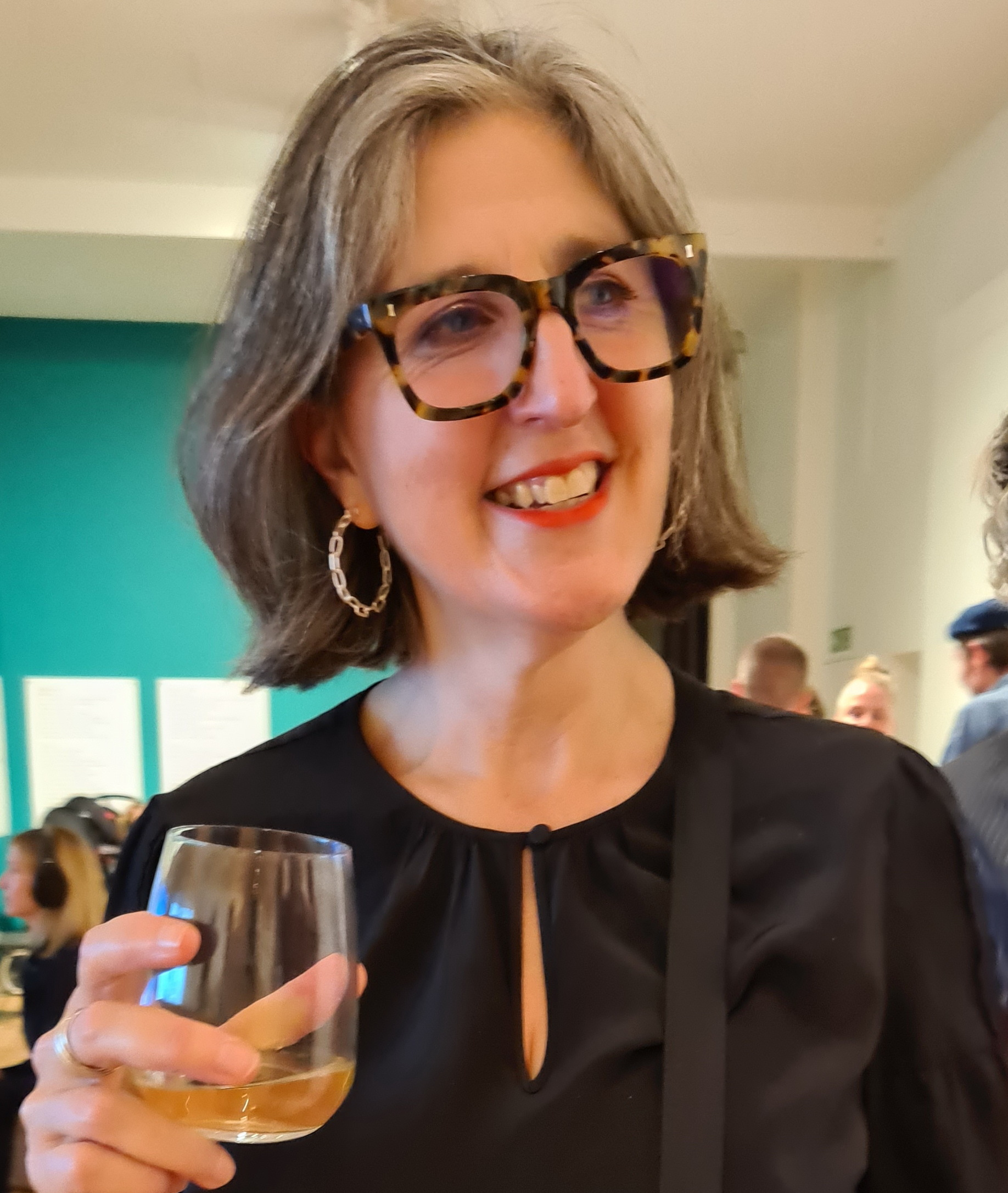
- Collins at the Tate Britain Annual Party, 2024
- Born: 1964 (age 61–62); London, England
- Education: Slade School of Fine Art; School of the Art Institute of Chicago
- Occupations: Artist and academic
- Known for: Digital art
- Awards: BAFTA Award, 2004 (nominated)

Susan Alexis Collins (born 1964, London) is a British artist and academic. She was Slade Professor and Director of the Slade School of Fine Art in London, England.

== Biographical notes ==
Collins studied Fine Art at the Slade School, where she graduated as a Bachelor of Arts with Honours in 1987. In the early 1990s, she studied at the School of the Art Institute of Chicago after receiving a Fulbright Scholarship. Returning to England, she was appointed to set up the Electronic Media department at the Slade in 1995. The UCL Slade Centre for Electronic Media in Fine Art was founded in the same year. In 2005, Collins was appointed Head of the Undergraduate Fine Art Media area at Slade; in 2010, she became Head of Department and Director of the School. In 2013, she was appointed Slade Professor of Fine Art.

As an artist, Collins mainly works with digital media. Her 2002–03 project Tate in Space was nominated for a BAFTA Award in 2004. She has exhibited in the UK, Canada, Denmark, Finland, the Netherlands, Germany, Switzerland, Bulgaria, Turkey, Israel, Tasmania, Thailand, Mexico and Peru.

== Works of art (selection) ==
In Conversation (1997–2001): an internet project in which users could talk to people in the street via an animated mouth. The project won the 2012 Dutch Kunstbeeld thesis prize.

Classroom of the Future (2001–2005): a classroom design for Mossbrook Special School in Sheffield, a collaboration with architect Sarah Wigglesworth, which won an RSA Art for Architecture award. Collins added an interactive environment to Wigglesworth' building, consisting of a wildlife surveillance system, a camera obscura and an audio environment called the "ballpool".

Tate in Space (2002): Collins invented this tongue-in-cheek project that aimed to establish a branch of the Tate Galleries in outer space. Part of the project, that included a spoof website, was the launch of the 'Tate Satellite' which was visible from earth.

Underglow (2005–2006): the project consisted of illuminations of a number of drains in the vicinity of Guildhall Yard, King Street and Queen Street in the City of London, which were visible from dusk to dawn during the winter of 2005–06. The project was commissioned by the City of London Corporation and Modus Operandi as part of the 'Light Up Queen Street' programme.

Fenlandia, Glenlandia, Harewood (2005–2014): a series of online project time-coding landscapes and cityscapes. The original commission was by Film and Video Umbrella and Norwich School of Art and Design. For 12 months, a webcam was placed on the roof of the Anchor Inn, a 17th-century coaching inn in Sutton Gault, Cambridgeshire, part of the area known as Silicon Fen. The installation stored a single pixel of the recorded webcam image every second, building up a new image from left to right, top to bottom in horizontal bands. Thus the final image was built up from individual pixels collected over a total of approximately 21 hours and 20 minutes. This process was repeated for 365 days, from May 2004 until May 2005, after which the project was moved to Cambourne (also in Silicon Fenn), Greenham Common and Bracknell, Berkshire (both in the M4 corridor. Similar projects took place in Loch Faskally, Perthshire, Scotland, from 2005 until 2007 (Glenlandia), at Harewood House near Leeds in 2008, and in Lambeth, London, in 2013 and 2014.

Seascape (2009): a digital work that consists of a series of gradually unfolding digital seascapes, featured at the De La Warr Pavilion in Bexhill-on-Sea, East Sussex. These digital seascapes were captured in real time by webcams installed at five key coastal vantage points on the South Coast between Margate and Portsmouth. The webcams were sited at each location for up to a year before the start of the show, recording fluctuations in the light that are a characteristic feature of the English coastline.
