= Tony Godwin =

British publisher

Anthony Richard James Wylie Godwin (17 December 1919 – 15 March 1976) was an influential British publisher of the 1960s/1970s. His contribution to the publishing industry is recognized in the form of the Tony Godwin Memorial Trust.

Born in Ledbury, Herefordshire, he started the avant-garde bookshop Better Books in Charing Cross Road, where author Barry Miles worked. He also ran Bumpus Books and the City Bookshop in London.

In May 1960, Godwin was recruited to join the senior editorial group at Penguin Books and rose to the position of Chief Editor. He sought to update editorial and design policies. With this aim in mind, he hired Germano Facetti in January 1961, who replaced the original Penguin cover design system with the grid layout. He also brought in another designer, Alan Aldridge, who pushed for a more radical transformation. Godwin established the Penguin Modern Classics subseries in 1961 and The English Library series in 1965.

In 1967, Godwin published Penguin's English edition of acclaimed French cartoonist Siné's periodical Massacre. It contained anti-clerical cartoons and Foyles book store chain refused to stock the book. A row over the book led to Godwin being fired by Penguin's founder, Allen Lane.

Godwin went on to become managing director of publisher Weidenfeld and Nicolson, and in 1972 crossed the Atlantic to start his own imprint under the umbrella of American publisher Harcourt Brace Jovanovitch. Godwin published many high-profile writers such as Edna O'Brien and Len Deighton.

== Marriage ==
In 1961, Godwin married his second wife, Fay Godwin, who became a successful landscape photographer after they separated in 1969. They had two sons, Nicholas and Jeremy. Nicholas went on to become a documentary maker.

== Death ==
Godwin died suddenly in New York City in 1976 from an asthma attack, aged 56. Novelist John Berger said of Godwin, "[N]ow that he is dead I feel like an orphan."
