= Nuclear weapons free world =

Imagined society with no nuclear weapons

Current status: Nuclear-weapon-free zones NW states Nuclear sharing NPT only

A Nuclear weapons free world is an imagined society in which nuclear weapons are eliminated and no state possesses, produces, or deploys them. The concept is the ultimate goal of nuclear disarmament, which seeks the reduction and eventual elimination of nuclear arsenals through international treaties, verification mechanisms, and political commitments.

== United Nations postition ==
Former Secretary-General of the United Nations Ban Ki-moon remakred that "my goal – our goal – is to make the whole world a nuclear-weapon-free zone". His remark emphasized that the Nuclear-weapon-free zone model of regional zones banning nuclear weapons could eventually be expanded globally, leading to the complete elimination of nuclear weapons.

The idea has been a central goal of international disarmament efforts since the establishment of the United Nations in 1945. Governments, international organizations, and civil society movements have advocated for the elimination of nuclear weapons due to their catastrophic humanitarian and other consequences.
