= Red Skirts on Clydeside =

1984 film by the Sheffield Film Cooperative

- Directed by: Jenny Woodley; Christine Bellamy
- Narrated by: Christine Cox
- Cinematography: Caroline Spry
- Edited by: Jenny Woodley
- Music by: Fish and Plume
- Production company: Sheffield Film Cooperative
- Release date: 1984
- Running time: 40 minutes
- Countries: Scotland, England
- Language: English
- Budget: £55,800

Red Skirts on Clydeside is a British documentary film directed by Jenny Woodley and Christine Bellamy. Produced in 1984, it is the fifth made by the Sheffield Film Cooperative.

It follows the process of rediscovering women's histories, focusing on the Glasgow Rent Strikes of 1915 and four of the women involved: Helen Crawfurd, Agnes Dollan, Mary Barbour, Jean Fergusson.

The title plays on the name Red Clydeside, given to the period of political radicalism in Glasgow and other urban areas along the River Clyde during the 1910s, 1920s and 1930s, but suggesting the involvement of women.

== Synopsis ==
The film follows the literal and metaphorical journey of the filmmakers as they attempt to unearth the details of women's political involvement in the Glasgow Rent Strikes, by visiting archives in Glasgow and London and through oral history interviews with several Glaswegian women who recall the period. We are shown both how women's contributions are often undervalued by archives and how personal narratives from marginalised voices can enrich our understanding of events.

The film's interviews with descendants of the strikers establish the link between the Glasgow Rent Strike and the women's movement of the 1910s. The extent of this mobilisation of women offers evidence of the political nature and potential of a supposedly "unpolitical hearth". The film's focus is on personal accounts rather than the wider context of the women's movement, class struggle and politics. The interviewees describe their own lives and education as an informed and highly conscious political upbringing.

== Participants ==
The filmmakers speak to seven women during the course of the film.

- Jessie Findley - ″a political activist all her life″
- Margaret Young, Kathy Mailer, Sadie Fulton - their ″parents were politically active during the period″
- Mary and Jessie Barbour - granddaughters of Mary Barbour
- Elspeth King - ″a feminist historian, [who] had researched the early Scottish women’s movement″ and curator at The People’s Palace in Glasgow, which ″has a collection of suffrage material″

== Funding ==
The production cost around £55,800 and funding was received from several sources, including the British Film Institute, Sheffield City Council and income generated by the Co-Op's speaking and distribution fees.
