= Circles (film distributor) =

UK feminist film distribution network

Circles was a feminist film and video distribution network in the UK, which was set up out of a desire to distribute and screen women's films on their own terms. It was founded in 1979 by feminist filmmakers Lis Rhodes, Jo Davis, Felicity Sparrow and Annabel Nicolson, publishing a 1980 catalogue including about 30 films, and it closed in 1991, largely due to funding issues that also prompted the merger of Circles and Cinema of Women, which led to the formation of Cinenova. A previous funding crisis in 1987, when funding by Tower Hamlets council had been withdrawn, had been resolved with replacement funding from the British Film Institute.

== Origins ==
According to Jenny Holland and Jane Harris, "Circles started in 1979, partly as a response to an Arts Council of Great Britain exhibition on experimental film. Feeling that their work on women's involvement in this field was being marginalised, the women on the exhibition committee withdrew their painstakingly researched work and issued an explanatory statement. In many ways, this research was the cornerstone of Circles, which went on to distribute the films by Alice Guy, Germaine Dulac, Maya Deren, and Lois Weber which were to have been discussed in the exhibition." The statement, "Women and the Formal Film", was published in the Film as Film exhibition catalogue and acted as a manifesto for the distribution collective that emerged.

== Film catalogue ==
By the time of its closure, Circles' catalogue comprised more than 200 titles, predominantly short and medium-length films, encompasses 90 years of women's film production and including a range of original formats, "offering tape recording, video tapes, slide/tape and performance works for hire alongside film." The catalogue editors described the films and their significance as:

representing the visions, truths and ideas of women from a diverse range of cultural and political backgrounds. Each film/video breaks the monopoly of the male-defined culture, placing women at the centre of the images, the stories and the language; replacing male subjectivity with women's experiences as female eyes look through the camera… These films and videos represent the voices of women who have been systematically silenced and abused, by a mainstream media and cinema, whose interest in ideas and people are based on commercial concerns of profit and the desire to maintain women as spectators. Women in refusing to be confined to this role have produced films and videos, often with low budgets or none at all; often under difficult personal circumstances, yet independently without the pressure to either compromise politically or aesthetically. Despite narrow ideas of content, form and 'entertainment', which have excluded and dismissed this body of work, women are producing films and videos on a larger scale than ever before and the demand for this material is increasing.

Circles was a membership organisation. "All women whose films Circles distribute automatically become members, which means they have the right to become involved in creating policy." The selection of titles was carried out by a regular Viewing Committee, composed of an open panel with wide representation from women's groups involved in production and exhibition. Pratibha Parmar notes that, in 1987, this led to the foregrounding of films by women of colour, quoting Circles member June Givanni on the creation of the short films programme Black Women and Invisibility: "invisibility here is about the lack of recognition by the wider community, and to some extent the black community that there are black women film-makers working in Britain. The range of films and videos made by black women available in this country is growing."

== Distribution ==
According to the catalogue, Circles organised women-only screenings at the Four Corners 50 seater cinema in Bethnal Green, London, and also in association with other women's organisations across Britain. At these events, film/video producers were invited to talk about their work. Describing Circles' business model, Caroline Merz writes that "Circles [had a] commitment to returning the highest possible revenue to film-makers, many of whom are not waged for their work, and a refusal to undercut their rental prices by providing what would, in effect, be subsidised programming."

== Legacy ==
Many Circles titles continue to circulate in the UK via Cinenova, and Circles' content and history were prominent in the 2011 Cinenova exhibition Reproductive Labour at London's The Showroom gallery. Holland and Harris comment that: "Circles has had an impact far out of proportion to its small size and chronic financial insecurity."
