= Peter Gidal =

British filmmaker (born 1946)

Peter Gidal (born 1946) is a British avant-garde filmmaker and film theorist.

== Biography ==
Gidal was born in 1946, growing up in Mount Vernon, New York and Switzerland. He studied theater, psychology, and literature at Brandeis University from 1964 to 1968 and enrolled at LMU Munich from 1966 to 1967.

Gidal moved to London in July 1968 to study at the Royal College of Art. He quickly joined the London Film-Makers' Co-op. Gidal was concerned by American imperialism during the Vietnam War, and his filmmaking explicitly focused on questions of representation that were both aesthetic and political. Deke Dusinberre distinguished Gidal's films from American structural films based on their shapelessness, writing that "the end of the film cannot be predicted, there is no 'goal' achieved, and there is no overall shape which could be metaphorically exploited to engage other issues." He highlighted Room Film 1973 as a culmination of Gidal's mature films for its denial of easily recognizable images, its erratic camera movements, and its "sense of surface". Critic Bob Cowan panned Gidal's films, describing them as "typically representative of the pathetic vacuousness of certain works included in the minimal-structural camp."

Gidal's best-known essay "Theory and Definition of Structural/Materialist Film", first published in 1974, was influential in championing European avant-garde film of the time. He published the 1976 Structural Film Anthology, one of the earliest books to cover British avant-garde cinema.

== Filmography ==
- Portrait Subject Object (1967)
- Upside Down Feature (1967)
- Room (Double Take) (1967)
- Still Andy (1968)
- Hall (1968)
- Key (1968)
- Clouds (1969)
- Heads (1969)
- Focus (1971)
- 8mm Film Notes on 16mm (1971)
- Movie No 1 (1972)
- Film Print (1973)
- Photo/Graph/Film (1973)
- Room Film 1973 (1973)
- C/O/N/S/T/R/U/C/T (1974)
- Condition of Illusion (1975)
- Kopenhagen 1930 (1977)
- Silent Partner (1977)
- 4th Wall (1978)
- Epilogue (1978)
- Untitled (1978)
- Action at a Distance (1980)
- Close Up (1983)
- Guilt (1988)
- Flare Out (1992)
- No Night No Day (1997)
- Assumption (1997)
- Volcano (2002)
- Coda I (2013)
- Coda II (2013)
- Not Far at All (2013)

== Bibliography ==
- Dusinberre, Deke (1976). "Peter Gidal". In Gidal, Peter (ed.). Structural Film Anthology. British Film Institute. ISBN 978-0-85170-053-3.
- O'Pray, Michael, ed. (1996). The British Avant-Garde Film 1926 to 1995: An Anthology of Writings. University of Luton Press. ISBN 978-1-86020-004-5.
