= Cinenova =

UK non-profit organisation

Cinenova is a British non-profit organisation based in London, dedicated to the preservation and distribution of films and videos made by women, transgender, and gender non-conforming filmmakers. Formed in 1991 from the merger of two feminist distributors, Circles and Cinema of Women, Cinenova was founded to help promote experimental films, narrative feature films, artists film and video, documentary and educational videos. The organization’s central activities include building and maintaining an extensive moving image archive, organizing curated events and exhibitions, facilitating research, and supporting education in feminist film and video culture.

== History ==
Circles, established in 1979, specialized in experimental film and video and pioneered women-only screenings and collaborative curatorial models. Cinema of Women, also set up in 1979, focused on documentary and activist productions concerned with women’s rights and queer-feminist themes. The merger of the two organizations allowed Cinenova to consolidate experience, resources, and collections at a time of shifting cultural policies and funding landscapes.

The Cinenova archive holds more than 500 titles, ranging from avant-garde and narrative feature films to documentaries, artists’ videos, and historical works produced from the 1910s to the present. Thematically, the collection spans oppositional histories, postcolonial and decolonial discourse, domestic and care work, and the representation of gender, sexuality, and social difference. Its holdings also encompass rare posters, catalogs, and ephemera related to feminist and queer filmmaking practices. The organisation proactively engages in the preservation and restoration of archival materials, including digitizing legacy works and facilitating research access for academics, artists, and curators. Cinenova also has an archive fund relating to film and video directed by women, with a focus on the UK independent film.

== Cinenova Working Group ==
The Cinenova Working Group was established in 2010 to oversee ongoing preservation, distribution, and institutional projects. Operating as a volunteer collective, its members include artists, curators, researchers, and activists committed to maintaining the integrity and accessibility of the collection. The working group develops exhibition and screening programs, and undertakes research and advocacy initiatives, continually refining organizational practices to meet emerging challenges in independent film archiving and feminist cultural preservation.

== Activities ==
2011 – “Reproductive Labour” Exhibition and Film Programme, The Showroom, London

This exhibition and film programme highlighted Cinenova’s archive, focusing on feminist, queer, and black filmmaking through screenings, lectures, and interactive research sessions.

2011 – “Group Affinity” Summer School and Exhibition, Kunstverein Munich.

Cinenova participated with international artists in a summer school and exhibition in Munich, facilitating dialogue and reflection on feminist film production and collective practices.

2011 – “Fire Eating Air,” Amsterdam

Cinenova contributed a film programme to “If I Can’t Dance, I Don’t Want to Be Part of Your Revolution” in Amsterdam.

2012 – “The Grand Domestic Revolution GOES ON” Exhibition, The Showroom, London

An exhibition exploring the politics of domestic and reproductive labour through archival feminist films reflecting historic themes. The show ran for several weeks and offered critical reflection on feminist political histories.

2012 – “Cinenova Film Festival”, Salong, Munich

The festival presented curated screenings such as “the elsewhere and the here,” featuring themes such as migration, feminism, and family structures.

2013 – Exhibition at Kunsthalle Exnergasse, Vienna

Participation in “Select and Dispossess Festival”, Vienna. Cinenova presented feminist film programs at this multi-day festival addressing issues of colonialism, memory, and social justice. Cinenova organized an exhibition and discussion event, introducing the organization and their archive to audiences in Vienna and Linz.

Since 2015 – “Now Showing” Film Series, The Showroom, London

A recurring film series inviting contemporary artists to showcase works from the Cinenova archive alongside their own productions, engaging in dialogue across feminist film histories and present-day artistic practices.

2017 onwards – Regular Public Programmes and Touring Screenings: Cinenova continues to organize touring exhibitions and film programmes, such as “The Work We Share” (2021-2022), which digitized and presented archival works at UK institutions including Kettle’s Yard, Spike Island, and Modern Art Oxford, Berlin.

2018 – “If You Can’t Share No One Gets Any”, LUX Cinema, London

Organized by members of the Cinenova Working Group, this exhibition featured accessible screenings from the archive, with a focus on engaging diverse audiences, including those with hearing and visual impairments.

International Outreach: Cinenova collaborates with institutions and festivals worldwide, including events in Toronto (All Hands on the Archive, 2012), Berlin (Globale Film Festival, 2011), and ongoing screenings across Europe and North America.

== See also ==
- Women's Cinema
