= Sheffield Film Cooperative =

Media co-operative based in Sheffield, England

The Sheffield Film Cooperative (also known as the Sheffield Women's Film Co-op) were a media co-operative based in Sheffield, England. The group emerged in the early 1970s with a view to highlight particular issues being faced by women at the time but officially formed as the Sheffield Film Co-op (SFC) in 1975. The founding members were Jenny Woodley, Christine Bellamy, Gill Booth and Barbara Fowkes.

== Beginnings ==
Prior to the formation of SFC, Woodley, Bellamy, Booth and Fowkes had worked on several media outputs of a similar subject matter. In 1971 with support from producer and playwright Dave Sheasby, they produce a six-part series of radio shows called Not a Pretty Face, based the demands of the feminist movement including equal pay, education and job opportunities, free contraception, abortion rights and care for the under 5's.

With the birth of Sheffield Cablevision Woodley, Bellamy, Booth and Fowkes decided they had found a platform for their message and produce two programs: the difficulties of moving around the city with a child in a pushchair and the need for childminders to be registered.

== Formation of Sheffield Film Co-op ==
It was due to the nature of their next project that the collective of women decided to officially organise themselves as the Sheffield Film Co-op. The group wanted to make a program in defence of abortion at a time where rights we're under threat before parliament. A Woman Like You, docu-drama came out in 1976 and marked the official beginnings of the Sheffield Film Co-op.

== Filmography ==
- 1991 - Personal Best / Talking Hairs / Running Gay
- 1990 - Women Can Make It Work
- 1990 - Thankyou That's all I Knew
- 1989 - Diamonds in Brown Paper
- 1987 - Bringing It all Back Home
- 1986 - Let Our Children Grow Tall!
- 1986 - For a Living Wage
- 1984 - Women of Steel
- 1984 - Changing Our Lives - 5 Arches Community Centrey
- 1984 - Red Skirts on Clydeside
- 1982 - A Question of Choice
- 1978 - Jobs for the Girls
- 1977 - That's No Lady
- 1975 - A Woman Like You
