= Lis Rhodes =

British artist and feminist filmmaker (born 1942)

- Born: 1942 (age 83–84); Cornwall, England
- Education: North East London Polytechnic; Royal College of Art
- Known for: Film and visual art

Lis Rhodes (born 1942) is a British artist and feminist filmmaker, known for her density, concentration, and poeticism in her visual works. She has been active in the UK since the early 1970s.

== Early life and education ==
Rhodes was brought up in West England, was educated at North East London Polytechnic, and studied Film and Television at the Royal College of Art.

== Career ==
Since the early 1970s, Rhodes has created radical and controversial art that challenges her viewers to question perspective of film through her work. She wanted her audience to "reconsider film as a medium of communication and presentation of image, language and sound."

She was cinema curator at the London Film-Makers' Co-op from 1975 to 1976. In 1979, Rhodes co-founded the feminist film distribution network, Circles. She was a member of the exhibition committee for the 1979 Arts Council Film on Film event, and international retrospective of avant-garde cinema. Rhodes was Arts Advisor to the Greater London Council from 1982 to 1985, and since 1978 has lectured part-time at the Slade School of Fine Art, University College London.

One key innovative piece Rhodes created is Light Music (1975), which was exhibited at the Tate Modern from July 2012 – January 2013. Tate deemed it, "An iconic work of expanded cinema that created a more central and participatory role for the viewer within a dynamic, immersive environment". Her work was also included in the 2007 exhibition WACK! Art and the Feminist Revolution.

In 2012, Rhodes' solo exhibition, Dissonance and Disturbance was held at the Institute of Contemporary Arts, London. The ICA noted that Rhodes "examines the relationships in her work - from film, composition and writing - to the notation of sound and image, and the language of political dissent."

According to Rhodes, "The view through the lens may be blurred or defined – focused or unfocusfocused or unfocused – depending on what you think you know; what you imagine you see; what you learn to look for: what you are told is visible". Rhodes does not view her art as an isolated practice, but rather as a social function. She lives and works in London.

Rhodes won the Freelands Award in 2017. In 2018, Rhodes' work was included in the Courtisane Film Festival in Ghent, Belgium as part of a focus on women filmmakers that curators, Mónica Savirón and María Palacios Cruz, felt have been overlooked. In October 2022, a group of artists plan to present Liquid Architecture x Light at the ACMI's Gallery 3 inspired by Rhode's 1975 Light Music in conjunction with the exhibit, Light: Works from Tate’s Collection, being held at Melbourne's ACMI.

== Partial filmography ==
- Dresden Dynamo (1972)
- Light Music (1975)
- Light Reading (1978)
- Hang on a Minute series (1983–85)
- A Cold Draft (1988)
- In the Kettle (2010)
- Whitehall (2012)
