= Better Books =

British bookstore

Coordinates: 51°30′50″N 0°7′45.5″W

Better Books was an independent bookstore. It was founded by Tony Godwin and was located at 94 Charing Cross Road, London. The shop was a significant location in the 1960s counterculture movement in London.

== History ==
It was founded by British publisher Tony Godwin who took over the premises at 94 Charing Cross Road, London, in 1946.

In 1964, Tony Godwin visited San Francisco and the City Lights Bookstore. He met Lawrence Ferlinghetti and suggested a work exchange, whereby Ferlinghetti would send "one of his Beats over in exchange for an English salesman who needed some education". City Lights store manager Dick McBride moved to the United Kingdom for six months to help "bohemianize" Better Books.

Better Books had a string of influential managers including Bill Butler, Bob Cobbing and Barry Miles, who set about ordering a large quantity of books from City Lights and Grove Press. Another manager, of the American and underground wing, was David Kozubei, who was later invited to the United States to run and radicalize a bookstore in Ann Arbor, Michigan, from whence he was recruited by the Borders brothers with a promise of a partnership which never materialized, to set up, stock, and manage their first flagship store, also in Ann Arbor.

Better Books was once described as a "mini Arts Lab", and served as stage, cinema and gallery. Its cross-disciplinary approach welcomed new art forms such as assemblage, performance art, and radical poetry. Together with other alternative galleries, including 26 Kingly Street and Miles' Indica Bookshop, Better Books was one of the hot spots of the London underground scene.

It was home to the Better Books Writers Nights and in March 1965 it housed the sTigma Environmental Exhibition, inspired by Alex Trocchi's Sigma, A Tactical Blueprint and featuring a contribution by Jeff Nuttall.

Allen Ginsberg arrived at Better Books in May 1965, and offered to read anywhere for free. Ginsberg's first reading at Better Books was described by Jeff Nuttall as "the first healing wind on a very parched collective mind" and in Peace News, Tom McGrath wrote: "This could well turn out to have been a very significant moment in the history of England - or at least in the history of English Poetry". Shortly after the reading at Better Books, plans were hatched for the International Poetry Incarnation.

Later, another shop called Better Books opened in Forrest Road, Edinburgh and became part of the city's "alternative" scene during the 1970s. It followed a similar policy to the London shop, and was used as a venue for poetry readings during the Edinburgh Festival.
