= London Film-Makers' Co-op =

British film-making workshop

The London Film-makers' Co-operative, or LFMC, was a British film-making workshop founded in 1966. It was largely responsible for the rise of British avant-garde cinema in the later 1960s. Work produced by members of the LFMC in the late 1960s and early 1970s has been labelled Structural/Materialist Film.

== History ==
The LFMC grew out of film screenings at the Better Books bookstore, part of the 1960s counter-culture in London, before moving to the original Arts Lab on Drury Lane. Then it shared offices with John 'Hoppy' Hopkins' BIT information service, before, with the breakaway group that formed the New Arts Lab, moving to the Camden-based Institute for Research in Art and Technology. With the end of IRAT's lease in 1971 the Co-op found a base in a long-term squat in a former dairy at 13a Prince of Wales Crescent in Kentish Town. From 1978 the LFMC Workshop, Distribution Archive and Cinema was based in Gloucester Avenue in Camden in a former British Rail Working Men’s Club building owned by British Rail, which for a number of years to the mid ‘80’s also housed the London Musicians Collective. In 1997 the LFMC including the Co-op Cinema moved together with London Video Arts to the new Lux Centre with a short lived Gallery exhibition space (3 year lease) Hoxton Square.

It was founded by, amongst others, Stephen Dwoskin and Malcolm Le Grice, being inspired by Jonas Mekas's The Film-Makers' Cooperative in New York. One difference between the New York Co-op and the LFMC was that the LFMC was organized as an egalitarian, worksharing cooperative, which assisted production as well as distribution. It initially had close links with American experimental cinema. Carla Liss ran the co-op's distribution archive.

Filmmakers associated with the group include Malcolm Le Grice and Steve Dwoskin (founder members), Peter Gidal, Michael "Atters" Attree, Carolee Schneemann, Annabel Nicolson, Lis Rhodes, Gill Eatherley, Roger Hammond, Mike Dunford, Anne Rees-Mogg, David Crosswaite, Jonathan Langran, David Larcher, Gary Woods, John Du Cane, Philip Goring, Chris Welsby, Fred Drummond, et al. and William Raban, who managed the LFMC workshop from 1972 - 76. Sally Potter made several short films at the LFMC in the early 1970s.

== Fate ==
The LFMC's annual BFI Regional Film funding as a Limited Company and Registered Charity was withdrawn in 1999, without notification of its membership. The Arts Council of England sought to force the amalgamation of the London Film-makers Co-operative Distribution Archive with London Electronic Arts formerly London Video Access to form Lux Ltd. In less than one financial year the limited company set up by the Arts Council went into liquidation, resulting in the sale of its assets by Price Waterhouse Cooper. London Film-makers Co-op life members with legal advice gathered together proofs from key members including founder members of donated items of workshop and film projection equipment. With legal documentation those items were successfully withdrawn from the Price Waterhouse Cooper sale. LUX.
