= Malcolm Le Grice =

British artist (1940–2024)

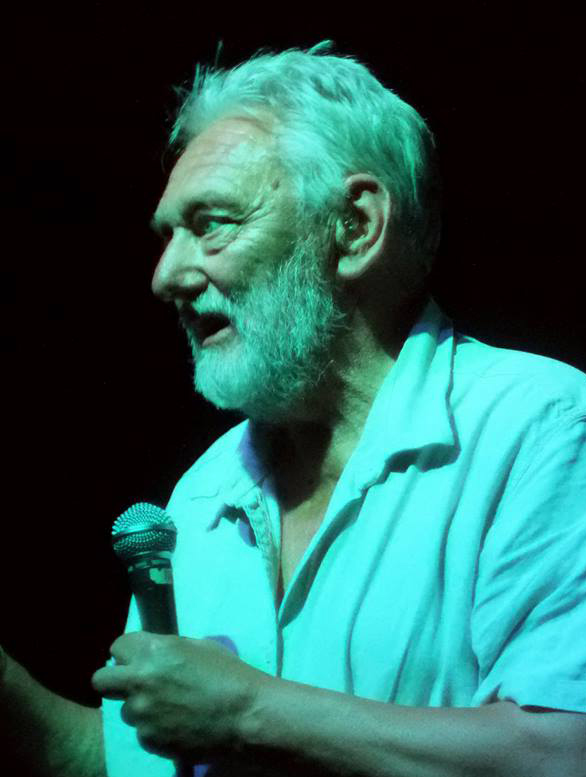
- Le Grice in 2015
- Born: 15 May 1940; Plymouth, Devon, England
- Died: 3 December 2024 (aged 84)
- Education: Arts University Plymouth; Slade School of Fine Art
- Style: Experimental film
- Title: Professor Emeritus, University of the Arts London
- Spouse: Judith Le Grice
- Children: 2
- Website: malcolmlegrice.com

Malcolm Le Grice (15 May 1940 – 3 December 2024) was a British artist known for his avant-garde film work.

The British Film Institute claimed that he was "probably the most influential modernist filmmaker in British cinema".

== Biography ==
Le Grice was born in Plymouth, Devon, on 15 May 1940. He studied painting at the Arts University Plymouth. He studied at the Slade School of Fine Art. He founded the London Film-Makers' Co-op workshop in the late 1960s, at the same time introducing film to fine art students at Saint Martin's School of Art and the Goldsmiths, University of London. He balanced his practice as a filmmaking artist with campaigning for the art form in print, in higher education, and in committees at the British Film Institute and the Arts Council.

Le Grice started his career as a painter but began to make film and computer works in the mid 1960s, becoming a pioneer of computer-generated filmmaking. From that point he showed regularly in Europe and the U.S. and his work was screened in many international film festivals, including retrospectives at the 2015 Media City Film Festival and REDCAT in 2019. He also showed in major art exhibitions including the Biennale de Paris 8, Arte Inglese Oggi, Milan, Une histoire du cinéma, Paris, Documenta 6, X-Screen at the Mumok, and Behind the Facts at the Fundació Joan Miró.

His work was screened at the Museum of Modern Art, the Louvre and the Tate Modern and Tate Britain and is in permanent collections including: the Centre Pompidou, the Cinematek, the National Film and Sound Archive, Deutsche Kinemathek, Canadian Distribution Centre, Montreal and Archives du Film Experimental D'Avignon. A number of his longer films were transmitted on British television, including Finnegans Chin, Sketches for a Sensual Philosophy and Chronos Fragmented. His main works from the mid 1980s were in video and digital media and includes the multi-projection video installation works The Cyclops Cycle and Treatise.

Le Grice wrote critical and theoretical works including a history of experimental cinema, titled Abstract Film and Beyond (1977, Studio Vista and MIT). For three years in the 1970s he wrote a regular column for the art monthly Studio International and published numerous other articles on film, video and digital media. Many of these were collected and published under the title Experimental Cinema in the Digital Age by the British Film Institute in 2011. Le Grice was a Professor Emeritus of the University of the Arts London. He established the Film Department at Saint Martin's School of Art. Le Grice was also a former Dean of Media Art at the University of Westminster. He served on the committees of the British Film Institute, the Arts Council, the CNAA, the Higher Education Funding Council for England and the Arts and Humanities Research Council.

Le Grice was married to Judith Le Grice and had two children. He died on 3 December 2024, at the age of 84.

== Selected works ==
=== Paintings ===
- Untitled (1962)
- Painting (1963)
- Castle Assemblage 1 (1964)
- Castle Assemblage 2 (1964)
- After Manet 1 (1985)
- Walking By (1985)
- Leonardo Tryptich (1993)
- Berlin Horse Block (1998)
- Before you came After I've gone (2003)
- Orchard Comp 5b
- Topology Exploration 3

=== Films, videos and photographs ===
- China Tea (Silent, 1965)
- Castle 1 (1966)
- Little Dog for Roger (1967)
- Yes No Maybe Maybenot (1967)
- Talla (Silent, 1967)
- Blind White Duration (Silent, 1967)
- Castle Two (1968)
- Grass (Slide-tape, 1968)
- Wharf (Slide-tape film, 1968)
- Spot the Microdot (1969)
- Lucky Pigs (1970)
- Reign of the Vampire (1970)
- Berlin Horse (1970)
- Love Story 1 (Shadow play film, 1971)
- Love Story 2 (1971)
- Horror Film 1 (Shadow play film, 1971)
- Your Lips 3 (1971)
- 1919 (1971)
- Newport (Silent, 1972)
- Whitchurch Down (1972)
- Threshold (1972)
- Love Story 3 (Performance film, 1972)
- Horror Film 2 (Shadow play, 1972)
- Blue Field Duration (1972)
- After Leonardo (Play, 1973)
- Don't Say (Silent, 1973)
- Pre-Production (Slide-tape, 1973)
- Matrix (Loop film, 1973)
- Four Wall Duration (Loop film, 1973)
- Gross Fog (Loop film, 1973)
- Joseph's Coat (Loop film, 1973)
- Principles of Cinematography (Performance film, 1973)
- Screen Entrance Exit (Performance film, 1974)
- After Lumiere - l'arroseur arrosé (1974)
- After Manet - le dejeuner sur l'herb (1975)
- Academic Still Life (1976)
- Time and Motion Study (1976)
- Blackbird Descending - tense alignment (1977)
- Emily - third party speculation (1979)
- Finnegans Chin - temporal economy (1981)
- Digital Still Life (Video, 1984–1986)
- Arbitrary Logic (Video, 1984–1986)
- Heads I Win - Tails You Lose (Video, 1986)
- Like a Fox (Co-edited with Gill Etherley, Video, 1988)
- Rock Wave (Video, 1988)
- Juniper and the myths of origin (1988)
- Veritas (Video, 1988)
- Beware (Video, 1988)
- Et in Arcadia Ego (1988)
- Rape (1990)
- Weir (1993)
- Prelude (1993)
- Race (1993)
- Warsaw Window (1994)
- Cidre Boucher (1994)
- Balcony Water Colour (1994)
- Seeing the Future (1994)
- Out of the Crypt (1995)
- For the Benefit of Mr K (1995)
- Chronos Fragmented (1995)
- Joseph's Newer Coat (1998)
- Joseph's Newer Coat 6 (Video, 1998)
- Even the Cyclops Pays the Ferryman (Video, 1998)
- Still Life and Lunch in Little Italy (Video, 1999)
- Jazzy Jazzy Jazzy (Video, 2000)
- Neither Here Nor There (Video, 2001)
- Unforgettable - that's what you are (Loop video and art installation, 2002; Reworked in 2006)
- Travelling with Mark (Video, 2003)
- Cherry (Video, 2003)
- Digital Aberration (2004)
- Critical Moment 1 (2004)
- Autumn Horizon number 3 (2005)
- Lecture to an Academy (2006)
- Of Keys and Beauty (2006)
- Anthony Dundee (2006)
- Waiting for Ian (2006)
- H2O-0C-24.02.06-12.01GMT - 03,50.40W - 50.16.30N (2006)
- DENISINED - SINEDENIS (2006)
- Again Finnegan (2006)
- Taint (2007)
- Self Portrait after Raban Take Measure (2008)
- Water Lilies after Monet (2008)
- Absinthe (2010)
- FINITI (2011)
- Jonas (2013)
- Yann (2014)
- Where When (Video, 2015)
- Marking Time (Video, 2015)
- The Probability of God is About Zero (Video, 2015)

== Selected exhibitions ==
- Behind the Facts: Fundació Joan Miró, Barcelona, Spain. February-March 2004.
- Behind the Facts: Serralves, Porto, Portugal. May 2004.
- Avanto Helsinki Media Art Festival, Finland. November 2004.
- Behind the Facts: Fridericianum, Kassel, Germany. January-April 2005.
- Fundación Banco Santander: Sobre la historia (On History). Madrid, Spain. March-June 2007.
- International Film Festival Rotterdam, the Netherlands. 2007.
- Behind the Facts: Bogotá Museum of Modern Art, Colombia. March-June 2008.
- Tate Modern, London, England. November 2008.
- Retrospective: Espace Multimédia Gantner, Bourogne, France. November 2011-January 2012.
- Tate Modern, London, England. October 2012.
- Man with a Projector: Performa 13, New York City, U.S. November 2013.
- Richard Saltoun Gallery, London, England. 28 May-10 July 2015.
- Crossing the Threshold: BFI Southbank, London, England. May 2016.
- Microscope Gallery, New York City, U.S. October 2016.
- Anthology Film Archives, New York City, U.S. November 2016.
- Present Moments and Passing Time: Plymouth. January-March 2017.
- This Way Out of England: Gallery House in Retrospect; Filmaktion, Expanded Cinema and Film Performance. Curated by Mark Webber. March 2017.
- DNA: AND - Malcolm Le Grice, Selected Works 1960-2024. Velarde Gallery, Devon, England. 20 September-19 October 2024.

== Bibliography ==
- Le Grice, Malcolm (1977). Abstract Film and Beyond. Studio Vista. MIT. ISBN 0-289 70591 6, 0 262 12077 1. Translated into Greek by Ekdozeiz Kaztanioth in 1982.
- Le Grice, Malcolm (2011). Experimental Cinema in the Digital Age. BFI Publications, London. ISBN 0-85170-873-0.
