= David Lloyd Jones (architect) =

English architect

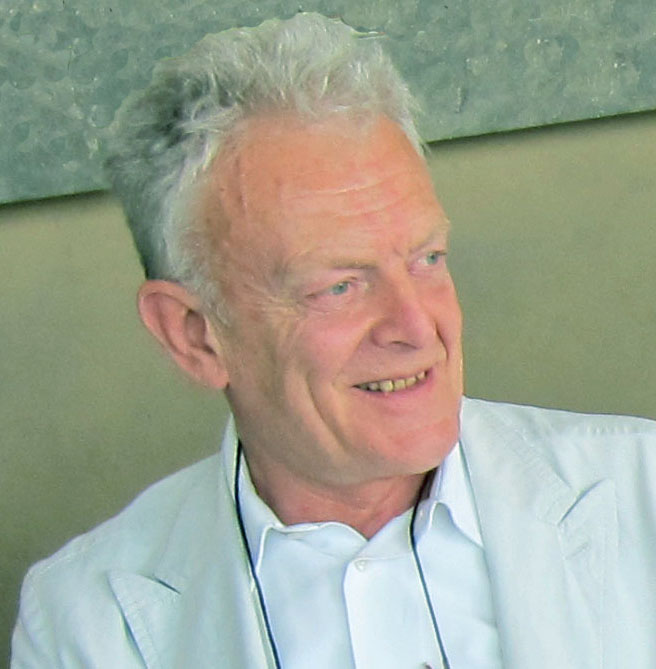
David Lloyd Jones

David Lloyd Jones is an English architect who is a founding partner of Studio E LLP, an architectural practice established in London in 1994. He has been described as "a godfather of the sustainable architecture movement in the UK". Lloyd Jones has been heavily involved in both promoting 'green' design and demonstrating it in practice. He has been responsible for a series of seminal bioclimatic buildings, including the National Farmers Union and Avon Insurance Head Office at Stratford upon Avon; the Solar Office Doxford International near Sunderland; Beaufort Court Zero Emissions Building at Kings Langley; Grange Park Opera House and the current new campus for The British College in Kathmandu. His book, Architecture and the Environment, was published in 1998. He is a founding member and chair of the charity Climate Change All Change.

== Biography ==
David Lloyd Jones was born on 10 May 1942 to Hester née Ritchie and Richard Lloyd Jones at Busbridge England in the rented gardener's cottage of Munstead Wood, the former home of Gertrude Jekyll designed by her protégé, Sir Edwin Lutyens. Shortly thereafter, at the end of World War 2, the family moved to nearby Catteshall Rough, his maternal grandmother's house, and then two years later to Springwood, a much extended Tudor farmhouse on the outskirts of the Surrey town of Godalming. The family lived there throughout his early boyhood moving back to Munstead in 1960. At the age of eight Lloyd Jones attended Edgeborough School as a border and then went on to Bradfield College in Berkshire. He left there in 1960 having gained a place at the Architectural Association School of Architecture in Bloomsbury, London.

Lloyd Jones studied architecture for five years at the AA, taking a year out in 1965 during which he worked for Stillman & Eastwick-Field Partnership, and secured a travel scholarship allowing him to spend six months visiting architectural practices in the US to obtain material for inclusion in the Architects' Journal. Tutors and teachers at the AA included Michael (John) Lloyd, John Winter, Patrick de Saulles, Cedric Price, Paul Oliver, Sir Peter Cook, Leon Krier, Charles Jencks, Robert Maxwell, Alan Colquhoun, and Alvin Boyarski. In 1966 David Lloyd Jones was awarded a Diploma in Architecture and took time off to travel through France and Italy on his Lambretta, subsidising his limited funds by working as a film extra.

The same year he joined the National Building Agency in London, a multi-disciplinary organisation established by the Wilson Government as a Semi-State body in 1960, under the directorship of Cleeve Barr, to provide services to both public and private sector clients and undertake specific tasks in support of radical new policies of Government in housing, urban renewal, and other construction related activities. Lloyd Jones worked on teams developing new concepts of government funded housing, including, high density, low rise housing schemes in the new towns of Crawley and Harlow, and published guides and handbooks covering housing design based on the newly introduced metric system of measurement.

While working at the NBA he was co-opted onto the London Borough of Camden Council's Arts Committee where, as member of the Festival Sub-Committee, he was charged with organising rock concerts in the Borough. To do so he teamed up with Michael Alfandary and Harvey Goldsmith to produce the first free open-air concert on Parliament Hill, London and in the Roundhouse (a converted steam engine maintenance building). Sets included It's a Beautiful Day, Carlos Santana, Pink Floyd, Yes, The Pretty Things, Soft Machine, Procol Harum, Roy Harper, and Fleetwood Mac. While serving on the Arts Committee David Lloyd Jones was asked to expend Camden's annual sum allocated to building up their public art collection. In doing so he bought from Derek Jarman, David Hockney, John Lifton and other up and coming artists. He was also, through support from the Borough, instrumental in setting up and fostering The Institute for Research in Art and Technology (London New Arts Lab), a newly conceived and popular forum for disseminating a spectrum of arts under a single roof. At the same time David Lloyd Jones had taken on the position of Honorary Treasurer to PEST (Pressure for Economic and Social Toryism), now incorporated into the Tory Reform Group, formed to put pressure on the Alec Douglas-Home government to introduce more relevant, egalitarian government policies. Colleagues in the pressure group included Michael Spicer, Baron Spicer of Cropthorne, Jeremy Baker and Sir Simon Jenkins.

David Lloyd Jones and Linda Stewart married in 1971. Linda Lloyd Jones' career has been in arts administration. She was Head of Exhibitions and Loans at the Victoria and Albert Museum between 1988and 2018. She previously worked for Penguin Books, the London Festival Ballet (now English National Ballet) and the ICA (Institute of Contemporary Arts).

Lloyd Jones moved to the multi-disciplinary RMJM (Robert Matthew Johnson Marshall and Partners) in 1972. Other projects on which he took key roles were: project architect for the development of facilities outside Mecca, Saudi Arabia for pilgrims attending the annual Hajj; deputy director of the Nigerian Universities Commission university development programme involving the setting of space and design standards, and funding mechanisms for seven new and existing university campuses located throughout Nigeria and carried out by seven international consortia; and project architect for the Royal Mint site development; and the introduction of barristers chambers into The Walks at Gray's Inn, London. In 1978 he led the design team for a new headquarters for NFU Mutual at Stratford-upon-Avon. The RMJM team included building physicist, Dr William Bordass, and architect, Walter Nageli. This building was acclaimed for its architecture with Colin Amery describing it as a "modern masterpiece" in the Financial Times and for being one of the first UK buildings to adopt a rigorous approach to environmental sustainability. It broke with the then current deep plan, air conditioned office template and became a touchstone for future commercial development, featuring in government sponsored guides for improved environmental performance. His designs for public exhibitions included "50 Penguin Years" at the Royal Festival Hall for Penguin Books; and "HRH Prince of Wales' (Charles, Prince of Wales) Vision of Britain" at the Victoria and Albert Museum. In 1986 Lloyd Jones became a director of RMJM London and chairman of the Design Group.

In 1991 David Lloyd Jones left RMJM to set up his own practice, David Lloyd Jones Associates, develop his work as a researcher and practitioner in the field of sustainable architecture and to travel; and, in 1994, he founded, with Cezary Bednarski and Andrzej Kuszell, Studio E Architects, now Studio E LLP.

Studio E was involved in building and urban projects as well as research and development and assisting in formulating government policy and regulations for sustainable building practice and construction. David Lloyd Jones was responsible for a succession of building projects including: The Solar Office, Doxford International Business Park (1998); The Treasures of St. Cuthbert, Durham Cathedral (1998); BBC 21st Century Classroom (2002); Beaufort Court Zero Emissions Head Office for Renewable Energy Systems, Kings Langley (2003); Grange Park Opera House, The Grange, Northington (2003); Theatre, Sports Hall and Science Laboratories for Townley Grammar School for Girls, Bexley Heath (2005); Burgess Park Community Sports Centre (2006); City of London Freemen's School masterplan (2011); Highgrove Swimming Pool and Leisure Centre, Hillingdon (2012), and Heston Leisure Centre (2014). R&D projects have been carried out for International, European, National and commercial organisations and include: IEA PVPS Task 7: Photovoltaic Power in the Built Environment; EU Framework 5: RES Integrated Renewable Energy Systems Development Programme; EU REFRAME High Insulation Windows Programme; and Orange at Home for Orange (telecommunications) Plc, and the Classroom of the Future at St Frances of Assisi Primary School for the Department for Education and Skills.

In 2014 Lloyd Jones set up David LLoyd Jones Associates and stepped down as an executive director at SEA Ltd (although he remains as a statutory director and co-owner). Recent work includes a new Grange Park Opera House for Wasfi Kani at West Horsley Place, renovation and re-purposing the listed buildings at West Horsley Place and advice on reducing the carbon footprint of the estate, and the current new campus for The British College at Kathmandu, Nepal.

In 2019 DaeWha Kang, Kimberly Safford and David Lloyd Jones set up the registered charity Climate Change All Change which unites the imagination of school children with the experience of designers to create concepts that combat the calamity of climate disruption.

In September 2024, Studio E - which went into voluntary liquidation and began winding up in May 2020 - was strongly criticised in the official Grenfell Tower Inquiry report: "... it demonstrated a cavalier attitude to the regulations affecting fire safety.... Studio E therefore bears a very significant degree of responsibility for the disaster." While Studio E was no longer trading, it was not allowed to fully wind up because of its role in the fire.

== Recognition and awards ==
David Lloyd Jones was a Royal Institute of British Architects London Region Councillor from 1991 to 2004; a member of the Cabe (Commission for Architecture and the Built Environment) Schools Panel from 2007 to 2011 and is currently a member of the RIBA Sustainable Futures Group and a Trustee of the Pakistan Islamic Arts Institute. He is a Fellow of the Royal Society for the encouragement of Arts, Manufactures & Commerce (RSA). He has lectured at many architectural schools and has presented papers at innumerable conferences around the world, most recently at the British Council in Delhi, at the Sustainable Architectural Forum in San Jose, Costa Rica, at the UKTI Department of Trade and Industry (United Kingdom) sponsored Green Building Mission in New York City and at the Jerusalem Seminar in Architecture Series: Green Design from Theory to Practice.

Studio E won over 50 major awards, including:

- Winners the Queen's Award for Enterprise, Sustainable Development: Studio E Architects (2010)
- Sustainable City Awards Environmental Management in SMEs: Studio E Architects (2010)
- Green Apple Award: National Gold Winner Scotland: Inverclyde Academy (2009)
- BCSE Awards Best School Architect: Studio E Architects (2008)
- BCSE Awards Inspiring Design: Primary School: Larmenier and Sacred Heart Primary School (2008)
- Green Construction Awards: Small Project of the Year: Burgess Park Community Sports Centre (2007)
- CABE Festive Five Award: The City of London Academy, Southwark (2007)
- Prime Minister's Better Public Building Award: The City of London Academy, Southwark (2006)
- Queen's Award for Enterprise, Sustainable Development: Beaufort Court Zero Emissions Head Office (2005)
- Business Commitment to the Environment Peter Parker Award: Beaufort Court Zero Emissions Head Office (2005)
- RIBA Award: Beaufort Court Zero Emissions Head Office (2004)
- RIBA Award: Grange Park Opera House (2004)
- Regeneration Awards Innovation of the Year: Beaufort Court Zero Emissions Head Office (2004)
- Georgian Group Award: Best New Building in a Georgian Context: Grange Park Opera (2004)
- Civic Trust Award: Haileybury College Girls Boarding Houses (2003)
- RIBA Award: Haileybury College Girls Boarding Houses (2002)
- RIBA Award: Whatmans Field Bridges (2002)
- RIBA Manser Medal: Barnes House (2001)
- Eurosolar Award: The Solar Office, Doxford International (1999)
- Design Council Millennium Product Award: The Solar Office, Doxford International (1999)

== Publications ==
David Lloyd Jones has authored and contributed to many publications.

- Architecture and the Environment: Bioclimatic Building Design, Laurence King Publishing, London, 1998 was published under his own name. His work with Studio E has been covered widely in the technical and national press.

Studio E Authorship

- Renewable Energy Systems Head Office and Visitors' Facility: Final and Publishable Technical Report: EU Framework 5 Contract no. NNE5-1999-00352.
- Studio E Architect. Photovoltaics in Buildings. BIPV Projects. Department of Trade and Industry, UK 2000 Report ETSU /P2/00328/REP.
- Building Integrated PV Design Study: Solar Boarding House, Haileybury and Imperial Service College, Final Report: ETSU S/P2/00351/00/00.
- Studio E Architects, Photovoltaics in Buildings: Survey of Design Tools: ETSU S/P2/00289/REP.
- Studio E Architects, Evaluation Criteria for PV Integrated Buildings: ETSU S/P2/00267/REP.
- The Solar Office, Doxford International, Project Report; Final Version: ETSU S/P2/00275/00/00/REP.

Studio E Contributing Authorship or Project Contribution

- Green Design from Theory to Practice: Black Dog Publishing 2009.
- Good Office Design: RIBA 2009.
- Green Building Trends: Europe: Island Press 2009.
- The Next Generation – from Sustainable to Transformable, Architecture of Israel no. 78, 2009.
- RE-FRAME New Window Framing Technologies for Highly Insulating Glazing EU NNE5-2001-00149 (2008).
- Sustainable Architecture UK: RIBA 2007.
- One Planet Living, Alastair Sawday Publishing 2006.
- Designing with Solar Power: Images Publishing 2005.
- Guia Basica de la Sostenibilidad: GG 2005.
- Renewable Energy in the Built Environment: The Building Centre Trust 2001.
- Exploring Architecture, Buildings, Meaning and Making: V&A Publications 2004.
- L'integrazione architettionica del fotovoltaico: Gangemi Editore 2002.
- PV in Buildings: A Design Guide: ETSU S/P2/00282/REP and Max Fordham Associates.
- Case Studies: Photovoltaic Power Systems in the Built Environment: IEA PVPS Task 7.
- World PV Guide: Nedo, Japan, 2001.
- PV in Buildings: Testing, Commissioning and Monitoring: ETSU S/P2/00290/REP and Halcrow Gilbert.
