= Lee Harris (South African writer) =

South African writer, musician, and activist (born 1936)

- Born: 1936 (age 88–89); Johannesburg, South Africa
- Occupations: Writer; musician; activist; publisher
- Years active: 1970s–present
- Known for: Key figure in the British counterculture movement
- Notable work: Arts Lab; Alchemy Culture Shop; Alchemy Publications; Brainstorm Comix; Echoes of the Underground: A Footsoldier's Tales

Lee Harris (born 1936), is a South African writer, musician, and activist who has lived and worked primarily in the United Kingdom since 1956.

He was one of the few white members of the African National Congress, where he helped with the Congress of the People and met Nelson Mandela. After moving to England at the age of 20, he acted with Orson Welles and Dame Flora Robson. He wrote for the British underground press, including International Times, and he helped found the Arts Lab. Harris has been an instrumental figure in the British counterculture movement since the 1970s. He published Brainstorm Comix and Home Grown magazines in the 1970s.

== Biography ==
Harris was born in 1936 in Johannesburg, South Africa to immigrant Lithuanian Jewish parents. As a youth, he was one of relatively few whites in the society to join the African National Congress, opposing racial segregation at the time when the apartheid system was being enforced by the National Party, which had come to power in 1948. Harris helped with arrangements for the Congress of the People gathering in the summer of 1955, held at Kliptown, Soweto. The crowd of thousands was surrounded by two hundred armed police.

=== London ===
Harris moved to London, England, in 1956, at the age of twenty. He studied acting at the Webber Douglas Academy of Dramatic Art. In 1960, he got a role in the Orson Welles adaptation of Shakespeare's Chimes at Midnight, in which Welles both acted and directed. Harris also worked with Dame Flora Robson, understudying the lead and playing a small part in The Corn Is Green.

He later began writing plays. He described his first full-length play, Love Play, as "A boy's journey through the underworld of emotional revelation". The play was awarded an Arts Council bursary in 1966. It was performed at the Arts Lab, which Harris helped found in Drury Lane in 1967 with counterculture figures Jim Haynes and J. Henry Moore. John Peter's review in the Sunday Times stated, "Lee Harris's Love Play ... might have been inspired by some of Artaud's equivocal, visionary phrases: The theatre as 'The truthful precipitate of dreams'; 'The human body raised to the dignity of signs'."

During his time at the Arts Lab, Lee worked as a makeup artist for musician Frank Zappa and traveled on tour with folk rock group the Fugs.

Also during this time, Harris wrote articles and reviews for many underground publications, such as International Times, Oz, and Frendz. His work included an interview with San Francisco beat poet Michael McClure. In IT issue 52, Harris reported on a new play by Jane Arden at the Arts Lab.

=== Alchemy ===
In 1972, Harris opened a shop on Portobello Road, London, called the Alchemy Culture Shop—named after John Lennon and Yoko Ono's The Alchemical Wedding. The shop sells items such as incense, postcards, smoking accessories, and vaporisers. It was a gathering point for alternative Londoners at least through 2016.

In 1990, Harris was sentenced to three months imprisonment for selling items such as cigarette papers and pipes "believed to be used for the smoking of cannabis". The sentence was quashed on appeal.

=== Brainstorm Comix ===
In 1972, Harris met comics creator Bryan Talbot. After reading his work, Harris decided to publish Talbot's first project, following a protagonist known as Chester P. Hackenbush on his psychedelic cerebral journey. Brainstorm Comix, debuting in 1975 (under Harris' imprint Alchemy Publications), was ostensibly an underground comix anthology, but the Hackenbush story dominated the first few issues.

The fifth issue of Brainstorm, released in 1977 and titled Brainstorm Fantasy Comix, went in a new direction. It included work by Brian Bolland, Hunt Emerson, Angus McKie, and the first published work by John Higgins. Brainstorm ultimately published six issues, with the last one coming out in the summer of 1978.

Brainstorm Comix was nominated for an Eagle Award in 1977 for Favorite Professional British Comic Publication. The series is regarded as one of Britain's "landmark underground publications" and has been called one of the country's "landmark comic book series" overall.

Harris republished the Chester P. Hackenbush trilogy in one volume in 1982. He published a third edition in 1999, titled Bryan Talbot's Brainstorm: The Complete Chester P. Hackenbush and Other Underground Classics. Talbot, meanwhile, became a renowned graphic novelist, creator of such stories as The Adventures of Luther Arkwright, The Tale of One Bad Rat, and Grandville.

Brainstorm editor Mal Burns went on to launch the alternative comics anthology Graphixus and edited another notable comics anthology, Pssst!."

=== Home Grown ===
From 1977 to 1982, Harris started and edited Britain's first counterculture and drug magazine, Home Grown. It represented a defining moment in British underground culture. Lee was reporting on psychedelic happenings. He used Home Grown magazine to support the Operation Julie defendants, including work by Timothy Leary, Michael Hollingshead, Harry Shapiro, Brian Barritt, Mick Farren, Bryan Talbot, Julie Burchill, Peter Tosh, and Tony Parsons. Minimal profits, a dwindling market, and apathy led to his closing the magazine.

=== Megatripolis ===
The Megatripolis club was at the forefront of a post-psychedelic counterculture resurgence in the 1990s. Harris was asked to work as a consultant to the club; he invited speakers such as activist Caroline Coon, writer and drug smuggler Howard Marks, and Michael Horovitz, a poet and founder of New Departures publishing. The club scored a major coup in 1995, when Harris organised poet Allen Ginsberg's last live performance in London. Thirty years earlier in 1965, Harris had been inspired after hearing Ginsberg at the International Poetry Incarnation at the Royal Albert Hall.

=== Later work; Echoes of the Underground ===
At the beginning of the second millennium, Harris started being asked to do spoken-word performances in chill-out rooms around the UK. In 2002, he decided to release a celebration of his thirty years of counterculture in the form of a compilation album, including many of the artists, producers, and musicians he had met along the years. They included producer Youth; Raja Ram and Simon Posford, collectively known as Shpongle; Howard Marks; The Mystery School Ensemble; JC001; and Bush Chemist. He held an event at Subterania in Ladbroke Grove to celebrate the album's release.

During this period, he met poet Hicham Bensassi, who had also performed at the event. A few years later, River Styx invited him to record something for a project he was working on. The album, Angel Headed Hip Hop, was developed. They brought in special guests such as writer Brian Barritt and rappers JC001 and Koze Kozma. Hicham Bensassi wrote the music, and performed vocally on four of the album's songs. He remixed the song "Three men in a Boat" with Howard Marks. It had originally been released on the album 30 Years of Counter Culture. The album Angel was released in 2009 on Arkadia Productions and was distributed by Gene Pool/Universal Group.

Harris and Bensassi travelled the UK and Europe on the "Don't Hate, Create Tour". It featured a special performance in Paris for the fiftieth anniversary of the publication of William S. Burroughs' seminal work Naked Lunch. This event was organised by Oliver Harris, Andrew Hussey, and Ian Macfadyen. It accompanied the publication of Naked Lunch @50: Anniversary Essays, edited by Harris and Macfadyen. Lee Harris and Hicham Bensassi were inspired to create the experimental piece Hunterland.

Footage of Lee Harris has recently been included in the documentary Echoes of the Underground, which also features Jim Haynes, Brian Barritt, Henk Targowski, and Youth. The score for the film was written and performed by The Moonlight Convention.

After making the album Angel Headed Hip Hop and performing live through the UK, Bensassi started to digitise and compile Lee Harris' articles, play scripts, and underground writings. Harris' collected work was published as Echoes of the Underground: A Footsoldier's Tales, in 2014. The book also includes rare interviews with beat poet Michael McClure, the director of the musical Hair, Tom O'Horgan, the man who 'turned on' Timothy Leary by giving him LSD, Michael Hollingshead, and Harry L. Shapiro, author of 'Waiting for the Man' and the Jimi Hendrix biography Electric Gypsy.

=== 2016 London mayoral election ===
Harris stood as the Cannabis Is Safer Than Alcohol candidate in the 2016 London mayoral election. He was positioned in ninth place out of twelve candidates, obtaining 20,537 first-round votes (0.8%), and 67,495 second-preference votes.

== Bibliography ==
- Nigel Fountain, Underground: The London Alternative Press 1966–74. ISBN 0-415-00728-3.
- David Huxley, Nasty Tales: Sex, Drugs, Rock n Roll & Violence in the British Underground, ISBN 1-900486-13-X.
- Ian Peel, The Unknown Paul McCartney: McCartney and the Avant Garde, ISBN 1-903111-36-6 – p. 150, Chapter 12: "Onstage with Allen Ginsberg".
- Chris Render (ed.), The Best of Home-Grown, ISBN 0-9524350-0-4.
- Andy Roberts, Albion Dreaming: A popular history of LSD in Britain – Chapter 12 "Coming down again". ISBN 978-1-905736-27-0.
- Steven Russell, "The beat goes on", East Anglian Daily Times, 11 April 2009.
- Roger Sabin, Adult Comics: An introduction, ISBN 0-415-04419-7.
