= Bed-in =

Anti-war demonstration by John Lennon and Yoko Ono

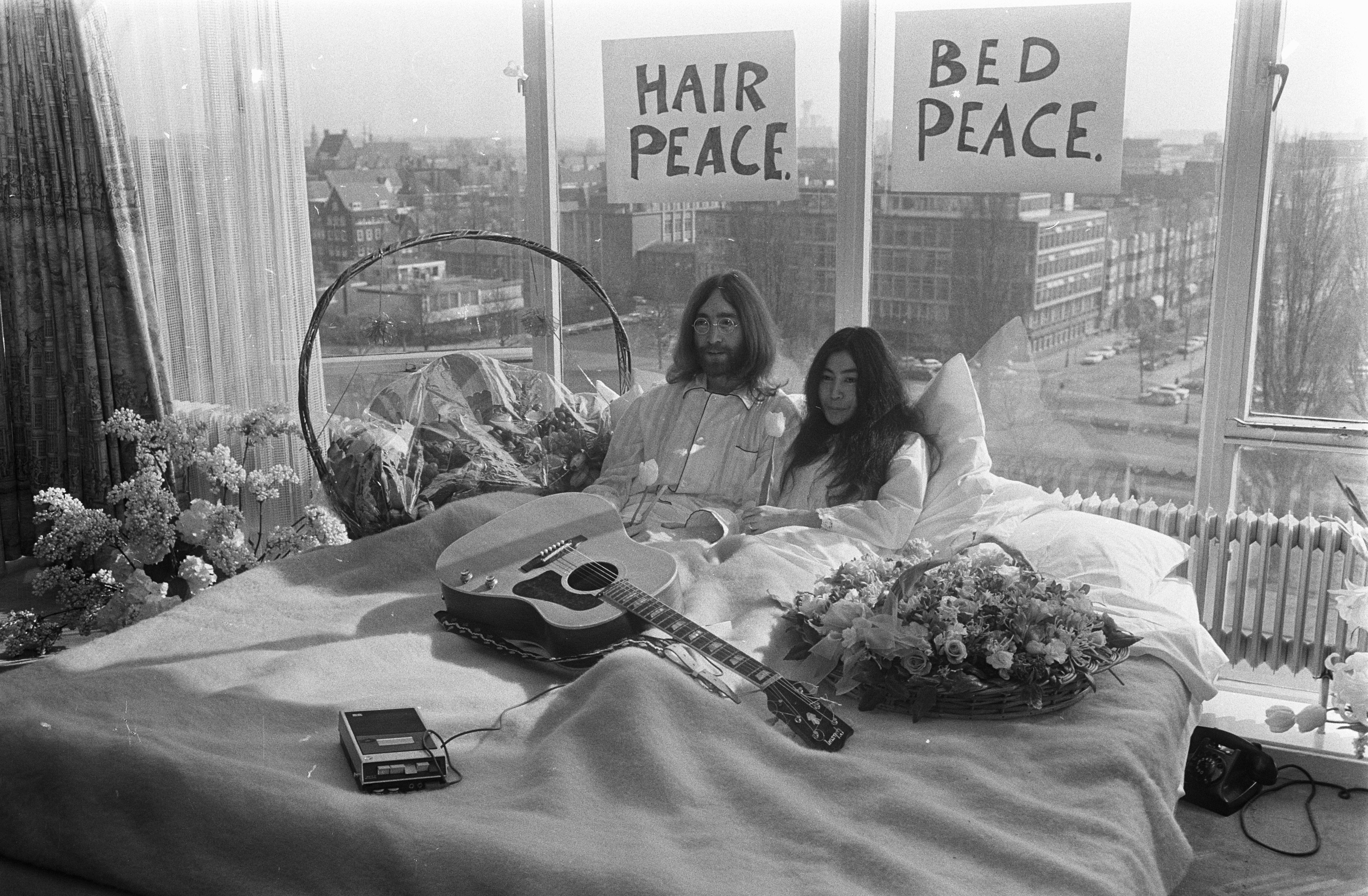
- John Lennon and Yoko Ono at the first day of their Amsterdam bed-in
- Date: March 25–31, 1969 and May 26 – June 1, 1969
- Location: Amsterdam, Netherlands and Montreal, Canada
- Type: Occupation protest
- Theme: Peace movement
- Cause: Vietnam War
- Target: World media and political leaders
- Organised by: John Lennon and Yoko Ono
- Participants: Timothy Leary, Tommy Smothers, Derek Taylor, Abraham Feinberg, Dick Gregory, Murray the K, Al Capp, Allen Ginsberg, Paul Williams
- Outcome: "Give Peace a Chance" recorded during the Montreal bed-in; Press attention; Others inspired to throw bed-ins

A bed-in is a nonviolent protest against wars, initiated by Yoko Ono and her husband John Lennon during a two week period in Amsterdam and Montreal as an experimental test of new ways to promote peace. As the Vietnam War raged in 1969, artists Ono and Lennon held one bed-in protest at the Hilton Hotel in Amsterdam and one at the Queen Elizabeth Hotel in Montreal. The idea is derived from a "sit-in", in which a group of protesters remain seated in front of or within an establishment until they are evicted, arrested, or their requests are met.

The public proceedings were filmed, and later turned into a documentary Bed Peace, which was made available for free on YouTube in August 2011 by Yoko Ono, as part of her website "Imagine Peace". Other bed-ins have since taken place – the most recent in 2018, when Ono was joined by former Beatle Ringo Starr, actor Jeff Bridges and then-New York City mayor Bill de Blasio, to participate in a bed-in at New York City Hall.

== Amsterdam bed-in ==
Knowing their March 20, 1969 marriage would be a huge press event, Lennon and Ono decided to use the publicity to promote world peace. They spent their honeymoon in the presidential suite (Room 702) at the Amsterdam Hilton Hotel for a week between March 25 and 31, inviting the world's press into their hotel room every day between 9 a.m. and 9 p.m.

Due to the couple's very public image, the Amsterdam bed-in was greeted by fans, and received a great deal of press coverage. Following the event, when asked if he thought the bed-in had been successful, Lennon became rather frustrated. He insisted that the failure of the press to take the couple seriously was part of what he and Ono wanted: "It's part of our policy not to be taken seriously. Our opposition, whoever they may be, in all manifest forms, don't know how to handle humour. And we are humorous." Ono also earned controversy in the Jewish community for saying during the press conference that Jewish women could have changed Adolf Hitler by becoming his girlfriend and sleeping with him for 10 days. It was acknowledged that some Nazi officials, including Nazi "First Lady" Magda Goebbels, had at one point in their lives had Jewish lovers.

After their nonconformist artistic expressions (cf. Bari: 33), such as the nude cover of the Two Virgins album, the press were expecting them to be having sex, but instead the couple were just sitting in bed, wearing pyjamas—in Lennon's words "like angels"—talking about peace with signs over their bed reading "Hair Peace" and "Bed Peace". After seven days, they flew to Vienna, Austria, where they held a bagism press conference.

During April 1969, Lennon and Ono sent acorns to the heads of state in various countries around the world in hopes that they would plant them as a symbol of peace. Their marriage ("You can get married in Gibraltar near Spain"), the first bed-in ("Talking in our beds for a week"), the Vienna press conference ("Made a lightning trip to Vienna...The newspapers said..."), and the acorns ("Fifty acorns tied in a sack") were all mentioned in the song "The Ballad of John and Yoko".

== Montreal bed-in ==
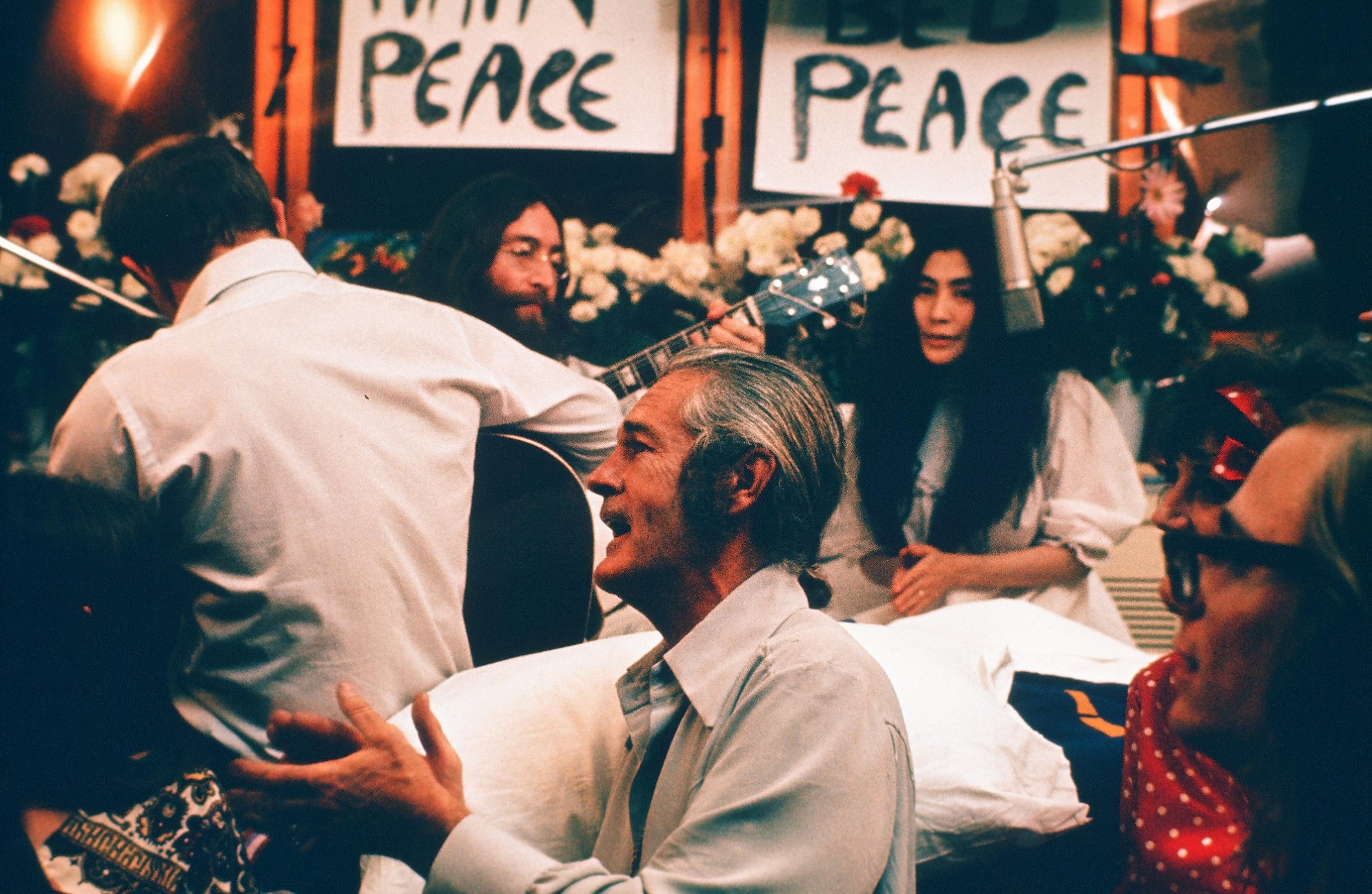
Recording "Give Peace a Chance". Left to right: Rosemary Leary (face not visible), Tommy Smothers (with back to camera), John Lennon, Timothy Leary, Yoko Ono, Judy Marcioni, and Paul Williams.

Their second bed-in was planned to take place in New York, but Lennon was not allowed into the U.S. because of his 1968 cannabis conviction. Instead they intended to hold the event in the Bahamas at the Sheraton Oceanus Hotel, flying there on May 24, 1969, but after spending one night in the heat, they decided to move to Canada. They first landed in Toronto and stayed at the King Edward Hotel. They interviewed with Canadian Immigration and were granted a 10 Day Visitor Status. The choice was between Toronto and Montreal. Since they needed the New York press coverage, they decided to move it to Montreal because of its proximity to New York.

They flew to Montreal on May 26 where they stayed in Rooms 1738, 1740, 1742 and 1744 at the Queen Elizabeth Hotel. During their seven-day stay, they invited Timothy Leary, Tommy Smothers, Dick Gregory, Murray the K, Al Capp, Allen Ginsberg and others, and all but the hostile Capp sang on the peace anthem "Give Peace a Chance", recorded by André Perry in the hotel room on June 1, 1969. Perry also recorded Lennon and Ono performing Ono's song "Remember Love" after everyone else had left the room. The Canadian Broadcasting Corporation conducted interviews from the hotel room. The event received mixed reaction from the American press.

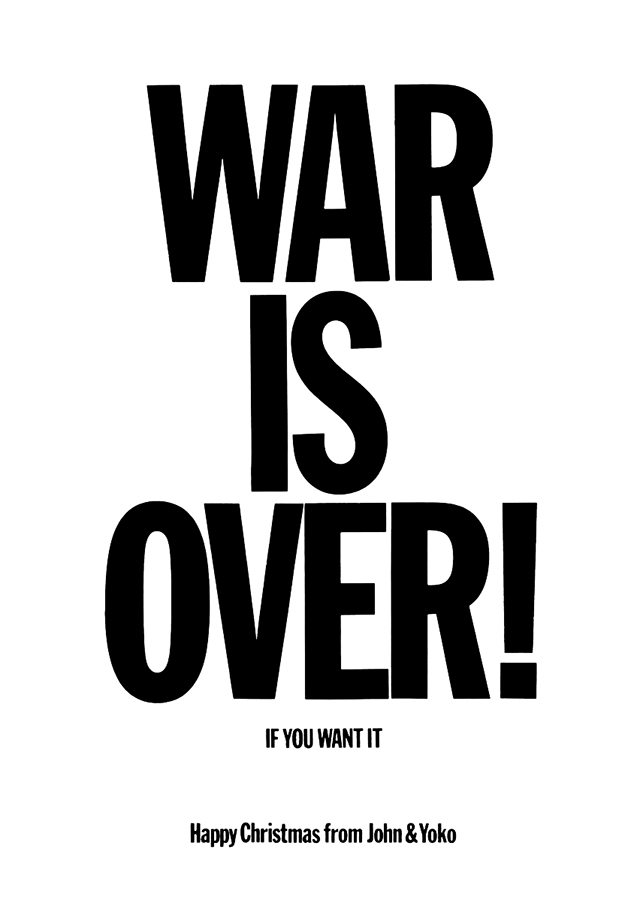
Billboard posted by Lennon and Ono in eleven major cities

In December 1969, Lennon and Ono spread their messages of peace with billboards reading "WAR IS OVER! If You Want It – Happy Christmas From John and Yoko". These billboards went up in twelve major world cities. The posters were designed by Apple creative director John Kosh.

== Others ==
The bed-in performance has since been re-interpreted and re-used in protests by a number of artists since 1969, most notably Marijke van Warmerdam with her gallerist Kees van Gelder at the same Amsterdam Hilton in 1992 and the Centre of Attention in 2005 in Miami. A fictional bed-in protest was also featured in a 2006 Viva Voce music video. In 2010 a main Liverpool's centre for the contemporary arts staged a 62-day event, Bed-in at the Blue-coat, which used Lennon & Ono's event as a template for 62 daily performances by artists, activists, community groups and others to do "something for a better world." Ono gave her blessing and sent a video message. The project started on 9 October, on what would have been Lennon's 70th birthday, and ended on 9 December, which marked 30 years since his death.

On September 13, 2018, Ono who was joined by former Beatle Ringo Starr, actor Jeff Bridges and then-New York City Mayor Bill de Blasio, to participate in a bed-in which was held at New York City Hall and which focused on promoting support for New York City schools.

== In popular culture ==
A bed-in is in the song "Don't Look Back in Anger" by Oasis. Lead singer Noel Gallagher sings "I'm gonna start a revolution from my bed / 'Cause you said the brains I had went to my head / step outside, summertime's in bloom". The first two lines, per Revolution in the Head: The Beatles' Records and the Sixties (which Noel was reading), were said by Lennon during a taped conversation he had at his room at The Dakota.

In the music video for the Marcy Playground 1999 song, "It's Saturday", the group finds their way to the bed of Lennon and Ono during their bed-in.

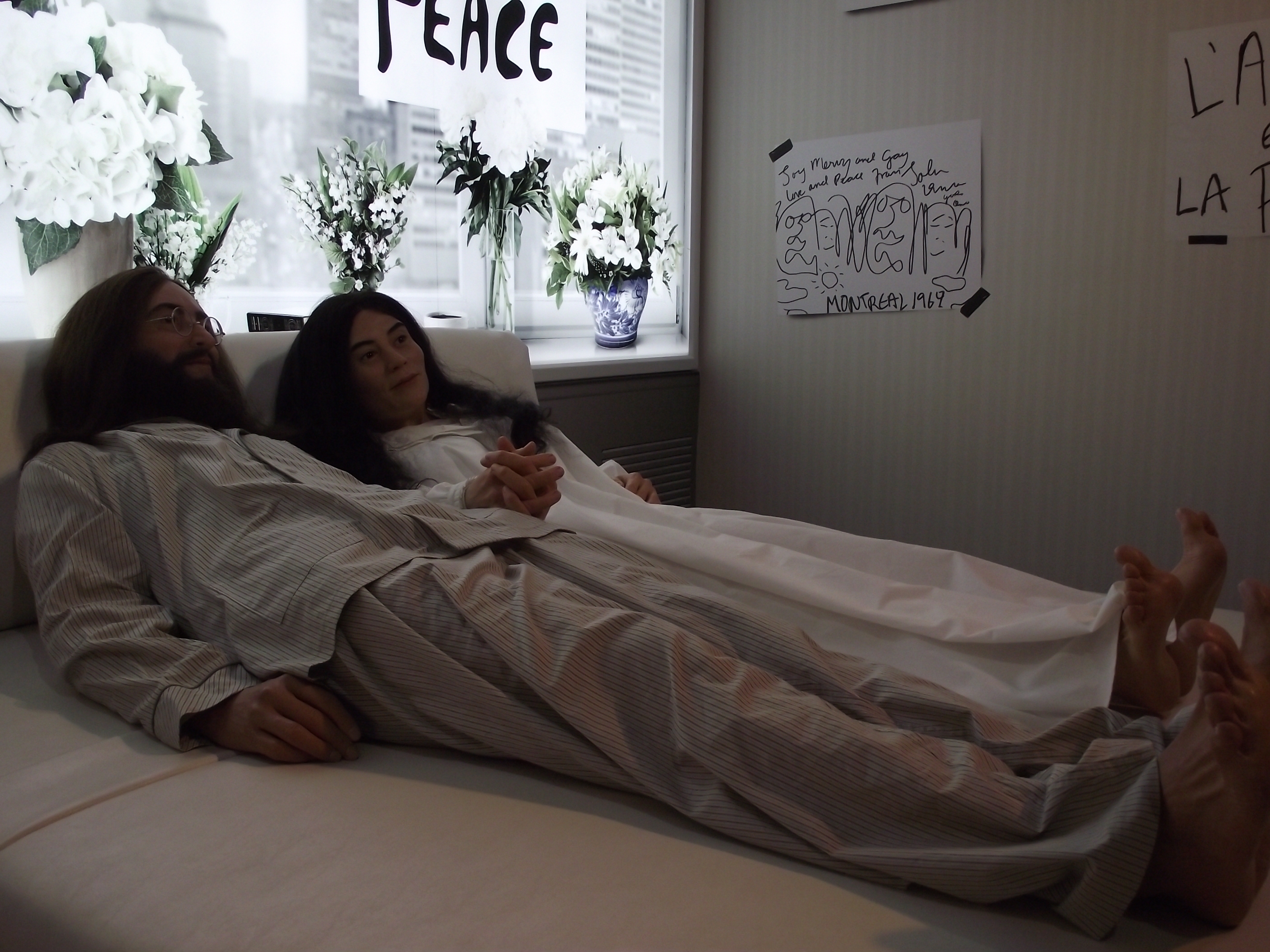
Wax figures of the Lennon's Montreal bed-in at the former Musée Grévin Montreal

Linkin Park members Chester Bennington and Mr. Hahn imitated the incident in a photograph taken by Greg Watermann in their book From the Inside: Linkin Park's Meteora.

In late 2006, Billie Joe Armstrong, lead singer of Californian rock band Green Day and wife Adrienne did a similar bed-in with a poster above their heads saying "Make Love Not War" in Spanish.

On Lewis Black's Root of All Evil, comedian Andy Daly exhibits a video clip showing that he has also attempted a bed-in to protest the War in Iraq. Trying to mimic Lennon and Ono's original, he climbs into the bed of an Asian woman, who pepper-sprays him.

Japanese pop duo Puffy AmiYumi made a homage to the bed-in on the cover of their 2003 album Nice.

American singer Jhené Aiko imitated the image with Childish Gambino of Lennon and Ono in their bed for her single "Bed Peace" off her 2013 EP Sail Out.

== Commemoration ==
In 2010, the city of Montreal unveiled a commemorative artwork in Mount Royal Park commemorating the famous bed-in. The work by Linda Covit and Marie-Claude Séguin is entitled Give Peace a Chance and features the words "Give peace a chance" in forty languages.

== See also ==
- Bagism
- Teach-in
- Sit-in
- Central Park be-in
- Human Be-In
- Die-in
- List of peace activists
