= Trommer =

Trommer is a German surname. Notable people with the surname include:

- Hans Trommer (1904–1989), Swiss film director
- Rosemerry Wahtola Trommer, American poet
- Wolfgang Trommer (1927–2018), German conductor
