= Jim Haynes =

American publisher (1933–2021)

James Almand Haynes
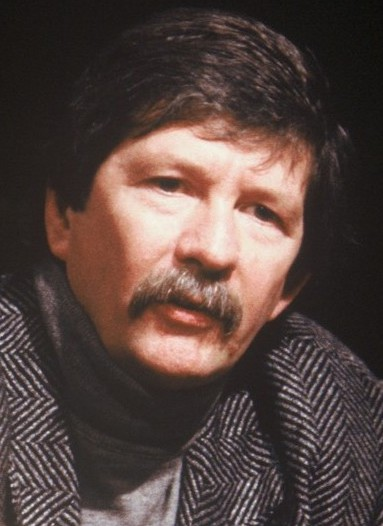
- Born: 10 November 1933; Haynesville, Louisiana, U.S.
- Died: 6 January 2021 (aged 87); Paris, France
- Occupation: Publisher
- Known for: Co-founder Edinburgh's Traverse Theatre, International Times and London's Arts Lab

James Almand Haynes (10 November 1933 – 6 January 2021) was an American-born figure in the British 1950s–1960s counterculture, beginning in Edinburgh, Scotland with the opening of The Paperback bookshop in 1959. He was also a co-founder of Edinburgh's Traverse Theatre, The Howff, and a co-producer of the 1962 Edinburgh Writers and 1964 Drama conferences. In London, he co-founded the underground newspaper International Times and the London Drury Lane Arts Lab. In 1969, he relocated to Paris and taught at the University of Paris, and for over 30 years hosted his open-door Sunday Dinners to international gatherings.

== Early life ==
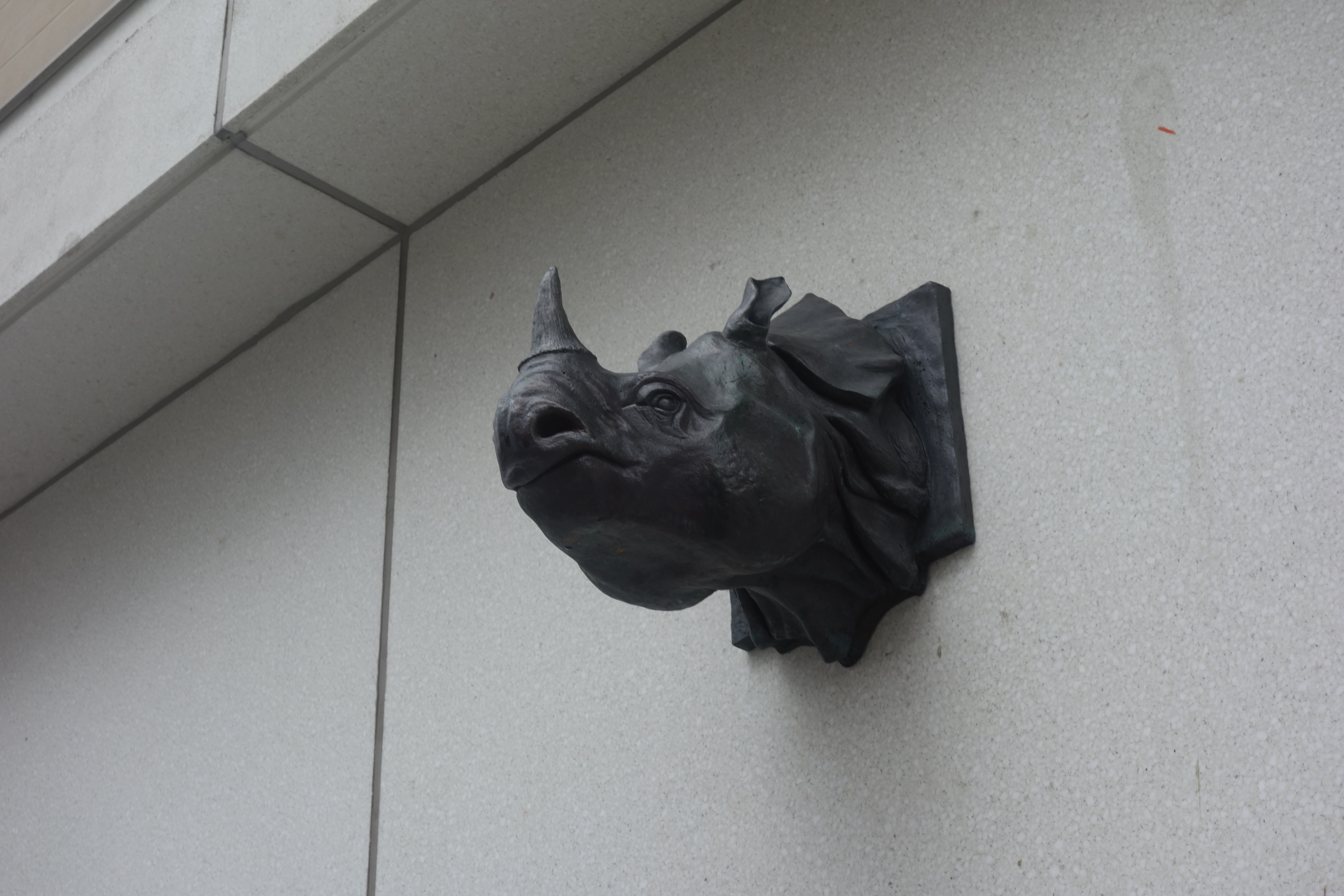
Edinburgh rhinoceros

Haynes was born in the United States in Haynesville, Claiborne Parish, in far northern Louisiana. Later, he spent his middle-school years in Venezuela when his father took a job there with Shell Oil. In 1956, Haynes served in the United States Air Force and was stationed in Kirknewton, West Lothian, Scotland, and decided to stay after his service ended.

== Career ==
=== Edinburgh ===
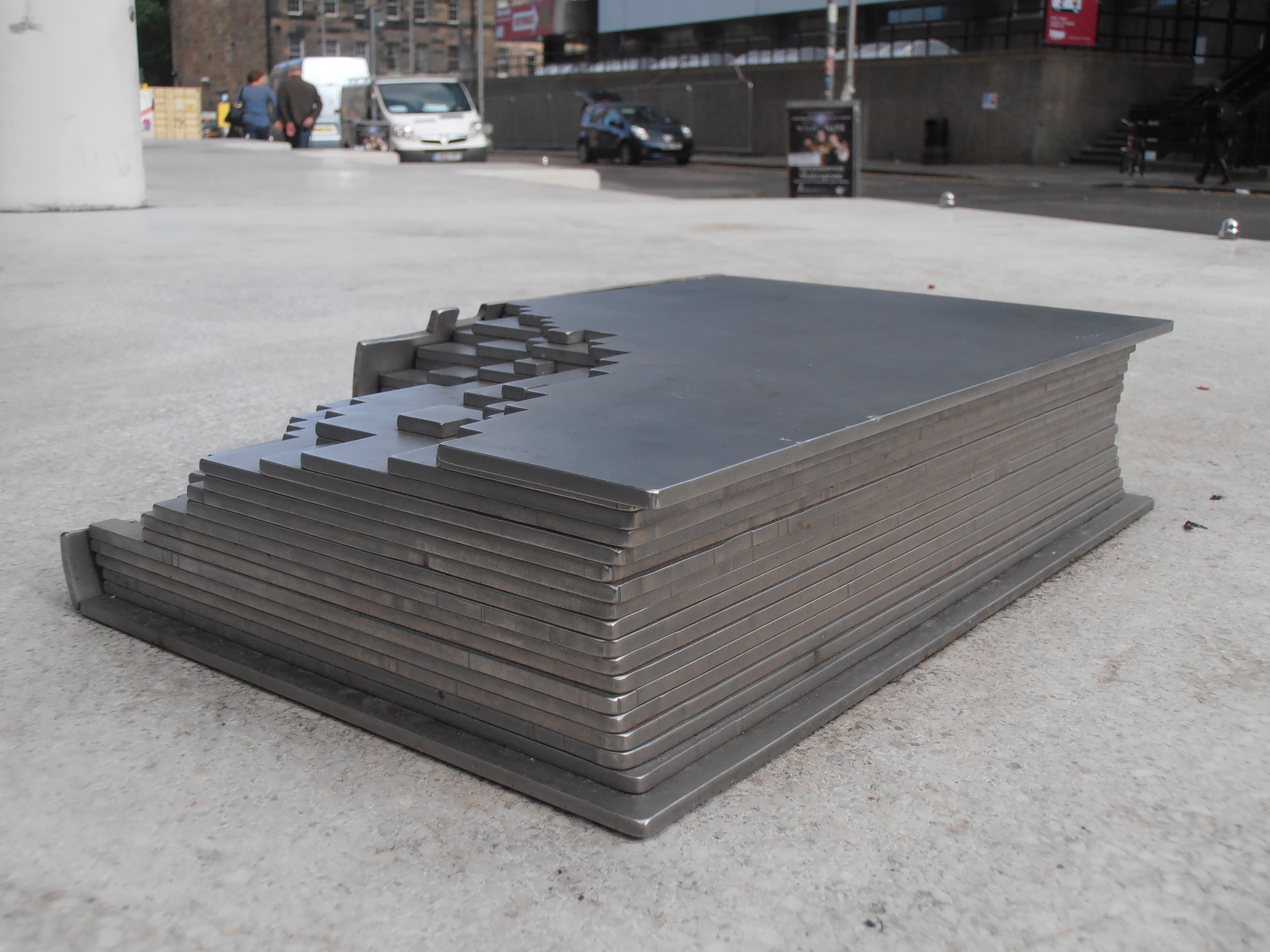
The Haynes Nano-stage (sculpture by David Forsyth, dedicated to Jim Haynes)

Haynes attended some classes at the University of Edinburgh and, among other writing and musical activities, helped to found the Traverse Theatre and the Edinburgh Festival Fringe via his bookshop 'The Paperback'. He opened the Paperback Bookshop in George Square in 1959, which is documented as "Britain’s first paperback-only bookshop". The bookshop was one of the first in the UK to stock Lady Chatterley's Lover. In 1962, Haynes co-produced the Edinburgh Writer's Conference with John Calder and Sonia Orwell. In 1963 Haynes and Calder and Kenneth Tynan created an International Drama Conference which ended in a scandal, a nude young woman being involved in a happening.

=== London ===
In 1966, Haynes relocated to London, in the middle of the "Swinging Sixties". He became deeply involved in the underground cultural scene, co-founding the alternative paper International Times, known as "I.T.", together with Barry Miles, John Hopkins, and others. In September 1967, Haynes co-founded the Drury Lane Arts Lab space for mixed-media, which closed in late 1969. That year he co-launched with William Levy, Germaine Greer and Heathcote Williams Suck newspaper in Amsterdam to promote sexual freedom; it was also distributed in the United Kingdom. The first issue contained a long and unrestrainedly descriptive erotic poem attributed to W. H. Auden and an explicit photo of Germaine Greer. In 1968 he co-founded Videoheads with Jack Henry Moore in London.

=== Paris ===
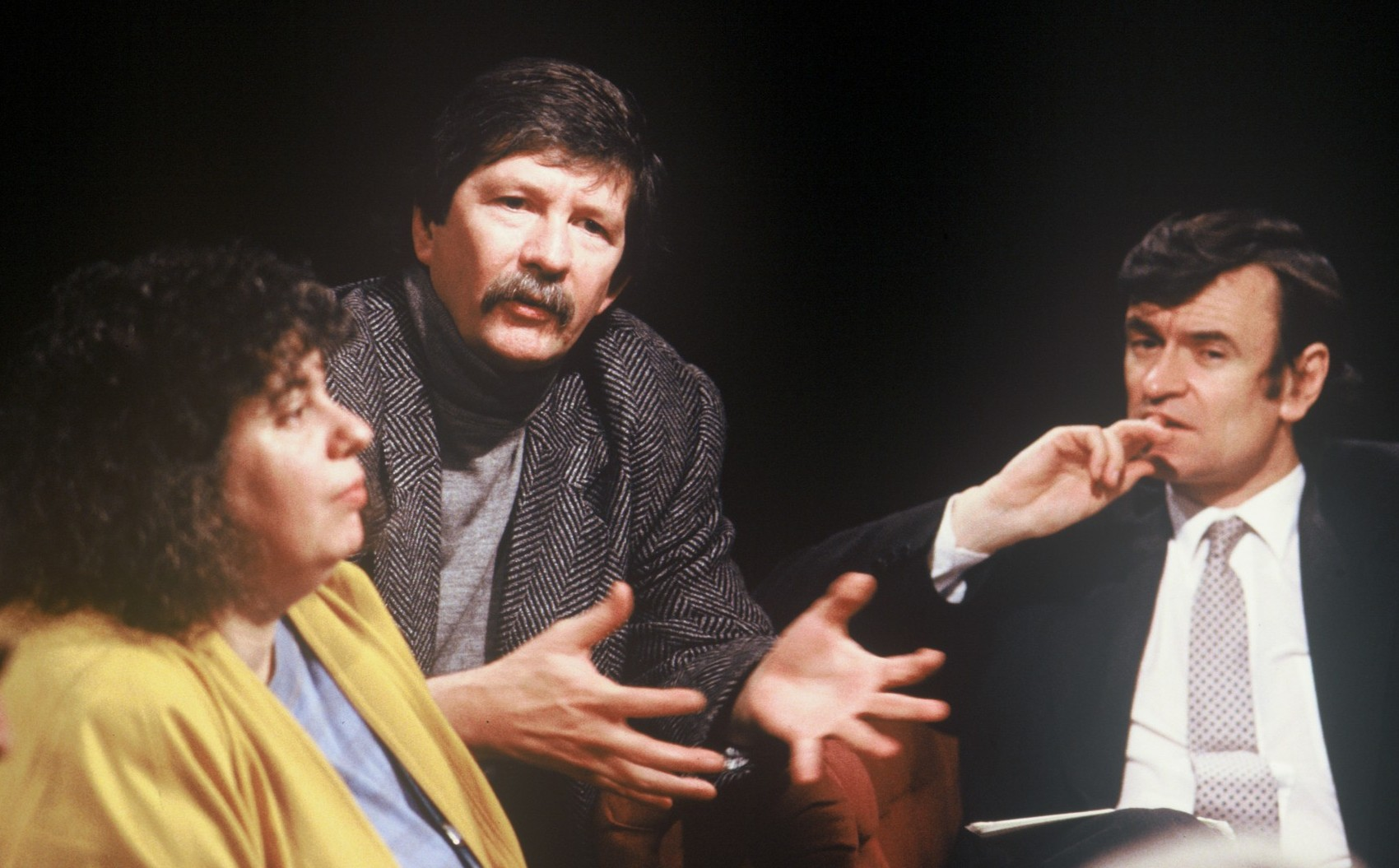
Appearing (centre) on TV discussion programme After Dark in 1988, with Andrea Dworkin and host Anthony Clare

In 1969, Haynes moved to Paris, where he taught Media Studies and Sexual Politics for 30 years at the University of Paris. He published an irregular newsletter about his life and times. In addition, he wrote an autobiographical memoir, titled Thanks for Coming. In 1970, he created and directed the Wet Dream Festival in Amsterdam. In 1988, he made an extended appearance on the British TV discussion programme After Dark alongside Andrea Dworkin, Anthony Burgess and others. In Paris, Haynes held a weekly open house dinner party beginning in 1978; at the time of his death he was estimated to have hosted over 130,000 to 150,000 people for the Sunday dinners. At Christmas 2009, Haynes and his open house parties were featured in British television advertisements for multinational foods company Nestlé: "When the coffee and 'After Eight' mints come out, Jim's always got a story to tell."

== Later life and death ==
Haynes had a heart attack in August 2011 on his way from Paris to the Edinburgh Festival but recovered. In 2018, Haynes was awarded an honorary PhD from Edinburgh Napier University. Haynes died in his sleep in Paris on 6 January 2021.

== In popular culture ==
The documentary Echoes of the Underground includes footage of him and featured Lee Harris, Brian Barritt, Henk Targowski, and Youth. The score for the film was written and performed by The Moonlight Convention. It is drawn from his book by the same name.

== Selected publications ==
- People to People: Czech-Slovakia/Hungary/Bulgaria, first published in 1993 by Canongate Press, Edinburgh. Edited by Jim Haynes.
- Hello, I Love You! Voices from within the Sexual Revolution, first published in 1974 by Jim Haynes under various imprints, Jean Lafitte Editions, Almonde Editions, Handshake Editions, edited by Jeanne Pasle Green and Jim Haynes. Translated and published in French, German and Italian. A semi-pirate edition published by Times Change Press in California in 1977. Traverse Plays, Penguin Books, London, 1966. Edited by Jim Haynes.
- Workers of the World, Unite and Stop Working! A Reply to Marxism, first published in a bi-lingual English/French edition by Dandelion Editions, Paris, in 1978. Later published in a German-language edition and a bi-lingual English/Russian edition in St. Petersburg. A new edition published by Glas, Moscow in English in 2002.
- Everything Is! Soft Manifestos for Our Time, published by Handshake Editions in Paris in 1980. Later published in German-language edition by Volksverlag in 1981. Translated into French and published in a small edition by Handshake Editions in 1981. Also Glas Publications in Moscow brings out a new edition in English in 2002.
- More Romance, Less Romanticism, edited by Jim Haynes, Published in an extremely limited edition by Handshake Editions in Paris in 1982.
- Thanks for Coming!, a participatory autobiography published by Faber and Faber in 1984.
- Round the World in 33 Days, edited by Jim Haynes, published by Glas, Moscow in 2002, in English.
- Homage to Henry, a homage to Henry Miller, a collection of essays about Henry Miller edited by Jim Haynes and published by Handshake Editions, Paris in 1980. Re-printed in 1982. New edition in 2005.
- Thanks for Coming! Encore!, a memoir, Polwarth Publishing, Edinburgh, 2014.
- World Citizen: at Home in Paris, Polwarth Publishing, Edinburgh 2016.
