= Hilton Amsterdam =

Hilton-branded hotel in Amsterdam

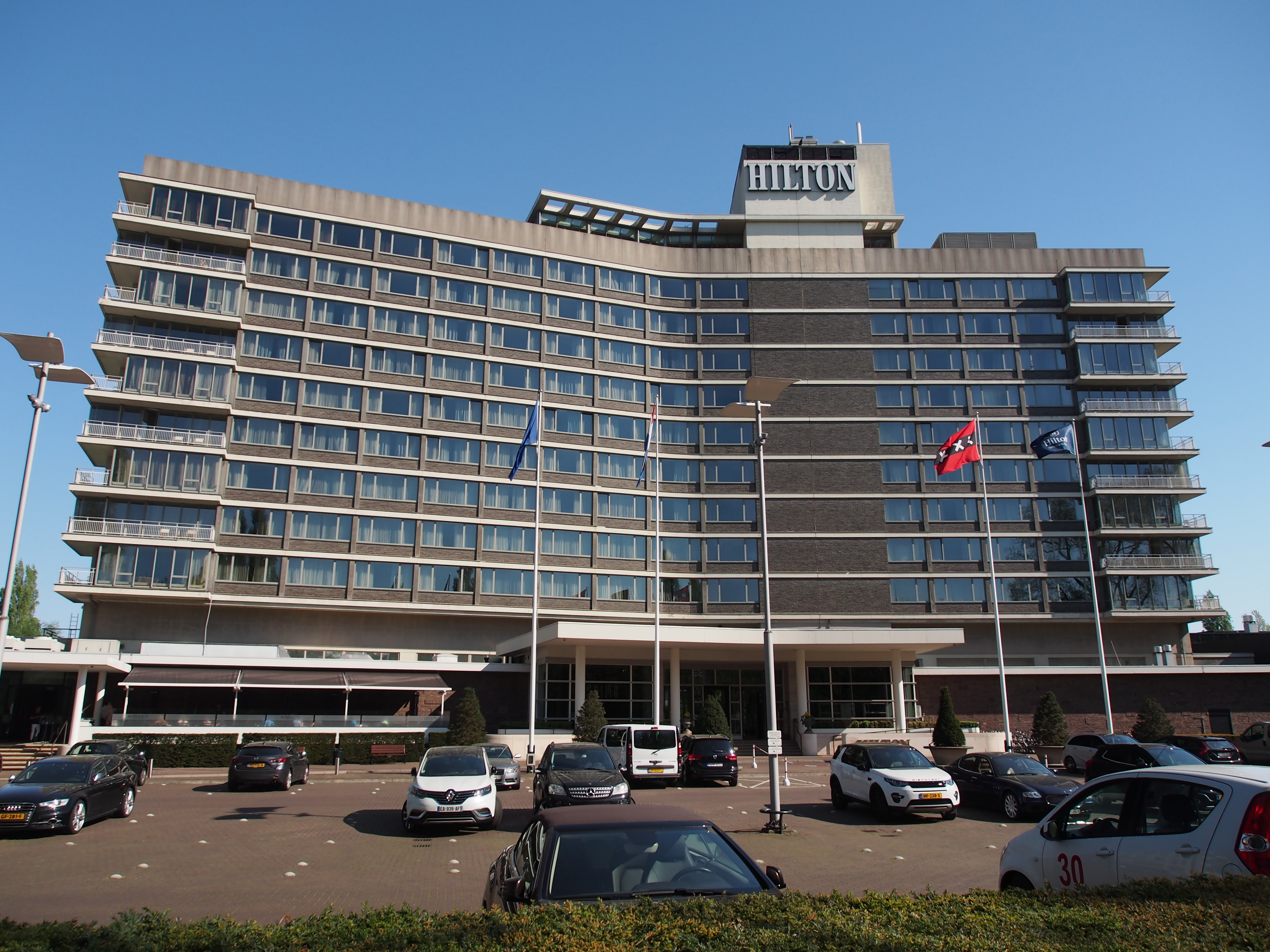

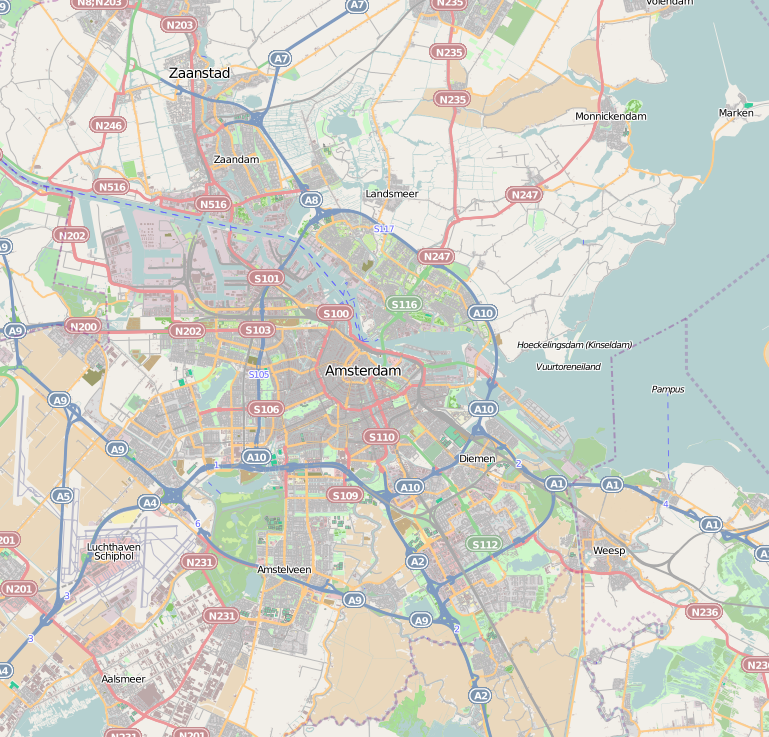
- Location in Amsterdam

General information
- Location: Apollolaan 138, Apollobuurt, Oud-Zuid district, Amsterdam, Netherlands
- Coordinates: 52°21′5″N 4°52′20″E
- Opening: 1962
- Operator: Hilton Hotels

Other information
- Number of rooms: 271

Website
- Official website

The Hilton Amsterdam is a historic hotel in Apollobuurt, in the Oud-Zuid district of Amsterdam, in the Netherlands. It is located at Apollolaan 138 along the Noorder Amstelkanaal, a canal connected to the Amstel river. The hotel opened in 1962 as the Amsterdam Hilton, part of the Hilton Hotels chain. It is known for John Lennon and Yoko Ono's "Bed-In" for peace which was staged in 1969 to protest the Vietnam War.

== Facilities ==
The Hilton Amsterdam contains 271 rooms. The interior of the newly refurbished rooms is designed by Nobilis Paris. The hotels facilities include a hairdresser, a bar area and several terraces. The rooms are divided between standard Dutch-style suites and the deluxe and executive rooms. Notable suites include the John and Yoko suite, the King Hilton Junior suite, the King Neptune suite, the Presidential suite, the Queen Hilton Junior suite, the twin Hilton Junior suite, and the Royal suite. The John and Yoko suite is a luxury 50-square-metre (540 sq ft) suite featuring a king-sized bed with Egyptian linen, and is decorated with memorabilia related to the couple.

== History ==
The Amsterdam Hilton opened on May 9, 1962 as the first hotel in the Netherlands from an international hotel chain. It was designed by Hugh Aart Maaskant in a V-shape, to emphasize the two major urban axes that intersect the Apollolaan and Minerva Avenue. It was completely renovated between 1996 and 1998 with a lobby design by Peter Ellis.

A number of notable deaths have occurred in the hotel area, such as the murder of the drug lord Klaas Bruinsma in 1991, in the Breitnerstraat, next to the hotel. In 2001 musician and artist Herman Brood committed suicide by jumping off the roof of the hotel at the age of 54. Extensively covered by the national media in the Netherlands, Brood's casket was driven from the Hilton hotel to Paradiso, Amsterdam, and the streets were lined with thousands of spectators. Gary Rhodes, a UK celebrity chef and TV presenter, started his professional career at the Amsterdam Hilton.

=== Bed-In for Peace ===
Knowing their March 20, 1969 marriage in Gibraltar would be a major press event, John and Yoko used the publicity to promote world peace. They spent their honeymoon in the presidential suite (then room #902, renumbered #702 during renovations) of the Amsterdam Hilton in a "Bed-In" between March 25 and 31, 1969, inviting the world's press into their hotel room daily between 9 a.m. and 9 p.m. Amsterdam art dealer Nico Koster was invited by Lennon himself for a solo shoot. Koster unearthed the lost negatives of these historic pictures in March 2009. The couple were sitting in bed in Room 702 of the hotel in Lennon's words "like Angels", discussing peace with signs over their bed reading "Hair Peace" and "Bed Peace". After seven days, they flew to Vienna, Austria, where they held a Bagism press conference. The hotel and the event is mentioned in the 1969 song "The Ballad of John and Yoko" where he mentions the Amsterdam Hilton by name and uses the following words: "Drove from Paris to the Amsterdam Hilton, Talking in our beds for a week, The news people said: Hey, what you doin' in bed? I said: We're only tryin' to get us some peace!".

== Gallery ==
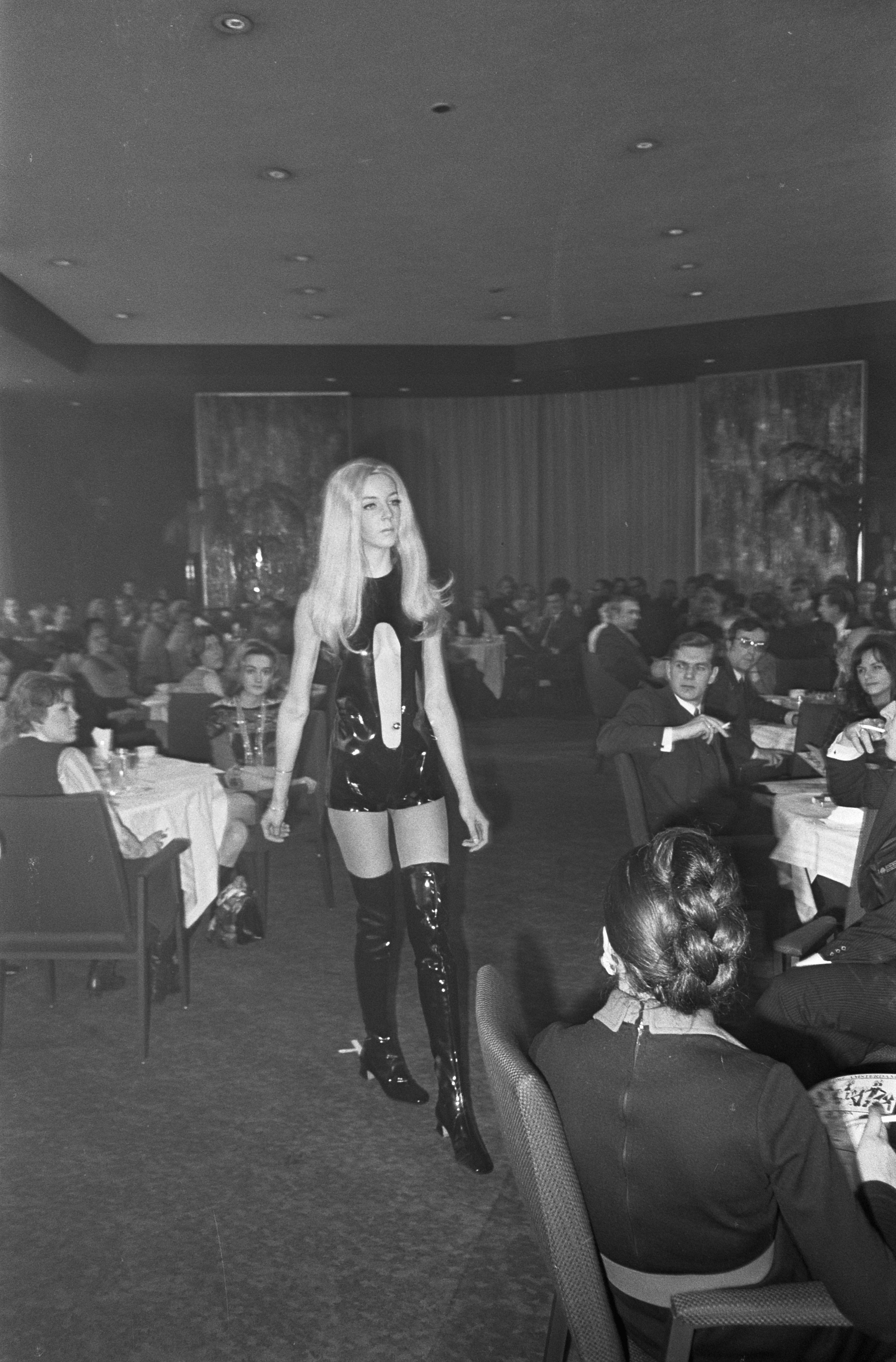
February 1969 national final for Euromode (photo: Anefo)

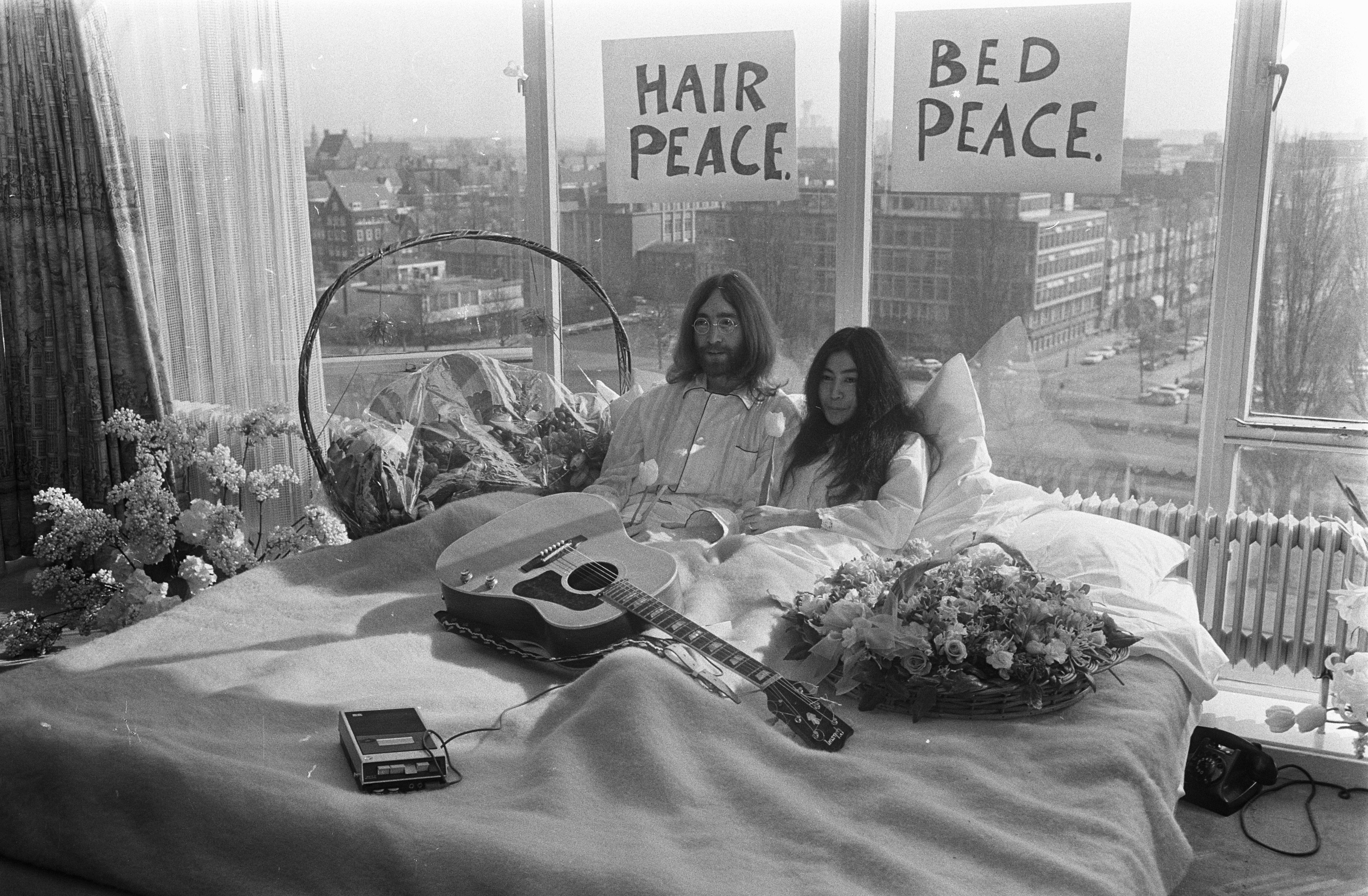
John Lennon and Yoko Ono lying in bed in the Hilton (25 march 1969).

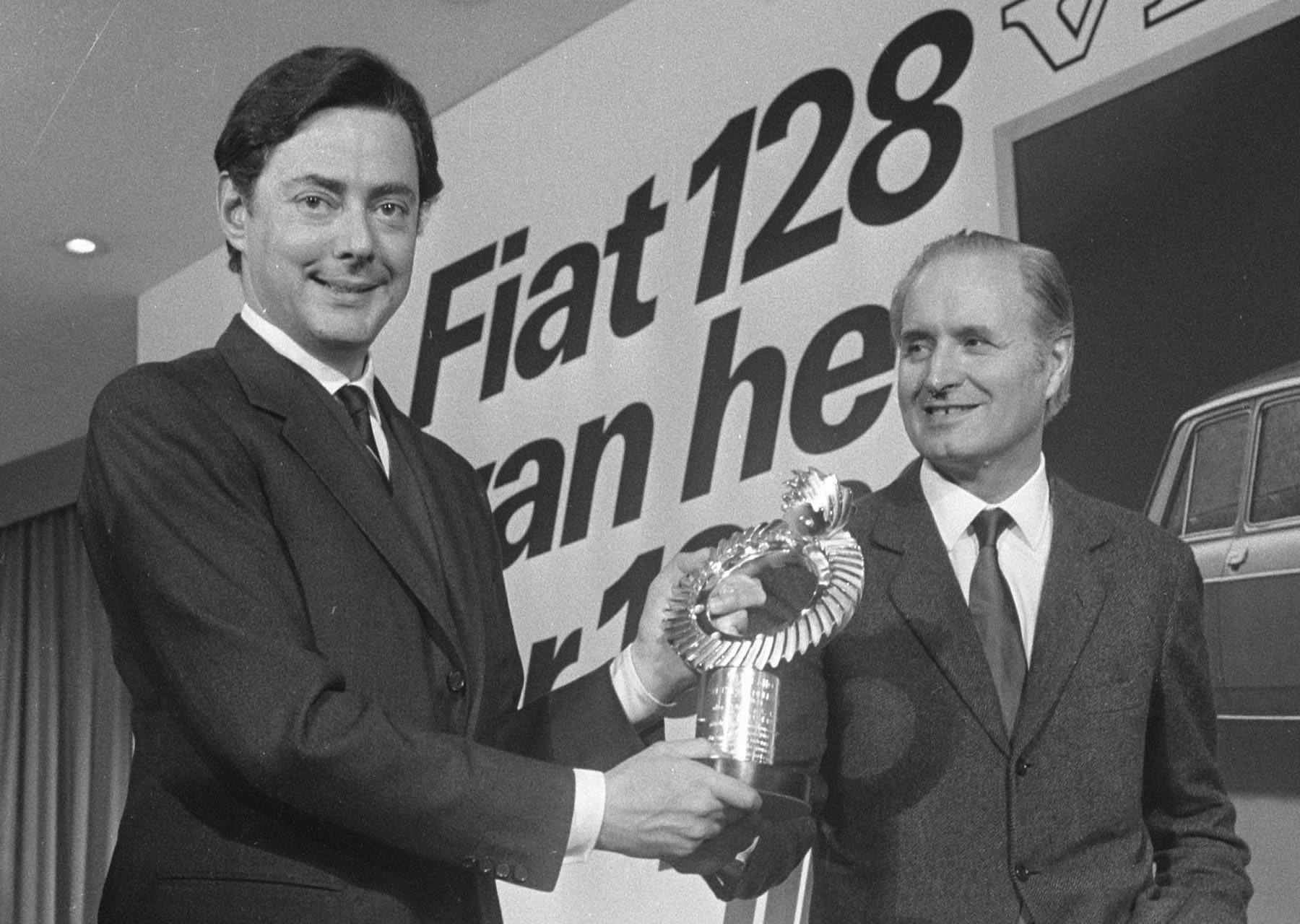
Umberto Agnelli and Dante Giacosa holding the 1970 European Car of the Year award for the Fiat 128 (5 February 1970).

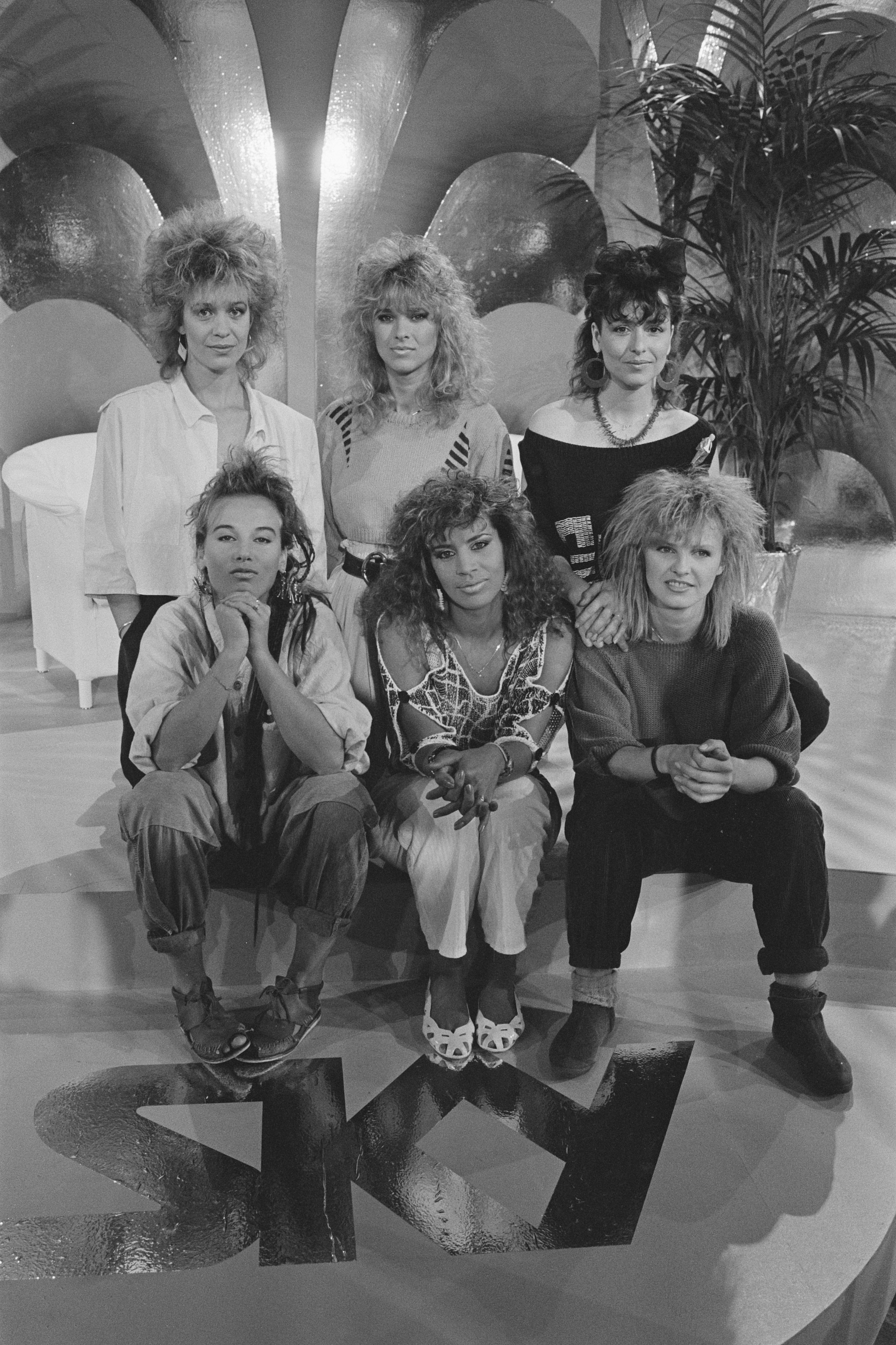
The Dolly Dots group in 1984.
