= Institute for Research in Art and Technology =

The Institute for Research in Art and Technology (IRAT, also known as New Arts Lab; Robert Street Arts Lab) was founded in London in 1969 by a group of artists and activists including painter/author Pamela Zoline, video pioneer John Hopkins, painter Biddy Peppin, film enthusiast David Curtis, arts theorist John Lifton composer Hugh Davies. Its early focus was on video, film, theatre and new media but this was subsequently expanded to include experimental literature, drama, sculpture and multimedia all based on art/technology crossovers.

In October 1969 the New Arts Lab opened on Robert Street, Camden Town, in a former chemical factory, with a screening of David Larcher's Mare's Tail (1969). This new arts centre, in addition to housing theatre, gallery and cinema space, also provided a base for the LFMC distribution office, screening and a newly equipped film workshop with a step printer and neg/reversal processor.

This building housed artists workshops which included electronics, screen printing, the video co-op, the London Filmmakers Co-op distribution office and workshop TVX's video theatre. It featured exhibitions by Stuart Brisley, Pamela Zoline and J.G. Ballard's Crashed Cars. The book launch for William Burroughs' "The Job" was held there.

For its brief life, J. G. Ballard, Joe Tilson and David Ormsby-Gore, 5th Baron Harlech, were among IRAT's formal patrons. When IRAT closed in March 1971, many of its organizers moved with the London Filmmakers Co-op to the Dairy, Prince of Wales Crescent.

The Directors in August 1970 included David Curtis, Hugh Davies, John 'Hoppy' Hopkins, John Lifton, Pamela Zoline (USA) with Biddy Peppin as Secretary.
