= Rosemerry Wahtola Trommer =

American poet

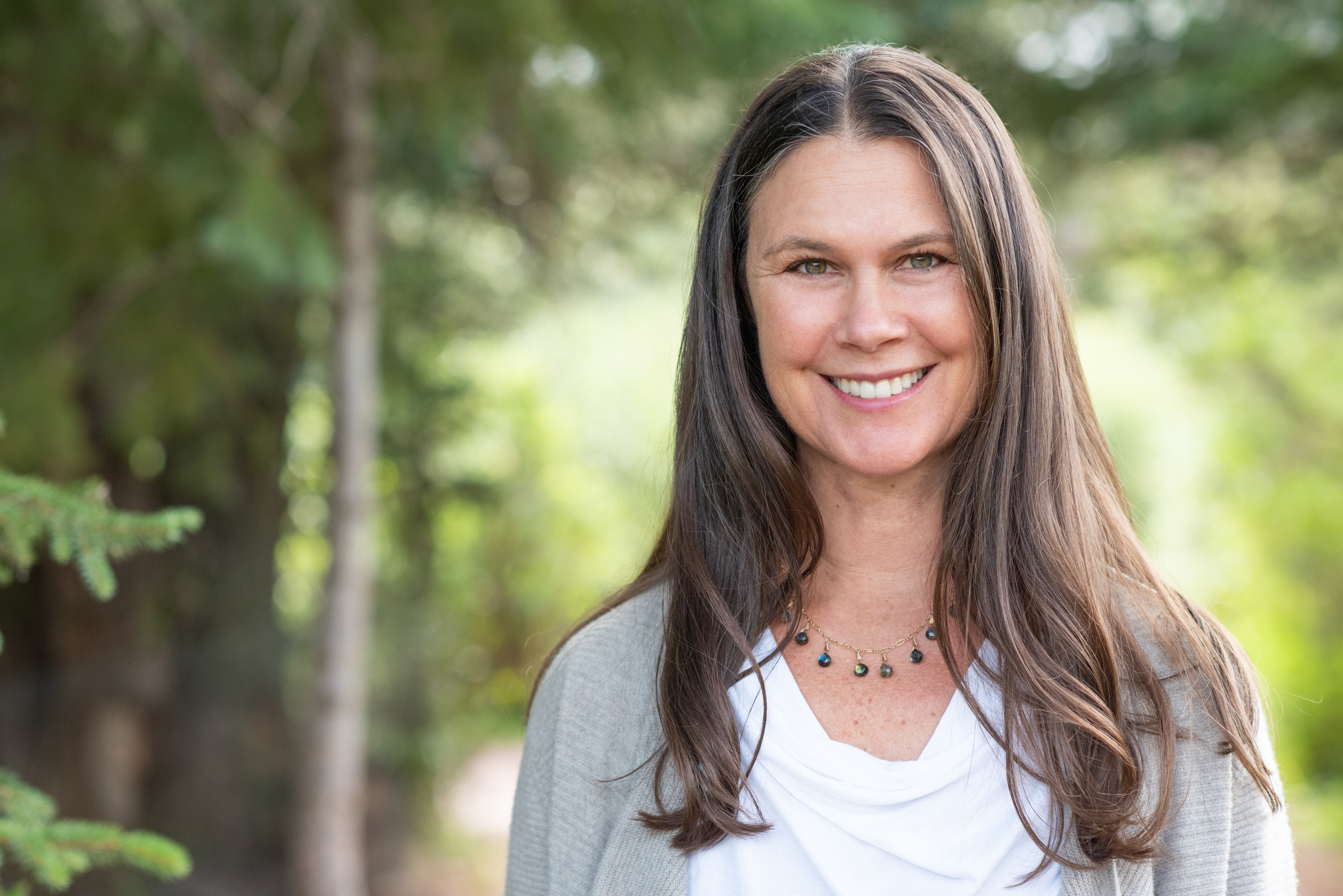
- Rosemerry Wahtola Trommer, portrait by Joanie Schwarz
- Education: Colorado College (BA, English, 1992); University of Wisconsin Madison (M.A., English Language & Linguistics, 1994)
- Occupation: Author

Rosemerry Wahtola Trommer is an American poet, associated with Colorado. She was Poet Laureate of San Miguel County, Colorado from 2006–2010, and was named Poet Laureate of Colorado's Western Slope by the Telluride Institute from 2015–2017.

== Published works ==
- The Unfolding (2024, Wildhouse Publishing)
- All the Honey (2023, Samara Press) ISBN 978-1-955140-02-7
- Hush (2020, Middle Creek Publishing) ISBN 978-1-7332163-7-1
- Naked for Tea (2018, Able Muse Press) ISBN 978-1-77349-016-8
- Even Now: Poems and Drawings (2016) (coauthor: illustrator Jill Sabella) ISBN 978-0-9962170-9-5
- The Less I Hold (2012, Turkey Buzzard Press) ISBN 978-0-945884-41-5
- The Miracle Already Happening (2011, Liquid Light Press) ISBN 978-0-9836063-1-4
- Intimate Landscape: The Four Corners Region in Poetry & Photography (with photographer Claude Steelman) (2009, Durango Herald Small Press) ISBN 978-1-887805-30-8
- Holding Three Things at Once (2008, Turkey Buzzard Press) ISBN 978-0-945884-27-9
- Insatiable (2004, Sisu Press) ISBN 978-0-9746898-0-7
- If You Listen: Poems & Photographs of the San Juan Mountains (with photographer Eileen Benjamin) (2000, Western Reflections Press) ISBN 978-1-890437-00-8
