= Bagism =

Satire of prejudice

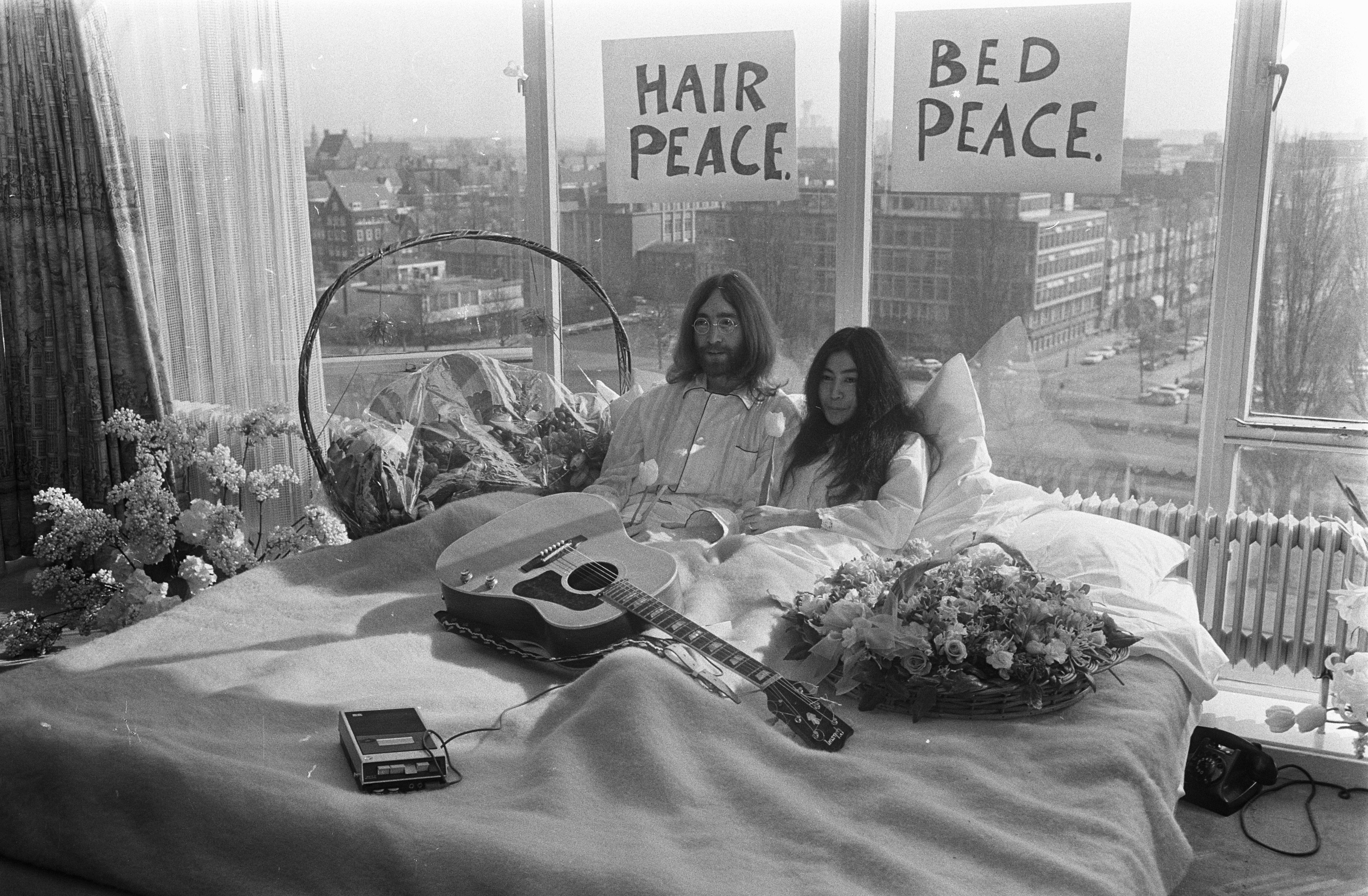
John Lennon and Yoko Ono during their 1969 Bed-in

Bagism is a genre of performance art satirizing social prejudice, where by living in a bag a person could not be judged on their bodily appearance. Bagism was created by John Lennon and Yoko Ono as part of their extensive peace campaign in the late 1960s. The intent of bagism was to satirize prejudice and stereotyping. Bagism involved wearing a bag over one's entire body. According to John and Yoko, by living in a bag, a person could not be judged by others on the basis of skin colour, gender, hair length, attire, age, or any other such attributes. It was presented as a form of total communication: instead of focusing on outward appearance, the listener would hear only the bagist's message.

== Purpose and origins ==
Lennon and Ono introduced the idea during a well-received press conference in Vienna on 31 March 1969, and explained it more thoroughly in a 14 June 1969 interview with David Frost. Bagism reflected the whimsical, carefree, and often comedic mood of their other peace efforts, such as their Bed-Ins. By catching the attention of the masses with its outlandish premise, bagism presented a social and political message to the world.

Lennon stated that "Yoko and I are quite willing to be the world's clowns; if by doing it we do some good." Ono said that bagism was inspired by the theme of Antoine de Saint-Exupéry's 1943 novel The Little Prince, which was "One sees rightly only with the heart, the essential is invisible to the eyes." She hoped that the bag (by hiding her and Lennon's physical appearance) would make their essence, or the essence of their message, visible.

== Alchemical Wedding event ==
The couple had earlier appeared in a bag, at the Alchemical Wedding event, an underground artists' gathering at London's Royal Albert Hall in late 1968. The event was put on by the Arts Lab and BIT (infoshop), which sought to challenge audiences to be participants rather than passive consumers. Lennon and Ono climbed into a large white bag on stage, sat cross-legged, knee-to-knee, hunkered down and closed the bag. They moved only twice in 45 minutes, hunkering further down. This was a strong challenge to the audience. "Musicians played, poets ranted, and John and Yoko crept into their white sheet-like bag on the stage and stayed there out of sight for what seemed like ages. I watched a baby crawl slowly by. And that was the bag happening. All mayhem broke out when a young female member of the audience stripped off her clothes and danced in naked delight. When the police were called and attendants tried to remove her, groups of people started stripping off their clothes in solidarity. There was a retreat and a truce was worked out, and no-one was arrested. The nude girl incident, with accompanying photo, made the front pages of the London evening papers," as Lee Harris noted later.

== In the songs of John Lennon ==
Bagism is mentioned three times in the songs of John Lennon. The first time is in "The Ballad of John and Yoko" where he refers to "eating chocolate cake in a bag", which was at the Vienna press conference, and the second is in the song "Come Together", where he sings "He bag production". This is a reference to Bag Productions Ltd, Lennon's public relations company, which derived its name from Bagism. The third reference is in "Give Peace a Chance", with the line "Everybody's talkin' about Bagism, Shagism, Dragism, Madism, Ragism, Tagism, This-ism, That-ism, ism, ism, ism."

The music videos for "Nobody Told Me" (at 3m 02s) and "Mind Games" (1992 version, at 2m 15s) both include a short segment of a person wearing a black bag which encloses their whole body, except their feet, while walking along Kings Road, London.

== Internet following ==
A website called Bagism.com was created (c. 1994) by Sam Choukri, providing John Lennon and Beatles links, photographs, rare sound recording snippets and video. At one point (c. 1996), the precursor to Bagism.com, a website focused on Lennon was sent a cease and desist request from the representatives of his estate over copyrighted Lennon content. After an unsuccessful appeal to Ono and the John Lennon Estate and the Dear Yoko petition campaign, Choukri decided to focus his efforts on less legally volatile content and the website has since been a hub for discussion, detailed discographies, letters, articles, fan artwork and poetry and other types of content.

== Liverpool John Lennon Airport ==
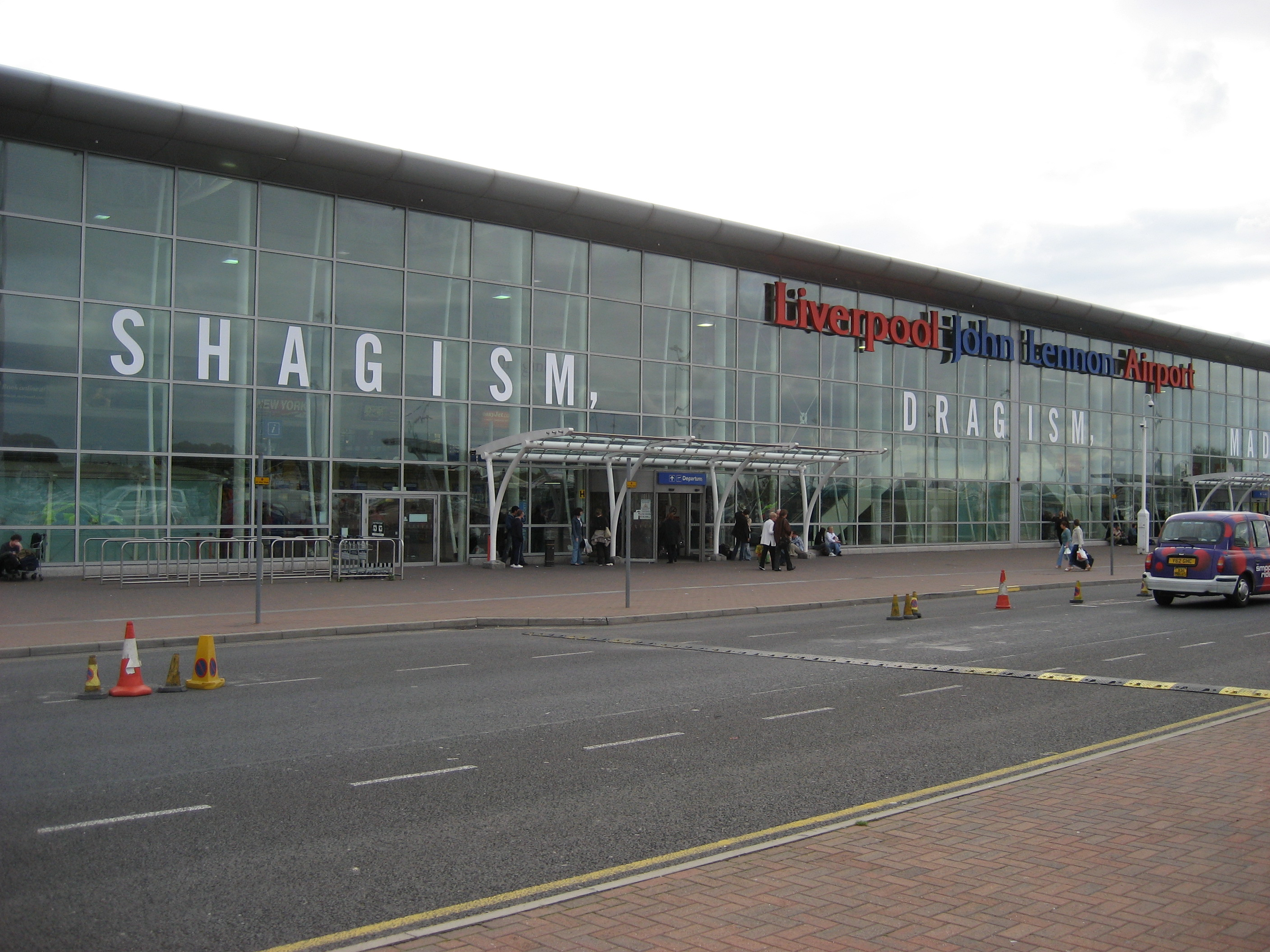
Front windows of Liverpool John Lennon Airport in 2006

In 2006, Liverpool John Lennon Airport had the words "Bagism, Shagism, Dragism, Madism, Ragism, Tagism" stickered along the front windows of the airport. This was done along with the branding of various Lennon lyrics around the inside of the airport.

== See also ==
- Bed-in
- Peace movement
- Veil of ignorance
