= Telluride Institute =

American think tank

- Motto: "The Telluride Institute fosters the transition to a sustainable world."
- Established: 1984
- President: Dan Collins
- Faculty: Nonprofit organization
- Budget: Revenue: $209,603; Expenses: $235,205 (FYE December 2015)
- Address: Po Box 1770; Telluride, CO 81435
- Location: Telluride, Colorado
- Website: www.tellurideinstitute.org

The Telluride Institute (TI) was founded in 1984 in the resort town of Telluride, Colorado, by John Lifton, Pamela Zoline, John Clute, John Naisbitt and Patricia Aburdene, authors of the Megatrends books, and Amory and Hunter Lovins of the Rocky Mountain Institute.

The original mission of the Telluride Institute was to organize and promote the first Telluride Ideas Festival, 1985's "Reinventing Work." Participants included left-wing British politician Shirley Williams, the Juilliard String Quartet's Robert Mann and then-Senator Al Gore Jr.

Since then, the Institute has held numerous Ideas Festivals, including 1988's "Perestroika," the first event in the United States to be co-sponsored by a domestic non-governmental organization and the Central Committee of the Communist Party of the USSR (the only political party permitted in the USSR at the time), and 1989's "Housing the Community."

== Major projects ==
Two Ideas Festivals spawned major projects:

=== Water ===
1992's "Water: The Upper San Miguel Watershed" gave birth to the San Miguel Watershed Coalition, now an independent nonprofit group whose 2006 Watershed Report Card inspired the Institute to hold a lecture series addressing the issue that summer. The TI also created three “living classrooms” where students at schools in the area can study the ecology of the watershed.

=== TeleCommunity ===
1993's "TeleCommunity" spawned the InfoZone, a project which made Telluride the first small town in the United States not affiliated with a university or corporation to have direct dial-in to the Internet through a dedicated Internet POP tied to a pervasive community tele-computing network.

Other notable patrons of the Ideas Festival include Soviet cultural ambassador Alexander Potemkin, novelist Edward Abbey, Rep. Newt Gingrich, Reagan strategist Lee Atwater, and Tom Hayden, the co-founder of Students for a Democratic Society (SDS), along with several United States senators and governors from Colorado and neighboring states.

== Other projects ==
The Telluride Institute has expanded to include many other projects since its inception.

In 1997, the TI invented the idea of Greenbucks, printed vouchers that one earns by working for environmental clean-up and restoration projects and that can be used as tickets to local concerts or at participating stores and restaurants. The institute administered the Greenbucks program in Telluride, Mountain Village, and other nearby towns.

In partnership with the Town of Telluride, the TI held its first annual black bear awareness week in 2005. It included lectures, performances and a community celebration on Telluride’s Main Street to educate area residents about the proper way to coexist with the local bear population. In 2006, the institute took over the organization of the annual Telluride Mushroom Festival, a popular event that involves lectures, film screenings, foraging trips, and cooking demonstrations.

In 2006 John Lifton and Pamela Zoline founded the "Centre for the Future" in the Czech border town of Slavonice. The Centre planned to hold, in September 2006, two simultaneous dual-language festivals: “Robot,” a gathering of science fiction authors and artists inspired by science from the US, UK and the Czech Republic, and “Cultural Landscapes,” examining the impact of society on the surface of the Earth and vice versa through panels and exhibits regarding architecture, urban planning, landscape design, land art and new technologies of mapping and representing topography.
