= Flashbacks (book) =

1983 book by Timothy Leary

Flashbacks: A Personal and Cultural History of an Era
- Cover of the first edition
- Author: Timothy Leary
- Language: English
- Subject: Autobiography
- Publisher: G. P. Putnam's Sons
- Publication date: 1983
- Publication place: United States
- Media type: Print (Hardcover and Paperback)
- Pages: 405
- ISBN: 0-87477-870-0

Flashbacks: A Personal and Cultural History of an Era is Timothy Leary's autobiography, published in 1983. It was reprinted in 1990 and 1997. The new edition has a foreword by William S. Burroughs, and a new afterword by Leary.

A double cassette album which contains Leary reading selections of Flashbacks was published under the same name in 1989 by Dove Books on Tape, Inc.

== Publishing details ==
Flashbacks was published by Jeremy P. Tarcher, Inc., Los Angeles, on May 1, 1983 (hardcover, ISBN 0-87477-177-3). It was reprinted in 1990 by Tarcher (paperback, ISBN 0-87477-497-7), and reprinted by Tarcher again in 1997 (paperback, ISBN 0-87477-870-0).

== Reception ==
The celebrity doctor Andrew Weil described the book as having, '...solid information about the psychedelic revolution of the Sixties' while the psychiatrist Rick Strassman said he used the book, '...to avoid repeating Leary's mistakes in his own research'.

“I hid from the press," Strassman said, "kept religion and spirituality out of my writings while I was doing research, avoided studying undergraduates, studied no more than one student per department if I did use students as volunteers… and made certain my data were more important than anything else”.

John Higgs suggests that Flashbacks contains, '...embellishments, point scoring and omissions'. He suggests however, that 'despite its flaws, there is still much about the book to praise'. Leary's biographer Robert Greenfield writes that much of what Leary "reported as fact in Flashbacks is pure fantasy".
