= Pamela Zoline =

American writer and painter (born 1941)

Pamela Zoline (or Pamela Lifton-Zoline; born on June 20, 1941) is an American science fiction writer, painter, and activist.

== Background ==
Zoline was born in Chicago, Illinois but lived in the United Kingdom, especially London, for the first two decades of her life. She studied at the Slade School of Art in London. She then moved back to the United States, planting roots in Telluride, CO, where she has now lived for almost 50 years.

== Writing ==
Zoline is admired for her experimental approach to both the form of the short story and the genre of science fiction, especially for using the language of science to interrogate the scientific world view. Among science fiction fans, she is best known for her short story "The Heat Death of the Universe", published in 1967 in New Worlds under the name P. A. Zoline. Called a "classic" of the genre by contemporary scholars, it has been frequently reprinted since its original publication.

"Heat Death" is structured in a loosely encyclopedic style, with 54 numbered paragraphs narrated in a deliberately matter-of-fact third-person voice. It centers on a day in the life of middle-class housewife Sarah Boyle as she goes about preparing her children's breakfast and organizing a birthday party. Boyle's domestic sphere is presented as a possibly closed system analogous to the universe itself, and Boyle as subject to the ravages of literal and metaphorical entropy. As the narrative veers back and forth among scientific explanations, descriptions of household events, and philosophical speculation, the cumulative effect is of a mind and a culture on the verge of collapse.

Zoline went on to publish further stories in magazines including The New SF, Likely Stories, and Interzone. She has also written a children's book (Annika and the Wolves), libretti for two operas (Harry Houdini and the False and True Occult, The Forbidden Experiment), and original science fiction radio plays for the Telluride Science Fiction Project. Along with science fiction writer John Sladek, she was an editor of and contributor to two issues of Ronald Reagan: The Magazine of Poetry (1968).

== Art ==
Zoline was formally trained as a painter during her time at the Slade School of Art. Her style blends the natural and supernatural, often experimenting with the interplay between the two. In Zoline’s words, “Art is meant to be practical and illuminating, to move the furniture of the world around.”

She is the Mountainfilm Festival 2024 mural artist and very active member of the Telluride art community. Zoline’s mural for this year’s festival depicts a man dwarfing his parents and their home during a visit to their New York apartment. It is modeled after Diane Arbus’ 1970 photograph A Jewish Giant at Home with his Parents in the Bronx, New York.

Zoline has long been a defender of murals and other art in Telluride’s public spaces. She is a believer in the conversations they spark and perspectives they challenge. In defense of allowing murals painted for the Mountainfilm Festival to remain on local buildings beyond the dates of the festival, Zoline argued, “The fact that we’re a historic district doesn’t mean that history stopped in the era of significance. We, right now, are making the history for the folks who come after us.”

== Activism ==
Zoline is an advocate for environmental education and protection at the grassroots and institutional levels, particularly as it relates to the Rocky Mountains. In addition to her co-founding of the Telluride Institute, her writing and art are also reflective of this. In a 2024 interview, Zoline summed her philosophy on activism stating, “I don’t think there’s going to be any future that’s not radical.”

== Personal life ==
Zoline and her husband, John Lifton-Zoline (also known as John Lifton), have lived in Telluride, Colorado since the late 1960s. She and John raised three children here, Abby, Jos, and Gabe. In 1984 she co-founded the Telluride Institute with Lifton and others.

== Works ==
- The Heat Death of the Universe and Other Stories, 1967 (short story collection).
- The Holland of the Mind, 1969.
- Sheep. Likely Stories: A Collection of Untraditional Fiction. Treacle press, 1981.
- Annika and the Wolves. Coffee House Press, 1985.
- Instructions for Exiting This Building in Case of Fire. Interzone #12 1985
- Busy About The Tree Of Life. The Women's press, 1988.
- Aulde Fleet. Polder: A Festschrift for John Clute and Judith Clute. Old Earth Press, 2006
