= John Lifton =

British artist

John Lifton is an artist and theorist whose work explores the relationships between art, science, the environment and technology. He was a founder of both the London New Arts Lab (1968), which focused on film and video art, and the Institute for Research in Art and Technology (IRAT) as dissident alternatives to the original Arts Lab (London). The latter became a center for film, video, sculpture, experimental literature and avant-garde arts-science/arts-technology crossovers. In the 1970s, Lifton moved to the Rocky Mountains and in 1977 he co-founded the Telluride Institute.

== Selected external links ==
- Meyer, Chris (Fall 1992). "Composing in the Information Age". Whole Earth Review (76). Archived from the original on 10 September 2005 – via FindArticles.
- "Green Music" (1976). Article in Psychobotany.
- Collaboration with Richard Lowenberg in "Secret Life of Plants" (1976).
- Telluride Institute website
- Role in helping found the Institute for Research and Art and Technology and the New Arts Lab in "A History of Artists' Film and Video in Britain." Central St. Martin's College of Art and Design, London.
- Collaboration in founding the New Arts Lab and IRAT as a dissident alternative to the Covent Garden Arts Lab. In a discussion of J.G. Ballard's "Crashed Cars" exhibition (1970) by Simon Ford
- Biographical sketch in "Encyclopedia of Life" Symposium (2004).
