= Brian Barritt =

British writer and artist

- Born: Brian Barritt; 29 November 1934; Coventry, England
- Died: 30 January 2011 (aged 76)
- Occupation: Writer
- Writing career
- Genre: Psychedelia
- Notable work: Whisper

Brian Sydney Barritt (1934–2011) was an English author, artist, and counterculture figure. He served in the British army, and was a friend and collaborator to such notables as Timothy Leary, William Burroughs, and Alex Trocchi. He was particularly active in the Beatnik, psychedelic, and Krautrock scenes.

== Books ==
Barritt was the author of several books, including Whisper, The Road of Excess: A Psychedelic Autobiography and The Nabob of Bombasta. He also collaborated with Timothy Leary on his book, Confessions of a Hope Fiend.

== Relationship to Timothy Leary ==
Barritt first made contact with Leary when Leary was on the run after his escape from prison. Barritt wrote to Leary in Algeria, asking him to write a foreword to the then unpublished, Whisper. Leary had seen parts of the book before which had been handed to him whilst he was a prisoner at San Luis Obispo, USA. By the time Leary received his letter, Barritt was already in Algiers waiting to see him. Their relationship deteriorated by the early 1980s with Leary describing Barritt as a 'lying junky' in his 1983 autobiography, Flashbacks.

== Collaborations with musicians ==
Barritt collaborated with Martin Glover from Killing Joke on his novel, The Nabob of Bombasta. He was later introduced to the rave scene by The Orb.
