= Linda Covit =

Canadian sculptor

- Born: 1948 (age 77–78); Montreal, Quebec
- Known for: sculptor

Linda Covit (born 1948) is a Canadian sculptor known for her public artworks.

== Public artworks ==
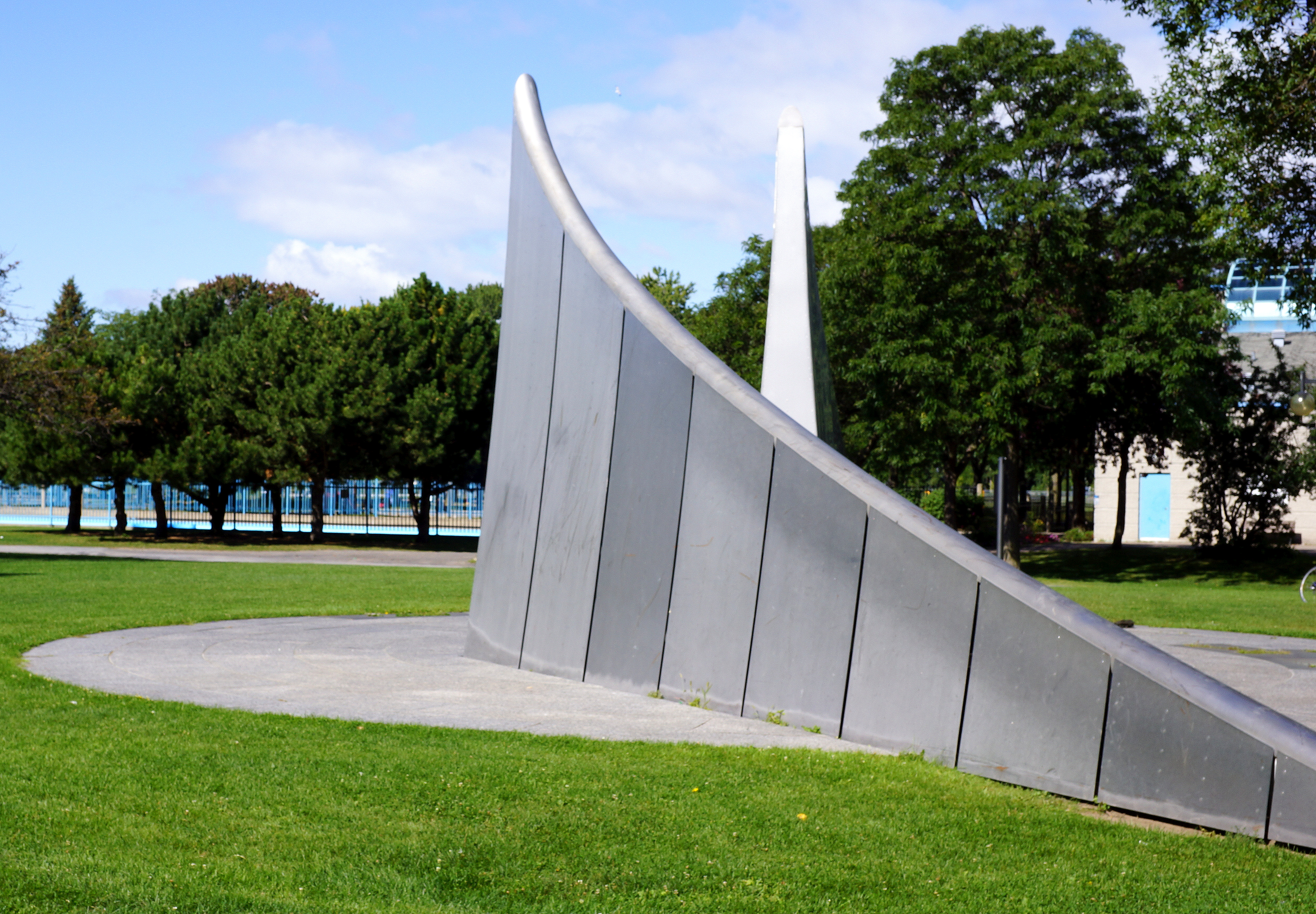
Caesura, by Linda Covit

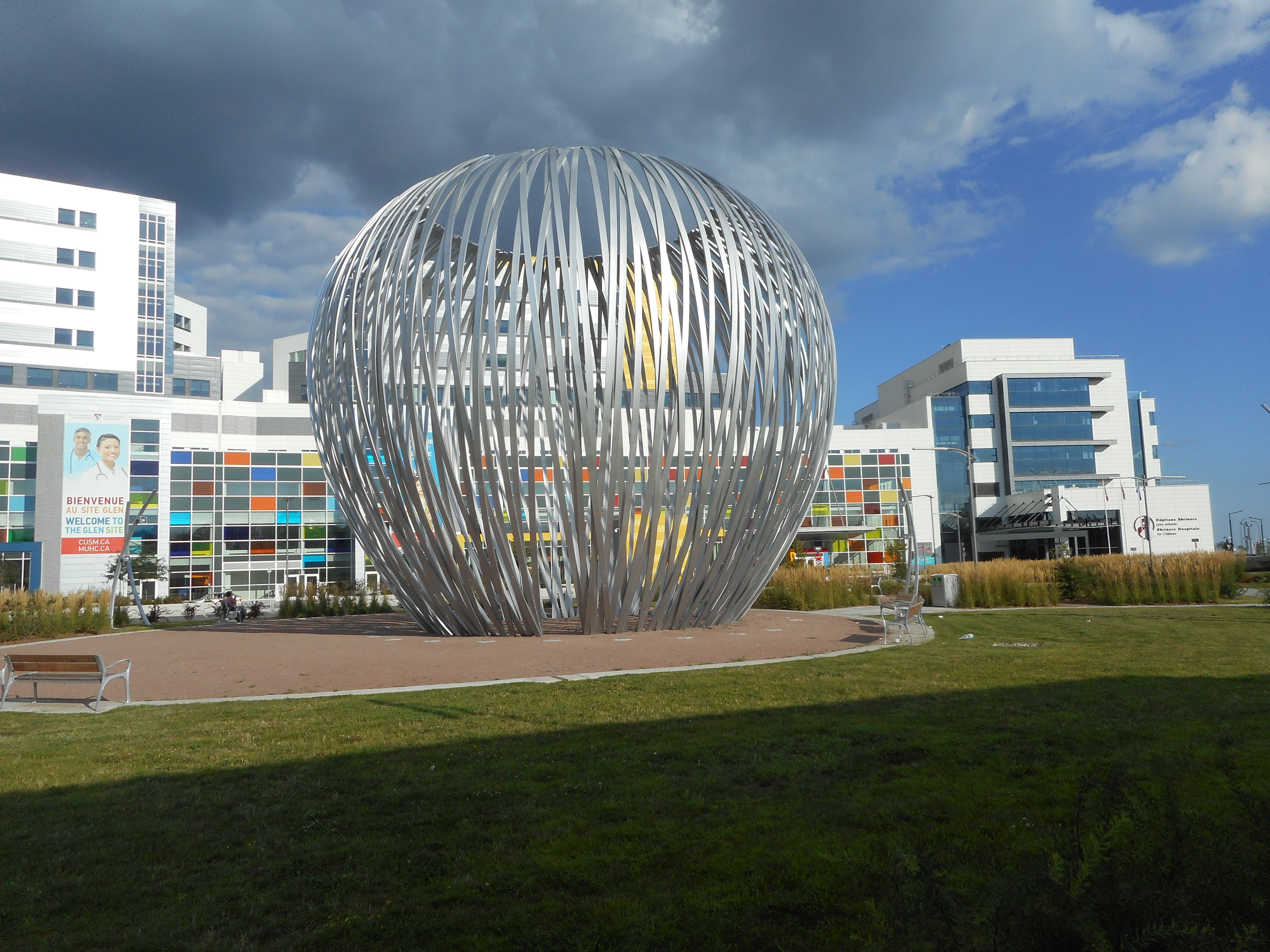
Havre by Linda Covit

In 1994 Covit completed Nature Stations, a public artwork installed at the Cite de la Santé de Laval in Laval, Quebec. The 2002 work Circle of Words, Garden of Thought is installed at the Driftwood Community Centre in Toronto, Ontario. Covit's 2009 sculpture Water Garden is installed at the City of Calgary's Water Centre. Her 2015 large-scale work Havre, at 13m by 16m, is permanently installed on the McGill University Health Centre's Glen site in Montreal.

== Collections ==
Her work is included in the collections of the Musée national des beaux-arts du Québec, the City of Montreal and the Musée d'art contemporain de Montréal
