= Arts Lab =

Former alternative arts centre in London, England

The Arts Lab was an alternative arts centre, founded in 1967 by Jim Haynes at 182 Drury Lane, London. Although only active for two years, it was influential in inspiring many similar centres in the UK, continental Europe and Australia, including the expanded Institute of Contemporary Arts (ICA) in London, the Milky Way/Melkweg in Amsterdam (where Jack Henry Moore was one of the founders), the Entrepôt in Paris and the Yellow House Artist Collective founded by Martin Sharp in Sydney.

== Drury Lane Arts Lab ==
The Lab contained a 'soft floor' cinema in the basement designed and run by David Curtis. In the entrance there was a gallery space co-curated by Biddy Peppin (Curtis's partner) and Pamela Zoline. In a separate (but connected) warehouse was the theatre, designed by Jack Henry Moore, who initially co-directed the activities there. Both the cinema and theatre were constructed by David Jeffrey, whose partner, Philippa James, was closely involved in the Lab's day-to-day running. Upstairs, the space in front initially housed a film workshop put together by Malcolm Le Grice and students from St. Martin's School of Art and the London School of Film Technique, and subsequently a restaurant run by Susan Miles. Haynes lived in the back above the storage and dressing rooms. A number of other people lived in various corners of the building, and the all-night cinema was often seen as a cheap crash-pad. Such amenities made it perfect for live events and "happenings", and helped establish it as a centre of the London counterculture.

== Arts Lab movement ==
One of the most significant features of the Arts Lab was that it encouraged similar establishments to create other independent centres, many of which outlived Haynes' original, which closed in the autumn of 1969. On 18 December 1968 the Alchemical Wedding benefit for the Arts Lab and BIT alternative information centre took place at the Royal Albert Hall, and following it, on 25–26 January 1969, the Arts Lab Conference in Cambridge emphasized the strength of the Arts Lab movement, listing 50 such centres across the whole country, including the Birmingham Arts Lab, Brighton Combination and centres in Exeter, Farnham, Guildford, Huddersfield, Loughborough, Manchester, Southampton, Bath and Swindon.

== Notable people ==
Yoko Ono and John Lennon's first joint artwork Build Around was exhibited at the Drury Lane Arts Lab in May 1968.

David Bowie, who used to rehearse (and perform mime) at the Drury Lane Arts Lab, co-founded a Beckenham Arts Lab, which organised a one-day free festival, but was disillusioned by the lack of interest of other performers/artists taking an active role in the continuation of the centre.

Dave Cousins of The Strawbs organized the Hounslow Arts Lab.

Wheeler Winston Dixon worked at the Arts Lab in the summer of 1968, writing for the Lab's newsletter, as well as making and screening his own films.

The Havering Arts Lab, run by future Stuckism founder Charles Thomson (at the time aged 16) resulted in the headline "Sex Orgy Tale—Group Banned" in the local newspaper.

The Bath Arts Workshop which was founded in 1969 by ex Drury Lane workers continues to this day (2014) as parent body for the Natural Theatre Company.

The Worthing Workshop, an Arts Lab formed in 1968, included Leo Sayer, Brian James of The Damned, Billy Idol and Steamhammer, whose guitarist, Martin Quittenton, went on to co-write Rod Stewart's UK number one hits "You Wear It Well" and "Maggie May".

Alan Moore, writer of comic books including Watchmen and V for Vendetta, regarded as "one of the most important British writers of the last fifty years". was involved with many activities, including poetry, in the Northampton Arts Lab.

== Influence ==
An Arts Lab Newsletter was produced by Nicholas Albery of BIT in 1968 and updated in various editions of Bitman in later years.

The first multi-day free festival in the UK, the Cambridge Free Festival, was organised by the Cambridge Arts Lab in 1969.

An intentional community inspired by the Arts Lab was founded in 2014 on Merseyside.

== Successors ==
In London, a New Arts Lab (also titled 'Institute for Research in Art and Technology') was founded by a breakaway group of original members and others, including the London Film-Makers' Co-op. Housed between 1969 and 1971 in a short-life factory building in Robert Street, London NW1, it contained a cinema run by David Curtis, theatre and gallery spaces, the London Film Makers' Co-op workshop, John Hopkins's TVX, and a printing workshop run by John Collins. The full-width opening doors at ground floor level enabled J. G. Ballard's Crashed Cars exhibition to be held there.

After a 'Day of Counter-Culture' meeting, a new Northampton Arts Lab was formed in 2016.
