= Folha da Manhã =

- Industry: Media
- Founded: 1921
- Headquarters: Brazil

Empresa Folha da Manhã is a company owned by Grupo Folha that runs dailies Folha de S.Paulo and Agora São Paulo and classified sheet Alô Negócios, a paper that circulates in Paraná State, Brazil.

The company was founded in 1921 by a group of newsmen led by Olival Costa and Pedro Cunha, who launched the daily Folha da Noite, a predecessor of Folha de S.Paulo.

The company was formally registered one year later, according to Pedro Cunha, and besides the two main shareholders, it had three other partners: Antonio dos Santos Figueiredo, Mariano Costa and Ricardo de Figueiredo. In 1962, it was acquired by Octavio Frias de Oliveira and Carlos Caldeira.

Currently, the company is run by Luiz Frias, son to Octavio Frias de Oliveira and CEO of the group since 1992.

== Companies ==
Folha da Manhã controls the following companies, either directly or partially, through joint-ventures with other companies:

UOL – The leading Internet portal in Brazil; Folha owns 74% of the company, with managerial control; 25% of shares belong to a group of shareholders led by entrepreneur João Alves de Queiroz Filho, principal at holding company Hypermarcas.

Valor Econômico – The leading Brazilian business daily, a 50/50 joint-venture with the Globo group. Shared management.

Plural - Plural, a joint-venture with US-based Quad/Graphics and managed by Grupo Folha, is the largest offset printing operation in South America.

SPDL – A 50/50 joint-venture with the Estado Group, the company delivers newspapers for both partners. Shared management.

Besides the Folha, Agora and Alô Negócios newspapers, Folha da Manhã has the following business units:

Magazine Division – responsible for guides and magazines that are distributed as free inserts within Folha.

Datafolha – one of the leading polling organizations in Brazil

Folhapress – news agency

Publifolha – a publishing house for books on journalism, tourism, languages, general reference, cooking and children’s tales.

Três Estrelas – a premium imprint for books on Humanities

Livraria da Folha – online bookstore

Transfolha – a delivery company that distributes print products and e-commerce packages

Folha Gráfica – provides printing services for corporations, publishing houses and advertising agencies

== See also ==
- Grupo Folha;
- Folha de S.Paulo;
