= Frías (name) =

Frías is a common Spanish surname. Its Portuguese counterpart is Frias (with no stress mark). Notable people with Frías or Frias as middle name, last name, apellido materno, or apellido paterno include:

- Duke of Frías, a hereditary title created in 1492 by King Ferdinand II of Aragon, and used by several persons throughout Spanish history
- Adán Chávez Frías (born 1953), Venezuelan politician
- Alonso de Salazar Frías (c. 1564–1636), known as "The Witches’ Advocate" during the Spanish Inquisition
- Aníbal José Chávez Frías (1957–2016), Colombian politician
- Arturo Frias (born 1956), American boxer
- Charles Frias (1922–2006), American businessman and philanthropist
- Elena Frías de Chávez (born 1935), mother of Venezuelan president Hugo Chávez
- Fany Santa Chalas Frias (born 1993), Dominican sprinter
- Gabriela Frías (born 1971), Mexican journalist and television host
- Gustavo Martínez Frías (1935–2009), Colombian Catholic archbishop
- Hanley Frías (born 1973), Dominican baseball player
- Hugo Chávez Frías (1954–2013), Venezuelan president
- Joaquín de Frías y Moya (1784–1851), Spanish military figure and politician
- Jonathan Faña Frías (born 1987), Dominican footballer
- Jorge Frias de Paula (1906–?), Brazilian swimmer
- José Salvador Arco Frías (born 1984), Spanish basketball player
- Juan Antonio de Frías y Escalante (1633–1669), Spanish painter
- Juan Carlos Sánchez Frías (born 1956), Argentine-Bolivian footballer
- Julio Daniel Frías (born 1979), Mexican footballer
- Ligia Elena Hernández Frías (born 1985), Venezuelan pageant titleholder
- Luis Frías (baseball) (born 1998), Dominican baseball player
- Luiz Frias (born 1964), Brazilian chairman of the board of directors of Grupo Folha
- Luz Maria Frias (born 1962), American attorney
- Maguilaura Frias (born 1997), Peruvian volleyball player
- Mário Frias (born 1971), Brazilian telenovela actor
- Mariangela Soleil Frias Trinidad (born 1986), known as Panky Trinidad, Filipina singer
- Miguel de Frias (1805–1859), Brazilian general, politician and engineer
- Octávio Frias de Oliveira (1912–2007), Brazilian businessman and CEO of Grupo Folha
- Otávio Frias Filho (1957–2018), Brazilian editorial director of Grupo Folha
- Paula Frías Allende (1963–1992), Chilean humanitarian
- Pepe Frías (born 1948), Dominican baseball player
- Ramón Ortega y Frías (1825–1883), Spanish writer
- Refugio Pérez Frías (1913–1993), known as Isabela Corona, Mexican actress
- Ricardo Rojas Frías (born 1955), Cuban boxer
- Roberto Gutiérrez Frías (born 1962), known as El Dandy, Mexican wrestler
- Tomás Frías Ametller (1804–1884), Bolivian president
- Victor Frias Pablaza (1956–2005), Chilean chess master
- Xavier Romero Frías (born 1954), Catalan Spanish writer and scholar
