= Partido da Imprensa Golpista =

Political term used in Brazil

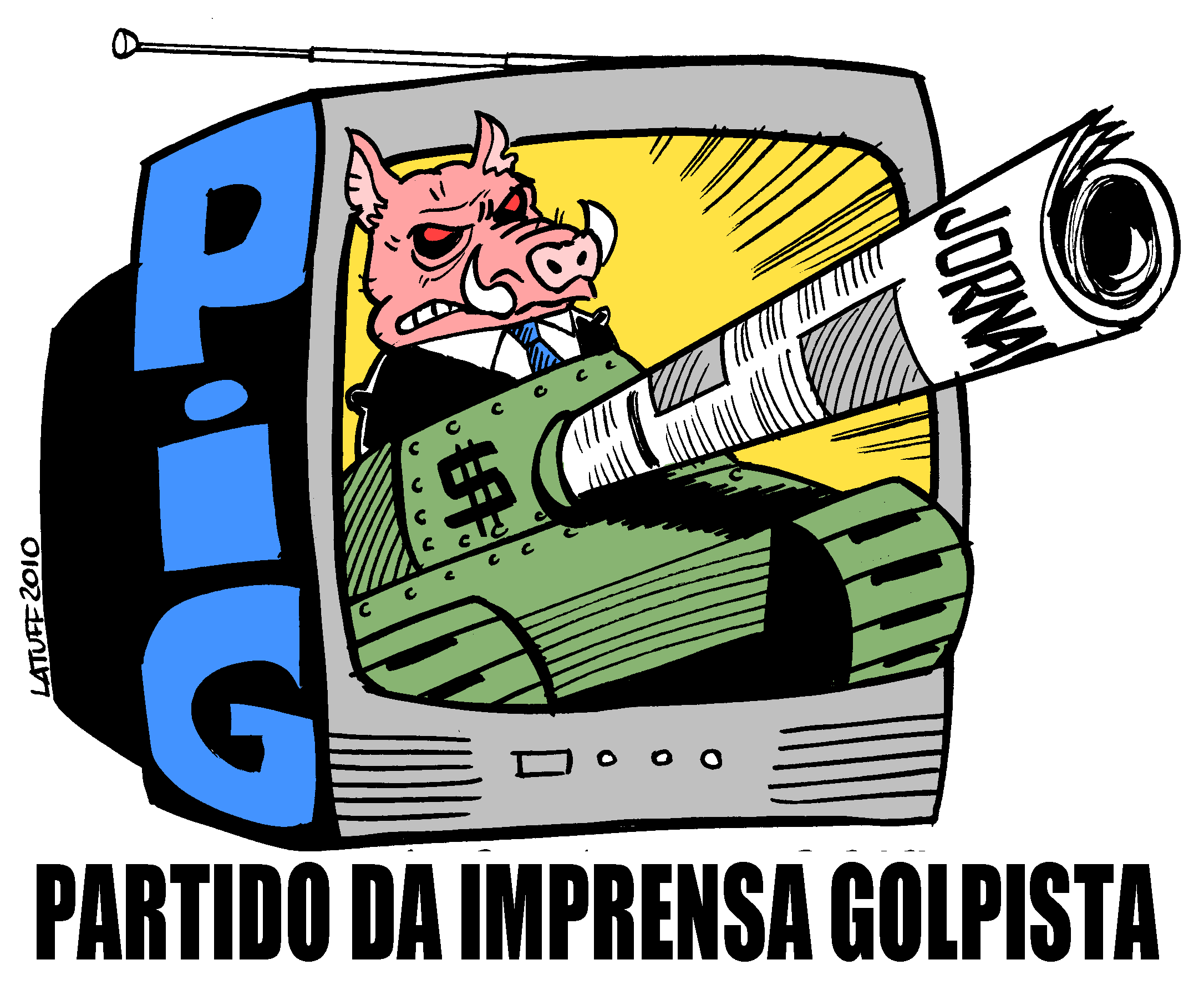
Partido da Imprensa Golpista by Carlos Latuff.

Partido da Imprensa Golpista (PiG, English: Pro-coup Press Party) is a term used by left-wing Brazilian internet users, referring to the alleged hostility of the Brazilian media towards President Luiz Inácio Lula da Silva during the 2006 presidential election. The term was popularized from 2007 by journalist and blogger Paulo Henrique Amorim, who styles the term with a lowercase "i", as a pun on the name of the iG web portal, where he worked before his dismissal on 18 March 2008, which he described as "ideological cleansing".

The term spread in popularity after being used by journalists Luiz Carlos Azenha and Rodrigo Vianna on their blogs, and was first used in the Brazilian Congress by Pernambuco Congressman Fernando Ferro, a member of the Workers' Party, who said that film director and Rede Globo commentator Arnaldo Jabor should run for "President of the PIG".

== Definition ==
Paulo Henrique Amorim explains the expression whenever he uses it in his articles. According to him, "In no serious democracy in the world, conservative, low-quality and even sensationalistic newspapers, and one single television network matter as much as they do in Brazil. They have become a political party – the PiG, Pro-coup Press Party". Amorim said that some politicians have become part of the PiG. He said that "the political parties are no longer an instrument of the coup but they have become the coup itself. Pretending [to do] objective journalism, they not only do the job of a press that omits information; but do the job of a press that lies, distorts and deceits. Former President Fernando Henrique Cardoso was among the first politicians who realized that the political strength he needed could be found in the PIG, and thus nowadays he enjoys the image of being a prominent world leader".

== Historical background ==
Paulo Henrique said that the mainstream Brazilian press historically defends coup d'états whenever the Brazilian President is not elected from among members of the ruling elites. The PIG, according to Amorim, had its origin with Carlos Lacerda, whom he says "helped to kill Getúlio Vargas". It continued its "struggle against democracy" throughout the governments of Juscelino Kubitschek and João Goulart, when finally "it openly defended and promoted the Brazilian military putsch of March 1964". According to him, the mass media also "hammered Rio's governor Brizola throughout his two terms in office, and now conspires against Lula". Political scientist Wanderley Guilherme dos Santos, who predicted the overthrow of President João Goulart in 1964, said in an interview with CartaCapital in 2005 that the "mainstream media led Vargas to commit suicide based on nothing; it almost prevented Juscelino from taking office based on nothing; it led to Jânio resignation, taking advantage of his craziness, based on nothing; it tried to prevent Goulart's inauguration based on nothing".

== Inconsistencies of the term creator ==
In September 1998, on the eve of the dispute between Lula (a Brazilian left candidate, from the PT party) and FHC (seen as the right candidate, but with a center-left trend, from the PSDB party), Amorim led a crusade against Lula on TV Bandeirantes. In an ongoing battle, Amorim attacked Lula in all editions of the main news program of Bandeirantes. Lula sued Paulo Henrique Amorim and TV Bandeirantes, who apologized to PT publicly. When the PT was in opposition, Amorim attacked Lula. However, after the PT went into government, Amorim became his staunch supporter.

About the resignation of the IG portal, the site has a page that informs simply discontinued the contract with the journalist:

Over time, contract costs and market conditions made it impossible to maintain it. Taking the decision, all termination conditions are met and the journalist properly indemnified. Employees of the blog "Conversa Afiada" blog, present at the headquarters of IG at the time it was dispatched the notice of termination, and the site removed from the network, were given the opportunity to take away the materials needed, but they did not. Paulo Henrique Amorim preferred to act under the force of a warrant of search and seizure to remove their belongings and copy the file from his site, what he could have done without judicial review. Discontinue collaboration is part of corporate life and the lives of journalists. Paulo Henrique has gone through companies such as Editora Abril, Jornal do Brasil, TV Globo, TV Bandeirantes, TV Cultura and TV UOL " - all supposedly part of the "party media coup.

In 2012, Amorim was ordered to pay compensation of R$30,000 to journalist Heraldo Pereira (Globo), having stated on his blog that Pereira was a "black with white soul," which was considered a manifestation of racism, at a session held in Justice Court of the Federal District.

== Role of the internet ==
According to writer Fernando Soares Campos, "without the internet, Lula would have hardly been elected; if he had, he would not take office; if he had taken office, he would have been ousted with ease". He argues that "the PIG is strong, is Goliath, but the internet is filled with Davids". Campos says that the mere existence of the internet interferes with the monopoly of information by large media groups, and this interference hampers coups.

== Supposed members ==
According to Paulo Henrique Amorim, only three Brazilian families control the mainstream Brazilian media: the Marinhos (Roberto Marinho, Organizações Globo), the Mesquitas (Julio de Mesquita, Grupo Estado) and the Frias (Octávio Frias, Grupo Folha). According to Amorim, they dominate and condition news in Brazil, through their various newspapers, radio stations, news agencies and internet blogs. They have provoked what Amorim calls "a massacre" of the smaller Brazilian regional press, as a consequence of the control they exert on all of the mainstream information, in order to manipulate the Brazilian public opinion.

Professor Sérgio Mattos, writing in 2005 on media control and censorship in Brazil and elsewhere, also cited the influence of these tycoons, adding, however, two other groups:

The Marinho family has always been close to the political power, taking advantage of the privileged position that helped it to build and dominate the Brazilian communications industry. However, other families also maintain the concentration of media ownership in the country, such as the Civita, owners of the Abril Group, the Sirotsky, of the RBS Group, the Frias, of the Folha Group, among other regional groups in the ownership of multimedia networks.

Mattos's work precedes the creation of the term "PIG" and although talk about the manipulation of information by the media, is much more a warning about the dangers of state control (open or hidden) over the press, warning which was hailed as "very useful" in the book review done by the newspaper Folha de S. Paulo in 2006.

In May 2013, the Chief Justice of the Supreme Court of Brazil, Joaquim Barbosa, in a speech in Costa Rica during World Press Freedom Day, said that there is a lack of political and ideological diversity in the Brazilian press and identified a right-wing bias in that group:

I would point out to the weak political and ideological diversity in the press business. Brazil now has only three major national and broad sheets, all of them more or less leaned to the right in the field of ideas.

== Criticism ==
As one of the main drivers of the acronym "PiG", Paulo Henrique Amorim is accused by the conservative journalist Reinaldo Azevedo of promoting two eternal campaigns: one electoral, and another against the newspaper Folha de S. Paulo and its managing editor. Azevedo said that everything would be done under the auspices of the Brazilian Government, through the advertising budget of a state bank, the Caixa Econômica Federal. According to opponents of the term, the press denounces irregularities in public administration, like several well-known cases of corruption. J.R. Guzzo, "Veja"'s columnist, questioned the term "PiG", saying that when the press publishes complaints it is accused by the government of "destabilizing" Brazil. So, the use of the term would be an attempt to put the population against the press.

According to journalist Pedro Doria, the manifestation of an ideological polarity is intolerant and unable to explain a complex social reality. Sergio Leo believes that the mainstream press is too complex to be labeled this way because it would encompass very different opinions and agendas.

However, the President of the Associação Nacional de Jornais – ANJ ("National Newspaper Association") Maria Judith Brito said the Brazilian press has assumed the role of a political agent in the 2010 presidential election. Brito is an executive of the Folha de S. Paulo newspaper and was once a candidate for councilwoman for the Workers' Party. Brito said that the media has taken on the role of the opposition to the Lula administration:

Press freedom is a greater good that should not be limited. In this general right, the counterpoint is always a question of media responsibility and, of course, the media are doing, in fact, the role of opposition in this country since the opposition is deeply weakened. And this role of opposition and investigation, no doubt, greatly bothers the government.

About Brito's speech, journalist Luciano Martins Costa of Observatório da Imprensa said that:

The biggest risk to the press comes from the press itself, when the newspapers come together to act as a political party.(...) When the press abandons its axis, we all lose. Especially the press.

== See also ==
- Censorship in Brazil
- Impeachment of Dilma Rousseff
- 2002 Venezuelan coup d'état attempt
- Chojoongdong, a similar South Korean phenomenon
- Concentration of media ownership
