= Ivo Patarra =

Brazilian journalist and writer (born 1958)

Ivo Patarra (born February 8, 1958, in São Paulo, São Paulo) is a Brazilian journalist and writer. He has worked for newspapers Folha de S. Paulo, Folha da Tarde, Diário Popular and Jornal da Tarde.

During Luiza Erundina's tenure as mayor of São Paulo, Patarra was her public relations agent.

In March 2010, Patarra published his book O Chefe (The Chief), available on-line for free or via a paid printed version sold by Livraria da Folha and published independently. The book covers the 13-month period of the Mensalão scandal and other episodes of corruption during Luiz Inácio Lula da Silva's government.

== Bibliography ==
- O Chefe (The Chief) – (2010)
