= Datafolha =

Grupo Folha's polling institute

Datafolha is Grupo Folha's polling institute, founded in 1983 as the research department of Empresa Folha da Manhã S. A., and later on became a separate company able to serve external clients, from 1990. In 1995, it became a separate business unit within Grupo Folha, a group of companies to which newspaper Folha de S.Paulo belongs.

Datafolha conducts statistical surveys, election polling, opinion and market surveys, both on behalf of other Grupo Folha units and for the market at large. The company does not offer polling services or government evaluations for public administrations, political parties, candidates or political figures. In February, 2016, the company had completed more than six thousand studies, totaling more than nine million interviews.

Datafolha was created by Luiz Frias (born in 1964), the president of the board of directors of Grupo Folha and Universo Online (UOL) headquartered in São Paulo, Brazil.

== Controversies ==
=== Anti-government protests of 2016 ===
March 13, 2016, during the anti-government protests of 2016, Datafolha counted 500 thousand people demonstrating on Paulista Avenue, in São Paulo, using an on-the-ground sampling methodology adopted since 2011 to estimate the size of mobile crowds in events such as the gay pride parade and the protests that occurred starting in 2013.

The organizers of the protests routinely expressed their displeasure with Datafolha's numbers, considering them an under-estimation. At the invitation of the organizers, a survey by the Israeli company StoreSmarts claimed to have counted 1.48 million people in the protest, by counting the IP addresses of smartphones detected in the region.

=== Impeachment of Dilma Rousseff ===
July 16, 2016, Grupo Folha's newspaper Folha de S. Paulo published the headline "For 50% of Brazilians, Temer must stay; 32% asked for the return of Dilma," based on a study conducted by Datafolha two days previously.

Days later, the journalist Glenn Greenwald accused Folha de S. Paulo of "journalistic fraud". Writing for the online newspaper The Intercept, he suggested that it is "simply inconceivable" that in just three months the portion of Brazilians in favor of calling new elections had fallen from 60% to 3%, and that those that wanted the continuation of Michel Temer's government "skyrocketed" from only 8% to 50%. He argued that in the context of a question in the same poll showing only 14% approval of Temer's government, it's "extremely difficult to understand how [the claim] could possibly be true."

Greenwald went on to say that based on the full data and underlying questions that Datafolha released after the headlines were published, he and others such as the journalist Alex Cuadros believed that the questions posed to those interviewed had been manipulated to prejudice voters against Rousseff in the impeachment suit brought against her.

Luciana Chong, a lawyer for Datafolha, defended the polling institute, alleging "that it was Folha [de S. Paulo], not her polling firm, that determined the questions to be asked."
