= Benevolent dictatorship =

Political system

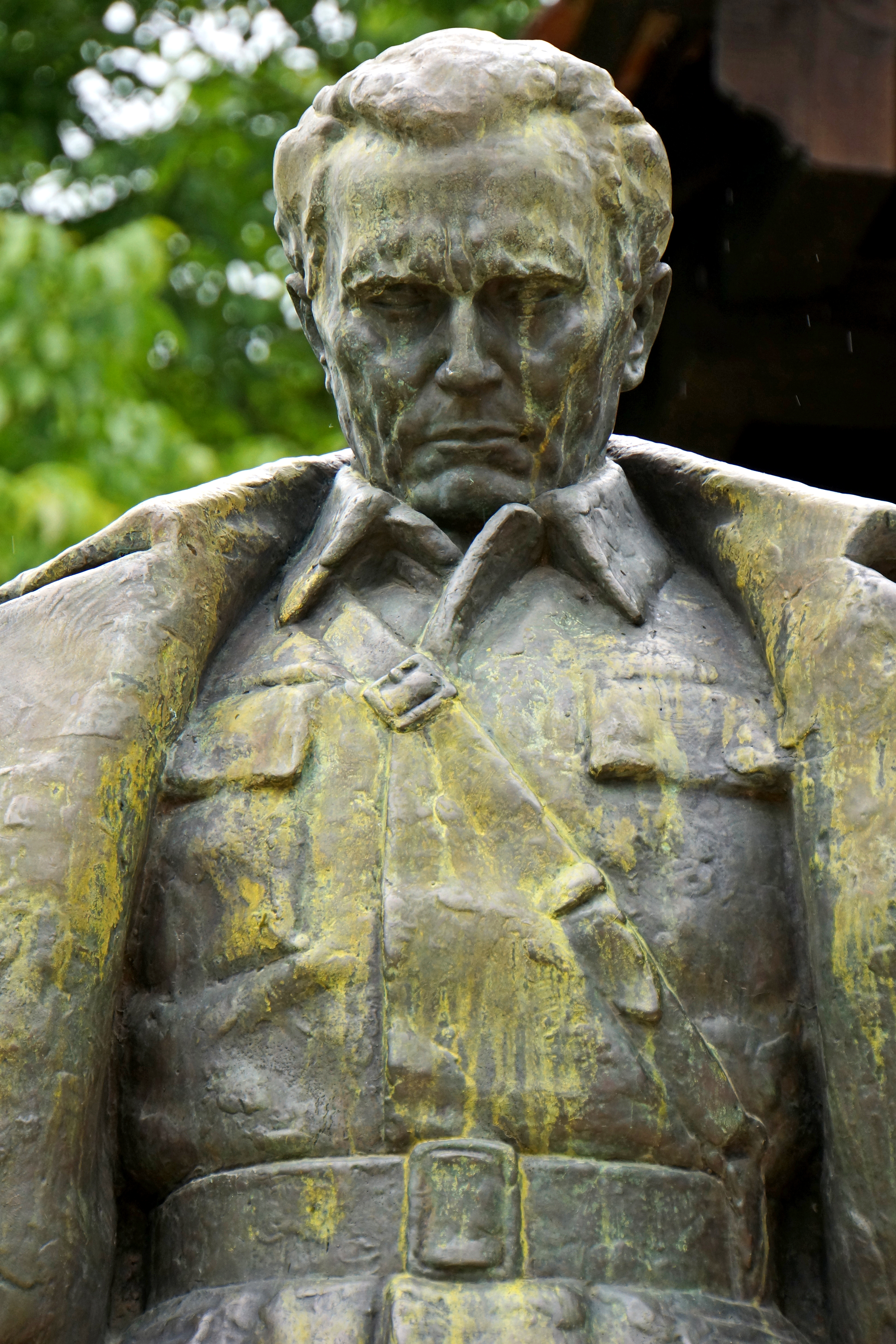
Josip Broz Tito, a Yugoslav revolutionary and politician, has been described as a benevolent dictator.

Benevolent dictatorship is a term that describes a government where a dictatorial leader exercises absolute political power over the state but is perceived to do so with regard for the benefit of the population as a whole.

== Characteristics ==
Economist and political scientist Mancur Olson characterized such dictators as "not like the wolf that preys on the elk, but more like the rancher who makes sure his cattle are protected and are given water", arguing that they have an incentive to provide public goods at the same time they extract the largest possible surplus for themselves.

Economist William Easterly, using the term "benevolent autocrat", identifies two versions of the concept: one that argues that autocrats in general are simply superior to democratic leaders at producing rapid economic growth, and one that argues that the highest-quality autocrats are better at producing growth than the very best democratic leaders. Easterly says that both versions are unsupported by the available evidence, with leaders generally having no measurable effect on growth, and that the reason they have nonetheless persisted is because of their psychological appeal, which has allowed them to claim credit for natural growth that they had no hand in creating. He reports that this rhetoric, using economic development as a justification, was popular in the early 20th century as a support for colonial rulings. The British colonial official Lord Hailey said in the 1940s: "A new conception of our relationship ... may emerge as part of the movement for the betterment of the backward peoples of the world."

== Criticism ==
Many have expressed the view that authoritarian government can never be benevolent, and that regimes that are classified as such are often more repressive. Writer C. S. Lewis wrote:

Of all tyrannies, a tyranny sincerely exercised for the good of its victims may be the most oppressive. It would be better to live under robber barons than under omnipotent moral busybodies.

Political scientist Shadi Hamid stated that if the definition of liberty requires the lack of domination, he concludes that "then a dictator, however 'benevolent', is a contradiction in terms. There is no such thing as a benevolent dictator. Domination is intrinsic to dictatorial rule. And domination, by its very nature, prevents the development of individual agency and moral responsibility."

In a letter to Dwight Macdonald in December 1946, George Orwell wrote, "What I was trying to say was, 'You can't have a revolution unless you make it for yourself; there is no such thing as a 'benevolent dictatorship.'"

== In popular culture ==
In the Spanish language, the pun word dictablanda is sometimes used for a dictatorship conserving some of the liberties and mechanisms of democracy. The pun is that in Spanish dictadura is "dictatorship", dura is "hard", and blanda is "soft". Analogously, the same pun is made in Portuguese as ditabranda or ditamole. In February 2009, the Brazilian newspaper Folha de S.Paulo ran an editorial classifying the military dictatorship in Brazil (1964–1985) as a ditabranda, creating controversy.

== See also ==
- Absolute monarchy
- Authoritarianism
- Dictablanda
- Enlightened absolutism
- Philosopher king
- Soft despotism
