= Falha de S. Paulo =

Former Brazilian satire website, published 2010

Falha de S. Paulo was a Brazilian humorous website devoted to satirizing the Brazilian Folha de S.Paulo newspaper. The website was maintained by two brothers, Lino and Mario Bocchini (journalist and designer, respectively) and was shut down after Folha sued them claiming they used their brand inappropriately by trying to mimic their graphic design, font and logo. Both brothers, however, accused the newspaper of trying to censor them and received support from multiple personalities and organizations.

== The website ==
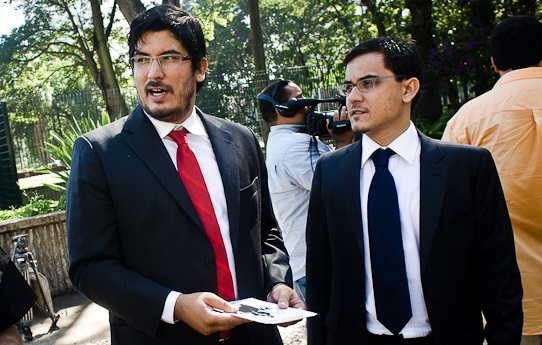
Brothers Lino (left) and Mario (right) Bocchini, creators of the website, appearing on the case at the Court of Law of the State of São Paulo.

The website was first published in September 2010. It featured a logo identical to that of Folha, except that the first "o" was replaced by an "a" so that it read "Falha de S. Paulo", which translates as "Failure of S. Paulo". The website made fun of the newspaper's coverage, especially of what they perceived to be a tendency of the newspaper to favor of José Serra against Dilma Rousseff during the 2010 Brazilian presidential rally in which the two candidates faced each other on the second round. The Bocchinis criticized the fact that Folha, unlike O Estado de S. Paulo and CartaCapital, for example, would not declare its political preferences and even claimed not to have one.

Besides making fun of the newspaper's coverage, they also edited pictures such as one in which Folha's director, Otávio Frias Filho, was dressed like Darth Vader, a villain in the Star Wars franchise.

== Preliminary injunction and lawsuit ==
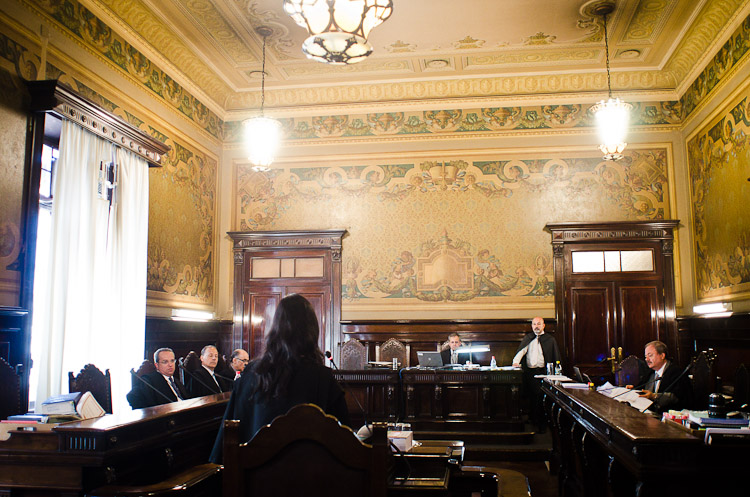
Audience at the Court of Law of the State of São Paulo in February 2013 to discuss the case.

Claiming inappropriate usage of their brand, Folha obtained a preliminary injunction in October 2010 that required the website to be deactivated. They also filed a lawsuit for personal injury. The injunction, given to Mario on the first day of October 2010, imposed a R$1,000 fine for each day the brothers failed to keep the website down. The fine was less than the R$10,000 originally requested by the newspaper. On 4 October, the brothers were informed by Registro.br (the entity that manages all domains ending with .br) that the domain www.falhadespaulo.com.br would remain shut down to comply with the injunction.

In a May 2011 audience, Folha, through its legal representative Taís Gasparian, said it wouldn't mind if the website were back online as long as the brothers refrained from using the newspaper's graphical project, logo, font, etc. The Bocchinis rejected the offer, claiming it would impede the parodies. The Bocchinis counter-offered the option of having a disclaimer near the logo warning readers that they were not browsing the newspaper's website. The newspaper did not reply to the offer immediately, but promised to do so later.

In 2013, the case was taken to the Court of Justice of the State of São Paulo, which decided to maintain the decision of its lower court, reiterating the brand usage rights argument. In 2015, the case was accepted for hearing by the Brazilian Superior Court of Justice, where it awaits minister Marco Buzzi.

== Reactions ==
Multiple personalities and organizations expressed support to the brothers and/or criticized Folha's decision to sue. Among people who commented on the case are WikiLeaks founder, Julian Assange; then host of CQC, Marcelo Tas, and Casseta & Planeta host, Cláudio Manoel; musician and ex-minister of culture Gilberto Gil; and journalists Juremir Machado da Silva, Guilherme Scalzilli, Luís Nassif and Celso Lungaretti.

The non-governmental organization Reporters Without Borders published a note asking Folha to rethink its decision and pointing that while the newspaper could afford good lawyers, the brothers were experiencing difficulties financing their defense. The note also accused the traditional media, "controlled by a handful of influential families" of ignoring the case. The NGO also said that Folha's attempt to "financially asphyxiate a media outlet" represented "a new form of censorship" and that its end could open "a dangerous precedent in terms of right of caricature, part of the freedom of expression and opinion." The Professional Journalists of São Paulo Union took part in a protest that demonstrated against, among other things, the justice's decision demanding the shutdown of Falha.

A group of bloggers started a movement called "censura eu, Folha" (censor me, Folha) in response to the case. The case was the theme of an audience at the Participatory Legislation Commission at the Chamber of Deputies of Brazil on 27 October 2011.

Suzana Singer, then Folha's ombudsman, wrote in her column at Folha itself that she recognizes the newspaper's right to preserve its brand, but that she believes the maneuver caused more damage to the newspaper than to the website:

[...] it's no good to a progressive media outlet - which considers itself "the newspaper of the future"- to scrimp a homemade blog, one that is appellative, no doubt, but harmless. In this battle of David against Goliath, the role of the evil giant was played by Folha, which had its image much more damaged than if it had simply ignored the brothers' little rocks.

By the end of 2010, the Bocchinis published what was described as an e-mail by Singer sent to Folha journalists. In her message, she supposedly commented on the repercussion of the case in many outlets (including international ones) and ended stating that "the newspaper should write about the lawsuit, make a story with both sides of the case and better explain its position. It's no longer possible to pretend nothing is happening."

When confronted by Lino Bocchini, Folha's executive editor Sérgio Dávila denied that the company was acting to censor the website, and he strengthened the argument of brand preservation:

Folha is not censoring Falha de SPaulo [sic] blog. It's a brand problem. At no time did Folha forbid or restrict the blog's content. The satire, in no moment, is under discussion. You know that Folha does not have this censorial attitude. Folha is an independent, non-party outlet.

== Desculpe a Nossa fAlha and websites hosting Falha's content ==
After the website's end, the Boccinis decided to keep a website about the case called Desculpe a Nossa fAlha (Excuse Our fAilure), where they publicized their version of the facts, uploaded documents relating to the lawsuit and posted a clipping of the case's repercussion in Brazil and in the world.

Despite the website's end, some people started blogs and social media pages to host part of the lost content of Falha de S. Paulo.
