= Hilde Weber =

Brazilian artist (1913–1994)

- Born: September 9, 1913; Waldau, Kassel, Germany
- Died: December 13, 1994 (aged 81); São Paulo, Brazil: Cartooning; illustration; painting; ceramics
- Known for: Political cartoons
- Movement: Grupo Santa Helena
- Spouse: Cláudio Abramo
- Children: Cláudio Weber Abramo

Hilde Weber (September 9, 1913 — December 13, 1994) was a Brazilian artist, cartoonist, and illustrator of German origin. She was the first female cartoonist in the Brazilian press, working for such publications as A Cigarra, O Cruzeiro, Manchete, and Tribuna da Imprensa, where she became known for her political cartoons.

== Early life ==
Hilde Weber was born in 1913 in the German town of Waldau. Her parents separated when she was little, and she was raised by friends of the family and by her aunt Claire, who was an artist. Weber studied fine art at the Academy of Visual Arts in Hamburg, perhaps due to the influence of her aunt. In 1930, she began working as an apprentice in a graphic arts studio in Hamburg. She also worked as a teenager as an illustrator for the German newspapers Hamburger Anzeiger and Hamburger Fremdenblatt.

== Career in Brazil ==
In 1933, with Hitler's rise to power in Germany, at only 20 years old Weber set off for Brazil in search of her father, the aviator Edmund Weber, who had moved to the country after World War I. In Rio de Janeiro, she began to work as an artist for the Diários Associados media group, illustrating reports written by Rubem Braga. She also worked as an illustrator for the magazines O Cruzeiro and A Cigarra, for which she was the cover artist from 1933 to 1934. Weber also began drawing political cartoons early on, first for the Constitutional Party in its campaign against Getúlio Vargas.

She became a permanent resident of Brazil in 1940, and in 1950 she gained Brazilian citizenship.

Weber lived in São Paulo from 1943 until 1950, drawing for the newspapers Folha da Manhã and Noite Ilustrada. She participated in the work of the Grupo Santa Helena, a group of artists who would meet at a building known as the Palacete Santa Helena. She worked in painting and ceramics at the Osirarte workshop, alongside such artists as Alfredo Volpi and Mário Zanini. Through work in this and other workshops, Weber contributed azulejo tilework to such buildings as the Church of Saint Francis of Assisi in Pampulha. She also worked in theatrical design, including for a production of Thieves' Carnival by Jean Anouilh.

In 1950 she returned to Rio, having been hired as the cartoonist for the newspaper Tribunal da Impresa, which was run by Carlos Lacerda, a powerful figure in the conservative National Democratic Union party. There, she drew satirical caricatures related to the news of the day, frequently depicting President Getúlio Vargas, which took on an anti-Peronist slant under Lacerda's leadership. She also created the comic strip Tribulino for the newspaper. Weber worked for the Tribunal until the newspaper was sold, in 1962. After that, she moved back to São Paulo, where she lived for the remainder of her life. She was hired to work for the newspaper O Estado de S. Paulo, to which she had contributed since 1956.

In 1960, she won the World Newspaper Forum caricature contest for best Latin American cartoonist. Her work was exhibited at the Salon of the National Union of Plastic Artists, in five editions of the São Paulo Art Biennial, at the Exhibition of Modern Art in Belo Horizonte, and in the Official and National Salons of Modern art in Rio de Janeiro.

Weber retired in 1989. A collection of her work, O Brasil em Charges (1950 – 1985), was published by Circo Editorial.

== Personal life ==
Weber was married three times. With her second husband, the journalist Cláudio Abramo, she had one son, Cláudio Weber Abramo, who was also a journalist.

She died in 1994, in São Paulo, at age 81.
