= Sérgio Dávila =

Brazilian journalist

- Born: 1965; Brazil
- Alma mater: Pontifical Catholic University of São Paulo; Stanford University; University of São Paulo
- Occupation: Journalist
- Employer: Editora Abril (1989–1993); Folha de S.Paulo (1993–)

Sérgio Dávila (born São Paulo, 1965) is a Brazilian journalist, and the current editor-in-chief of Folha de S.Paulo, taking over the post after Maria Cristina Frias stayed on it for 7 months.

== Career ==
Initially, he was a reporter for Revista da Folha. He then edited Ilustrada, a notebook focused on cultural issues, from 1996 to 2000. Later, he became an international correspondent for Folha de S.Paulo. He covered the Iraq War, winning the 2003 Esso Award with the book Diário de Bagdá – A Guerra do Iraque segundo os bombardeados.
