= Paul Singer (economist) =

Austrian-born Brazilian economist

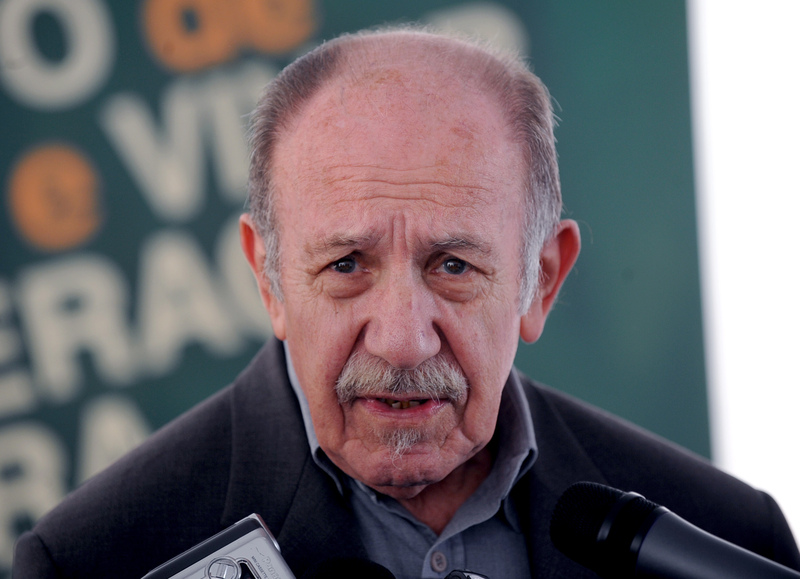
- Paul Singer at Conferência Nacional de Economia Solidária, 2010
- Born: 24 March 1932; Vienna, Austria
- Died: 16 April 2018 (aged 86); São Paulo, São Paulo, Brazil
- Occupations: Economist and professor
- Children: André Vitor Singer

Paul Israel Singer (24 March 1932 – 16 April 2018) was an Austrian-born Brazilian economist and scholar.

== Early life ==
Paul Singer was born into a family of small Jewish merchants based in Erlaa, a working-class suburb of Vienna. In 1938, after the German annexation of Austria, and the beginning of persecution of the Jews, the family decided to emigrate. In 1940, they settled in São Paulo Brazil where they already had some relatives. In 1948 he joined the Dror kibbutz movement (current Habonim Dror). In 1951 Singer graduated in electrotechnology at Getúlio Vargas Technical School in São Paulo, practicing his profession between 1952 and 1956. During this period, Singer joined the Metalworkers' Union of São Paulo. As a metalworker, he led a 300,000 workers' strike, which paralyzed the industry of São Paulo for more than a month in 1953. Singer became a Brazilian citizen in 1954.

== Academic and political career ==
Later, he studied economics at the University of São Paulo, at the same time that he developed political activity in the Brazilian Socialist Party. Singer graduated in 1959, in the same year he participated in the founding of Polop, a political organization made up of members of the left wing of the PSB.

In 1960, Singer began his teaching at USP, as an assistant professor. In 1966, he obtained a PhD in sociology with a study on economic development and its territorial developments, addressing five Brazilian cities - São Paulo, Belo Horizonte, Blumenau, Porto Alegre and Recife - at the Faculty of Philosophy, Letters and Human Sciences. The thesis gave rise to the book Economic Development and Urban Evolution, under the guidance of Professor Florestan Fernandes.

Between 1966 and 1967 he studied demography at Princeton University in the United States. In 1968 he presented his thesis on free teaching, Population Dynamics and Development. That same year, he resumed his activities as a professor at USP until his political rights were revoked by AI-5 and he was compulsorily retired because of his political activities in 1969.

That same year, with several other researchers and teachers expelled from the university or simply discordant of the regime, he participated in the founding of CEBRAP - Brazilian Center for Analysis and Planning, which became a nucleus of the Brazilian intelligentsia opposed to the military dictatorship, then in force in the country. He worked at CEBRAP until 1988, before being appointed Municipal Secretary of Planning of São Paulo.

From 1979 he returned to teaching, as a professor at the Pontifical Catholic University of São Paulo (PUC-SP), where he remained for four years, having been head of the Department of Economics and member of the University Council.

In 1980 he was one of the founders of the Workers' Party, along with other left-leaning intellectuals, such as Francisco Weffort, Plínio de Arruda Sampaio, Perseu Abramo, Mário Pedrosa, Sérgio Buarque de Holanda, Chico de Oliveira and Vinícius Caldeira Brant.

In 1989 he was appointed by the then mayor of São Paulo, Luiza Erundina, to be the city's Secretary of Planning, occupying the post until 1992.

== Death ==
Paul Singer died in São Paulo, on 16 April 2018.

== Solidarity economics ==
Singer's last studies were on solidarity economy and projects focused on local development.

In 2011, working with the federal government as National Secretary for Solidarity Economy of the Ministry of Labor and Employment, Paul Singer presented his ideas on community banks. Singer believed that these banks are instruments for the eradication of extreme poverty.

== Published books ==
- Introdução à Economia Solidária. São Paulo: Editora Fundação Perseu Abramo, 2002.
- Para entender o mundo financeiro. São Paulo: Contexto, 2000.
- O Brasil na crise: perigos e oportunidades. São Paulo: Contexto, 1999. 128 p.
- Globalização e Desemprego: diagnósticos e alternativas. São Paulo: Contexto, 1998.
- Uma Utopia Militante. Repensando o socialismo. Petrópolis: Vozes, 1998. 182 p.
- Social exclusion in Brazil. Geneva: Internacional Institute for Labour Studies, 1997. 32 p.
- São Paulo's Master Plan, 1989-1992: the politics of urban space. Washington, D.C.: Woodrow Wilson International Center for Scholars, 1993.
- O que é Economia. São Paulo: Brasiliense, 1998.
- São Paulo: trabalhar e viver. São Paulo: Brasiliense, 1989. Em co-autoria com BRANT, V. C.
- O Capitalismo - sua evolução, sua lógica e sua dinâmica. São Paulo: Moderna, 1987.
- Repartição de Renda - ricos e pobres sob o regime militar. Rio de Janeiro: Zahar, 1986.
- A formação da classe operária. São Paulo: Atual, 1985.
- Aprender Economia. São Paulo: Brasiliense, 1983.
- Dominação e desigualdade: estrutura de classes e repartição de renda no Brasil. Rio de Janeiro: Paz e Terra, 1981.
- SINGER, P. I. (Org.); BRANT, V. C. (Org.) . São Paulo: o povo em movimento. Petrópolis: Vozes, 1980.
- Guia da inflação para o povo. Petrópolis: Vozes, 1980.
- O que é socialismo hoje. Petrópolis: Vozes, 1980.
- Economia Política do Trabalho. São Paulo: Hucitec, 1977.
- A Crise do Milagre. Rio de Janeiro: Paz e Terra, 1976.
- Curso de Introdução à Economia Política. Rio de Janeiro: Forense, 1975.
- Economia Política da Urbanização. São Paulo: Brasiliense, 1973.
- A cidade e o campo. São Paulo: Editora Brasiliense, 1972. Em co-autoria com CARDOSO, F. H.
- Dinâmica Populacional e Desenvolvimento. São Paulo: Hucitec, 1970.
- Desenvolvimento Econômico e Evolução Urbana. São Paulo: Editora Nacional, 1969.
- Desenvolvimento e Crise. São Paulo: Difusão Européia, 1968.
