= The Korea Press Consumerism Organization =

South Korean non-profit

The Korea Press Consumerism Organization (KPCO, 언론소비자운동단체) is a media NGO group which was established by Korean citizens in 2008.

== Role of KPCO ==
The KPCO has established the following vision: To be a practicing press consumerism movement, monitoring biased and distorted media in order to contribute to the development of a healthy and productive media, which reports fairly and objectively.

== History ==
In April 2008, the Korea-US beef talks brought agreement on recommencing beef imports. Since neither the risk of mad cow disease nor the damage to Korean farmers was reflected upon during the process, the people continued to have a peaceful candlelight demonstration to demand a renegotiation of US beef imports in South Korea.

Chosun Ilbo, Joongang Ilbo and Dong-a Ilbo collectively so called Cho-Joong-Dong have supported the Lee Myung-bak regime's beef imports. This is despite the fact that they were critical of the previous government's beef import policies because of the risk of mad cow disease. Also, they have reported about peaceful candlelight demonstrations, framing them as violent, anti-national and anti-American.

As a result, numerous citizens have joined boycott of the three papers themselves at the Korean internet portal site Daum, to speak out against biased and distorted media.

=== Starting the Korea Press Consumerism Organization(NGO) ===
The NGO group, The Korean Press Consumerism Organization (KPCO) was established on 30 August 2008, upgrading their status to a systematic group and growing beyond the “Cho-Joong-Dong” boycott, to contribute to efforts to develop a healthy and fair media culture and defend press consumers’ rights.

=== Consumer Boycott Methods ===
The members of the KPCO share the information of companies which put ads in those three newspapers and then call companies, asking them stop their ads. This boycott has been run online.

== The impact of boycotts ==
Because of the boycott, Cho-Joong-Dong's advertisements were significantly shrunken. This effect was compounded by the fact that the boycott's most active phase coincided with the economic recession in the second half of 2008. As a result of this double impact, the Cho-Joong-Dong sued the boycott organisers for ‘interference of work’.

=== Boycott trial ===
24 members of Korea Press Consumerism Organization held in Court. On February 19, 2009, those 24 members were found guilty at the first-level court, with penalties of up to 10-months in jail (on a two-year reprieve) or fines.

=== KPCO’s reaction ===
KPCO says this is an unacceptable result, and they will launch an appeal.

== The controversy about the conviction ==
Critical Viewpoint: Public-Law Specialist Park Kyung-shin (Professor of Law, Korea University)

The court has confirmed that “readers, as the consumers of mass media, can aim to change the policies of editors by organising a boycott against mass media” and “it is permitted to list advertisers on the Internet or to suggest a boycott based on the list, as long as the advertisers are free to make informed decisions about where to put their advertisements.” It puts an end to any controversy about the legality of secondary boycotts. However, the conviction states that appealing for a boycott through the Internet is outside the permissible scope of the law.

=== The definition of power ===
The court decided that to be found guilty of the crime of ‘interference of work’, the guilty party has to have exercised a type of power (whether corporeal or incorporeal), which is based on threats and the confusion of one's free will. The court based their decision on the idea that the 24 members’ boycott action constitutes this type of power, and in reality, it is not necessary for a victim's free will to be repressed by that power. But it is inevitable that boycotts which are run by many voluntary customers will put both tangible and intangible pressure on target companies. If the court punishes this pressure as an impermissible type of power, it means that in the future the only boycotts which will be permitted in Korea will be those tolerated by prosecution and court. That is the same as saying that boycotts which have no power of this type due to a lack of volunteers will be allowed, and boycotts which are powerful because they are backed by many volunteers are criminal.

=== Contradiction of judgement ===
The court made a judgement of interference of work because of too many received telephone calls, but this issue might also arise when too many commercial orders are received by telephone. Under any democratic country's legal principles, it cannot be logically justified that the congestion of the ordering telephone calls is legal and the congestion of the protest calls should be illegal. How defendants of this case exercised power by suggesting a boycott to citizens. In addition they ask how the people who leave messages on an Internet bulletin board can interrupt or overbear the free decisions of readers or advertisers.

=== Conspiracy Joint Principal Offense” theory ===
The most serious error of the court in answering the above question is to say that the so-called “Conspiracy Joint Principal Offense” theory applies to the Internet, but this inference is unreasonable in the context. Despite the absence of a thorough investigation, the prosecution is putting the responsibility of unspecified actors’ unreasonable conduct (verbal abuse and threatening phone calls) on the defendants, who consistently advocated their polite boycott notice. There is no proof that the real phone callers read the web pages which are run by the defendants. In the future, if the prosecution's reasoning is correct, if this means that those people from legitimate social movements who make suggestions on the Internet have to take all responsibility for all possible illegal results as part of the “Conspiracy Joint Principal Offense”.

=== Conclusion ===
There are many consumer agendas suggested by many people in cyberspace but they need a lot of agreement from others to become a consumer movement. In that sense, the reason why so many people joined the boycott was not because of someone's oppressive demands but the expression of awareness as citizens in the here and now. If you do not fit a movement, you can cease action or unsubscribe from the Internet group. No one has been forced to boycott. The final action is a matter of each consumer's “free will” and “conscience”.

== Criticism of the boycott ==
However, there are other opinions that the court's decision is a natural result. These opinions hold that if those people want to boycott against Chojoongdong (Chosun Ilbo, Joongang Ilbo, Dong-a Ilbo), they should not have boycotted against Chojoongdong's advertisers but Chosun, Joongang, Dong-a Ilbo themselves directly.

In the market economy, as Chosun, Joongang, Dong-a Ilbo have high market share and circulation, it is natural thing that advertisers want to put ads in those newspapers. Therefore, this boycott movement is unreasonable

== Current activities of KPCO ==
Recently KPCO held a news conference to announce their suspicion that the media is trying to cover up the issue of the Jang Ja-yeon by a reduction in reporting and KPCO urged Chosun Ilbo to report on it according to fact. Consequently, Chosun Ilbo prosecuted a leader of KPCO for libel.

== See also ==
- Chojoongdong
