= Cláudio Abramo =

Brazilian journalist and author

- Born: April 6, 1923; São Paulo, Brazil
- Died: August 14, 1987 (aged 64); São Paulo, Brazil
- Occupations: Journalist, author
- Relatives: Lélia Abramo, Livio Abramo, Perseu Abramo

Cláudio Abramo (April 6, 1923, in São Paulo – August 14, 1987, in São Paulo) was a Brazilian journalist and author. Born to Vincenzo Abramo and Iole Scarmagnan (daughter of Italian anarchist Bortolo Scarmagnan), his siblings are Athos Abramo, the Trotskyst activist Fúlvio Abramo, Beatriz Abramo, the actress Lélia Abramo, Mário Abramo and the engraver Livio Abramo. He was married to Hilde Weber, a cartoonist, who gave him a son, Claudio Weber Abramo(1946–2018), former executive director of the organization Transparência Brasil and a famous opponent of political corruption in Brazil. Later he married Radha Abramo, who gave him two daughters. He was also Perseu Abramo's uncle.

During his career, Abramo worked for O Estado de S. Paulo, achieving the status of secretary (editor-in-chief) of the newspaper. Years later, just when the Brazilian military dictatorship began, he started working at Folha de S.Paulo, reaching the same status he earned in Estado. Abramo was responsible for the decision of making what was a very tame, dictatorship-friendly paper, into a more controversial paper, therefore running editorials and guest-pieces - many of the latter penned by critics of the régime - debating on the burning issues of the day. In the 1970s, he was nominated again, editor-in-chief, but, in September 1977, the publication of an article by Lourenço Diaféria, considered by military hardliners to be demeaning to the memory of the civic patron of the Brazilian Army, the Duke Of Caxias, offered the opportunity to the military to pressure for Abramo's removal as editor, which was achieved as a reconciliation token arranged by Abramo's successor to the position, Boris Casoy, whose ties to the military allowed him to act as go-between for the paper's owners.

In the next year, however, Abramo returned to the paper in order to finish the reforms being planned for the newspaper since the year before, with Octávio Frias de Oliveira and Otavio Frias Filho. In 1979, he left Folha and started working with Mino Carta in the short-lived Jornal da República. In the early 1980s, he returned to Folha and worked as a correspondent in London, switching it for Paris in 1983.

He was awarded twice by foreign governments: by the Italian government, for his illegal works for the Italian resistance during World War II; and by the People's Republic of Poland, for his support for anti-Nazi movements in Poland.

== Bibliography ==
- A Regra do Jogo - O Jornalismo e a Ética do Marceneiro (Companhia das Letras)
