= Mainstream media =

Mass news media that influence many people

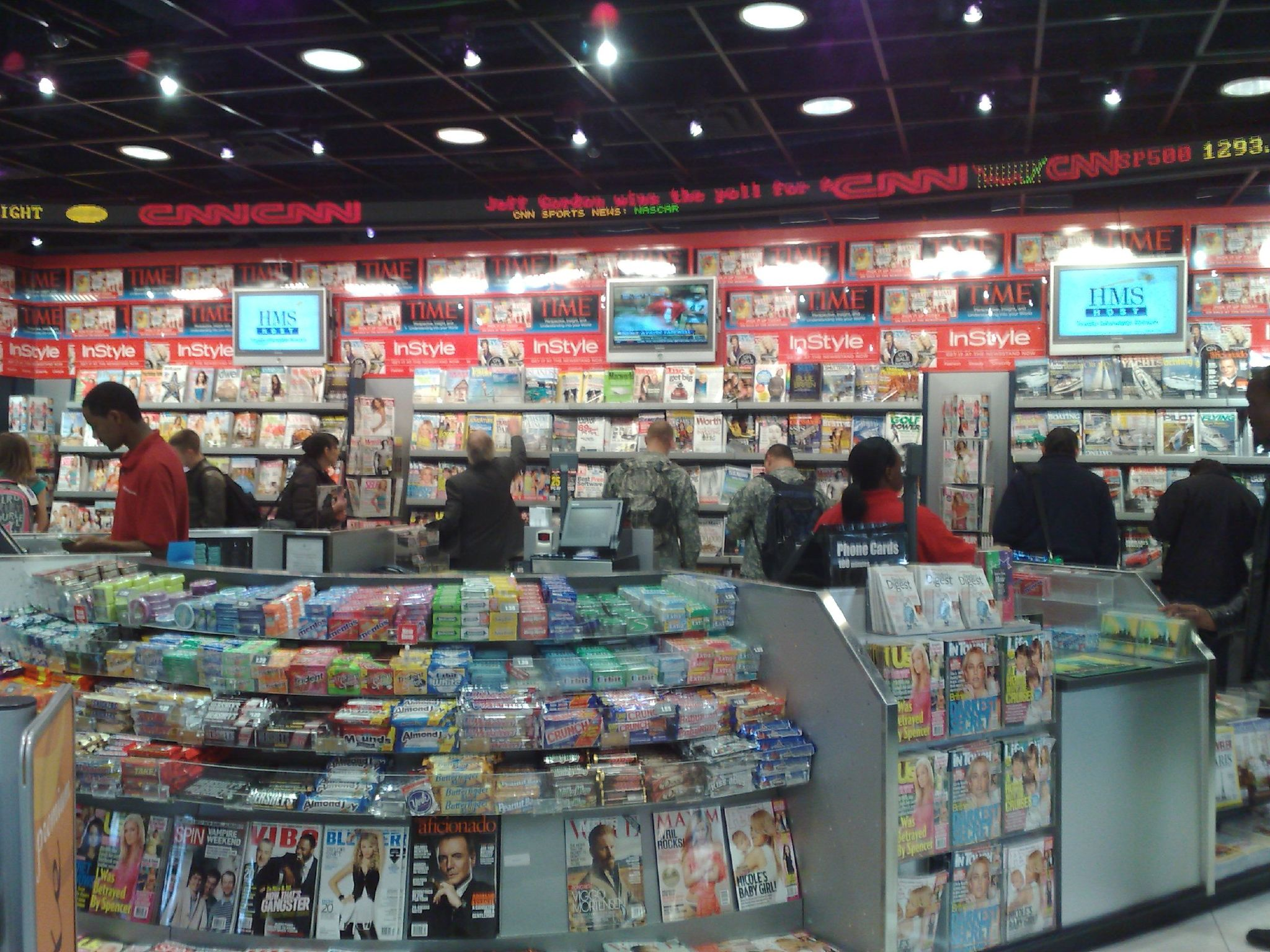
Newsstand in Las Vegas, 2008

Mainstream media (MSM) is a term used to refer collectively to the various large mass news media that influence many people and both reflect and shape prevailing currents of thought. The term is used to contrast with alternative media.

The term is often used for large news conglomerates, including newspapers and broadcast media, that underwent successive mergers in many countries. The concentration of media ownership has raised concerns of a homogenization of viewpoints presented to news consumers. Consequently, the term mainstream media has been used in conversation and the blogosphere, sometimes in oppositional, pejorative or dismissive senses, in discussion of the mass media and media bias.

== North America ==
=== Canada ===
==== Television ====
CTV Canada logo

In canada, the television is a very significant margin of the news consumed, with the leading networks being the state-owned, crown corporation CBC, the private broadcaster CTV and the american CNN. The Canadian cologramates Bell Media, Quebecor and SaltWire Network have a heavy presence in the media, owning outlets such as BNN Bloomberg, and TVA which became possible through the acquisitions of CHUM Limited, Standard Broadcasting, Osprey Media, Alliance Atlantis, and Citytv, respectively. The cable network is regulated by the Canadian Radio-television and Telecommunications Commission.

==== Print ====
The Canadian print media is heavily controlled by two conglomerates; Postmedia Network and Torstar, which actively own greatly more than a majority of the Canadian media by themselves; newspapers include National Post, The Kingston Whig‐Standard, and The Telegram. The newspapers of record Canada has are The Globe and Mail, La Presse, and Le Devoir. The conglomerate Postmedia Network has reportedly had links to the Canadian government and right-wing politics and ties to the american Republican Party.

=== United States ===
==== Television ====
The National Broadcasting Company (NBC) is the oldest major American broadcast network, founded on November 15, 1926.

In television, the vast majority of broadcast and basic cable networks, over a hundred in all, are controlled by eight corporations: Fox Corporation, The Walt Disney Company (which includes the ABC, ESPN, FX and Disney brands), Skydance (which owns National Amusements, Paramount Global, Warner Bros. Discovery), Comcast (which owns NBCUniversal), E. W. Scripps Company, Altice USA (now Optimum Communications), or some combination thereof. Over time the rate of media mergers has increased, while the number of media outlets has also increased. This has resulted in a higher concentration of media ownership, with fewer companies owning more media outlets.

Some critics, such as Ben Bagdikian, assailed concentration of ownership, arguing that large media acquisitions limit the information accessible to the public. Other commentators, such as Ben Compaine and Jack Shafer, find Bagdikian's critique overblown. Shafer noted that American media consumers have a wide variety of news sources, including independent national and local sources. Compaine argues that, based on economic metrics such as the Herfindahl-Hirschman Index, the media industry is not very highly concentrated and did not become more concentrated during the 1990s and 2000s. Compaine also points out that most media mergers are not purely acquisitions, but also include divestitures.

One of the biggest mergers/acquisitions in the mainstream media world was Disney acquiring 21st Century Fox and all of their assets. One of the main things that was accomplished with this merger was completing the rights to the rest of the Marvel movie franchise. Previously Disney did not have the rights to franchises such as X-Men and certain Spider-Man movie rights. With the acquisition they now do. 21st Century Fox was purchased for 71.3 billion dollars in March 2019.

==== The "big five" ====
Conglomerate	Media outlets	2018 revenues
	NBCUniversal: NBC and Telemundo, Universal Pictures, Focus Features, DreamWorks Animation, 26 television stations in the United States and cable networks USA Network, Bravo, CNBC, MSNBC, Syfy, NBCSN, Golf Channel, E!, Olympic Channel, and the NBC Sports Regional Networks. Comcast also owns the Philadelphia Flyers through a separate subsidiary.	$94.5 billion
	Holdings include: ABC Television Network, cable networks ESPN, Disney Channel, National Geographic, Nat Geo Wild, FX, FXX, FX Movie Channel, A&E and Lifetime, approximately 30 radio stations, music, video game, and book publishing companies, production companies Marvel Entertainment, Lucasfilm, Walt Disney Pictures, Pixar Animation Studios, 20th Century Studios, Searchlight Pictures and Blue Sky Studios, the cellular service Disney Mobile, Disney Consumer Products and Interactive Media, and theme parks in several countries. Also has a longstanding partnership with Hearst Corporation, which owns additional TV stations, newspapers, magazines, and stakes in several Disney television ventures.	$59.4 billion
	Holdings include: the Fox Broadcasting Company; cable networks Fox News Channel, Fox Business Network, Fox Sports 1 and Fox Sports 2; print publications including the Wall Street Journal and the New York Post; the magazines Barron's and SmartMoney; book publisher HarperCollins. (*) As of 2020, Two Murdoch companies, with publishing assets and Australian media assets going to News Corp, and broadcasting assets going to Fox Corporation.	$39.4 billion ($9 billion News Corp and $30.4 billion 21st Century Fox)
	Formerly the largest media conglomerate in the world, with holdings including: CNN, the CW (a joint venture with Nexstar Media Group and Paramount Global), HBO, Cinemax, Cartoon Network/Adult Swim, HLN, NBA TV, TBS, TNT, truTV, Turner Classic Movies, Warner Bros. Pictures, Castle Rock, DC Comics, Warner Bros. Interactive Entertainment, and New Line Cinema.	$28.9 billion
	Holdings include: MTV, Nickelodeon/Nick at Nite, VH1, BET, Comedy Central, Paramount Pictures, Miramax, and Paramount Home Entertainment. CBS Television Network and the CW (a joint venture with Nexstar Media Group and Warner Bros. Discovery), cable networks CBS Sports Network, Showtime, Pop; 30 television stations; CBS Radio, Inc., which has 130 stations; CBS Studios; book publisher Simon & Schuster.	Unknown (was previously Viacom and CBS Corporation before merging in 2019)

== Europe ==
=== Germany ===
==== Television ====
RTL, one of the oldest private broadcasters in Germany.

In Germany, the televisionary media is a mix of state television and private television, with an increase in media consolidation due to the growing media conglomerates such as Bertelsmann and the RTL Group. The most-reaching broadcasters are the tax-funded ARD and its Das Erste, the second tax-funded channel ZDF, and the oldest private broadcaster, RTL, with its VOX The most watched news show being the Tagesschau.

The public broadcasters ARD and ZDF are funded by the ARD ZDF Deutschlandradio Beitragsservice, or simply known as GEZ, which is responsible for collecting the television and radio fee, which is similar to the United Kingdom's BBC, or Sweden's SVT, which is also modelled in a similar way.

=== United Kingdom ===
==== Television ====
the UK's oldest private broadcaster

The mainstream media in the UK's television is largely made up of broadcasters that are state-owned and partially private. The state-owned televisions being the BBC, Channel 4, and private popular channels, which are the oldest private channel ITV, commercial Channel 5, and general channel Sky.

The state-owned BBC is funded by the Television Licence fee that is paid by the British public. On the other hand, also state-run Channel 4 is instead commercially funded, not publicly. The television is regulated by Ofcom, and news are predominantly produced by ITN.

==== Print ====
Freedom of the press was established in Great Britain in 1695. Founded by publisher John Walter in 1785, The Times is the first newspaper to have borne that name, lending it to numerous other papers around the world, and is the originator of the widely used Times Roman typeface, created by Victor Lardent and commissioned by Stanley Morison in 1931. The modern-day papers with influence include the UK's newspapers of record, The Times, The Guardian, Financial Times, and The Daily Telegraph. With the highest-circulation paper being the Metro.

=== Turkey ===
==== Television ====
The first private television broadcasting in Turkey

In Turkey, the media is highly concentrated. Turkish mainstream media, which was mainly owned by the Doğan Media Group, was gradually sold to the pro-government Demirören Group and Turkuaz Media Group. While the term "mainstream media" is flexible in Turkey, it includes several channels with high reach, which are, from most to least, NOW, Kanal D, CNN Türk, and Show TV. Along with TRT, the state television broadcaster, and Star, the first private television channel in the country, which continues to broadcast.

==== Print ====
The print media is also owned by several conglomerates, and while there is no single definition of "mainstream media", the highly circulated press includes the pro-government daily Hürriyet, the nationalist and secularist daily Sözcü, the pro-government daily Milliyet, the nationalist-leaning daily Cumhuriyet, and the pro-government daily Sabah. Cumhuriyet is also considered a newspaper of record in Turkey and is the country's oldest modern newspaper.

== Shifting media platform popularity ==
News consumption has shifted with age demographics along with the rise of digital platforms such as social media. Traditional outlets like television and newspapers commonly associated with "mainstream media" face declining audiences as younger users increasingly turn to platforms such as TikTok, Instagram, and Facebook for news. According to Pew Research Center, these platforms are a primary source of information for Millennials and Gen Z, a change that moves away from traditional media towards more online-focused platforms.

Preferred platform use by % of U.S. adults
Ages	Television	Radio	Print publications	Digital devices
18–29	8%	2%	3%	36%
30–49	18%	6%	3%	72%
50–64	42%	8%	3%	46%
65+	86%	72%	46%	27%

This shift in consumer platform taste has led to a crisis in the smaller local news scene, with an estimated average of two newspapers going out of business per week. Larger mainstream media companies with greater budgets will also be forced to navigate the technological shift, with large news companies such as The New York Times and Fox News having dedicated teams work on high quality online websites.

== See also ==
- Agenda-setting theory
- Big Three television networks
- Deregulation
- Fake news
- Freedom of speech
- Freedom of the press
- Hyperreality
- Influence of mass media
- Lists of corporate assets
- Local News Service
- Manufacturing Consent
- Media culture
- Media democracy
- Media imperialism
- Media manipulation
- Media proprietor
- Media transparency
- Monopolies of knowledge
- Network neutrality
- New media
- Old media
- Partido da Imprensa Golpista
- Politico-media complex
- Prometheus Radio Project
- Propaganda model
- Protest paradigm
- Sensationalism
- Social impact theory
- Social influence
- State controlled media
- Telecommunications Act of 1996
- Viral phenomenon
- Western media
