= Agora São Paulo =

Brazilian newspaper

- Type: Daily newspaper
- Format: Tabloid
- Owner: Grupo Folha
- Founded: 1999
- Language: Portuguese
- Headquarters: São Paulo, Brazil
- Sister newspapers: Folha de S.Paulo

Agora São Paulo (lit. 'São Paulo Now') was a Brazilian newspaper published by Grupo Folha which also owns the broadsheet Folha de S.Paulo. It was launched in 1999 to replace Folha da Tarde. Agora led among the popular newspapers in São Paulo, and is the best selling newspaper in newsstands in the State of São Paulo.

Folha da Tarde began publishing on November 22, 1924, but it lasted then for just a month; it was a way to circumvent a ban instituted by the authorities against Folha da Noite. In 1949, the newspaper was relaunched as an afternoon title, to complement Folha da Manhã and Folha da Noite. On January 1, 1960, the three papers were merged to create Folha de S.Paulo.

On October 19, 1967, Empresa Folha da Manhã launched a new paper entitled Folha da Tarde, and the publication was kept running up to March 21, 1999. On March 22 of that year, the newspaper took on a new graphic format, and name, becoming Agora São Paulo.

On November 24, 2021, Grupo Folha announced the end of the newspaper, with the last edition published on November 28 of the same year, after 8,288 issues and 22 years of uninterrupted publication.
