= Sergio Leo =

Brazilian writer, journalist and blogger

- Born: January 25, 1963 (age 63); Rio de Janeiro
- Occupation: Journalist
- Website: Sitio do Sergio Leo

Sergio Leo de Almeida Pereira (born January 25, 1963), known as Sergio Leo, is a Brazilian writer, journalist and blogger.

== Career ==
Sergio Leo graduated in journalism from the School of Communication at UFRJ, in 1983 . That same year, he started working as an intern at the newspaper "O Globo". Prior to that, he was a freelancer for the magazines "Manchete" and "Ciência Hoje".

In 1985, he moved to Brasília where he worked until 1989 as a reporter at the Brasília branch office of the "Jornal do Brasil", and thereafter between 1995 and 1996. He also worked for other major Brazilian media outlets such as Folha de S.Paulo, O Estado de S. Paulo, ISTOÉ, O Globo and TV Globo. In 2000, he participated in the founding of the newspaper Valor Econômico, of which he would become a columnist three years later. In 2003, he got a lato sensu postgraduate degree in International relations at the University of Brasília (UnB). Between 2002 and 2004, he was professor of Economic Journalism course at UnB.

He was one of the founders and first directors os Associação Brasileira de Jornalismo Investigativo ABRAJI.

In 2008 he won the Prêmio Sesc de Literatura with the short stories book Mentiras do Rio. In 2014, he published the non-fiction book Ascensão e Queda do Império X, about the Brazilian billionaire Eike Batista.

== Literature ==
In 2008, he won the SESC Award for Literature with his book of short stories Mentiras do Rio and has participated in many short stories anthologies, such as Desassossego (ed. Mombak, org. Luiz Ruffato) and Conversa de Botequim (Marcelo Moutinho and Henrique Rodrigues, orgs. Mórula ed.). In 2014, published Segundas Pessoas, edited by e-galáxia.
