= Luis Frías =

Luis Frías may refer to:

- Luis Frías (baseball) (born 1998), Dominican Republic baseball pitcher
- Luiz Frias (born 1964), Brazilian business chairman
