= Revista da Folha =

Brazilian weekly magazine

- Editor: Cleusa Turra
- Categories: Sunday magazine
- Frequency: Weekly
- Founder: Caio Túlio Costa
- Founded: 1992
- Company: Grupo Folha
- Country: Brazil
- Based in: São Paulo
- Language: Portuguese
- Website: http://www.folha.com.br/revista

Revista da Folha (Folha's Magazine, in English) is a weekly magazine distributed by Folha de S.Paulo on Sundays. The magazine was founded by Caio Túlio Costa in 1992. It is a diverse magazine, reporting on film, theatre, fashion, TV programs, etc. The headquarters of the magazine is in São Paulo.
