= Luiz Carlos Azenha =

Brazilian blogger and journalist

- Born: April 10, 1958 (age 68); Bauru
- Education: Escola de Comunicações e Artes, Universidade de São Paulo
- Occupation: journalist
- Website: Vi o Mundo

Luiz Carlos Azenha (Bauru, 1958) is a Brazilian blogger and journalist.

== Biography ==
Azenha was born in Bauru, São Paulo. He graduated in Journalism at the Escola de Comunicações e Artes — ECA of the Universidade de São Paulo. As a journalist, he began his career in a local newspaper, the "Jornal da Cidade". Soon he was working at TV Bauru, a Rede Globo affiliate. In 1985, Azenha was correspondent for Rede Manchete in the United States.

In 1988, Azenha interviewed Mikhail Gorbachev in the Kremlin. In 1989, he made the coverage of the fall of the Berlin Wall for Rede Manchete.

Azenha was correspondent in the US for SBT, and, between 2001 and 2004, for Rede Globo in New York City.

From 2008 on, he works as a journalist for Rede Record and has a website, www.viomundo.com.br. On his website, Azenha publishes commentary on Brazilian politics and media, as well as reports based on his experience as an international correspondent.

== Books ==
- Vi o mundo (2009). ISBN 978-85-62962-11-0

== See also ==
- Partido da Imprensa Golpista
- Paulo Henrique Amorim
