= Três Estrelas =

The Três Estrelas book imprint, owned by Grupo Folha, was created in 2012 and covers the non-fiction field, with books on journalism, communication, history, politics, sociology, economics, philosophy, psychoanalysis, scientific information, and biography.

The first titles launched were “A Perfeição Não Existe", by Tostão; "História da Imprensa Paulista", by Oscar Pilagallo; and "Diário da Corte", by Paulo Francis.

The imprint's name was inspired by the three stars accompanying the logo of Folha de S.Paulo, the flagship newspaper published by the company that owns the imprint.
