= Dictablanda =

Dictatorship in which civil liberties are allegedly preserved

- Field: Political science; comparative politics
- Origin: Spain, 1930
- Purpose: Term describing a "soft" dictatorship retaining some civil liberties

Dictablanda is a dictatorship in which civil liberties are allegedly preserved rather than destroyed, and authoritarian and democratic features are combined. Dictablanda is a pun on dictadura ("dictatorship") replacing dura, which by itself is a Spanish word meaning "hard", with blanda, meaning "soft".

The term was first used in 1930 during the second-last year of the Restoration (1874–1931) in Spain when Dámaso Berenguer replaced Miguel Primo de Rivera y Orbaneja as the head of the ruling dictatorial government, and attempted to reduce tensions in the country by repealing some of the harsher measures that Primo de Rivera had introduced. It was also used to refer to the later years of Francisco Franco's Spanish State, and to the hegemonic 70-year rule of the Institutional Revolutionary Party (PRI) in Mexico.

The same play on words can be seen in the example of the Portuguese ditabranda or ditamole. In February 2009, the Brazilian newspaper Folha de S.Paulo ran a controversial editorial classifying the military dictatorship in Brazil (1964–1985) as a ditabranda. In Spanish, dictablanda is contrasted with democradura (a portmanteau of democracia and dictadura), meaning an illiberal democracy – a system in which the government and its leaders are elected, but which is relatively deficient in civil liberties.

== See also ==
- Benevolent dictatorship – related political system
- Caudillo – type of personalist leader wielding political power
- Reign of Alfonso XIII – 1885–1931 period in Spanish history
