= Publifolha =

Created in 1995, Publifolha, Grupo Folha's book-publishing division, has released more than 1,000 titles and currently has 600 books in print.

Its first book was “Primeira Página”, a collection of front pages from newspapers Folha da Manhã, Folha da Noite and Folha de S. Paulo since 1921.

Publifolha concentrates on the news, tourism, languages, general reference, children's tales and cooking areas. In 2012, the company released a new imprint named Três Estrelas specifically for publishing non-fiction books.
