= Paulo Henrique Amorim =

Brazilian blogger and journalist (1942–2019)

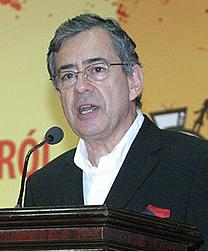
- Paulo Henrique Amorim at the 1st National Conference on Social Communication, 2009.
- Born: Paulo Henrique dos Santos Amorim; 22 February 1942; Rio de Janeiro, RJ, Brazil
- Died: 10 July 2019 (aged 77); Rio de Janeiro, Brazil
- Occupations: Journalist and blogger

Paulo Henrique dos Santos Amorim (22 February 1942 – 10 July 2019) was a Brazilian blogger and journalist.

== Biography ==
Amorim worked as a sociologist and political scientist for many of the larger networks of the Brazilian mass media, such as Manchete Network, Grupo Abril, Jornal do Brasil, Globo Network, Bandeirantes Network and TV Cultura. From 2003 on, he worked for Record Network. Online-wise, he worked for Zaz, Terra, UOL and Internet Group (iG). He also owned an independent web portal named Conversa Afiada.

He died on 10 July 2019 at the age of 77, due to a heart attack.

== Legal disputes ==
On May 31, 2011, the 18th Civil Chamber of the Court of Rio de Janeiro upheld the sentence of first instance that Amorim condemned to pay R$30,000 in damages to Ali Kamel. In the first degree sentence, Judge ledir Dias de Araújo stressed that journalistic criticism are sustainable and encourage people to form their opinions, but can not randomly or falsely impute crime to someone. "It remained proven abuse committed by the defendant to expose your opinion about the author's person, to relate it to the authorship of this book and also extremely offensive way, which entails the duty to indemnify.". To the judge, there is no doubt that there was offense "in two aspects, ie, it reaches its subjective honor, the intimate pain suffered by such placements and still achieves the objective honor, the aftermath of the fact the social environment they live and in the family ".

On 14 September 2011, Amorim was convicted by the court of Rio de Janeiro to indemnify R$100,000 for pain and suffering and accusation without proof to the lawyer Nelio Machado. The blogger published in 2008, that the reason that lawyer has freed twice Daniel Dantas of prison is that he was "very smart carioca", met with advisors of the Minister Gilmar Mendes (STF) to bribe them, where after meeting Dantas who was released from custody. The meeting never took place.

On January 23, 2012, was issued a judgment signed by Judge Daniel Luiz Maia Santos, of the 4th Civil Court of São Paulo, sentenced on January 9, Amorim pay $30,000 to Paulo Souza, for calling him on the blog " Paul African descent "and to disclose the address where she lives. [14] In the lawsuit, the judge rejected on the involvement of Paul Black with receiving stolen jewelry (to have been published in the ABC newspaper Diario days earlier), for calling his name to Operation Sand Castle on the case of Ring Road. However, the judge sentenced a journalist to disclose address (violation of privacy) and considered the nickname invented by the journalist as "discriminatory attitude" (racist) and ordered the payment of compensation.

On February 24, 2012, was finally sentenced to indemnify Heraldo Pereira. Under the agreement, signed and recognized by the parties involved, Paulo Henrique Amorim has pledged to donate US$30,000 to a charity nominated by Heraldo Pereira as well as serve three notes of retractions in the papers state of São Paulo, Correio Brasiliense and blog Talk Sharp, including removing all offenses on the blog.

On May 27, 2013, Amorim was convicted by the 18th Civil Court of Brasília to indemnify the minister of the Supreme Court, Gilmar Mendes, for offensive publications in your blog. In all, the blogger was sentenced to pay $100,000, which were donated to the Association of Parents and Friends of Exceptional (APAE) of Diamantino (MT), hometown of the minister.

In another Heraldo Pereira's process, on June 20, 2013, Paulo Henrique Amorim was convicted of libel against Heraldo sorry for 1 year and 8 months was replaced by rights restrictions.

On August 28, 2015, Paulo Henrique Amorim was sentenced again to indemnify the news director of TV Globo, Ali Kamel. Judge Lindalva Soares Silva, of the 44th Civil Court of Rio de Janeiro, set at $20,000 the amount to be paid by blogger for damages made in an interview with Unity, the Syndicate of Journalists of. According to the judge, "in a civilized society, a journalist needs to manage accurately and balance what you say, because this is the raw material of his work." Freedom of expression continues to judge, "can not break away from the standards of civilized coexistence, mutual respect, can they generate embarrassment of situations through disproportionate words, although tied to criticism."

== Books ==
- Plim-Plim - A Peleja de Brizola contra a Fraude Eleitoral (2005). ISBN 85-7616-095-1
- O quarto poder: Uma outra história (2015). ISBN 978-8577154098

== See also ==
- Partido da Imprensa Golpista
- Luiz Carlos Azenha
- Observatório da Imprensa
- Daniel Dantas (entrepreneur)
