= Otávio Frias Filho =

Brazilian newspaper editor

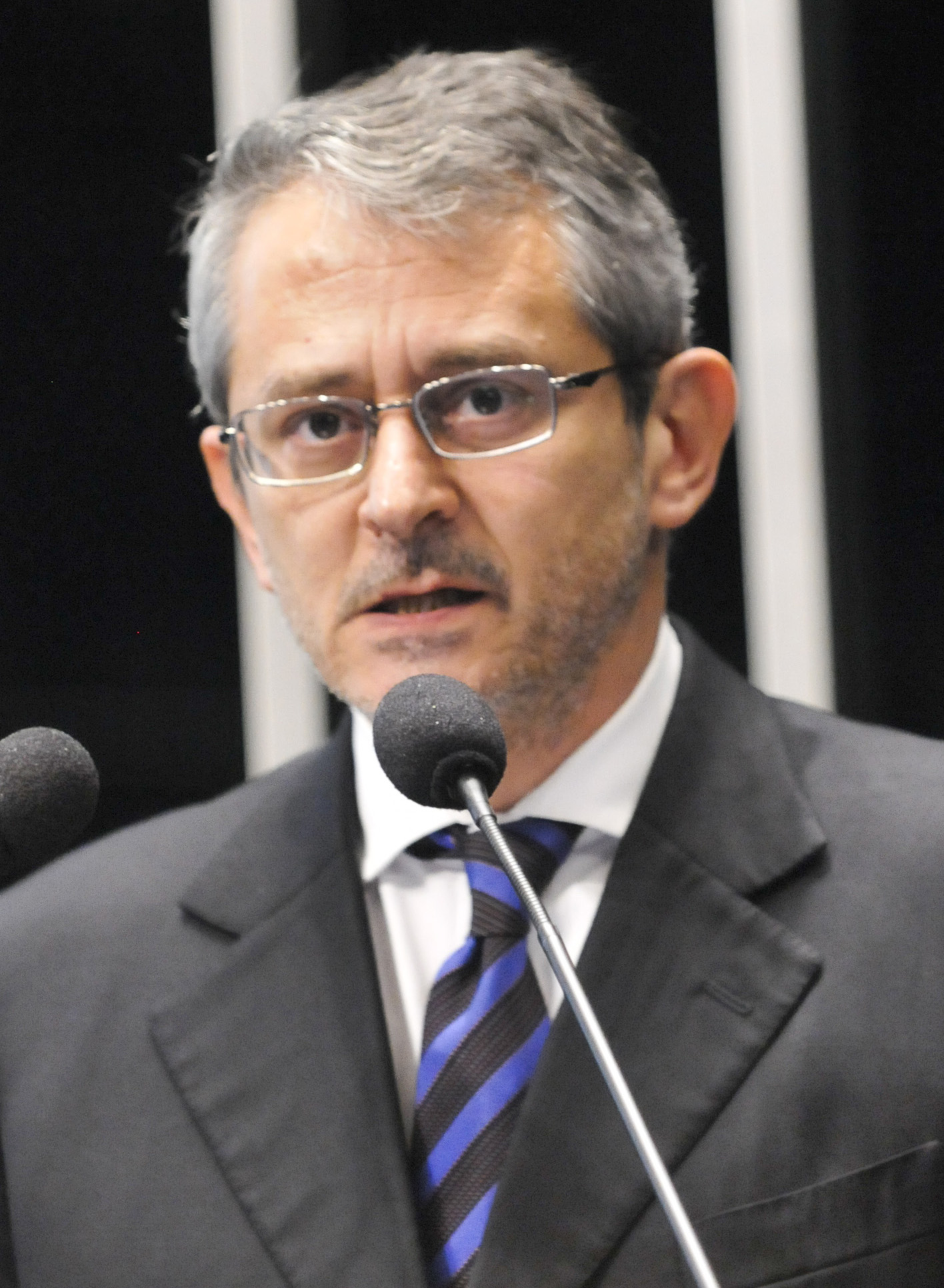
- Born: Octavio Frias de Oliveira Filho; 7 June 1957; São Paulo, Brazil
- Died: 21 August 2018 (aged 61); São Paulo, Brazil
- Occupation: Newspaper editor
- Years active: 1975–2018
- Employer: Folha de S. Paulo
- Father: Octavio Frias de Oliveira

Octavio Frias de Oliveira Filho, known as Otávio Frias Filho (7 June 1957 – 21 August 2018), was a Brazilian newspaper editor. He was Folha de S.Paulo's editorial director since 1984, as well as Grupo Folha's editorial director.

== Biography ==
Eldest son of Octavio Frias de Oliveira, an entrepreneur who bought the company responsible for Folha in 1962, Frias Filho started to work for the newspaper in 1975, writing editorials and helping out journalist Cláudio Abramo, who headed the newsroom. He took part in the editorial reforms conducted by Octavio Frias and Abramo during that period, which resulted in opening Folha's pages to political and intellectual figures of all stripes, taking advantage of the political opening then being promoted by the military regime. This pluralistic viewpoint earned respect for Folha and brought it closer to the civilian society.

As newsroom director, Frias Filho systematized and developed the newspaper's experiences during the political opening and Diretas Já periods. A series of documents circulated periodically defined the newspaper's editorial project as part of the so-called Projeto Folha, defined by critical, unbiased and pluralistic news coverage. Those same principles oriented Folha's Newsroom Manual, launched in 1984 and updated on several occasions since. More than a style guide, it serves as a guide to the rules and commitments Folha works under. It was the first publication of its kind to be made available to the general public in Brazil.

The guidelines stipulate that all journalism must be descriptive and accurate, but that themes that cause controversy can admit to more than one viewpoint and require a pluralistic treatment. Folha became known also for its highly diverse selection of columnists. At the same time, checks and balances were instituted through internal controls: the Manual, the daily “Corrections” section adopted in 1991, a rule stating that objections to any article expressed by readers or people mentioned in the news should be printed, and, above all, the ombudsman position, created in 1989; this position entails job security for its holder, whose aim is to criticize Folha and deal with complaints by readers and people mentioned in the news.

From the midpoint of the Brazilian military rule, Folha has kept a critical stance towards several succeeding administrations (Ernesto Geisel, João Figueiredo, José Sarney, Fernando Collor, Itamar Franco). Otavio Frias Filho was sued, with three of Folha's reporters, by then President Fernando Collor. The newspaper's coverage about the administrations of Fernando Henrique Cardoso (PSDB) and Luiz Inácio Lula da Silva (PT) led to accusations of anti-governmental bias in both cases, though the two Presidents belong to rival parties. Beginning with the exposure of a massive fraud on the Ferrovia Norte-Sul (1985), and through the Mensalão scandal (2005), Folha kept revealing abuses and misrule. In 1991, Frias Filho accepted, on behalf of Folha, the Maria Moors Cabot Award, granted by Columbia University.

Frias died on 21 August 2018, aged 61, in his hometown of São Paulo from pancreatic cancer.

== Literature ==
Frias Filho wrote six theatre plays, three of which were published under the title “Tutankaton” (Editora Iluminuras, 1991), accompanied by essays on culture. Four of those plays were staged in São Paulo: “Típico Romântico” (1992), “Rancor” (1993), “Don Juan” (1995) and “Sonho de Núpcias” (2002).

He wrote “Queda Livre” (Companhia das Letras, 2003), collecting pieces labeled as “participative investigations” - seven essay-length reports on experiences that entail psychological risk. He also wrote children's books - “O Livro da 1ª Vez” (Cosac Naify, 2004) and short stories that were published as part of children's collections “O Livro dos Medos” (1998) and “Vice-versa ao Contrário” (1993), both by Companhia das Letrinhas.

From 1994 to 2004, he wrote a weekly column for Folha's op-ed page. In 2000, 99 of those columns were published in book form under the title “De Ponta Cabeça” (Editora 34). In 2009, Publifolha launched “Seleção Natural - Ensaios de Cultura e Política”, with 25 of his essays on theater, movies and journalism, written on the previous 25 years.
