= Caio Túlio Costa =

Brazilian journalist

Caio Túlio Costa (born 1954 in Alfenas) is a Brazilian journalist, professor of journalism, PhD in communication at the University of São Paulo and visiting research fellow at Columbia University (2013). Expert in digital media, he is also the founder of Torabit, a digital monitoring platform that started operating commercially in 2017.

Costa worked for 21 years at the newspaper Folha de S.Paulo where he was editor, managing editor, correspondent in Europe (based in Paris), magazine director and pioneer in the company's investments in internet. He was also the first ombudsman of the Brazilian press, a position he held in this same newspaper.

Then, Caio Túlio created Folha de São Paulo's weekly magazine Revista da Folha and, in 1995, was one of the founders of the internet service provider Universo Online (UOL), of which he was the general director until 2002. He was also the Presidente of iG, other Brazilian internet portal.
