= Perseu Abramo =

Brazilian journalist and writer

- Born: July 17, 1929; São Paulo, Brazil
- Died: March 6, 1996
- Occupations: journalist, writer, professor
- Known for: co-creator of the Vladimir Herzog Award

Perseu Abramo (July 17, 1929 in São Paulo – March 6, 1996) was a Brazilian journalist, sociologist, social historian and writer. Apart from working in many Brazilian vehicles, he also had an intense political life and taught in many higher education institutions. He is one of the creators of Vladimir Herzog Award. He was Cláudio Abramo's nephew.

== Biography ==
He graduated from social sciences at Faculty of Philosophy, Letters and Human Sciences of the University of São Paulo at 1959. In 1968, he mastered at human sciences at the Federal University of Bahia, in Salvador, Bahia.

Throughout his career, he worked in various vehicles, including Jornal de São Paulo, Folha Socialista (from the Brazilian Socialist Party), A Hora, O Estado de S. Paulo (where, in 1960, he obtained the Esso Journalism Award for coordinating the team of journalists who covered the inauguration of Brasília), Folha de S. Paulo, Rádio Eldorado (which he helped to build), TV Globo, Jornal dos Trabalhadores (and other publications from the Worker's Party) and many others.

As a professor, he taught at places such as Faculdade Cásper Líbero, Federal University of Bahia, Fundação Escola de Sociologia e Política de São Paulo, Fundação Armando Alvares Penteado and Pontifícia Universidade Católica de São Paulo, where he worked until his death in 1996. He also contributed to the creation of the University of Brasília.

Perseu was a member of the Brazilian Socialist Party and later the Workers' Party.

== Bibliography ==
- Um trabalhador da notícia: textos de Perseu Abramo (1997) (organized by his daughter Bia Abramo)
- Padrões de Manipulação na grande imprensa (with introduction by José Arbex Jr., preface by Hamilton Octavio de Souza and posface by Aloysio Biondi)
