= Charles Frias =

American businessman

- Born: 8 October 1922; San Antonio, Texas^{1}
- Died: 24 October 2006 (aged 84); Las Vegas, Nevada
- Occupations: Entrepreneur, Philanthropist

Charles (Charlie) Frias, (October 8, 1922 – October 24, 2006) was a San Antonio-born businessman and philanthropist who built several successful transportation services companies in Las Vegas. Having learned about taxicabs from working as a driver, in 1962 he bought ABC Union Cab Co., the first of several he would eventually own.

By one estimate, the limousine, sedan, shuttle and bus service companies owned by Frias and his wife made up about 33 percent of the transportation industry in southern Nevada.

== Biography ==
As a young man, he worked alongside his father and grandmother as a delivery boy in the family business. He graduated from Brackenridge High School in San Antonio, Texas in 1940. He then joined the United States Navy and achieved the rank of quartermaster 2nd class petty officer. After being honorably discharged, he returned to San Antonio, Texas and married his wife, Phyllis.

Upon arriving in Las Vegas, Charlie took a job as a taxicab driver with ABC Union Cab Company. He worked diligently for this company that he would come to own by 1962. Charlie quickly acquired three more cab companies and opened the first taxicab service in Mesquite, Nevada, the Virgin Valley Cab Company. He later went on to further expand into the limousine business by adding Airline Limousine and Las Vegas Limousine to his holdings. At the time of his death in 2006, Charlie had enjoyed over 40 years of success in the transportation field as well as other business activities.

== Civic recognition ==
On March 16, 2004, Nevada Gov. Kenny Guinn commended Frias and his wife as "model Nevadans with generous hearts" as the new Charles and Phyllis Frias Elementary School was dedicated in Southern Highlands, an affluent hillside community about 16 miles from the Las Vegas Strip.

A fire station in Las Vegas also bears his name.

Frias and his wife have established several scholarships and funded several programs for students in the education system. Charles and Phyllis Frias have made it possible for many children to attend college through educational scholarships. They established the Phyllis Frias Environmental Studies Scholarship at the University of Nevada, Las Vegas.

After his death, Frias was honored in the Congressional Record by Nevada State Senator Harry Reid.

He is buried with at Southern Nevada Veterans Memorial Cemetery.
