= Valor Econômico =

- Type: Business newspaper
- Owner(s): Editora Globo
- Editor: Vera Brandimarte
- Founded: 2 May 2000; 25 years ago
- Political alignment: Economic liberalism
- Language: Portuguese
- Headquarters: São Paulo, SP
- Country: Brazil
- Circulation: 124,974 (2021)
- Website: Valor Econômico

Valor Econômico is the largest financial newspaper in Brazil, according to the Circulation Verification Institute (IVC).

It is the result of a partnership between two of the country's largest media groups: Grupo Globo (via Editora Globo) and Grupo Folha and had its first edition launched on 2 May 2000.

== See also ==
- Grupo Folha
- Grupo Globo
- Folha de S.Paulo
- O Estado de S.Paulo
- O Globo
- Veja
- Época
