= Chojoongdong =

Term for major South Korean newspapers

- Hangul: 조중동
- Hanja: 朝中東
- RR: Jojungdong
- MR: Chojungdong

Chojoongdong (Korean: 조중동; pronounced [tɕodʑuŋdoŋ]), abbreviated as CJD, is a pejorative term which refers to three highly circulated conservative newspapers in South Korea. The word is an acronym of The Chosun Ilbo, JoongAng Ilbo and The Dong-A Ilbo newspapers, and the grouping is seen as forming the basis of South Korea's conservative media.

The term was used by The Hankyoreh editor Jung Yeonju (정연주) in October 2000. Since 2008, some critics of CJD have claimed that there is a close relationship between CJD and the Lee Myung-bak government. Liberal counterpart of the term is Hankyungoh, standing for Hankyoreh, Kyunghyang Shinmun, and OhmyNews.

As of 2010, the market share of Chosun, Joong-ang and Dong-a Ilbo is 24.3%, 21.8%, and 18.3%, respectively. Nearly 58% of printed newspaper subscribers in South Korea read one of the three daily news. In December 2011, Chosun Ilbo opened their own cable news network.

== Criticisms ==
Opponents of the three major newspapers credit them with a disproportionate degree of influence and power, to the extent that they believe that simply abolishing them would unleash major positive changes (one of the most prominent anti-newspaper organizations is called "Beautiful World Without Chojoongdong"). Although the major newspapers are private organisations, and are competitors with each other, they are nevertheless considered by their opponents to be a monolithic, quasi-governmental organization. Criticism stems from their previous history of collaboration with Japan in the Japanese occupation of 1910–1945. (the JoongAng Ilbo, however did not exist during the Japanese occupation), as well as their collaboration with domestic authoritarian rule before the democratic transition in 1987.

=== Censorship ===
Some critics say CJD newspapers have conservative tendencies of censoring news unfavorable to the conservative Lee Myung-bak government. Jung Woon-hyun accused the three newspapers of censoring WikiLeaks-related articles that is alleged to have exposed negative issues under President Lee Myung-bak's administrative influence. It has also broadcast the court decisions that acquitted MBC's PD Note and its episode on 2008 Beef protests, but agreed that false information was in the episode.

=== Accusation of strategic marriages ===
Opponents believe that CJD have joined with the business world through strategic marriages, making their articles biased towards capital.

=== Pro Korea-U.S. Free Trade agreement ===
There was some criticism that three CJD newspapers simultaneously presented articles about the danger of negative Free Trade Agreement rumors on the South Korea–United States Free Trade Agreement among South Korean social network service users, particularly on Twitter.

== Promotion of English ==
The CJD newspapers were noted to be active agents in the promotion of the English language in South Korea.

== Anti-CJD movements ==
"Anti-CJD sentiment" has existed in the past. However, in 2008, during the mad cow protests over US beef imports that were feared to cause variant Creutzfeldt–Jakob disease, the major newspapers showed a favourable attitude towards market opening and reported negatively on the Candlelight Revolution. This opposition temporarily stimulated a boycott movement. Protesters attacked and vandalised the buildings of the three major newspapers, and CJD newspapers claim that some of their employees were harassed.

=== Boycott movement ===
During the mad cow protests, Internet activists launched a movement to boycott advertisers who put advertisements in those newspapers. They shared a list of advertisers on the Internet, and then pressured advertisers by launching a harassment campaign via telephone or mail.

On February 19, 2009, the court found guilty some activists who organised and ran the boycott, sentencing them to 10 months in jail (on a two-year suspended sentence) or fines. The defendants have indicated that they will launch an appeal.

== In popular culture ==
The South Korean television comedy program, Gag Concert, lampooned the CJD media establishments as turfs by gangsters who comply with the regulations of the Korea Communications Commission in the skit, War On Television (방송과의 전쟁).

== See also ==
- JTBC
- Partido da Imprensa Golpista - a similar Brazilian phenomenon
