= Ramón Ortega y Frías =

Spanish writer

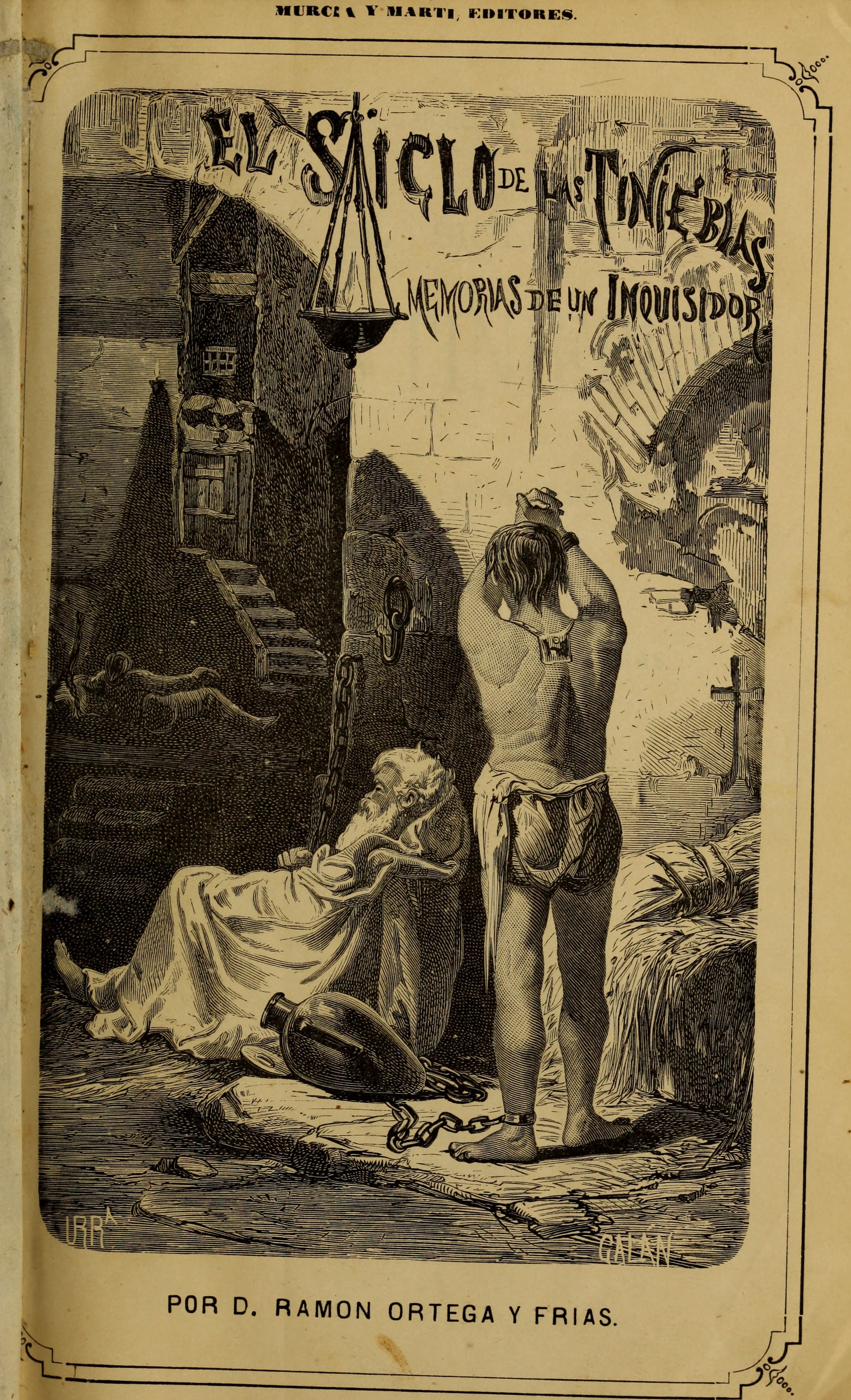

Ramón Ortega y Frías (March 1, 1825 – February 16, 1883) was a Spanish writer.

== Works ==
- El Caballero Relámpago
- Guzmán el Bueno, 1856
- El diablo en palacio, 1882
- Cervantes, 1859–60, 2 vols.
- El Caballero Relámpago, 1853
- Abelardo y Eloísa, 1867
- El alcázar de Madrid, 1857
- La capa del diablo, 1858
- El trovador, 1860
- El tribunal de la sangre, o Los secretos de un rey, 1867
- El siglo de las tinieblas, o Memorias de un inquisidor, 1868
- El ángel de la familia, 1873
- El Cid, 1875
- Los hijos de Satanás, 1876
- El testamento de un conspirador. Memorias de un reo de estado, 1876.
- Las islas maravillosas, o Aventuras del capitán Bristol, 1882
- La casa de tócame Roque o Un crimen misterioso, 1875
- El secretario del Duque, 1867
- El duende de la Corte, novela histórica, 1862
- La politica y sus misterios ó El libro de Satanás, 1869, 4 vols.
