= Livraria da Folha =

Livraria da Folha ("Folha Bookstore") is one of Grupo Folha’s business divisions; the online bookstore currently has on offer more than 180,000 titles, including books, DVDs, Blu-ray movies and videogames.

Its website relies on a team of specialized reviewers that evaluate and suggest titles from within its catalog and keep updated lists with the best movies, TV series and video and PC games on offer.

The bookstore website offers capsule reviews about the main book releases in the Brazilian market.
