= Fábio Konder Comparato =

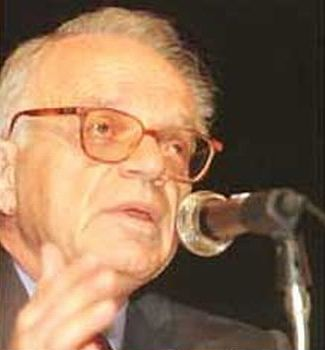
Fábio Comparato

Fábio Konder Comparato (born October 6, 1936) is a Brazilian lawyer, jurist and writer. He is a retired full professor of Commercial Law and Philosophy of Law at University of São Paulo. He holds a doctor's degree from University of Paris and an honorary doctorate from University of Coimbra.
