= Luiz Frias =

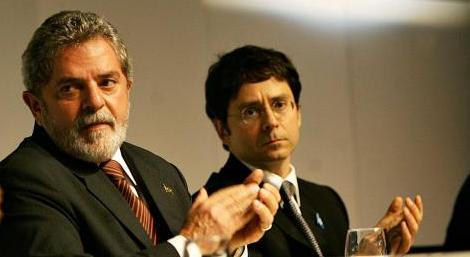
Luiz Frias with then-President of Brazil Luiz Inácio Lula da Silva.

Luiz Frias (born 1964) is the chairman of the board of directors for both Grupo Folha and Universo Online (UOL Inc.) based in São Paulo, Brazil. He is an economics graduate from University of São Paulo, with a master's degree from the University of Cambridge, England, and the University of Paris (also known as the Sorbonne), France. He joined Group Folha in June 1981, and was appointed chief executive officer (CEO) in 1989 and chairman in 1991. He has been president of UOL since it was founded and is also the president of Group Folha. Luiz is the son of Octávio Frias, president of Grupo Folha until his death in 2007, and the younger brother of Otávio Frias Filho, editorial director of both Grupo Folha and its main newspaper, Folha de S.Paulo.
