= Octávio Frias =

Brazilian businessman (1912–2007)

- Born: Octávio Frias de Oliveira; 5 August 1912; Rio de Janeiro, Brazil
- Died: 29 April 2007 (aged 94); São Paulo, Brazil
- Occupations: Journalist; editor-in-chief; media mogul
- Known for: Owner of Folha de S. Paulo

Octavio Frias de Oliveira (5 August 1912 in Rio de Janeiro – 29 April 2007 in São Paulo) was a Brazilian businessman who gained recognition for turning newspaper Folha de S. Paulo – acquired by himself and partner Carlos Caldeira in August 1962 – into one of the most influential Brazilian media organizations. The newspaper became the cornerstone for a conglomerate called Grupo Folha.

== Work as a civil servant and the 1932 Revolution ==
Frias joined the rebel army as a volunteer during the 1932 Constitutional Revolution. He was stationed for two months in the Cunha region, upstate in the Paraíba River valley, and spent his twentieth birthday in the trenches; Frias took part in firefights and saw the death of some of his comrades in arms.

== Recognition ==
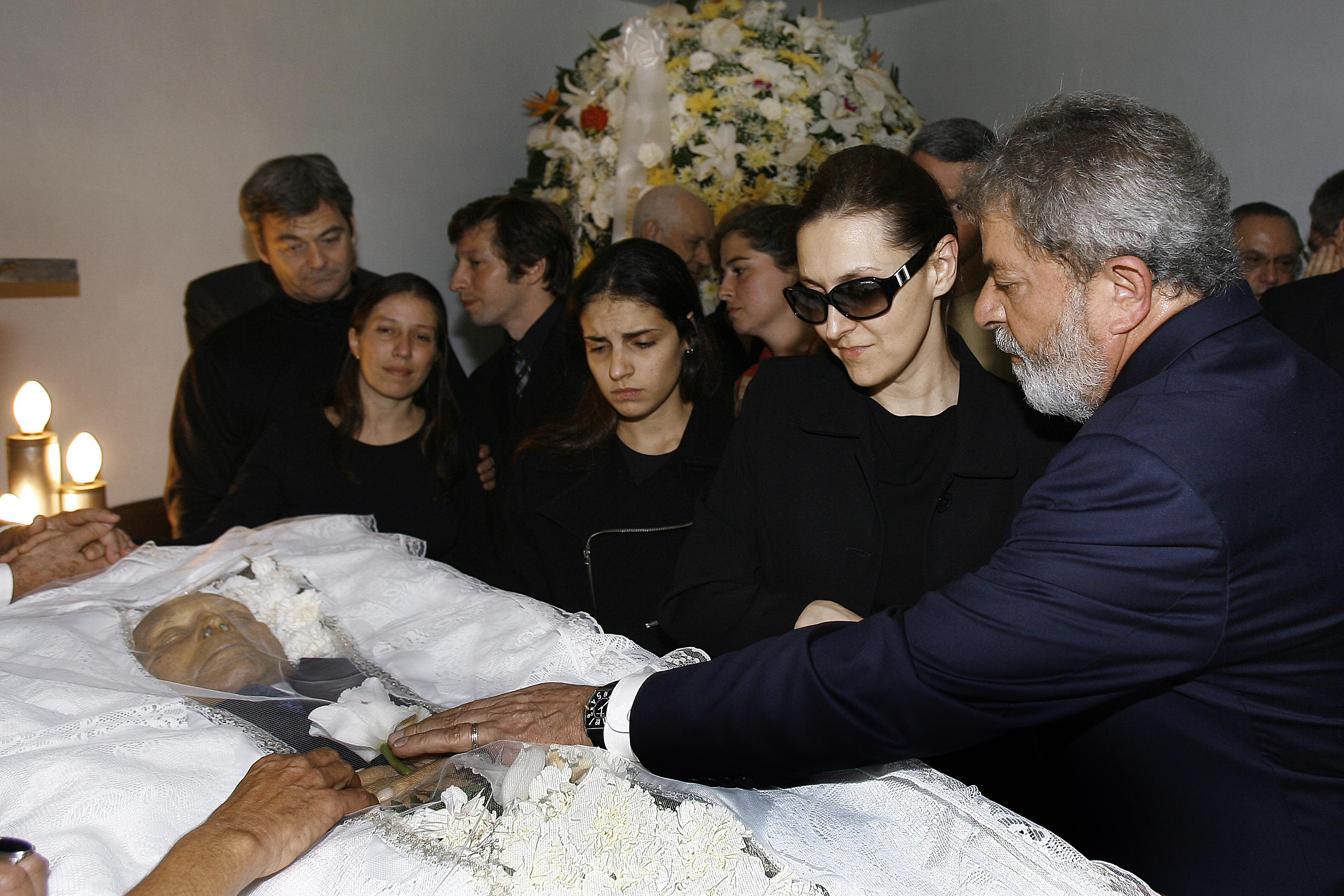
Then-President of Brazil Luiz Inácio Lula da Silva, during Octavio's funeral.

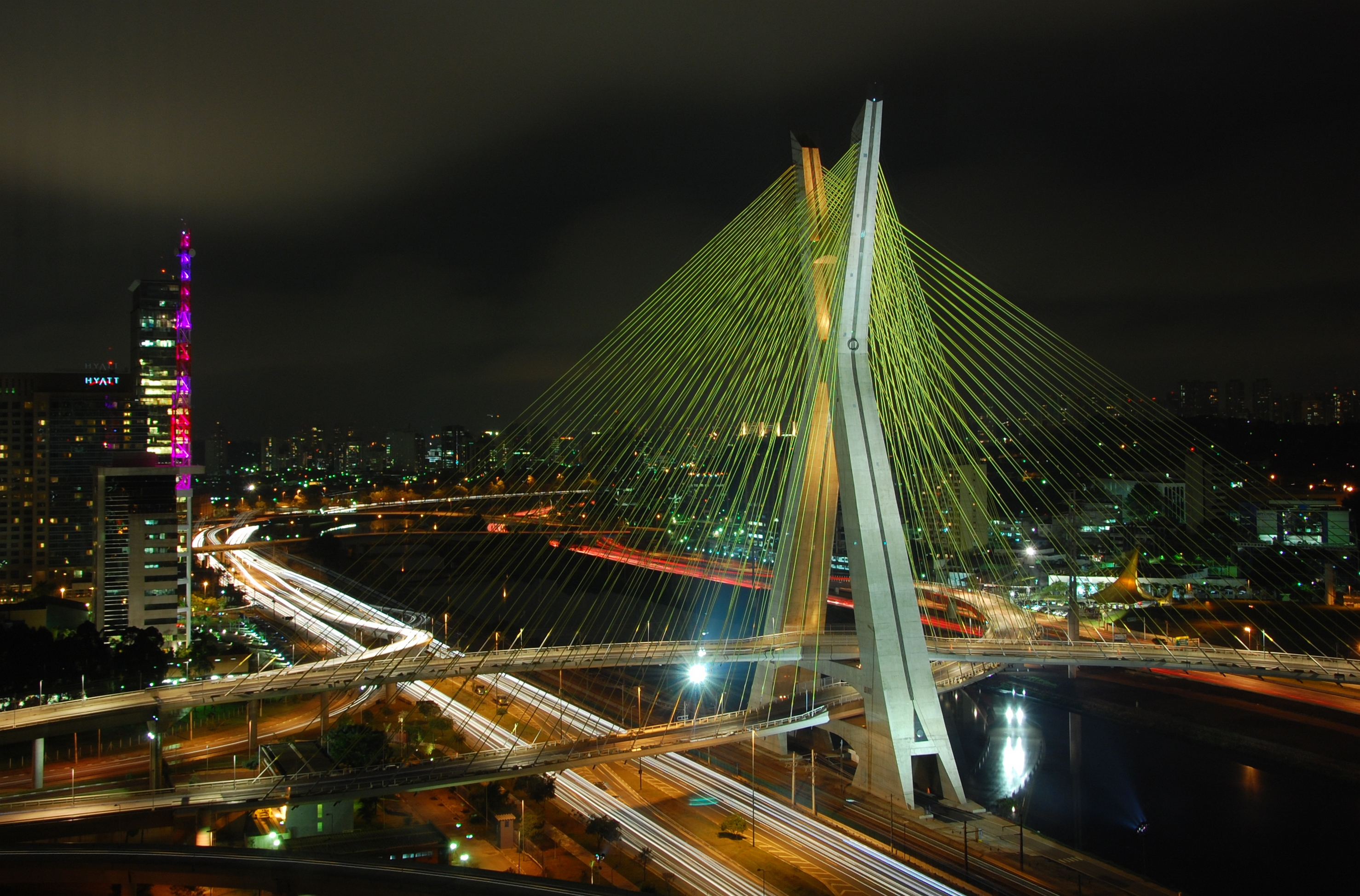
The Octávio Frias de Oliveira Bridge, in São Paulo, named after the businessman.

The institute and Folha partnered to create the Octavio Frias de Oliveira Award, to honor and support Brazilian efforts to prevent and fight cancer, and disseminate knowledge about the disease.
