= Grupo Folha =

Brazilian media conglomerate

Grupo Folha S.A.
- Type: Private
- Industry: Media conglomerate
- Founded: 1921
- Headquarters: São Paulo, Brazil
- Key people: Luís Frias (Chairman)
- Products: Newspaper, Publisher, Internet, Fintech
- Net income: R$ 67.5 million
- Number of employees: 6,800
- Website: Grupo Folha

Grupo Folha is the second largest Brazilian media conglomerate, after Grupo Globo. It was founded by Octávio Frias (1912–2007) and led by his son Luiz Frias since 1992.

The group publishes Folha de S.Paulo, the largest circulation paper in Brazil, which since 1986 keeps the leadership among quality general-interest newspapers in Brazil. In the last decade, the group nearly tripled its revenue, getting to R$ 2.7 billion in 2010. EBITDA reached R$600 million in 2011.

== Internet ==
UOL, controlled by Grupo Folha, is the leading Brazilian company for Web content and services, with 27.8 million unique visitors and about 4.3 billion pageviews every month. Launched in April 1996, UOL offered both Web access and content in a single package, becoming the leading ISP in the country.

By the end of 2011, the group closed UOL's capital, buying back more than 17 million shares from minority shareholders and reaching more than 74% stock ownership; the group of shareholders led by businessman João Alves de Queiroz Filho, controller of the holding Hypermarcas, remained as a minority shareholder at UOL, with 25% of shares. Grupo Folha keeps the management.

== Other ventures ==
Grupo Folha owns business units Transfolha (logistics) and Folhagráfica (printing). It also owns shares at Plural (printing) and SPDL (logistics).

Plural, a 50-50 joint-venture with Quad/Graphics controlled by Grupo Folha, is the main graphic industry with offset printing presses in South America. SPDL is a partnership between Folha (50%) and Estado (50%) groups, which distributes the newspapers by both companies.
