= List of Brazilian journalists =

This is a list of Brazilian journalists, those born in Brazil and who have established citizenship or residency.

- Amaury Ribeiro Jr.
- Ana Maria Bahiana
- Ana Maria Braga
- Ana Maria Machado
- Ana Paula Araújo
- Ana Paula Padrão
- Andrei Netto
- Adalgisa Nery
- Adísia Sá
- Alberto Dines
- Alceu Amoroso Lima
- Artur da Távola
- Assis Chateaubriand
- Austregésilo de Athayde
- Bernardo Carvalho
- Boris Casoy
- Carlos Lacerda
- Carlos Nascimento
- Cid Moreira
- Cláudio Abramo
- Clóvis Beviláqua
- Carlos Heitor Cony
- Ciro Pessoa
- Cornélio Pires
- Claudio Tognolli
- Chico Pinheiro
- Cristiana Lôbo
- Coelho Neto
- Domingo Alzugaray
- Dulce Damasceno de Brito
- Edgard Leuenroth
- Edinaldo Filgueira
- Elio Gaspari
- Elsie Lessa
- Elvira Lobato
- Ethevaldo Mello de Siqueira
- Fátima Bernardes
- Fausto Silva
- Francisco de Sales Torres Homem
- Franklin Távora
- Gilberto Dimenstein
- Glória Maria
- Gustavo Barroso
- Heraldo Pereira
- João do Rio
- José-Itamar de Freitas
- Josimar Melo
- Joyce Cavalccante
- Juliana Sakae
- Leandro Narloch
- Leilane Neubarth
- Leonardo Gagliano
- Líbero Badaró
- Lourival Fontes
- Luana Maluf
- Lucius de Mello
- Luís Cristóvão dos Santos
- Márcia Mendes
- Maria da Cunha
- Maria Inês Nassif
- Maria Júlia Coutinho
- Manuel de Araújo Porto-alegre
- Marina Colasanti
- Mário Filho
- Mauri König
- Mino Carta
- Monalisa Perrone
- Monteiro Lobato
- Natuza Nery
- Narciso Vernizzi
- Nélson Rodrigues
- Otto Maria Carpeaux
- Palmério Dória
- Patrícia Poeta
- Paulo Francis
- Paulo Henrique Amorim
- Paulo Marques
- Pedro Bloch
- Péricles Azambuja
- Perseu Abramo
- Poliana Abritta
- Rachel de Queiroz
- Rachel Sheherazade
- Reinaldo Azevedo
- Renata Vasconcellos
- Ricardo Amorim
- Ricardo Boechat
- Ricardo Kotscho
- Rubem Braga
- Roberto Civita
- Rosental Alves
- Samuel Wainer
- Sandra Annenberg
- Sebastião Nery
- Sérgio Buarque de Holanda
- Sérgio de Souza
- Solange Bibas
- Sud Mennucci
- Sylvia de Arruda Botelho Bittencourt
- Tariq Saleh
- Tim Lopes
- Vladimir Herzog
- Waldemar Cordeiro
- William Bonner
- Zileide Silva
- Zuenir Ventura
