= Cristóvão =

Cristóvão is the Portuguese version of the name Christopher, it may refer to:

Given name:

- Cristóvão de Aguiar (born 1940), Portuguese writer
- Cristóvão Borges (born 1959), Brazilian former footballer
- Cristóvão Colombo (Christopher Columbus) (1451–1506), Italian explorer, navigator, and colonist
- Cristóvão da Costa, 16th-century Portuguese civil lawyer
- Cristóvão da Costa (botanist) (1525–1594), Portuguese doctor and natural historian
- Cristóvão Falcão (1512–1557), Portuguese poet
- Cristóvão Ferreira (1580–1650), Portuguese Jesuit missionary to Japan who became an apostate just to save his life and his fellow priests. He later recanted .
- Cristóvão de Figueiredo (died c. 1540), Portuguese Renaissance painter
- Cristóvão da Gama (1516–1542), Portuguese military commander who led a crusade in Ethiopia and Somalia
- Cristóvão Jacques (c. 1480 – after 1530), Portuguese noble of Aragonese descent
- Cristóvão Jacques (astronomer), minor planet discoverer
- Cristóvão Lins (born 1529), German colonizer in Brazil
- Cristóvão Lopes (1516–1594), Portuguese painter
- Cristóvão Soares de Melo (died 1584), Portuguese colonial administrator
- Cristóvão de Mendonça (1475–1532), Portuguese noble and explorer in South East Asia
- Cristóvão de Morais, Portuguese court painter for the kings John III and Sebastian I of Portugal
- Cristóvão Ramos (born 1983), Portuguese footballer
- Cristóvão de Moura, 1st Marquis of Castelo Rodrigo (1538–1613), Portuguese nobleman
- Luís Cristóvão dos Santos (born 1916), Brazilian journalist and writer
- Cristóvão Swingue (born 1976), former Angolan basketball player
- Cristóvão de Távora, Portuguese colonial administrator
- Cristóvão Tezza (born 1952), Brazilian novelist and university professor

Surname:

- Alexandre Cristóvão (born 1993), Angolan footballer
- Hélder Cristóvão (born 1971), Portuguese footballer
- Jorge Manuel Guerreiro Cristóvão (born 1965), Portuguese footballer
- Pedro Cristóvão (born 1965), Portuguese judoka

== See also ==
- São Cristóvão (disambiguation), Portuguese for Saint Christopher
