= Carlos Drummond de Andrade =

Brazilian poet and writer

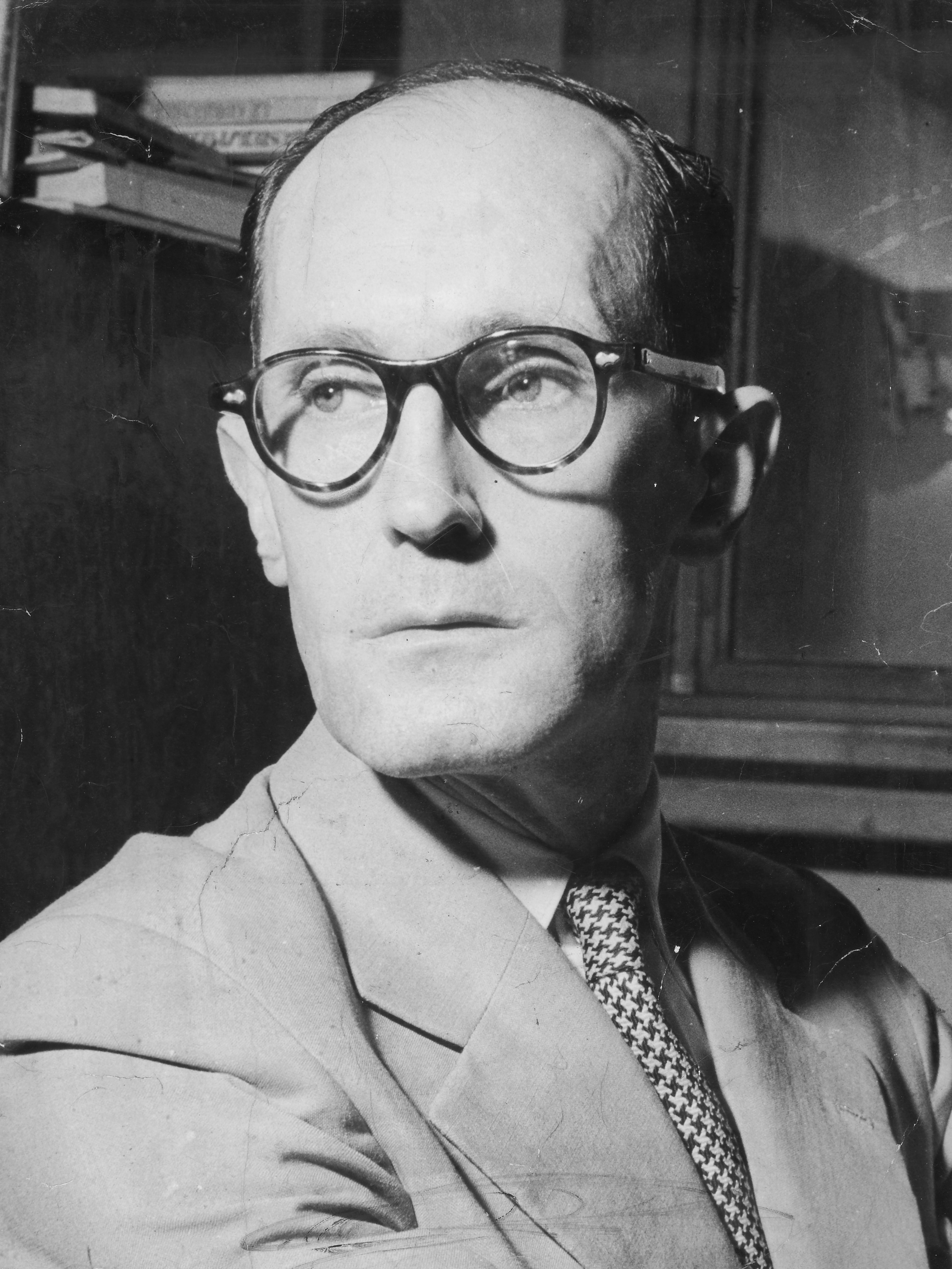
- Born: October 31, 1902; Itabira, Minas Gerais, Brazil
- Died: August 17, 1987 (aged 84); Rio de Janeiro, Brazil
- Occupation: Poet
- Writing career
- Movement: Modernism

Signature
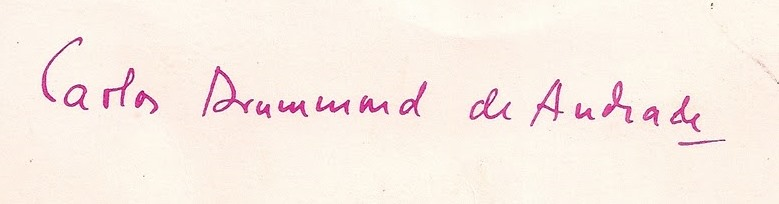

Carlos Drummond de Andrade (Brazilian Portuguese pronunciation: [ˈkaʁluz dɾuˈmõ dʒi ɐ̃ˈdɾadʒi]; October 31, 1902 – August 17, 1987) was a Brazilian poet, short story writer, cronista, and translator, considered by some as the greatest Brazilian poet of all time.

He has become something of a national cultural symbol in Brazil, where his widely influential poem "Canção Amiga" ("Friendly Song") has been featured on the 50-cruzado novo bill.

== Biography ==
Drummond was born in Itabira, a mining village in Minas Gerais in the southeastern region of Brazil. His parents were farmers belonging to old Brazilian families of mainly Portuguese origin. He went to a school of pharmacy in Belo Horizonte, but never worked as a pharmacist after graduation. He worked as a civil servant for most of his life, eventually becoming director of history for the National Historical and Artistic Heritage Service of Brazil.

Drummond drifted towards communism at the start of World War II and took up the editorship of the Brazilian Communist Party's official newspaper, Tribuna Popular, but later abandoned the post due to disagreements over censorship, which Drummond staunchly opposed.

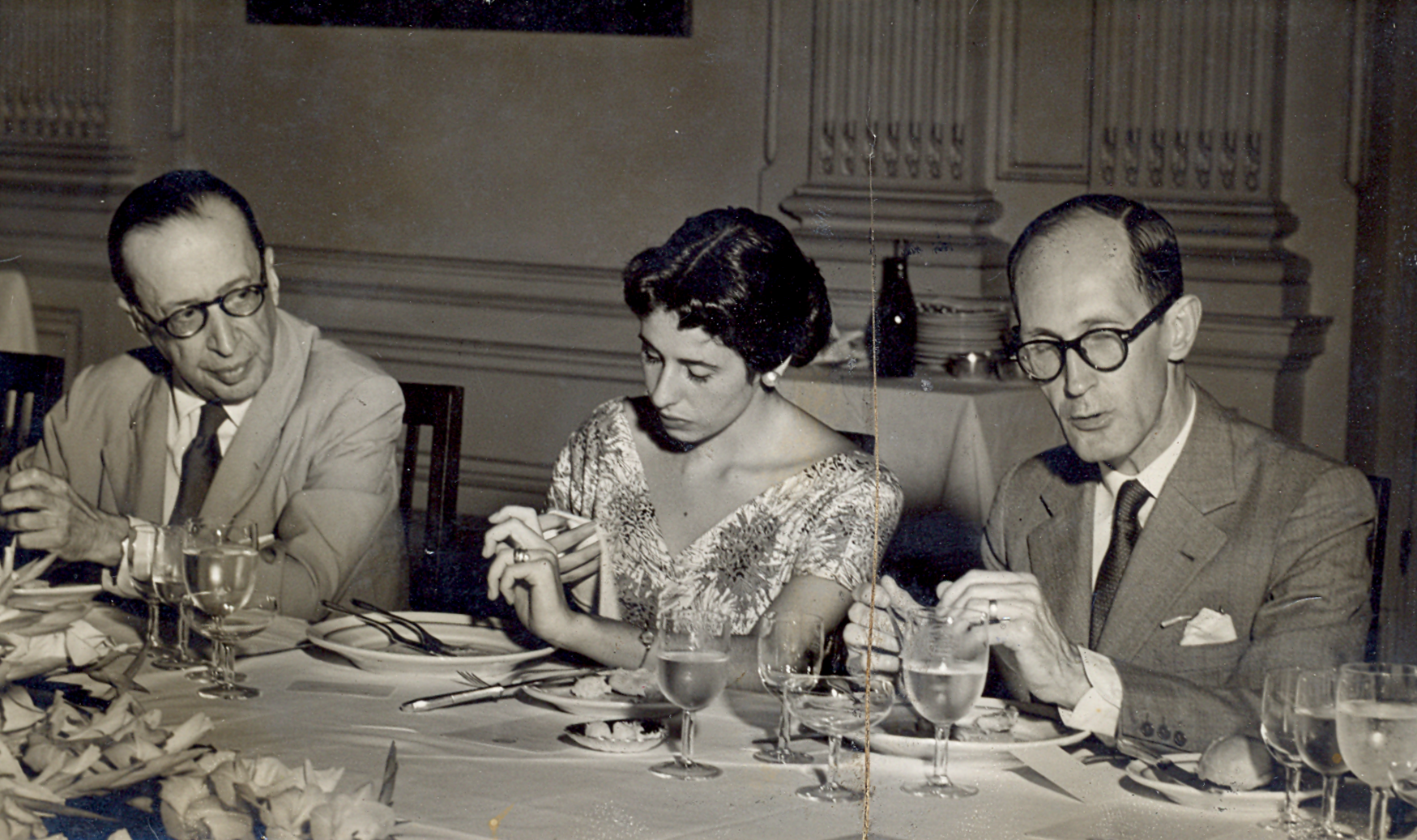
Manuel Bandeira and Carlos Drummond de Andrade, 1954. National Archives of Brazil

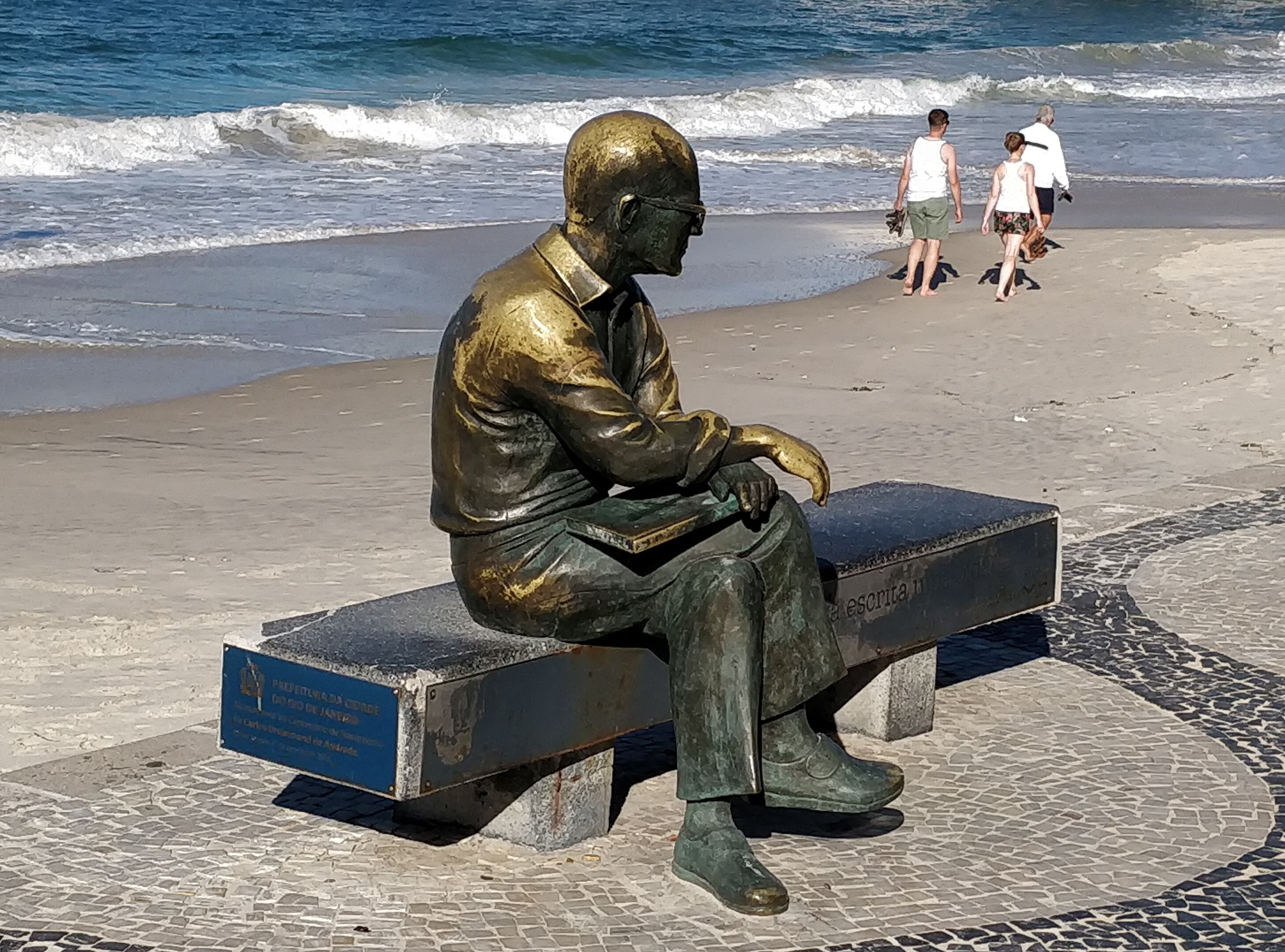
Statue of Carlos Drummond de Andrade by Copacabana Beach

Drummond's work has been translated by American poets including Mark Strand and Lloyd Schwartz. Later writers and critics have sometimes credited his relationship with Elizabeth Bishop, his first English language translator, as influential for his American reception, but though she admired him, Bishop claimed she barely even knew him. In an interview with George Starbuck in 1977, she said, "I didn't know him at all. He's supposed to be very shy. I'm supposed to be very shy. We've met once — on the sidewalk at night. We had just come out of the same restaurant, and he kissed my hand politely when we were introduced."

He translated Honoré de Balzac's Les paysans, Choderlos de Laclos's Les Liaisons dangereuses, and François Mauriac's Thérèse Desqueyroux.

== Style ==
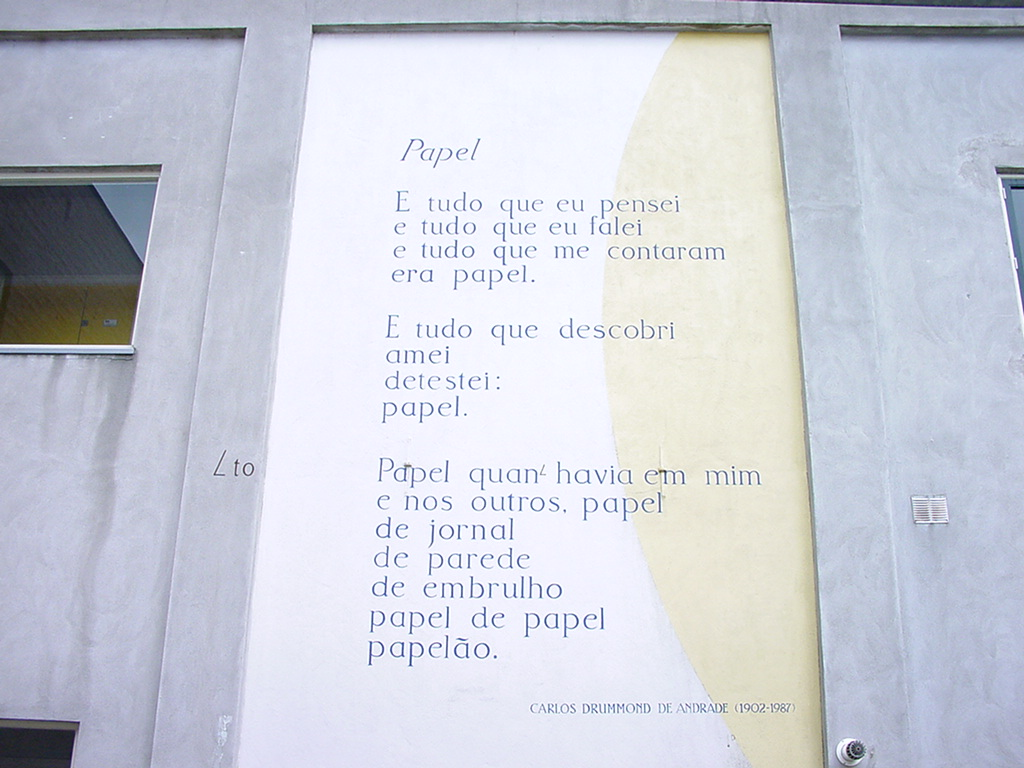
Poem by Drummond de Andrade on a wall in Leiden

Drummond adopted the new forms of Brazilian modernism that were evolving in the 1920s, inspired by the work of Mário de Andrade and Oswald de Andrade, making use of free verse, and not depending on a fixed meter.

Drummond was the first poet to assert himself after the premiere modernist of Brazil and created a unique style dominated by his writing. In 1994, Alfredo Bosi said that "The work of Drummond reaches – as Fernando Pessoa, Jorge de Lima, Murilo Mendes, and Herberto Helder – a coefficient of loneliness that detached from the soil of history, leading the reader to an attitude-free of references, trademarks or ideological or prospective".

In the late 1980s, his poetry began to become more erotic. O Amor Natural (Natural Love), a collection of erotic poems, was published posthumously. The book inspired the 1996 Dutch documentary film O Amor Natural.

== Legacy ==
On 31 October 2019, Google celebrated his 117th birthday with a Google Doodle.

== Bibliography ==
=== Poetry ===
- (1930) 'Alguma Poesia' (Some Poetry)
- (1934) 'Brejo das Almas'
- (1940) 'Sentimento do Mundo' (The feeling of the world)
- (1942) José
- (1945) 'A Rosa do Povo' (The People's Rose)
- (1951) 'Claro Enigma' (Clear Enigma)
- (1954) 'Fazendeiro do Ar'
- (1954) 'Quadrilha'
- (1955) 'Viola de Bolso'
- (1964) 'Lição de Coisas' (Lesson of Things)
- (1968) 'Boitempo'
- (1968) 'A Falta Que Ama'
- (1968) 'Nudez' (Nudity)
- (1973) 'As Impurezas do Branco' (The Impurity of the White)
- (1973) 'Menino Antigo' (Boitempo II)
- (1977) 'A Visita' (The Visit)
- (1977) 'Discurso do Primavera e Alguma Sombra'
- (1978) 'O Marginal Clorildo Gato'
- (1979) 'Esquecer para Lembrar' (Boitempo III)
- (1980) 'A Paixão de Medida'
- (1983) 'Caso do Vestido'
- Corpo (1984)
- Amar se aprende amando (1985)
- Poesia Errante (1988)
- O Amor Natural (1992)
- Farewell (1996)
- Os ombros suportam o mundo(1935)
- Futebol a arte (1970)
- Antologia poética:
- A última pedra no meu caminho (1950)
- 50 poemas escolhidos pelo autor (1956)
- Antologia Poética (1962)
- Antologia Poética (1965)
- Seleta em Prosa e Verso (1971)
- Amor, Amores (1975)
- Carmina drummondiana (1982)
- Boitempo I e Boitempo II (1987)
- Minha morte (1987)
- O Elefante (1983)
- História de dois amores (1985)
- O pintinho (1988)
- Carol e Dinha(2009)

=== Prose ===
- Confissões de Minas (1944)
- Contos de Aprendiz (1951)
- Passeios na Ilha (1952)
- Fala, amendoeira (1957)
- A bolsa & a vida (1962)
- Cadeira de balanço (1966)
- Caminhos de João Brandão (1970)
- O poder ultrajovem e mais 79 textos em prosa e verso (1972)
- De notícias & não-notícias faz-se a crônica (1974)
- Os dias lindos (1977)
- 70 historinhas (1978)
- Contos plausíveis (1981)
- Boca de luar (1984)
- O observador no escritório (1985)
- Tempo vida poesia (1986)
- Moça deitada na grama (1987)
- O avesso das coisas (1988)
- Auto-retrato e outras crônicas (1989)
- As histórias das muralhas (1989)

=== English translations ===
- Souvenir of the Ancient World, translated by Mark Strand (Antaeus Editions, 1976)
- Looking for Poetry: Poems by Carlos Drummond de Andrade and Rafael Alberti, with Songs from the Quechua, translated by Mark Strand (Knopf, 2002)
- Traveling in the Family : Selected Poems of Carlos Drummond de Andrade, edited by Thomas Colchie and Mark Strand (Random House, 1986)
- The Minus Sign: Selected Poems, translated by Virginia de Araujo (Black Swan, 1980)
- In the Middle of the Road; Selected Poems, translated by John A Nist (U of Arizona, 1965)
- Multitudinous Heart: Selected Poems: A Bilingual Edition, translated by Richard Zenith (Farrar, Straus and Giroux, 2015)

== Reviews ==
- Pontiero, Giovanni, (1982), review of The Minus Sign, in Cencrastus No. 9, Summer 1982, p. 47, ISSN 0264-0856
