= Alberto Rangel =

Brazilian engineer, writer, and historian

- Born: 29 May 1945
- Died: 14 December 1945 (aged 74); Nova Friburgo, Brazil
- Citizenship: Brazil
- Occupation: Writer

Alberto do Rego Rangel (29 May 1871 – 14 December 1945) was a Brazilian engineer and writer.

He graduated with a degree in engineering from the Escola Militar do Rio de Janeiro, in 1899. The following year, with the rank of Ensign, he commanded an artillery brigade during the Brazilian Naval Revolts. After participating in engineering projects in Maranhão and Pará, he left the army (which he criticized in the pamphlet Fora de forma (Out of Shape), in 1900) and he moved to Amazonas, where he was the general director of Lands and Colonization, under Governor Antônio Constantino Nery.

While he was working for the government in Amazonas, he wrote his first book, a collection of stories titled Inferno Verde (Green Inferno). The work was not published until 1908, with a preface by the Brazilian writer and journalist Euclides da Cunha, with whom he had been friends in military school. He entered diplomatic service and traveled to France, England, Spain, and Portugal. In this period, he researched the documents that would become the basis for books on history and biography. He was also commissioned to write an index of historical documents of the exiled Brazilian emperor Pedro II. He also continued to write stories. At the beginning of the World War II, he left his position in the Brazilian consulate in Paris and returned to Rio de Janeiro.

== Works ==
- 1900 – Fora de forma
- 1908 – Inferno Verde (cenas e cenários do Amazonas)
- 1913 – Sombras n’água: vida e paisagens no Brasil equatorial
- 1914 – Rumos e perspectivas
- 1915 – Quinzenas de campo e guerra
- 1916 – D. Pedro I e a Marquesa de Santos
- 1919 – Quando o Brasil amanhecia
- 1921 – Livro de figuras
- 1924 – Lume e cinza
- 1927 – Textos e pretextos
- 1928 – Papéis pintados
- 1930 – Fura-mundo!
- 1935 – Gastão de Orléans – o último Conde d’Eu
- 1937 – No rolar do tempo – opiniões e testemunhos respigados no Arquivo do Orsay – Paris
- 1945 – A Educação do Príncipe – Esboço crítico e histórico sobre o Ensino de D. Pedro II
- 1945 – Águas revessas
