= Adalgisa Nery =

Brazilian poet, journalist and politician (1905–1980)

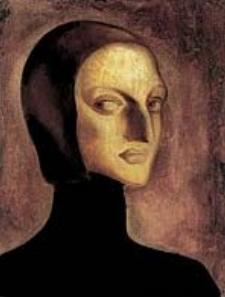
- Portrait of the Brazilian writer Adalgisa Nery, by her first husband, painter Ismael Nery (died in 1934)
- Born: October 29, 1905; Rio de Janeiro, Brazil
- Died: June 7, 1980 (aged 74)
- Occupations: Poet, Journalist, Politician
- Notable work: Poemas, A mulher ausente, Og, Ar do deserto, Cantas de angústia, As fronteiras da quarta dimensão, A imaginária, Mundos oscilantes, Retrato sem retoque, 22 menos 1, Neblina, Erosão
- Spouses: Ismael Nery (m. 1922–1934), Lourival Fontes (m. 1940–1953)

Adalgisa Nery (October 29, 1905 – June 7, 1980) was a Brazilian poet, journalist and politician.

== Biography ==
She was born in Rio de Janeiro as Adalgisa Maria Feliciana Noel Cancela Ferreira, the daughter of a civil servant. In 1922 she married Ismael Nery (1900–1934), a painter and poet who introduced Adalgisa to a circle of Brazilian artists and intellectuals that included Manuel Bandeira, Jorge de Lima and Murilo Mendes. The Nerys lived in Europe from 1927 to 1929, where they met the artist Marc Chagall and the Brazilian composer Heitor Villa-Lobos. Ismael died of tuberculosis in 1934, leaving Adalgisa with two sons.

Nery began to publish poetry and fiction after her first husband's death. Her first book, Poemas, published in 1937, received critical acclaim, and she wrote short stories and magazine articles. Although the poet Murilo Mendes had proposed marriage to Nery in the late 1930s, she married in 1940 Lourival Fontes (1899–1967), director general of the Department of Press and Propaganda (DIP). In the dictatorship ("Estado Novo") of Getúlio Vargas, the DIP was in charge of censorship. Nery assisted the DIP as a social director and public relations officer. When Fontes was named Brazilian ambassador to Mexico in 1944, Nery accompanied him and met Diego Rivera (who painted Nery's portrait), Frida Kahlo, José Clemente Orozco and David Alfaro Siqueiros.

After Nery and Fontes separated in 1953, Nery began the political phase of her career. As a columnist for the Rio de Janeiro newspaper Última Hora from 1954 to 1966, she advocated socialism and Brazilian nationalism. The success of her newspaper column helped Nery to be elected as a member of the constituent assembly for Guanabara State (now the city of Rio de Janeiro) in 1960 for the left-wing Brazilian Socialist Party (PSB). Nery distinguished herself in the state legislature for her opposition to Guanabara Governor Carlos Lacerda and her high ethical standards. She was reelected to the state legislature in 1962 and 1966. After the military regime banned political parties in 1965, Nery joined the Brazilian Democratic Movement (MDB), which was the official opposition to the military regime. In 1969, the military junta then governing Brazil ended Nery's mandate and stripped her of the right to run for office or vote for 10 years.

Nery spent the last years of her life in increasing depression and seclusion. She died in a retirement home in Rio de Janeiro.

Various short stories and poems by Nery have been translated into English, French, German and Italian.

== Works ==
- Poemas 1937
- A mulher ausente (poems) 1940
- Og (short stories) 1943
- Ar do deserto (poems) 1943
- Cantas de angústia (poems) 1948
- As fronteiras da quarta dimensão (poems) 1952
- A imaginária (novel) 1959
- Mundos oscilantes (poems) 1962
- Retrato sem retoque (collection of newspaper columns) 1966
- 22 menos 1 (short stories) 1972
- Neblina (novel) 1972
- Erosão (poems) 1973
