= Orelhão =

Brazilian telephone booth

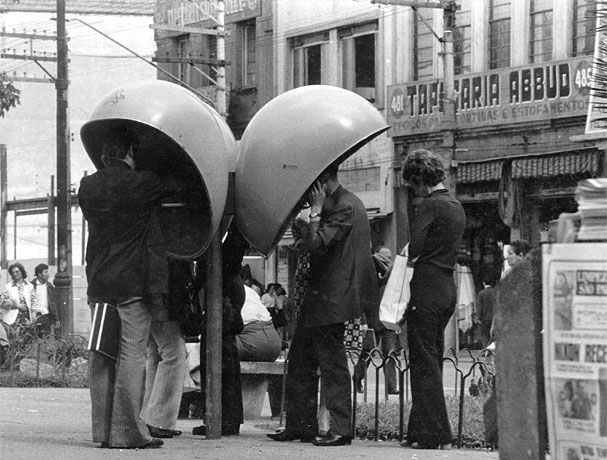
The triple tulip in the city of São Paulo

Orelhão, (Note: Portuguese pronunciation: [oɾeˈʎɐ̃w], lit. 'big ear'; plural: orelhões, pronounced [oɾeˈʎõjs])) officially Telefone de Uso Público (Note: Brazilian Portuguese pronunciation: [teleˈfoni dʒi ˈuzu ˈpubliku], transl. "public use telephone".) is the name given to the protector for public telephones designed by Chinese Brazilian architect and designer Chu Ming Silveira. It was created on 4 April 1972 and it was initially used in the cities of Rio de Janeiro and São Paulo. Later, they became present everywhere in Brazil, as well as in other Latin American countries such as Cuba, Peru, Colombia and Paraguay, in African countries like Angola and Mozambique, in China, and in other parts of the world.

== Background ==
The installation of the first public payphones in Brazil dates from the 1920s, when the population of the country at that time was around 30.6 million inhabitants. Equipped with a token box and adapted to a common device, these semi-public telephones were found in commercial establishments that signed a contract with Companhia Telefônica Brasileira (Brazilian Telephone Company), a company that was then responsible for telephone services in the states of São Paulo, Rio de Janeiro and Minas Gerais.

Actual public payphones only appeared on Brazilian streets in mid-1971, when more than 93 million people were living in the country and mobile phones had not been created yet. The first cell phone would only be released two years later, being available to very few people.

Out of the almost 100 million inhabitants of Brazil, 52 million lived in urban areas, according to IBGE data. In many places, due to the noise, listening and being heard from a public phone installed in the middle of the street was difficult. Attempting to solve the issue, CTB developed circular fiberglass and acrylic cabins and, to test the novelty, installed 13 of them in the city of São Paulo. The result did not please the company, that detected an inadequate use of the equipment, a high rate of vandalism, and concluded that the spacious cabin, besides being uncomfortable, ended up bothering the passersby, obstructing the narrow sidewalks.

Facing this disappointing diagnosis, architect Chu Ming Silveira went on to work on the project that would result in one of the greatest icons of Brazilian design. The challenge was not small, as can be concluded from the detailed descriptive memo prepared by Chu Ming, who at that time headed the projects section of the Engineering Department of the Brazilian Telephony Company. Design and acoustics suited to Brazilian climatic conditions were at the root of the problem and the solution proposed by Chu Ming would eventually meet, with great success, the whole series of needs she had listed:

1. Phone protection.
2. User protection.
3. Low manufacturing and maintenance cost.
4. Low cost and simplicity of installation.
5. Durability and resistance to weather, and wear and tear.
6. Flexibility to adjust to areas of different concentrations.
7. Good acoustics.
8. Good aesthetics.
9. Attractiveness to the public.
10. Operational simplicity.
11. Possibility of uninterrupted use.
12. Good image of service to the public.
13. Institution of one more element in the urban landscape.
14. Ergonometrical satisfaction of Brazilian urban folk's fashion.

== Development ==
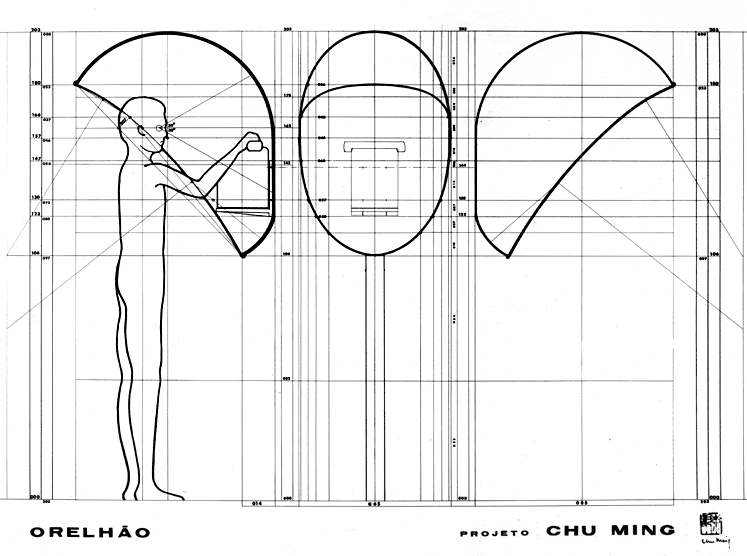
Original design of the orelhão

To achieve a cabin made of fiberglass, which should be strong, very light, resistant to sun, rain and fire and, according to newspapers of the time, "cheap", Chu Ming Silveira started with an egg shape; according to her, it is "the best acoustic form". The curvature of the dome offered an acoustic protection of 70 to 90 decibels, provided the user was under it. Most of the outside noise reaching the "shield" was reflected out, the remainder converging to the center of the radius of curvature, located well below the ear of the average user, in order to minimize interference in communication.

Launched in 1972, the new booth soon started being incorporated into Brazilian landscapes. Although technically called "Chu II" by CTB and later immortalized as "orelhão," it gained a number of curious nicknames, such as "tulip" and "astronaut's helmet". The press adopted "tulip," which referred to the format of the set of 2 or 3 booths attached to the ground by an iron pipe through which the wires ran. The orange and blue "tulips" were equipped with red telephones produced in the Japanese city of Osaka, popularly called "reds" or "tamurinhas". For indoor environments, such as commercial and public offices, Chu Ming developed, before the orelhão, the "Chu I" or orelhinha ("small ear"), which was smaller and had an orange acrylic structure. It could be installed on a wall or adapted to different supports, at a height defined as the average of Brazilian men. The first ones were tested in mid-1971, in the lobby of CBT's headquarters building, at Rua 7 de Abril, central region of São Paulo.

On 20 January, the day of its patron saint Saint Sebastian, the city of Rio de Janeiro received the first Orelhões of the Brazilian Telephone Company. The newspaper O Diário de São Paulo reported on the anniversary of the city of São Paulo, on 25 January, to announce the arrival of the new phones on the streets of the city:

"... And on this day, São Paulo gets a gift from the Brazilian Telephone Company: 170 telephone booths of a new model, christened "tulip" by its creator, the Chinese architect Chu Ming."

Keeping the commemorative tone, the text highlighted the quality of the design of said "tulips", "in which the technique matches environmental beauty." According to the CTB, there were in São Paulo about 4,000 public telephones then, while the ideal number to meet the demand would be 22,500. The success of orelhão could be verified not only by the sympathy with which the population received it, but also by the increase of calls made from public telephones. In March 1972, CTB estimated that the installation of the new equipment would cause a 12% increase in the number of average daily calls.

== The success ==
Chu Ming's invention gained admirers, eventually crossing the Atlantic in 1973. In a visit to Rio de Janeiro, the Secretary of Communications of Mozambique showed an interest in the equipment and the result was that three orelhões "emigrated" to the African continent. Today, the orelhão and adaptations of it are found in Latin American countries such as Peru, Colombia, Paraguay, and other African countries, such as Angola, and even in China, the home country of its idealizer.

In the same year the Brazilian telephone booths were exported for the first time, Telecomunicações de São Paulo S.A. (TELESP), of the Telebrás group, replaced CTB as the company operating phone booths in the state of São Paulo. In 1975, blue orelhões for long-distance calls were released.

The demands considered by Chu Ming Silveira in the orelhão conception process seemed to be fully met, according to a comparative analysis of market research conducted for Telesp in 1977 and 1978: the public telephone service was considered "excellent" by 18.8% of respondents in 1977 and by 20.4% in the following year. It was considered "good" by 36.4% of respondents in 1977; by 1978, this number had increased to 37,7%. The phones, according to the survey, were used by 82% of the population, with 40% using it at least once a week. As for "modernity", in 1978, 73% of respondents agreed absolutely and 70% agreed that the orelhões were "very presentable"; 66% said they were "well-placed".

Despite its expressive recognition for usefulness and quality of service, acts of vandalism against the orelhões were frequent and numerous. The enormous money loss caused to Telesp motivated the hiring of the publicist José Zaragoza in 1980. He was to create a short film that later would become an icon of Brazilian publicity. Using elements of police chronicles, the film "The Death of the Orelhão" caused a strong impact, showing a device unable to be operated, having been vandalized. Also as part of this effort to curb vandals' attacks, Telesp invested in a new cabin format in concrete and colorless tempered glass, in April of the same year. Initially tested in the cities of São Paulo, Santos, Guarujá, São Vicente and Campinas, and then installed throughout the state, the new cabin was not well accepted.

In 1982, Telesp inaugurated the first community telephone in the Vila Prudente favela. The population developed a friendly relationship with the orelhão, as it made communication between the most distant and even unlikely places possible. A print advertisement in 1984 showed images of orelhões in different geographic settings of Brazil: on the beach, in the hills, in the typically rural area, on the side of a road. The text emphasized the companion character of the orelhão: "Telesp always puts a friendly little ear near you. On the coast, in the farms, on the roads, in the outskirts of São Paulo, on the streets, squares and avenues, you'll always find a friendly little ear to listen to you: Telesp's orelhões." Phone tokens were necessary to use the service. These were replaced by phone cards in 1992.

== Changes and decline ==
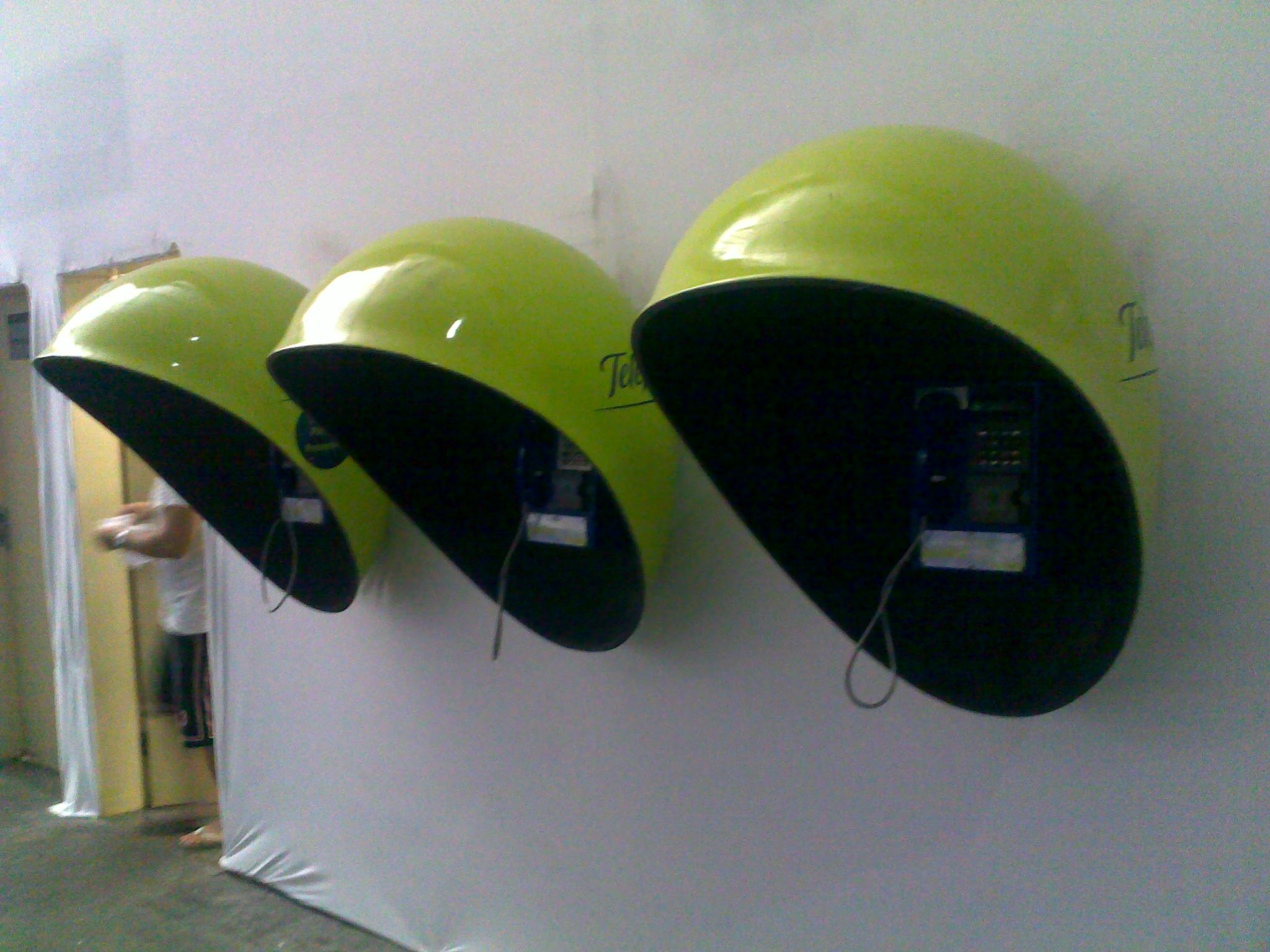
Orelhões painted lime-green

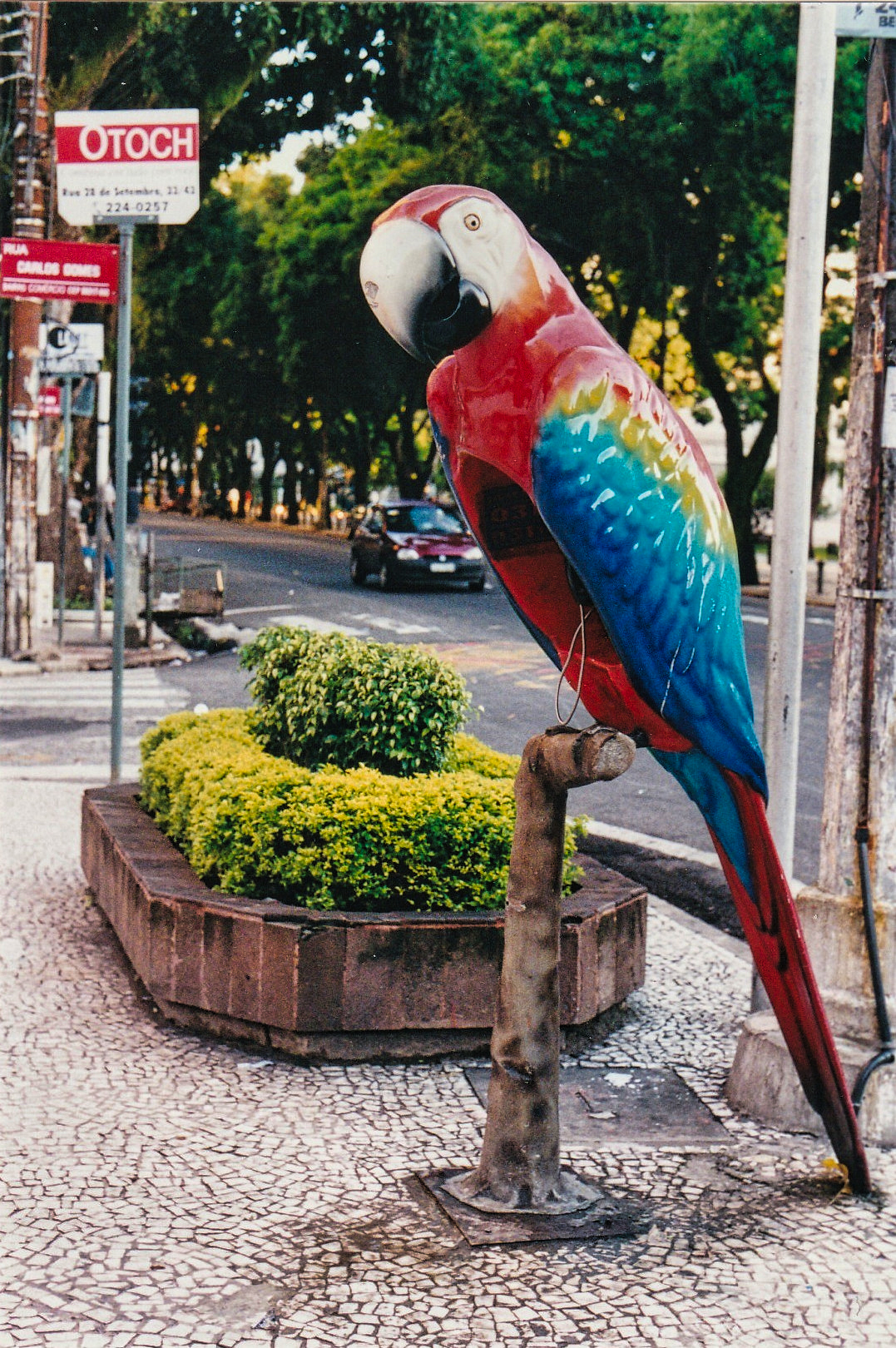
The special shape of an animal (here a parrot) in Belém, Pará.

On November 26, 1998, orelhões painted lime-green were seen for the first time, marking the acquisition of Telesp by Spanish company Telefónica. This was part of the privatization process resulting from the breakup of Telebrás that also affected eleven other companies.

New fiberglass "totems" were launched by the company in 1999, but the orelhão continued on the streets, as they were part of the daily life of Brazil. Currently, in the state of São Paulo, there are 210,000 of them, according to Telefónica. The trend is that this number will decrease, due to Anatel's ordinance reducing the minimum number of payphones throughout the country to 4 per thousand inhabitants, from the previous 6. Also the advance of mobile telephony has been contributing to the decline of public telephones. In December 2011, there were about 143 mobile phones per 100 inhabitants in the state of São Paulo.

At the beginning of 2012, there were 247,6 million cell phones throughout Brazil. At the same time, a survey by Telefónica found that the sale of phone cards fell 45% in the state of São Paulo, compared to the first half of 2011. The company has decided to deactivate the "tulips" from the 70s, but it should maintain the devices to ensure that users do not have to walk more than 300 metres (980 ft) to have access to one of these long-standing devices.

In her 70s almanac, "Memories and Curiosities of a Very Mad Decade", journalist and writer Ana Maria Bahiana places the arrival of the metro, the portable calculator and the computer in Brazil, the sports lottery and the orelhão among the wonders of modernity at that time.

Even though it has been declining in the 2010s, the orelhão, which has been fully incorporated into Brazilian street furniture, has reached its 40th anniversary and has consolidated its status as a world design icon and symbol of Brazil. Besides, it regained notability as a promotional symbol of the 2025 Brazilian film The Secret Agent.

== See also ==
- Telephone booth
- Public phone
