= Vernizzi =

Vernizzi is an Italian surname. Notable people with the surname include:

- Narciso Vernizzi (1918–2005), Brazilian sports journalist and radio personality
- Renato Vernizzi (1904–1972), Italian painter
- Rino Vernizzi (1946–2022), Italian bassoonist
