= Frederico Sólon de Sampaio Ribeiro =

Brazilian general (1839–1900)

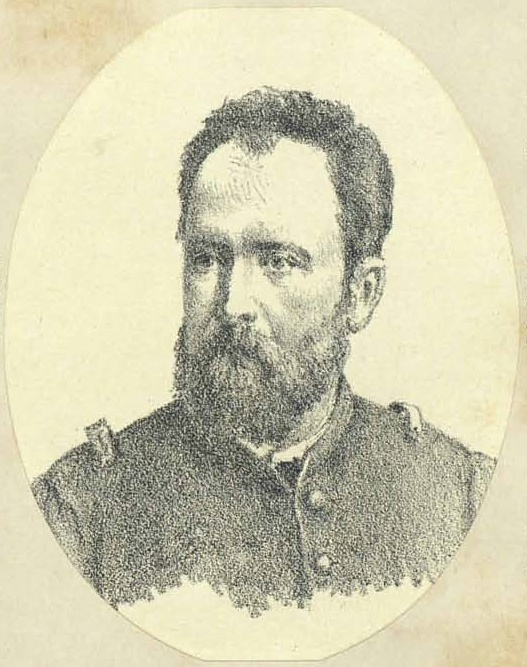
- Born: 1839; Porto Alegre, Rio Grande do Sul, Empire of Brazil
- Died: 1900 (aged 60–61) Belém, Pará, Brazil
- Allegiance: Empire of Brazil; Brazil
- Branch: Army
- Rank: General
- Conflicts: Paraguayan War

Frederico Sólon de Sampaio Ribeiro (1839–1900) was a Brazilian Army general and politician. He is best remembered for his role in the events that led to the Proclamation of the Republic.

On November 14 1889, Ribeiro spread false rumours that the government had ordered the arrest of Benjamin Constant and Deodoro da Fonseca, prompting the latter to carry out the coup that resulted in the Brazilian Republic.

== Biography ==
Born in Porto Alegre, Ribeiro was the son of a farmer. In 1857, he joined the Brazilian Army and later fought in the Paraguayan War. Over time, he rose through the military ranks, eventually attaining the position of divisional general in 1899.

A republican activist associated with the positivist school, he was appointed governor of Mato Grosso with the mission of suppressing the legislative elections and securing the victory of the political faction of Generoso Ponce. He served from February to April 1891, and was later elected as federal deputy for the same state. Ribeiro was the father-in-law of the writer Euclides da Cunha.
