= José Carlos Rodrigues =

Brazilian journalist

José Carlos Rodrigues (Cantagallo 19 June 1844 – Paris 28 June 1922) was a Brazilian journalist, financial expert, and philanthropist, with connections to both the United States and Great Britain.

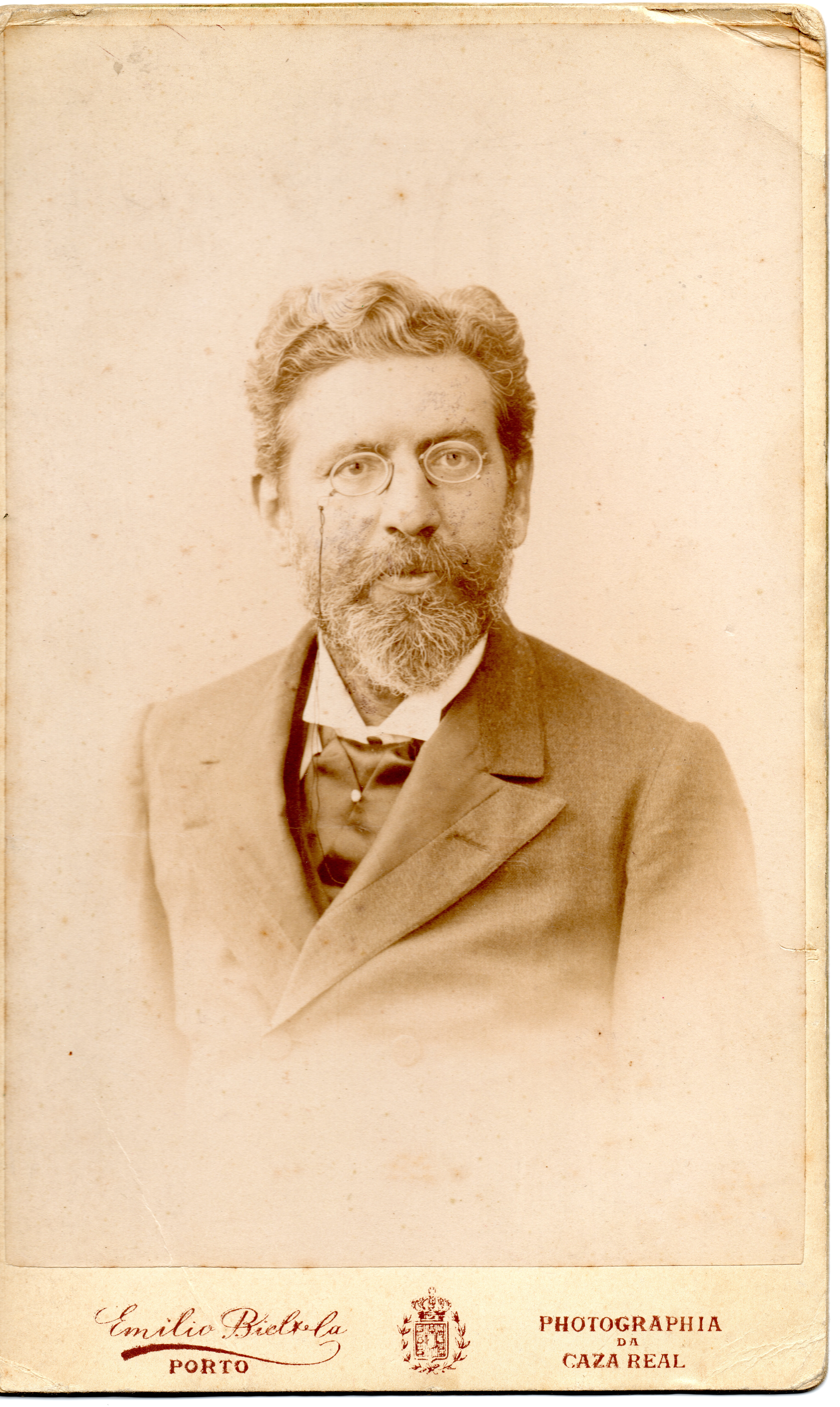
Photograph of Jose Carlos Rodrigues (1844-1922)

== Early life ==
He was born in Cantagallo in the province of Rio de Janeiro, the son of a farmer with extensive coffee estates manned by slaves. After inheriting from an aunt, he freed his slaves before emancipation came about in Brazil. He was educated at the São Paulo Law School, and on one of his rides there was converted to a non-denominational Protestantism by reading a Bible found in a house he stayed in. This gave him both work when he needed it as a young man and an absorbing subject of study in his old age.

He was a born journalist; like so many in that profession he started at university, contributing to newspapers and even founding a law review. At nineteen he published an annotated edition of the Brazilian constitution that went through ten editions. After he graduated he began to practise law in Rio, and soon one of his law professors became Minister of Finance and made José Carlos his aide. This was presumably the foundation for his later expertise in financial journalism, and could have launched him early on a brilliant legal and perhaps political career in Brazil. But after a short time he was charged, apparently correctly, with financial irregularity, and fled to the United States. He did not return to Brazil for twenty years, when a statute of limitations meant that he was free from the threat of prosecution.

== In the United States ==
He went first to Lowell, Massachusetts, and then to New York City. Arriving from Rio almost penniless, he made his living to begin with by translations from English into Portuguese. Some were for a religious society which produced tracts, little works on morals or doctrine which were distributed in great numbers in most Protestant countries. In the early 1870s Rodrigues spent some time in Washington, D.C., where he spent months translating for the Attorney General many pages of American documents on the Alabama claims dispute between the US and Britain.

He did not lose touch with Brazil, let alone contemplate becoming an American citizen. He was in correspondence with Joaquim Saldanha Marinho a little before Marinho, a keen Mason, became the leader of the newly formed Republican Party in 1870. He began sending long monthly dispatches to an eminent Brazilian newspaper, the Jornal do Commercio – years later he was to become its editor. He also wrote articles for The Nation about Latin America. With the aid of a New Yorker in the Amazon rubber business, he started his own monthly magazine O Novo Mundo (New World) which reached a circulation of 8000 in Brazil and informed his countrymen “of American ingenuity and progress in all fields”. It ran from 1870 to 1879 and was the only one of nearly 400 foreign language journals published in the United States which was intended not for immigrants but for readers in another country. His secretary and collaborator was the pioneering Modernist poet Joaquim de Sousa Andrade.

In 1876 he helped with the Brazilian exhibit at the great international Philadelphia Exposition. Emperor Pedro II of Brazil visited the United States for it. Rodrigues had called for him to abdicate and establish a republic in articles which were reprinted in Brazil. Nevertheless in recognition for José Carlos’ help over the years for relations between Brazil and the US the emperor climbed the stairs to the humble office of O Novo Mondo to thank its editor in person.

Over the New Year of 1880 Ferdinand de Lesseps made a triumphal tour to see how the work on the Panama Canal was going. José Carlos, as a reporter for the New York World, was part of an American party including the boss and members of the already built Panama Railroad and two army engineers which accompanied him. What Rodrigues wrote in the New York World interested the American President Rutherford B. Hayes so much that he was invited to the White House later in 1880 to discuss the matter. In 1885 Rodrigues wrote articles on the canal for the London Financial News which were reprinted as The Panama Canal: its History, its Political Aspects and Financial Difficulties. After the Americans had completed the canal, President Theodore Roosevelt wrote to Rodrigues “You were a prophet! And I fulfilled your prophecy.”

== Based in Brazil again ==
In 1882 José Carlos accepted an invitation to raise capital for Brazilian enterprises, especially railway construction. This meant moving to the great world financial centre of London. He there, at the age of 38, met the 15-year-old girl who became his wife. On his return to Rio in 1890 he bought with the aid of loyal friends the Jornal do Comercio, for which he had continued writing. Brazil had become a republic in 1889 and José Carlos had to hide for months in a house his butler had in the hills. He wrote a life of Christ and finally escaped in disguise on a British liner bound for London and his worried wife. But democratic government returned, and José Carlos again became a trusted adviser to the authorities, handling important financial business on his annual trips to London. The Brazilian Finance Minister wrote in an official report in 1901 “None more competent than he is by reason of his patriotism, his personal honesty, his close community with the financial policy of the Government, his intimate knowledge of the subject, and his acquaintance with the people and ways of his field of action.”

Railways in Brazil were still largely financed and indeed owned by the British, and in 1902 José Carlos acted for the Brazilian government in unsuccessful attempts to buy two small railway companies, the Alagoas and the Rio Grande do Sul, from their largely British owners. When Brazil and the United States first exchanged ambassadors, the Brazilian who went to Washington, Joaquim Nabuco, was a friend of Rodrigues, someone who used him as a confidant. The Jornal do Comercio became more influential than ever. It was even widely considered the voice of the Brazilian Foreign Ministry and the most reliable source in Brazil on the United States. When Rio Branco was Foreign Minister he was very close to Rodrigues, frequently visiting his editorial offices.

The Times in London published at the end of 1909 a large “South American Number”. In their introduction they announced that “The leading journalist of Brazil, DR. J. C. RODRIGUES, Editor of the Jornal do Comercio, of Rio de Janeiro, has written an admirable letter to precede the Brazilian articles. DR. RODRIGUES is one of the most independent and fearless writers of Brazil.” Rodrigues edited the Jornal do Comercio until 1915, when he was over seventy. The Christian Science Monitor marked his retirement with a 600 word article.

Rodrigues was a noted collector of books on colonial Brazil and in 1907 published Bibliotheca Brasiliense, a two volume annotated catalogue so useful that it was reprinted sixty years later, and again a generation on. Many of his books are now in the National Library of Brazil; some were bought from him by a benefactor so that he could endow a children's hospital in Rio.

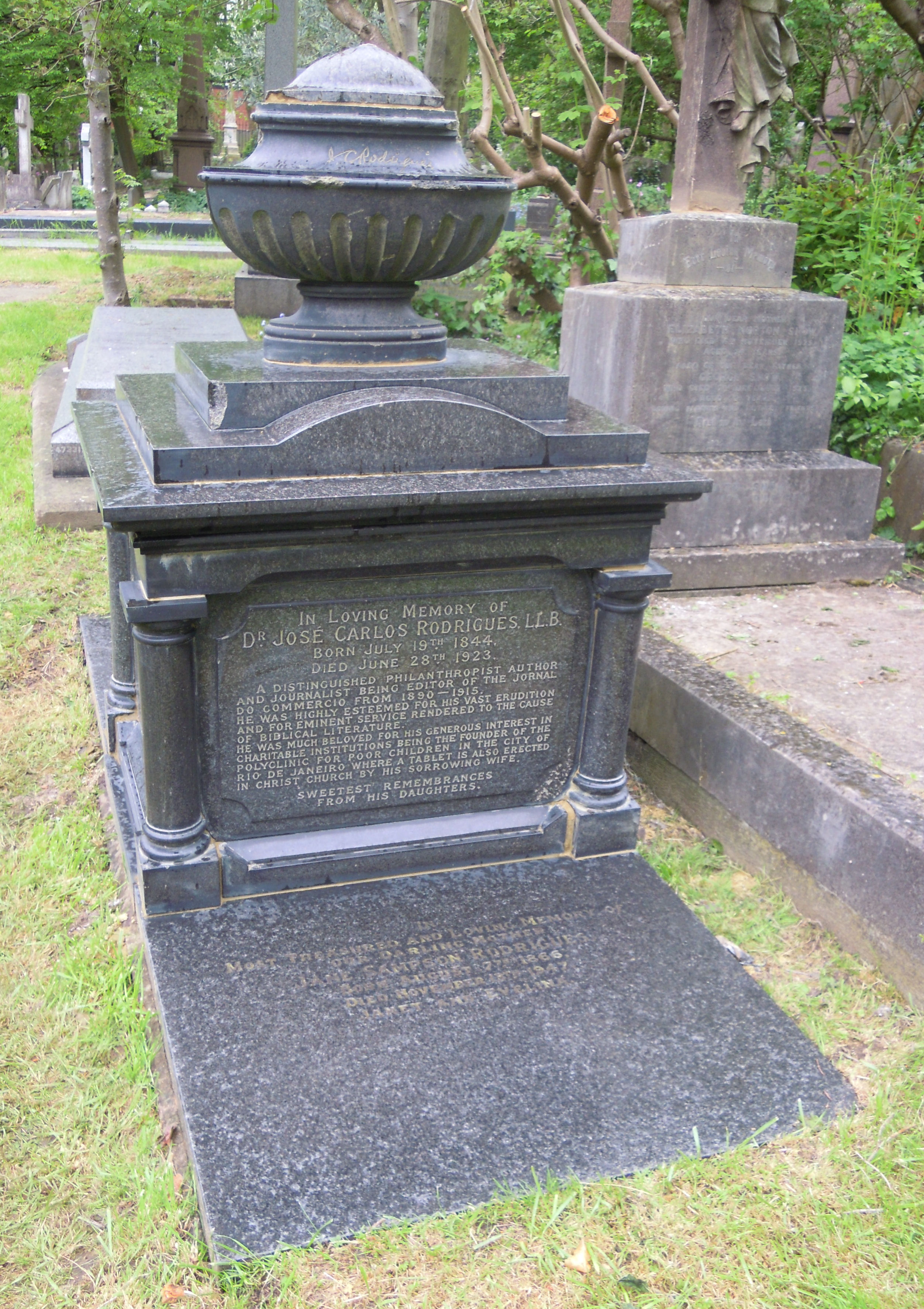
Rodrigues' grave in Highgate Cemetery

All through his life, he kept the scholarly interest in religion and the practical faith which he had acquired as a young man, and his old age was dedicated especially to his religious writings. His first was a study of non-Catholic religions in Brazil between 1500 and 1900, which soon went into a second edition. In 1912 he published a monograph on the Resurrection of Jesus; in 1918 Considerações Geraes sobre a Biblia –“general considerations about the Bible”; and in 1921 a magisterial two volume study of the Old Testament. Not all his writings in old age were religious. He also used the resources of the Jornal do Comercio to produce in 1918 a collection of U.S. President Woodrow Wilson’s speeches on the Great War, and in 1921 143 pages of “notes” on the subject of contraband goods in wartime.

He died in Paris in 1923, where his English wife, Jane Sampson, had lived much of her life, and where his nephew João Baptista Lopes was the Brazilian Consul-General. He was buried in Highgate Cemetery in London. Both his daughters married Englishmen: the elder, Janet, married Sir William Garthwaite; the younger, Evelina, married David Hawes, the managing director of Frederick Sage & Company, shopfitters.
