= Dulce Damasceno de Brito =

Brazilian film journalist

- Born: 1926; Casa Branca, São Paulo state, Brazil
- Died: 9 November 2008 (aged 81–82); São Paulo, Brazil
- Occupation: Journalist
- Known for: Her columns in Brazilian media about Hollywood
- Notable work: The ABC of Carmen Miranda; Memories of Hollywood

Dulce Damasceno de Brito (1926 – 9 November 2008) was a Brazilian journalist specializing in the cinema and, in the 1950s and 1960s, was the first Brazilian woman to be a Hollywood correspondent. She became known for her friendship with the Brazilian actress Carmen Miranda, and for interviewing many celebrities of the time.

== Early life ==
Dulce Damasceno de Brito was born in 1926 in Casa Branca in Brazil's São Paulo state. Even as a child, she was interested in the film world. At the age of 17, and already registered as a journalist, she bought a defunct magazine, registering it in her brother's name because she was still a minor. The magazine was short-lived, but it opened the doors to her future success.

Damasceno de Brito taught herself English. In 1952, she went to Hollywood, hired as a correspondent for the media company, Diários Associados, and for O Cruzeiro magazine, and lived there for 16 years. Her role was more that of a gossip columnist than a film critic. After a first visit to Los Angeles, Damasceno de Brito returned to Brazil in 1955 to marry her boyfriend. They had two children, with her husband staying at home in Hollywood to look after them.

== Career ==
She became friendly with the Brazilian actress Carmen Miranda and, through her, met many other stars of the era, becoming particularly well-known for interviewing her neighbour, Marlon Brando, on three occasions, although he normally refused to do interviews. At that time interviews were usually conducted without tape recorders and journalists were required by their bosses to have their photo taken with the actor being interviewed, to prove the interview took place. Also, at that time journalists had easy access to the movie studios and Damasceno de Brito found it easy to meet and befriend many of the Hollywood celebrities. Among those she interviewed were Marilyn Monroe, Clark Gable, Elizabeth Taylor, Rock Hudson, Doris Day, Cary Grant, Marlene Dietrich, James Stewart, Charlton Heston, Audrey Hepburn, John Wayne, Jane Wyman, Sophia Loren, James Dean, Barbara Stanwyck, Gregory Peck, Walt Disney, Grace Kelly, and Elvis Presley, as well as directors such as Robert Aldrich, Cecil B. de Mille, Michael Curtiz, Orson Welles and Billy Wilder.

== Critical reception ==
Her columns were very popular in Brazil and her work was reproduced in 20 Brazilian newspapers. Nevertheless, among the elite she was often criticised for producing work that was devoid of a critical sense and too pro-American.

== Publications ==
Damasceno de Brito authored several books:

- 1968. Hollywood, nua e crua (Hollywood Naked and Raw), Publisher: O Cruzeiro. A book that considers the loneliness of the screen idols.
- 1986. O ABC de Carmen Miranda, Publisher: Companhia e Nacional
- 1992. Hollywood, nua e crua – Part 2, Publisher: Best Seller
- 2008. Lembranças de Hollywood (Memories of Hollywood), Publisher: Imprensa Oficial do Estado de São Paulo. Written portraits of 140 Hollywood personalities with "their quirks and idiosyncrasies, the sexuality of one and the other, the decadence of many."

== Death ==
Dulce Damasceno de Brito died in São Paulo on 9 November 2008 of heart problems. She was writing newspaper columns until her death, working for SET Magazine. Interviewed at the age of 80, she stated that her one regret was that she had not interviewed more film directors, because her readers did not ask for it, being more interested in intimate details and gossip about the actors.
