= Sebastião Nery =

Brazilian writer and journalist (1932–2024)

- Born: March 8, 1932; Jaguaquara, Bahia, Brazil
- Died: September 23, 2024 (aged 92)
- Occupation: Journalist

Sebastião Nery (March 8, 1932 – September 23, 2024) was a Brazilian writer and journalist.

== Early life and education ==
Nery was born in Jaguaquara, in the state of Bahia, on March 8, 1932. From 1942 to 1950 he studied at the Seminary of Amargosa, Bahia, and at the Central Seminary of Bahia, in Salvador. Having moved to Belo Horizonte, he graduated in philosophy at the University of Minas Gerais in 1954, and began a course in juridical and social sciences, which he completed in 1958 at the Law School in Bahia.

== Writing career ==
Nery worked as a reporter for O Diário, a morning newspaper linked to the Archdiocese of Belo Horizonte; and for various other publications in the late 1950s before founding the weekly newspaper Jornal da Semana in 1959. He continued to write and edit for a range of print and television news outlets through the sixties and seventies.

== Political career ==
In November 1982 he took his place in the Chamber of Deputies in February 1983. He was a presidential candidate for Fernando Collor de Mello in 1989. He was then appointed cultural attaché in Rome, 1990–1991, and in Paris, 1993.

== Death ==
Nery died on September 23, 2024, at the age of 92.

== Published works ==
- Sepulcro caiado: o verdadeiro Juraci, 1962
- Folclore político v. l, 1973
- Socialismo com liberdade, 1974
- 16 derrotas que abalaram o Brasil, 1974
- Portugal, um salto no escuro, 1975
- Folclore político v. 2, 1976
- Folclore político v. 3, 1978
- Pais e padrastos da pátria, 1980
- Folclore político v. 4, 1982
- Sibéria, Nicarágua, El Salvador e outros mundos, 1982
- Crime e castigo da divida externa, 1985
- A história da vitória: porque Collor ganhou, 1990
- A eleição da reeleição, 1999
- Grandes pecados da imprensa, 2000
- Folclore político - 1950 histórias, 2002
- A Nuvem, 50 anos de Historia do Brasil, 2009
- Ninguém Me Contou Eu Vi - De Getúlio a Dilma, 2014
