= Cantagalo, Rio de Janeiro =

Cantagalo
- Municipality
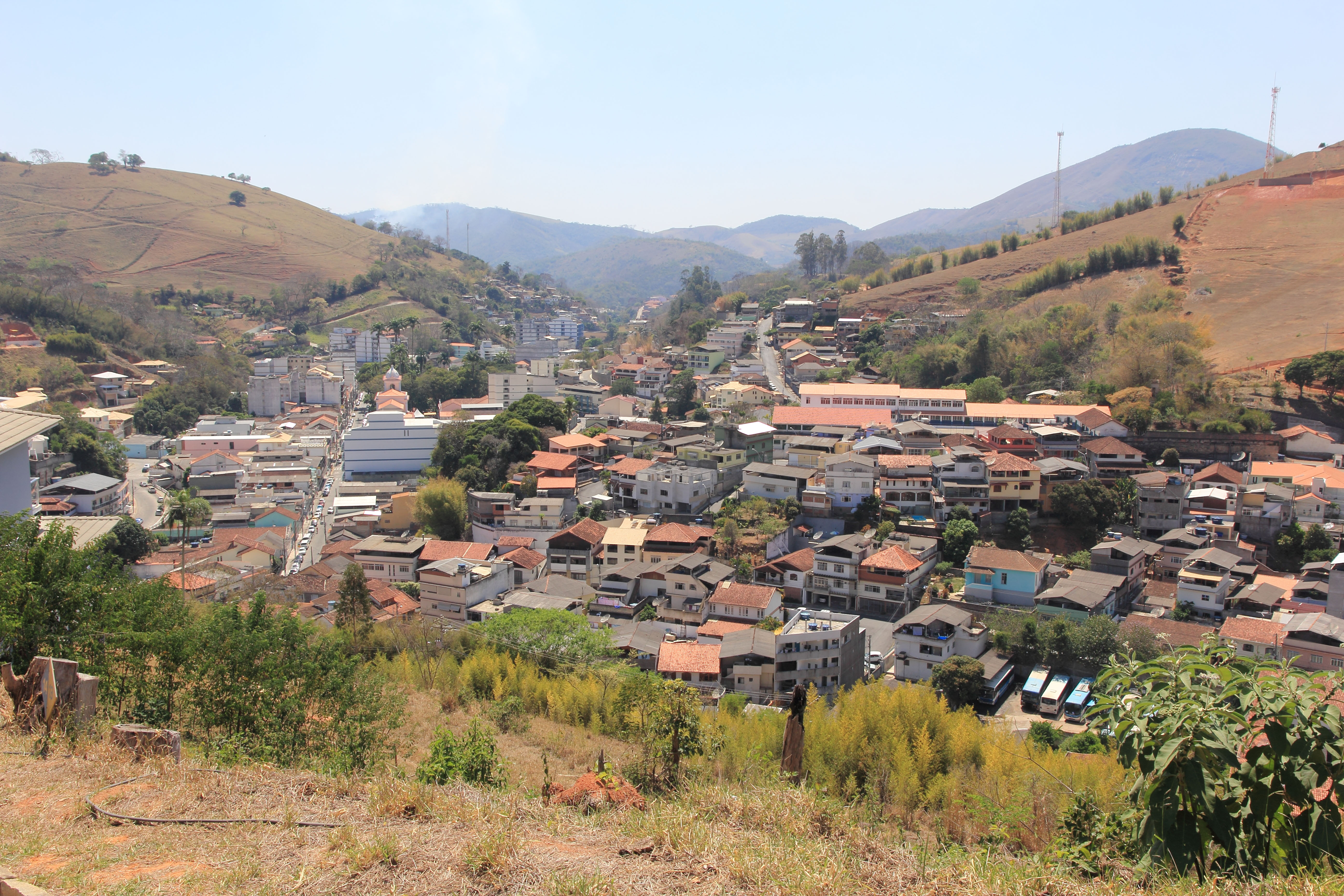

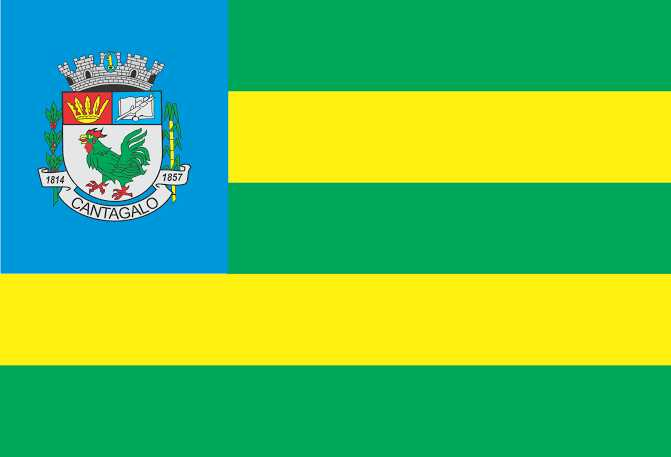
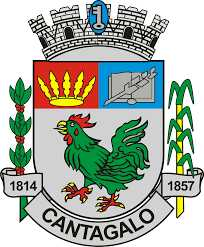
- Flag Coat of arms

- Location in Rio de Janeiro state

- Location in Brazil
- Coordinates: 21°58′51″S 42°22′4″W
- Country: Brazil
- Region: Southeast
- State: Rio de Janeiro

Area
  - Total: 749 km^{2} (289 sq mi)

Population (2020)
  - Total: 20,168
  - Density: 26.9/km^{2} (69.7/sq mi)
- Time zone: UTC-03:00 (BRT)
  - Summer (DST): UTC-02:00 (BRST)

Cantagalo (Portuguese pronunciation: [ˌkɐ̃tɐˈɡalu]), formerly spelled Cantagallo, is a city located in the east-central area of Rio de Janeiro State, Brazil. The population is 20,168 (2020 est.) in an area of 749 km^{2}. Its elevation is 391 m (1,283 ft).

== History ==
Colonization of Cantagalo began in 1755, when Portuguese nobleman Manoel Henriques, Duke of Terso and a clandestine gold miner, left the state of Minas Gerais in search of unexplored riches. Henriques and his group erected a settlement on a small tributary of the Parahyba approximately 80 miles (129 km) northwest of Rio and began exploring along the local rivers. It was originally known as Sertões de Macacu after the nearby Macacu River.

By 1784, the settlement had grown to accommodate approximately 200 houses. This growth caught the attention of the Portuguese rulers of Brazil, who had a monopoly over gold exploration in the colony. By order of the Viceroy Luiz de Vasconcelos e Souza, several expeditions were sent in search of Henriques and his group. The town's current name (Portuguese for "rooster crow") was inspired by the circumstances of his capture. A troop was about to return to their camp after a day of searching in vain around the woods, when a soldier heard the crowing of a rooster nearby and decided to further explore the area. One of Henriques's men was found in a clearing in the woods and, in exchange for his release, revealed the whereabouts of the rest of the group. Henriques was deported to Africa in dishonour.

By 1786, the settlement's name had been officially changed from Sertões de Macacu to Cantagalo. In 1814, Cantagalo was officially recognized by Emperor Pedro I as a municipality and in October 1857, was officially elevated to the category of city. By the mid-19th century, the area's gold was played out and the settlement came to depend on agriculture. Corn, coffee, and sugarcane plantations covered several acres of highly fertile land.

Before the First World War, Cantagallo was considered a rich fruit- and coffee-producing district and was connected to Rio via a 100-mile-long eponymous railway.

Nowadays, the city's economic activities still revolve around agriculture, with the exploration of granite and calcareous rock for the cement industry also playing a strong role. Some of the largest cement manufacturers in Brazil have facilities in Cantagalo.

== Notable residents ==
Financial journalist Jose Carlos Rodrigues was the son of a coffee planter of Cantagallo, born here in 1844. Writer Euclides da Cunha was born here on January 15, 1886; a city district is named Euclidelândia in his honour.
