= Cristiana Lôbo =

Brazilian journalist (1957–2021)

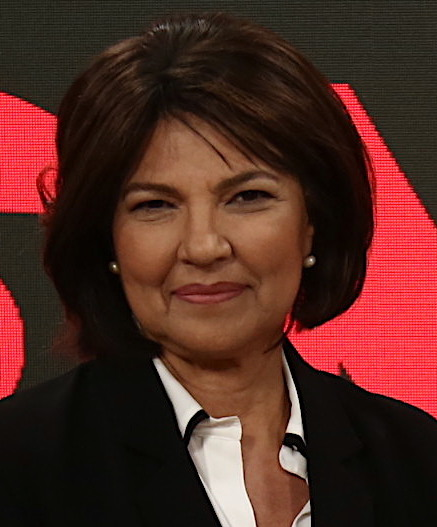
- Lôbo in 2018
- Born: August 18, 1957; Goiânia, Brazil
- Died: November 11, 2021 (aged 64); São Paulo, Brazil
- Education: Federal University of Goiás
- Occupation: Journalist

Cristiana dos Santos Mendes Lôbo (August 18, 1957 — November 11, 2021) was a Brazilian journalist who worked for GloboNews.

== Career ==
Lôbo was born in Goiânia, and studied Social Communication at the Federal University of Goiás (UFG). She entered the profession writing sporadically for Folha de Goiás, a local newspaper in Goiânia. In 1978, she was hired as an intern for the policy editor. A year later, she went to the O Globo branch in Brasília.

Still in the country's capital, Lôbo was a sector reporter for several ministries for two years. The experience was worth a detailed view of each folder. The next challenge was to cover the Palácio do Planalto.

In 1984, came a new career path: the National Congress of Brazil. The journalist took the opportunity to get to know up close and in depth the work of each deputy. In 1986, Lôbo became Tereza Cruvinel's assistant in the Panorama Political column of O Globo.

In 1992, it was time to work with Ricardo Boechat. In the same year, she took up a column in O Estado de S. Paulo, where she stayed until 1998.

Between 1997 and 2021, she was a political commentator for the newspaper das 10, for the Globonews pay channel, where she also hosted the program Fatos e Versões. She was a commentator on Jornal das Dez and Globonews em Pauta, on GloboNews.

== Death ==
Lôbo died in São Paulo, on November 11, 2021, of multiple myeloma (for which she had been under treatment for several years), aggravated by pneumonia. Lôbo was hospitalized at Albert Einstein Hospital, in São Paulo.

The president of the Brazilian Supreme Court, minister Luiz Fux, opened the session with a tribute to the journalist: "Everyone will remember that she covered the acts of this Court and covered Brazilian politics with great excellence, always with great distinction, with zeal, with information."

The president of the Senate, Rodrigo Pacheco, from the PSD, also stated: “She was always very present in the coverage of politics, with a lot of professionalism, a lot of politeness in her dealings. Therefore, a great loss for journalism and for Brazil.”

The president of the Superior Electoral Court, minister Luís Roberto Barroso, too lamented the death of Lôbo in the session. "An extremely serious, courageous, independent, always elegant journalist. And, therefore, on my behalf and, I am sure, on behalf of the members of the Superior Electoral Court, we would like to send our message of solidarity to the whole family, to colleagues, to the widower, Murilo Lôbo. And we will all remember the performance of a great professional who honored Brazilian independent journalism,” Barroso said.

The president of the Central Bank, Roberto Campos Neto, also released a note of regret. “Respected professional with a long career in the Brazilian press, Lôbo has inspired generations to inform her readers and viewers seriously and competently about the country's politics and economy. The president conveys his condolences and sympathizes with family and friends in this moment of pain”, he said.

Lôbo's death was commented on by colleagues live on GloboNews. Leilane Neubarth was moved and said that “it is very difficult to make a newspaper on this day, but we will continue in her honor. I learned a lot from her as a journalist and as a human being”.

== Personal life ==
Cristiana Lôbo was married to Sebastião Murilo Umbelino Lôbo, the couple has two children: Bárbara Mendes Lôbo, a lawyer, and Gustavo Mendes Lobo, also an economist.

Lôbo husband, Sebastião was director of cooperation and development in Institute of Applied Economic Research.
