= A Rosa do Povo =

A Rosa do Povo (The People's Rose) is a book of modernist poetry written by the Brazilian writer and poet Carlos Drummond de Andrade, between the years of 1943 and 1945. It is the most extensive work of the author, being composed of 55 poems, and considered the first mature work and extensive social expression of lyricism and modernism in Brazil. The work is considered by some as a translation and interpretation of the living time of the author, reflecting not only the individual author at the age and time in which he lived in, but as a collective of the people in Brazilian Society.

== Historical Context ==
'A Rosa do Povo had been written during the Second World War, in a time where Nazi Germany had been losing battles and retreating from the Eastern Front due to the increasing advance of Russian Troops, foreshadowing the eventual Surrender of Nazi Germany and the end and Aftermath of World War II. Meanwhile, in Brazil Getúlio Vargas had established the new Estado Novo (Brazil) government, though economically innovating, had been losing popular support and inspired the author to take in different approaches and views toward Brazilian Life and Society.
