= The Crossing of the Red Land =

2007 novel by Lucius de Mello - Nova edição em 2017 Companhia Editora Nacional

The Crossing of the Red Land - the saga of Jewish refugees in Brazil
- First edition
- Author: Lucius de Mello - Doutor em Letras Universidade de São Paulo/ Sorbonne - Paris
- Original title: A Travessia da Terra Vermelha – uma saga dos refugiados judeus no Brasil
- Cover artist: Guilherme Xavier, Célio Costa // Marcela Badolatto.
- Language: Portuguese
- Genre: Historical novel
- Publisher: Editora Novo Século // Companhia Editora Nacional
- Publication date: 2007 // 2017
- Publication place: Brazil
- Media type: Print
- ISBN: 978-85-7679-108-9
- OCLC: 180701914
- LC Class: F2659.J5 M44 2007

The Crossing of the Red Land - the saga of Jewish refugees in Brazil (orig. title in Portuguese: A Travessia da Terra Vermelha – uma saga dos refugiados judeus no Brasil), is a 2007 novel by Brazilian author Lucius de Mello.

This historical novel details the lives of German Jewish refugees in the 1930s and 1940s, who found themselves living in the wilderness of Paraná, in Southern Brazil, while escaping Hitler's regime.

To compose this romance, the author interviewed direct descendants of these pioneers, in Brazil and in Germany.
