= Chu Ming Silveira =

Chinese Brazilian architect and designer

- Born: Chu Ming; April 4, 1939; Shanghai, China
- Died: June 18, 1997 (aged 58); São Paulo, Brazil
- Education: Mackenzie Presbyterian University (1964)
- Known for: Design of the Orelhão
- Spouse: Clóvis Silveira (m. 1968)
- Children: 2

Chu Ming Silveira (April 4, 1941 – June 18, 1997) was a Chinese Brazilian architect and designer. She is known as the creator of the Orelhão telephone booth.

== Early life and education ==
Born in Shanghai, China on April 4, 1941, Chu Ming Silveira was the second of four children to civil engineer, Chu Chen, and his wife, Shui Young Queen. Following the Chinese Civil War in 1949, Silveira and her family fled to Hong Kong, escaping persecution. Shortly after, the family left Hong Kong in hopes of reaching the United States. However, the family ultimately settled in São Paulo, Brazil, in Bairro Pinheiros. Silveira graduated receiving a master's degree in architecture. Soon after, she married engineer, Clóvis Silveira and had two children. Chu Ming Silveira's son is Alan Chu. In São Paulo, Silveira pursued her education in architecture at Mackenzie University, where she graduated in 1964. Her early experiences in China and the challenges her family faced likely shaped her resilient and innovative spirit, which she would later channel into her work as an architect and designer in Brazil (Observer Voice, 2024; 99% Invisible, 2024)

== Career ==
Only one year after she received her degree, Silveira opened her own architecture firm, focusing primarily on building projects. In the following year, she began working at the Brazilian Telephone Company in São Paulo. Initially, she was responsible for overlooking and coordinating the development of telephone central and service station projects. In 1968, she led the Project Department, where she designed public telephone protectors Chu I and Chu II. Later on, she continued her career in architecture and design at São Paulo City Hall, developing preliminary designs for newspaper and flower stands for the city. From 1973 to 1978, Silveira worked at Montreal Engineering S.A. and Serete S.A. Engineering. Her career ended with her work on residential projects on the São Paulo coast.

== Orelhão public telephone booths ==
During Silveira's time as the Project Department lead, she was faced with creating an improved solution for Brazil's new public telephones. Prior to this, few Brazilian households could afford to own a telephone and majority of the population took phone calls on telephones placed in local business, such as bars and bakeries. However, the introduction of public telephones in Brazilian cities caused a number of issues to arise. Initially, these telephones were encased in cylindrical cabins, which were frequently vandalized, expensive to make and maintain, and took up too much of the already limited sidewalk space. Further, there was the typical challenge with public telephones in urban spaces: being able to be heard by and hear the other person on the line. Ultimately, Silveira was tasked with creating an inexpensive, damage and weather resistant, visually pleasing, and functional solution.

With the preceding pain points in mind and inspired by Arne Jacobsen's "Egg Chair," Silveira designed Chu I and Chu II: the functional and aesthetic egg-shaped public telephone booths. Chu I, or more commonly referred to as the Orelhinha ("little ear"), was made of orange acrylic and was installed in smaller, indoor spaces, such as shops or public offices. On the other hand, Chu II, or more affectionately known as Orelhão ("big ear"), was made of orange and blue fiber glass to resist outdoor weather conditions and extreme temperatures. Both were fixed on small posts. Some were transparent to visually expand the space. Visually, Silveira's design closely resembled the organic shape of an egg, encasing both the telephone at its center and the user, allowing for optimal acoustics and privacy. With this design, Silveira successfully created an inexpensive solution that minimized the sidewalk space occupied by phone booths and withstood external damage, while still reducing external noise and optimizing the sound quality for users. Her clever design also visually fit with the urban spaces.

Rio de Janeiro and São Paulo installed their first booths in January 1971 and they quickly became popular. Soon enough, thousands of Orelhões were rolled out across Brazil. Citizens quickly developed nicknames for the egg-shaped booth, including "tulip" and "astronaut helmet." In March 1972, the Brazilian Telephonic Company saw a 12 percent increase in the average daily number of phone calls made on public phones are the implementation of the Orelhões. By 1973, the booths began making their way to other countries, with the first ones being exported to Mozambique, Africa. There were more than 52,000 Orelhões in Brazil and more adaptations can be found across Latin America, Africa, and China. Despite the success of Silveira's Orelhões, they were disabled in 2016 and since January 2026, although still have some 38000 installed, they would be no longer in use due to the rise of mobile phones. However, it still remained as an iconic symbol of Brazil. Prior to its decline, the Orelhão was also part of a number of art and design exhibitions.

== Legacy ==
Google celebrated Silveira's 76th birthday with a Google Doodle by Pedro Vergani on April 4, 2017.
