= Cristóvão de Aguiar =

Portuguese writer (1940–2021)

Luís Cristóvão Dias de Aguiar (8 September 1940 – 5 October 2021), commonly known as Cristóvão de Aguiar, was a Portuguese writer.

His most significant work is the novel trilogy "Raiz Comovida" (1979–1981), 'Marilha', narrative sequence (two novels: Grito em Chamas e Ciclone de Setembro", Passenger in Transit; "Diaries (Relação de Bordo, I, II, III," "A Tabuada do Tempo"; short stories: "Trasfega", "Cães Letrados", "A descoberta da cidade e outras histórias"; Poetry: "Mãos Vazias"; "O pão da Palavra", "Sonetos de Amor Ilhéu"; Essays: "No Segundo Centenário da Reforma Pombalina"; "Com Paulo Quintela À Mesa da Tertúlia", "Charlas Sobre a Língua Portuguesa"; "Miguel Torga, o Lavrador das Letras" "Emigração e outros temas Ilhéus"; Translations: "Adam Smith, the Wealth of Nations"; "Noble Architecture" (from Portuguese into English).
