= Cristóvão (footballer) =

Portuguese footballer (born 1965)

Personal information
- Full name: Jorge Manuel Guerreiro Cristóvão
- Date of birth: 5 June 1965 (age 61)
- Place of birth: Lisbon, Portugal
- Height: 1.71 m (5 ft 7 in)
- Position: Midfielder

Youth career
- –1983: Benfica

Senior career*
Years	Team	Apps	(Gls)
1983–1984	União Almeirim		
1984–1985	Torreense		
1985–1987	Atlético		
1987–1988	Louletano		
1988–1989	Olhanense		
1989–1991	Famalicão		
1991–1992	Estrela da Amadora		
1992–1994	Louletano		
1994–1999	Leça		
1999–2001	Olivais e Moscavide		

International career
	Portugal U16	15	(2)
	Portugal U18	2	(0)
- * Club domestic league appearances and goals

Jorge Manuel Guerreiro Cristóvão (born 5 June 1965) is a retired Portuguese football midfielder.
