= SET Magazine =

American sports magazine

SET (Sports and Entertainment Today) Magazine is a sports and entertainment magazine founded by the publisher Danisha Rolle. The magazine was launched in September 2008. It is published quarterly and is based in West Palm Beach, Florida, USA.

The magazine targets women and provides an in-depth look behind the scenes of famous athletes and celebrities, showcasing their families, vacations and lifestyle. The magazine offers vivid photographs and interviews with celebrities. SET showcases celebrity athletes, including Will Demps and Jevon Kearse, on its front cover.
