= Ismael Nery =

Brazilian artist (1900–1934)

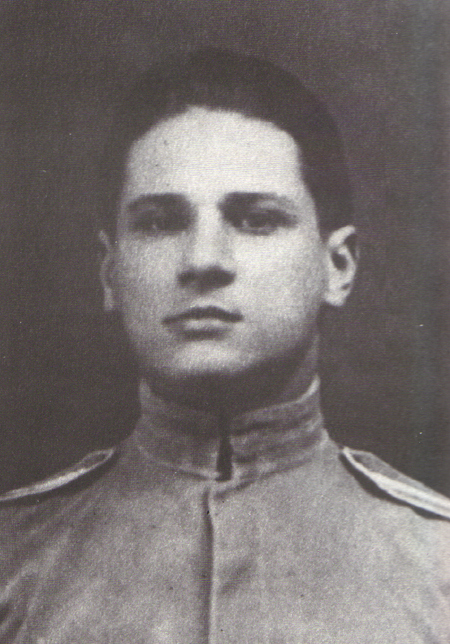
Photograph of Nery

Ismael Nery (October 9, 1900 – April 6, 1934) was a Brazilian artist. His iconic work is Autorretrato, 1927 (Autorretrato Rio/Paris), a surrealist painting commonly compared to the Green Violinist of Marc Chagall and now in São Paulo Museum of Art.

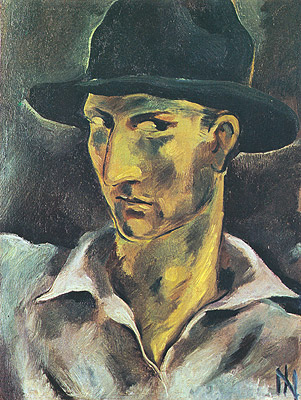
Ismael Nery, self-portrait

== Life ==
Nery was born in 1900 in Belém, Pará, of Dutch, Native-Brazilian, and African ancestry. His family settled in 1909 in Rio de Janeiro. In 1915, he began his studies at the Escola Nacional de Belas Artes (National School of Fine Arts). He traveled to Europe in 1920, and attended the Académie Julian in Paris. Back in Brazil, he worked in the architecture section of the National Heritage service at the Ministry of Finance, where he became friends with the poet Murilo Mendes. Nery created numerous paintings, wrote many poems and also helped design Brazil's National Patrimony of the Treasury department. In 1922, he married a poet, Adalgisa Nery. In this period, he produced works with an expressionist tendency.

His favorite themes are always linked to the human figure: portraits, self-portraits and nudes. He is not interested in national, indigenous and Afro-Brazilian themes. It diversifies the techniques used. He is also a scenographer. In 1929, he had two solo exhibitions, in Belém and Rio de Janeiro. The welcome disappoints him. He also participates in a group exhibition of Brazilian painting in New York.

== Sickness and death ==
That same year 1929, after a trip to Argentina and Uruguay, a diagnosis revealed that he was infected with tuberculosis. He lived in a sanatorium for two years to recover. He then resumed exhibiting and participated in a few shows, such as the Salão Revolucionário in Rio de Janeiro in 1931 and the Exposição de Arte Moderna da SPAM in São Paulo in 1933. In 1933, the disease returned, with irreversible effects. He died in 1934, at the age of thirty-three in Rio de Janeiro while his fame was still only nascent beyond a small circle of connoisseurs. He is buried dressed in Franciscan garb, in a homage of the monks to his ardent Catholic faith.

== Legacy ==
In 1959, Adalgisa Nery published an autobiographical novel, A Imaginária, which became a bestseller. The book relates in particular the common years with Ismael Nery. Adalgisa Nery describes the fascination she initially felt for her husband, but also their agitated relationship, the internal torments of Ismael Nery, and her violence in everyday life.

Ismael Nery's work was forgotten by the public and critics until the 1960s, when his name was inscribed on the 8th São Paulo Art Biennial, In the room devoted to surrealism and fantastic art. His works were also exhibited in the 10th Biennial. In 1966 in Rio de Janeiro, and in 1984, at the Museum of Contemporary Art of the University of São Paulo (Ismael Nery Retrospective - 50 years later), two retrospectives of his creations were presented.

== Gallery ==
Ismael Nery's works

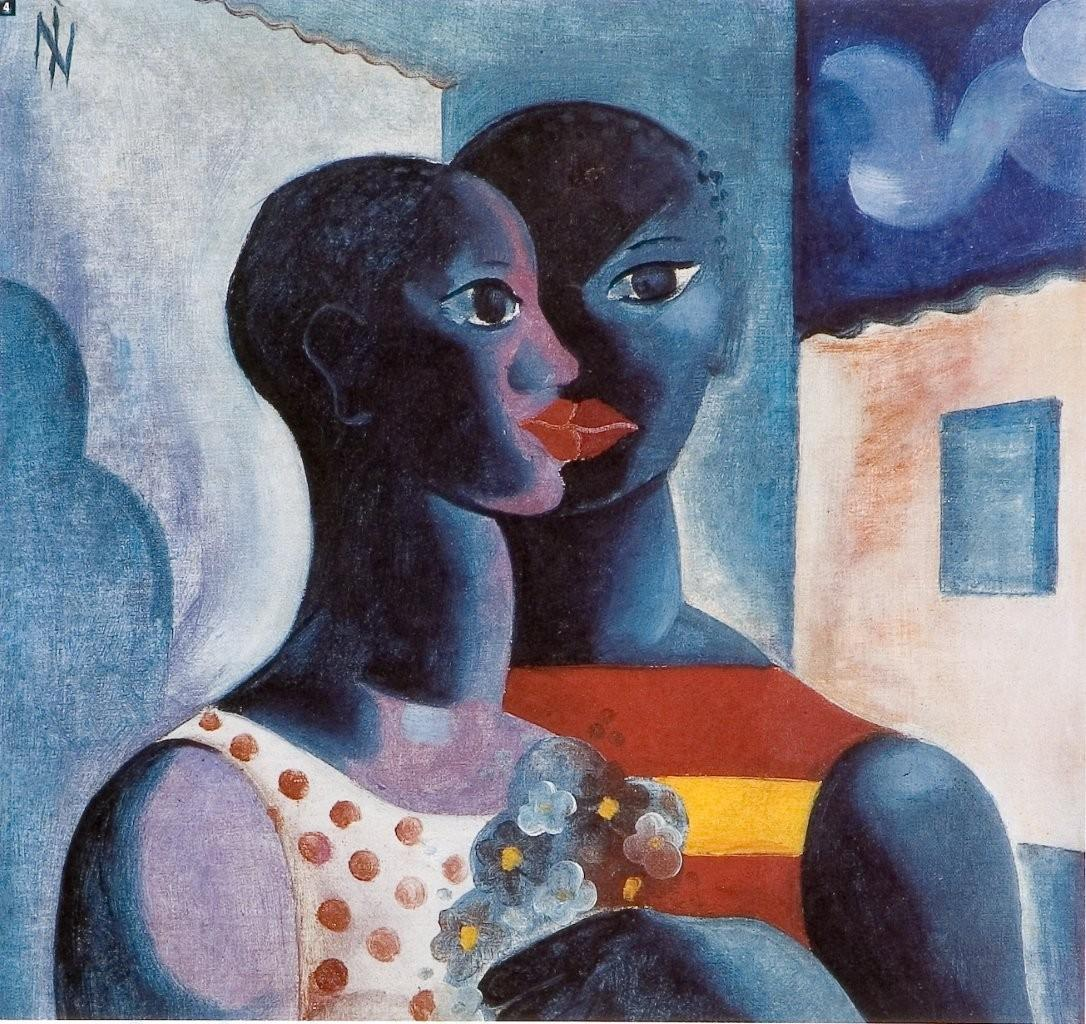
Ismael Nery - Namorados, circa 1927

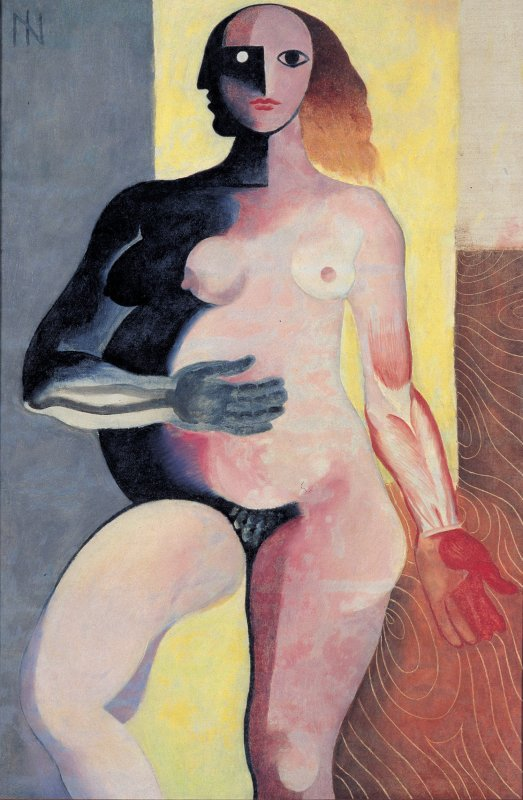
Figura, 1927 (Museu de Arte Contemporânea da Universidade de São Paulo)

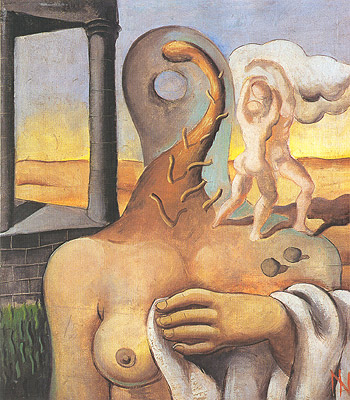
Desejo de Amor

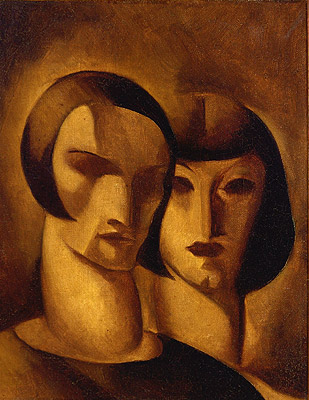
Selfportrait with Adalgisa

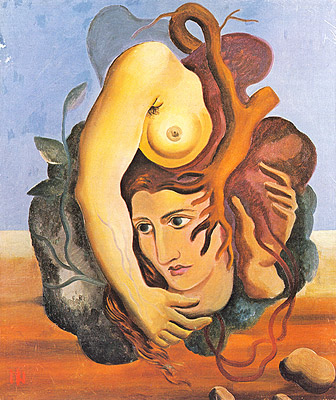
Composition

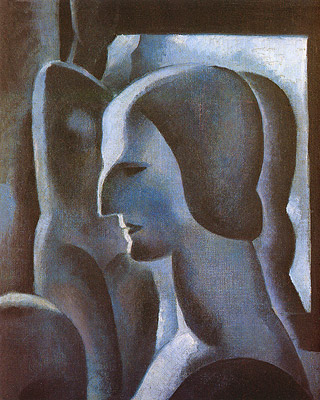
Adalgisa

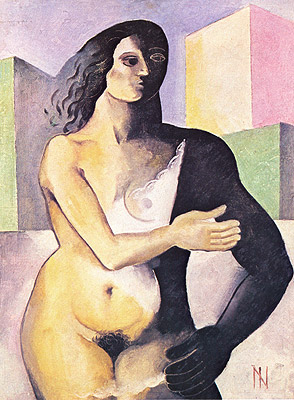
Figura com cubos, n.d.

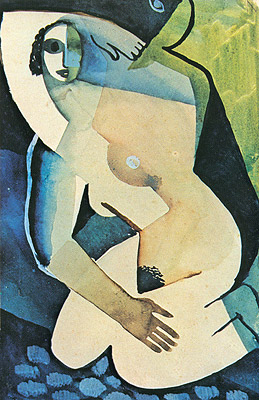
Mulher Nua Ajoelhada, ca. 1930

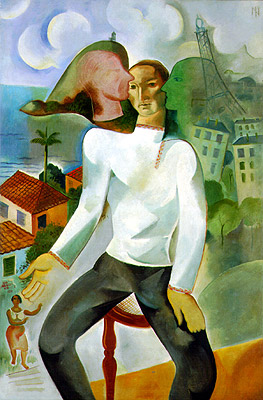
Auto-retrato, 1927

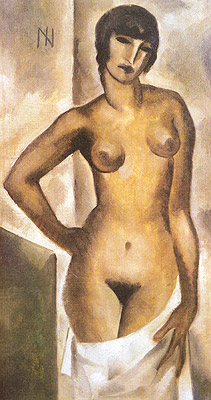
Nu feminino, 1925

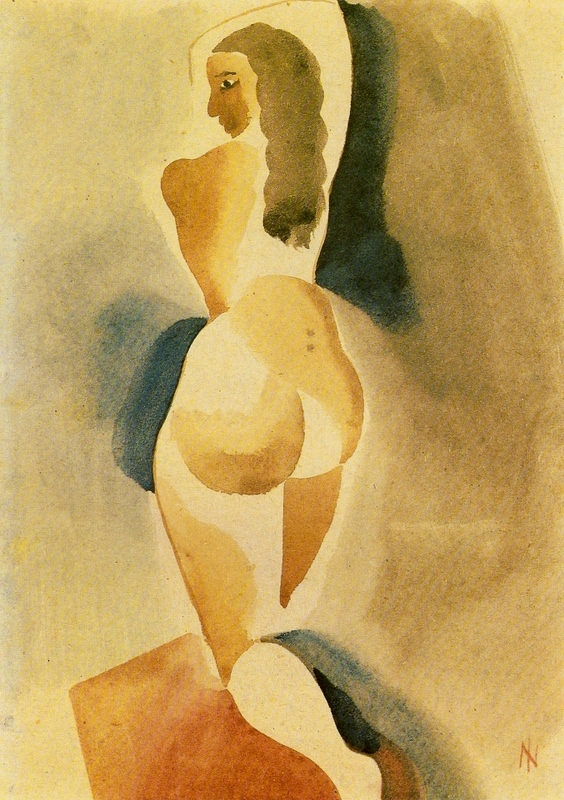
Nu, n.d.
