= Lucius de Mello =

Brazilian writer and journalist

Lucius de Mello is a Brazilian writer and journalist. PhD student in letters at the University of São Paulo and Sorbonne University in Paris - through the CAPES / PRINT program. As a reporter, he worked for 14 years for television network Rede Globo. Lucius de Mello is also a researcher at LEER, the Laboratory of Ethnicity, Racism and Discrimination Studies at the University of São Paulo (USP), Brazil. Master's degree in Hebrew Literature and Culture also in São Paulo University.

== Bibliography ==
- Um violino para os gatos (A Violin for the Cats), short stories, 1995
- Eny e o Grande Bordel Brasileiro (Eny and the Great Brazilian Bordello), biography, 2002
- A Travessia da Terra Vermelha – uma saga dos refugiados judeus no Brasil (The Crossing of the Red Land - the saga of Jewish refugees in Brazil), historical novel, 2007
- Mestiços da Casa Velha, romance, 2008, Novo Século editora, São Paulo.
- Dois Irmãos e seus precursores: o mito e a Bíblia na obra de Milton Hatoum, Editora Humanitas, 2014, São Paulo.
- Crônicas do Grande Bordel, ebook - 2015, editora Planeta.
- Eny e o Grande Bordel Brasileiro (Eny and the Great Brazilian Bordello], editora Planeta, 2015.
