= São Cristóvão (disambiguation) =

São Cristóvão is Portuguese for Saint Christopher. It may also refer to:

Places in Brazil

- São Cristóvão, Sergipe
- São Cristóvão do Sul, Santa Catarina
- Imperial de São Cristóvão, Rio de Janeiro

Other

- Paço de São Cristóvão, former imperial palace in Rio de Janeiro
- São Cristóvão de Futebol e Regatas, football club in Rio de Janeiro
