= José-Itamar de Freitas =

Brazilian journalist (1934–2020)

José-Itamar de Freitas (Miracema, August 4, 1934 - Rio de Janeiro, July 1, 2020) was a Brazilian journalist.

== Career ==
Freitas started at Fatos & Fotos, from Bloch Editores, where he won the Esso Prize in 1965. In 1973, already at Rede Globo, he started directing the Fantástico program, in which he stayed until 1991. Freitas also collaborated for Jornal Nacional.

== Death ==
He died at the age of 85, on July 1, 2020, due to complications from COVID-19.
