= Lourival Fontes =

Brazilian journalist and politician (1899–1967)

Lourival Fontes

Lourival Fontes (July 20, 1899 – March 6, 1967) was a Brazilian journalist and politician best known for being the propaganda minister for President Getúlio Vargas between 1934 and 1942. He was born in Riachão do Dantas, Sergipe and married the poet Adalgisa Nery in 1940. He also served as the Ambassador of Brazil to Mexico.
