= Jaguaquara =

Municipality of Bahia, Brazil

Coordinates: 13°32′S 39°58′W

- Municipality
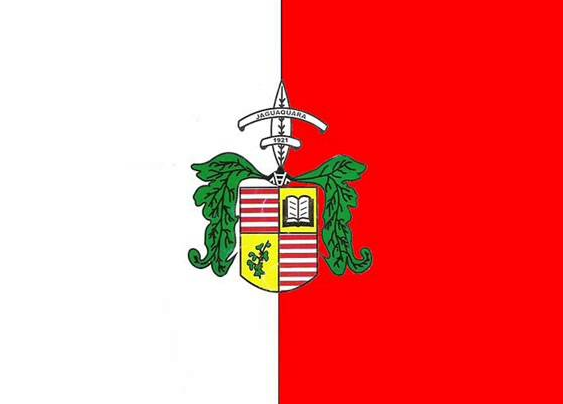
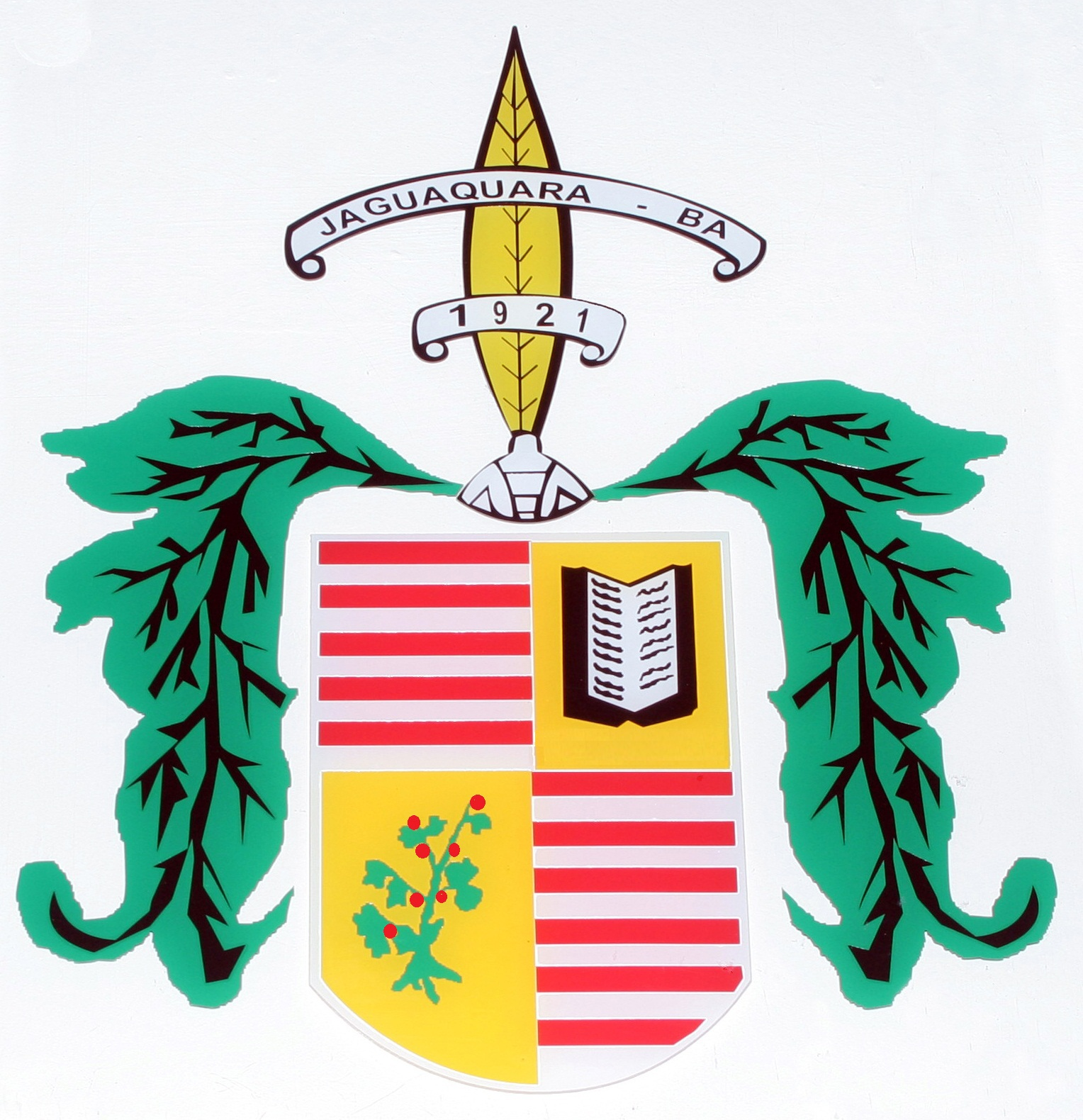
- Flag Coat of arms
- Interactive map of Jaguaquara
- Country: Brazil
- Region: Nordeste
- State: Bahia

Population (2020)
  - Total: 54,673
- Time zone: UTC−3 (BRT)

Jaguaquara is a municipality with a population of 51,019 residents, in the state of Bahia in the North-East region of Brazil.

== See also ==
- List of municipalities in Bahia
