= Leilane Neubarth =

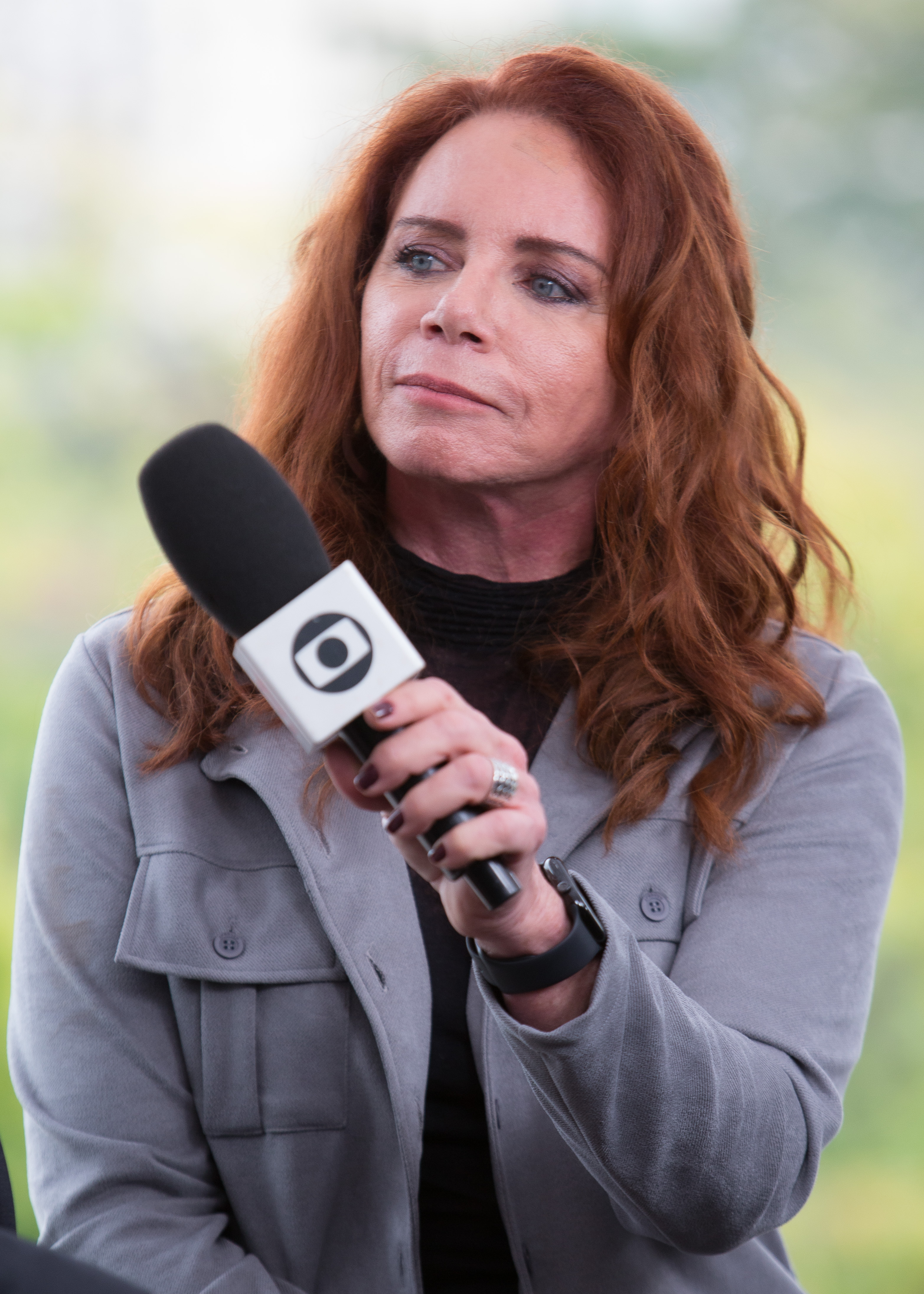
- Neubarth in 2025 during the BRICS Summit in Rio de Janeiro
- Born: Leilane Neubarth Teixeira; November 15, 1958 (age 67); Rio de Janeiro, Brazil
- Education: University of Brasília
- Occupations: Journalist, news presenter, writer
- Years active: 1979–present
- Notable credit(s): Arquivo N Jornal GloboNews; Fantástico (former)

Leilane Neubarth Teixeira (born November 15, 1958) is a Brazilian journalist, news presenter and writer.

== Biography ==
Neubarth was born in Rio de Janeiro, daughter of an Ad Executive father and a speech therapist mother. Her parents moved to Brasília while she was still a child and she grew up there. Leilane made her television career debut in 1979 at Rede Globo as a trainee, while still in university. In 1982, after graduation, Neubarth moved back to Rio de Janeiro, seeking better career opportunities. She achieved a deep interest in news covering. From 1986 until 2017, she was married with the SporTV production designer, Olivio Petit.

During her years, Neubarth was developing a new type of journalism, to fit different sorts of coverage, from documentaries to interviews, daily news programs and music events, such as Rock in Rio. In 1990, she left Globo and joined Rede Manchete, where she hosted a Sunday night show, focused on many issues and sorts of news. A year later, Globo invited her back to present their Sunday night show Fantástico. Years later, following her instinct of daily journalism, Leilane began presenting Bom Dia Brasil with Renato Machado from its studios in Rio de Janeiro. In 1999, she had a participation in the Granada-Dakar Rally as the navigator, which she published her experiences in the book Faróis de Milha, in 2000.

Later, Neubarth moved to GloboNews, the Cable TV channel from Rede Globo, where she currently presents the news at 18:00.

== See also ==
- List of Brazilian journalists
