= Adísia Sá =

Brazilian radio host, television presenter, writer, and journalist

Maria Adísia Barros de Sá (born 7 November 1929, in Cariré) is a Brazilian radio host, television presenter, writer, and journalist. In 2009, the newspaper O Estado de S. Paulo established the Adísia Sá Journalism Cultural Contest in her honour. In 2013, she was awarded the Medal of Abolition by the state of Ceará.
