= Murilo Mendes =

Brazilian modernist poet (1901–1975)

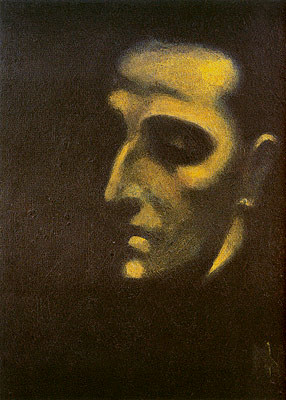
- A portrait of Mendes painted in 1922 by Ismael Nery
- Born: Murilo Monteiro Mendes; May 13, 1901; Juiz de Fora, Minas Gerais, Brazil
- Died: August 13, 1975 (aged 74); Lisbon, Portugal
- Occupation: Poet
- Notable work: Poemas, Bumba-Meu-Poeta

Murilo Monteiro Mendes (May 13, 1901 – August 13, 1975) was a Brazilian Modernist poet, considered to be one of the forerunners of the Surrealist movement in Brazil.

== Biography ==
Mendes was born in Juiz de Fora, in the Brazilian state of Minas Gerais, on May 13, 1901. He subsequently moved to Niterói in order to finish his high school, and settled in Rio de Janeiro afterwards. Mendes alleges that two happenings of his life inspired him to become a poet: the sighting of Halley's Comet in 1910, and a performance of Russian ballet dancer Vaslav Nijinsky he attended in 1917.

Between 1924 and 1929, Mendes published his first poems in the Modernist magazines Antropofagia and Verde. His first poetry book, simply called Poemas, was published in 1930; it won the Graça Aranha Prize. His second poetry book, Bumba-Meu-Poeta, was released shortly afterwards, and in 1933, Mendes published História do Brasil.

Since the 1920s Mendes was very close friends with Modernist painter Ismael Nery; Nery painted a portrait of Mendes in 1922, and also influenced him to convert himself to Roman Catholicism (Mendes was previously an Atheist). Nery died in 1934, leaving Mendes confused and saddened; this, along with his newly found faith, influenced the writing process of his book Tempo e Eternidade, written in conjunction with Jorge de Lima and published in 1935.

Until 1935 he worked as a telegrapher and as a bookkeeper. In 1936 he became a school inspector, and in 1946 he became a scrivener. In 1947 he married Maria da Saudade Cortesão, but they would not have any children.

From 1953 onwards Mendes would travel around Europe, settling in Italy in 1957, where he became a teacher of Brazilian literature in the Sapienza University of Rome, and later in the University of Pisa. Around this time, Mendes' works started to be translated and published in Portugal, Spain and Italy.

Having moved to Portugal, Mendes received the Prémio Internacional de Poesia Etna-Taormina in 1972, and after a short visit to Brazil, he returned to Europe and published his last book, Retratos-Relâmpago, in 1973. Two years later, in 1975, Mendes died in Lisbon.

After his death, Mendes' library of some 2,800 works was donated to the Federal University of Juiz de Fora by his widow. This forms the basis of the collection of the Museu de Arte Murilo Mendes (MAMM), inaugurated in 2005 in Juiz de Fora.

== Works ==
- Poemas (1930)
- Bumba-Meu-Poeta (1930)
- História do Brasil (1933)
- Tempo e Eternidade (1935 — co-written by Jorge de Lima)
- A Poesia em Pânico (1938)
- O Visionário (1941)
- As Metamorfoses (1944)
- O Discípulo de Emaús (1944)
- Mundo-Enigma (1945)
- Poesia-Liberdade (1947)
- Janela do Caos (1948)
- Contemplação de Ouro Preto (1954)
- Tempo Espanhol (1959)
- Poliedro (1962)
- A Idade do Serrote (1968)
- Convergência (1972)
- Retratos-Relâmpago (1973)
