= Euclides da Cunha =

Brazilian journalist, sociologist and engineer

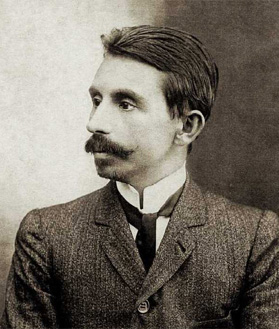
- Born: January 20, 1866 Cantagalo, Rio de Janeiro, Empire of Brazil
- Died: August 15, 1909 (aged 43) Piedade, Rio de Janeiro
- Occupation: Journalist; Sociologist; Engineer
- Genre: Poetry

Euclides da Cunha (Brazilian Portuguese: [ewˈklidʒiz da ˈkũɲɐ], January 20, 1866 – August 15, 1909) was a Brazilian journalist, sociologist and engineer. His most important work is Os Sertões (Rebellion in the Backlands), a non-fictional account of the military expeditions promoted by the Brazilian government against the rebellious village of Canudos, known as the War of Canudos.

This book was a favorite of Robert Lowell, who ranked it above Tolstoy. Jorge Luis Borges also commented on it in his short story "Three Versions of Judas". The book was translated into English by Samuel Putnam and published by the University of Chicago Press in 1944. It remains in print. He was heavily influenced by Naturalism and its Darwinian proponents. Os Sertões characterised the coast of Brazil as a chain of civilisations while the interior remained more primitive. He occupied the 7th chair of the Brazilian Academy of Letters from 1903 until his death in 1909.

He served as inspiration for the character of The Journalist in Mario Vargas Llosa's The War of the End of the World.

== Timeline ==
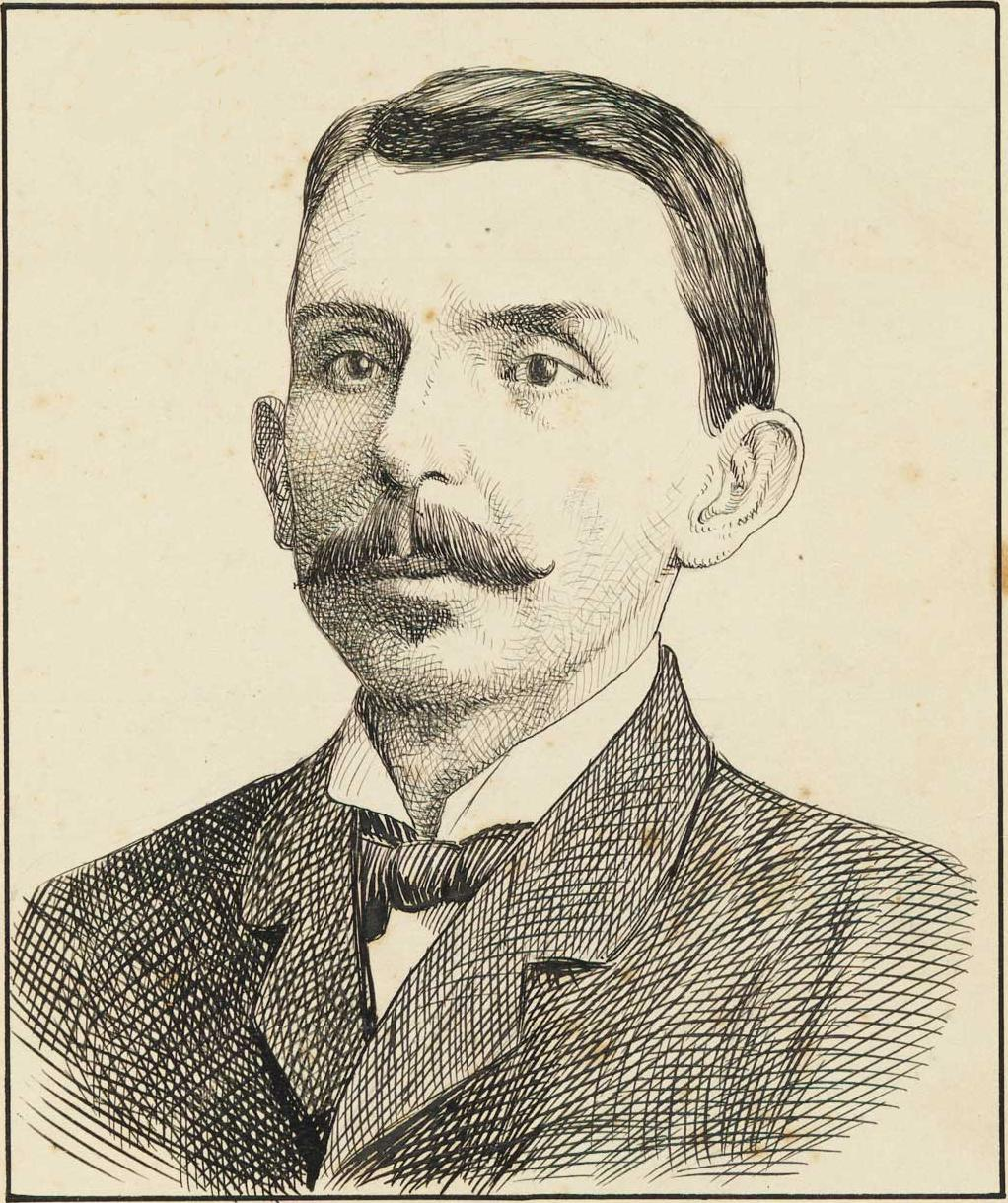
Euclides da Cunha from a publication of F.Briguiet & Cie. (1890s)

Euclides da Cunha was born January 20, 1866, in Cantagalo, Rio de Janeiro, Brazil, where he lived until he was three years old. His grandparents were of Portuguese origin. He attended in 1885 Escola Politécnica, and after he attended Escola Militar da Praia Vermelha, a military school in Rio, beginning in 1886. He was expelled from the military school in 1888, due to his participation in an act of protest during a visit of the Brazilian War Minister, Tomás José Coelho de Almeida, who was a member of the last Conservative cabinet of the Brazilian Empire. He was readmitted to the Escola Militar in 1889. He was admitted to the Brazilian War School (Escola de Guerra) in 1891 . He was discharged from the Army in 1896 in order to dedicate himself to studying civil engineering.

In 1897 he accompanied the Army in the Campanha de Canudos, against a rebellious group of peasants under the leadership of Antonio Conselheiro. Between 7 August and 1 October, he was in the Sertão ("backland"), as war correspondent for the O Estado de S. Paulo newspaper. In 1903 he was elected to the Academia Brasileira de Letras (Brazilian Academy of Letters) and the Instituto Histórico e Geográfico, the Historical and Geographic Institute In 1904, Cunha was employed on a joint Brazilian-Peruvian expedition to determine a border between the countries. This expedition travelled down the Purus River, which was heavily exploited by rubber tappers. During this time, Cunha produced his essay "Os Caucheros" which provides an archetype for the "cauchero" or rubber tapper. According to historian Susanna B. Hecht, who wrote The Scramble for the Amazon and the Lost Paradise of Euclides Da Cunha, Carlos Scharff, a successful rubber baron on the Purus River, was "the model for the Caucho King in Da Cunha's essay Os Caucheiros". In 1909 Cunha was admitted as chairman and professor of Logic at the Colégio Pedro II, a public secondary school in Rio.

Euclides da Cunha married Ana Emília Ribeiro, daughter of major Sólon Ribeiro, in 1890. The couple had five children. Ana Emília had an affair with Dilermando de Assis, a young Army lieutenant. On August 15, 1909, finding about his wife's affair, Cunha went to Assis' house to kill him. He shot Assis and his brother Dinorah, failing to kill either. Assis shot Euclides when he had already left his house, and the writer was killed. According to Hecht's account, there was doubt whether Dilermando murdered a fleeing man who had run out of bullets, or whether Euclides still was a threat to Dilermando (which would make the murder self-defense.) The jury decided for the latter scenario and acquitted Dilermando. Cunha was 43 years old.

== Works ==
- 1902 Os Sertões (Rebellion in the Backlands: University of Chicago Press ISBN 978-0-226-12444-5) -- also Penguin Classics in a new translation, ISBN 978-0-14-310607-4
- 1907 Contrastes e confrontos, lit. Contrasts and Confrontations
- 1907 Peru versus Bolívia
- 1909 À margem da história - series of essays written by Cunha after the Peruvian-Brazilian joint expedition on the Upper Amazon.
- 1939 Canudos, diário de uma expedição – news articles published in the periodical O Estado de S. Paulo
- 1967 Canudos e inéditos – news articles published by the periodical O Estado de S. Paulo

Preceded by Valentim Magalhães (founder)	Brazilian Academy of Letters - Occupant of the 7th chair 1903 — 1909	Succeeded by Afrânio Peixoto
