= Solange Bibas =

Brazilian sports journalist

Solange Nunes Bibas (Belém, Pará, 1918 — São Paulo, São Paulo, August 29, 1982) was a Brazilian sports journalist. He worked at A Gazeta Esportiva and covered the 1958 and 1982 football World Cups. In the 1982 one, he was appointed as the official redactor of the Brazilian Football Confederation. Several times, he wrote for "Miroir du Football", a French football newspaper which talked a lot about South-American football.

A couple of months after his death, a street in Tatuapé district in São Paulo was named after him.

== Bibliography ==
- As Copas Que Ninguém Viu (The Cups Nobody Saw) (Editora Planeta, 1982)
