= Ana Maria Bahiana =

Brazilian-born American author, journalist and lecturer

- Born: 15 December 1950; Rio de Janeiro, Brazil
- Occupations: Journalist, Author, Lecturer, Film Producer
- Years active: 1972–present
- Known for: Cultural journalism, Golden Globe Association
- Notable work: Jimi Hendrix: domador de raios (1979); Nada será como antes (1979); América de A a Z (1994); A luz da lente (1998); Almanaque anos 70 (2006); Como Ver Um Filme (2012); Almanaque 1964 (2014)

Ana Maria Bahiana (born 1950) is a Brazilian-born Los Angeles-based American author, journalist and lecturer known for her work in cultural journalism. She has worked in a variety of media: newspapers, magazines, television, radio and the Internet.

== Biography ==
Ana Maria Bahiana was born in Rio de Janeiro, Brazil.

While still in college Bahiana worked as editorial assistant at the first Brazilian edition of Rolling Stone magazine in 1972, for which she also contributed reviews and interviews. She wrote for the major Brazilian newspapers – O Estado de S. Paulo, Folha de S. Paulo, O Globo and Jornal do Brasil. In the international press, she contributed to publications in France, United States and Australia, and worked for five years as West Coast Bureau Chief for the British trade magazine Screen International. On television, Bahiana was foreign correspondent in Los Angeles for Telecine, Globosat and Rede Globo, having also collaborated, as producer and interviewer, for the US cable channel Bravo and Canada's CBN.

Bahiana and Paoula Abou-Jaoudé are the only Brazilian members of the Hollywood Foreign Press Association, responsible for the Golden Globes annual awards; since 2015 Bahiana has been serving as deputy editor of the HFPA's official website, goldenglobes.com. In 2006, she wrote and co-produced, the feature film 1972, directed by José Emilio Rondeau.

Bahiana is currently working as writer and researcher on the documentary LA+Rio.

== Music ==
In 1970, while still in college, Bahiana got involved in Rio de Janeiro's independent/underground music scene. There she met composer José Mauro, and started a collaboration that would yield two recorded albums, Obnoxius (1970) and Viagem das Horas (1971).

Through the years, parallel to her work as author and journalist, Bahiana wrote lyrics for composers Marlui Miranda, Sueli Costa and the bands O Faia and Contas de Vidro.

== Works ==
- Jimi Hendrix: domador de raios (Editora Brasiliense, 1979; Editora Pazulin, 2006).
- Nada será como antes (Editora Nova Fronteira, 1979; Editora Senac Rio, 2006).
- América de A a Z (Editora Objetiva, 1994).
- A luz da lente (Editora Globo, 1998).
- Almanaque anos 70 (Ediouro, 2006).
- Como Ver Um Filme (Nova Fronteira, 2012).
- Almanaque 1964 (Companhia das Letras, 2014).

== Collaborations ==
- "Anos 70 – Música Popular", collection of essays, Funarte, Rio de Janeiro, Brazil, 1980
- "Los Angeles". An essay in the omnibus America, edited by Nelson Brissac Peixoto, Companhia das Letras, São Paulo, Brazil, 1989.
- "Tom Jobim", "Caetano Veloso", "Jorge Benjor" - curated, researched and wrote bilingual (English-Portuguese) booklets for these CD boxed sets, Universal Music, 2007–2008.
- Vida Modelo, with John Casablancas; authorized biography, Objetiva, Rio de Janeiro, 2008.
- "An Offer He Could Not Refuse: Francis Ford Coppola on The Godfather III," in the anthology The Godfather Family Album, Taschen America, Los Angeles, 2009.
- Interview: Kathryn Bigelow, in the anthology Kathryn Bigelow, org. Peter Keough, University Press of New England, Boston, 2013.
- "Unsung Pioneers, Fierce Explorers – Female Filmmakers in Latin America", in the omnibus Celluloid Ceiling, org. Gabrielle Kelly and Cheryl Robson, Supernova Books, London, 2014

== Translation ==
- Dispatches/ Despachos do Front, Michael Herr, Objetiva, Rio de Janeiro, 2005.
- Easy Riders, Raging Bulls/ Como a Geração Sexo Drogas e Rock n Roll Salvou Hollywood, Peter Biskind, Intrínseca, Rio de Janeiro, 2006.
