= Luís Cristóvão dos Santos =

Luíz Cristóvão dos Santos was born in Pesqueira, Brazil on 25 December 1916. He was a sociologist, anthropologist, folklorist, columnist, writer, advocate, and journalist. He was also known by the nicknames Ziul and Pajeú.

Luíz Cristóvão dos Santos studied fishing in Recife and completed his bachelor's in law and social sciences at the Recife Faculty of Law in 1944. He was a promoter of justice in various districts of the hinterland of Pernambuco and director of the newspaper Gazeta do Pajeú during the 1950s. He was a candidate for State Deputy UDN – National Democratic Union in 1947 and after obtaining 1,339 votes became an alternate member. He also held candidacy for vice-mayor of the city in 1955. He participated actively in the cultural and political history of Pernambuco, fighting for citizens' rights and defending the state. Due to the premature death of a child, he retired as the second letter from lawyer OAB, the Brazilian Bar Association.

A writer since adolescence, Luís Cristóvão dos Santos was also a journalist published in The Voice of the Hinterlands, the Gazeta Pajeú, Diário de Pernambuco and Jornal do Commercio and developed the Journal of Cultural Supplement of the state of Pernambuco. He wrote for several other newspapers in the country and contributed many works in the national press and Italy.

Luíz Cristóvão dos Santos was a member of the Academy of Arts in Pernambuco, Chair Four, and Patron of Chair 12 in the College of Letters and Arts Pesqueirense, a position once occupied by the immortal Lamb of Jarival Amaral. He twice received the award Othon Bezerra de Mello from the Academy of Arts Pernambuco with the book Paths of Pajeú (Chronic, 1955, foreword by José Lins do Rego), which became a best seller within a year in Rio de Janeiro, and Paths of the Hinterland (Chronic, 1970, preface by Mauro Mota). He was bestowed with the Medal of Merit of the Joaquim Nabuco Foundation for relevant contribution to Brazilian culture and in September 1970 received the title of Citizen of Recife.

He also contributed to the development of several books, documentaries, films, and national reports on the Brazilian jungle and the river Pajeú, for which he was nicknamed. He was later recognized in Italy as a scholar of Frei Damião the Order of Friars Minor Capuchins in Sicily. His biography is being developed under the title ZIUL.

Luíz Cristóvão dos Santos died on 30 June 1997 in Santa Joana Hospital in the city of Recife of a stroke.

== Books ==
- Hino ao sertão (1937)
- Adolescência (1938)
- Bilhetes do Sertão (1950)
- Padre Cottart – um vigário do Pajeú (1953)
- Carlos Frederico Xavier de Brito – o bandeirante da goiaba (1953)
- Brasil de chapéu de couro (1958)
- Caminhos do Pajeú (1953)
- Caminhos do Sertão (1970)
- Chão de Infância (1983)
- Paisagem Humana do Pageú (inacabada)
