= Narciso Vernizzi =

Brazilian sports journalist and a radio broadcaster

Narciso Vernizzi (October 21, 1918, in Brazil – July 11, 2005, in São Roque, São Paulo, Brazil) was a Brazilian sports journalist and a radio broadcaster.

He worked for 56 years on Rádio Jovem Pan in São Paulo, he became a sports journalist in 1947. He created his first sport show permanently on Brazilian radio in the 1960s.

He was known in all of the state of São Paulo with O Homem do Tempo (The Weather Man) in a part of 1963, he was the first radio broadcaster who emitted weather bulletins on radio and on television. He later worked on TV Redord in São Paulo, a part of 1965. He was a weatherman.

He died at the age of 86 of natural causes, he left himself with two sons, Sérgio and Celso (both are meteorologists) in various networks.
