= Jorge de Lima =

Brazilian poet (1893–1953)

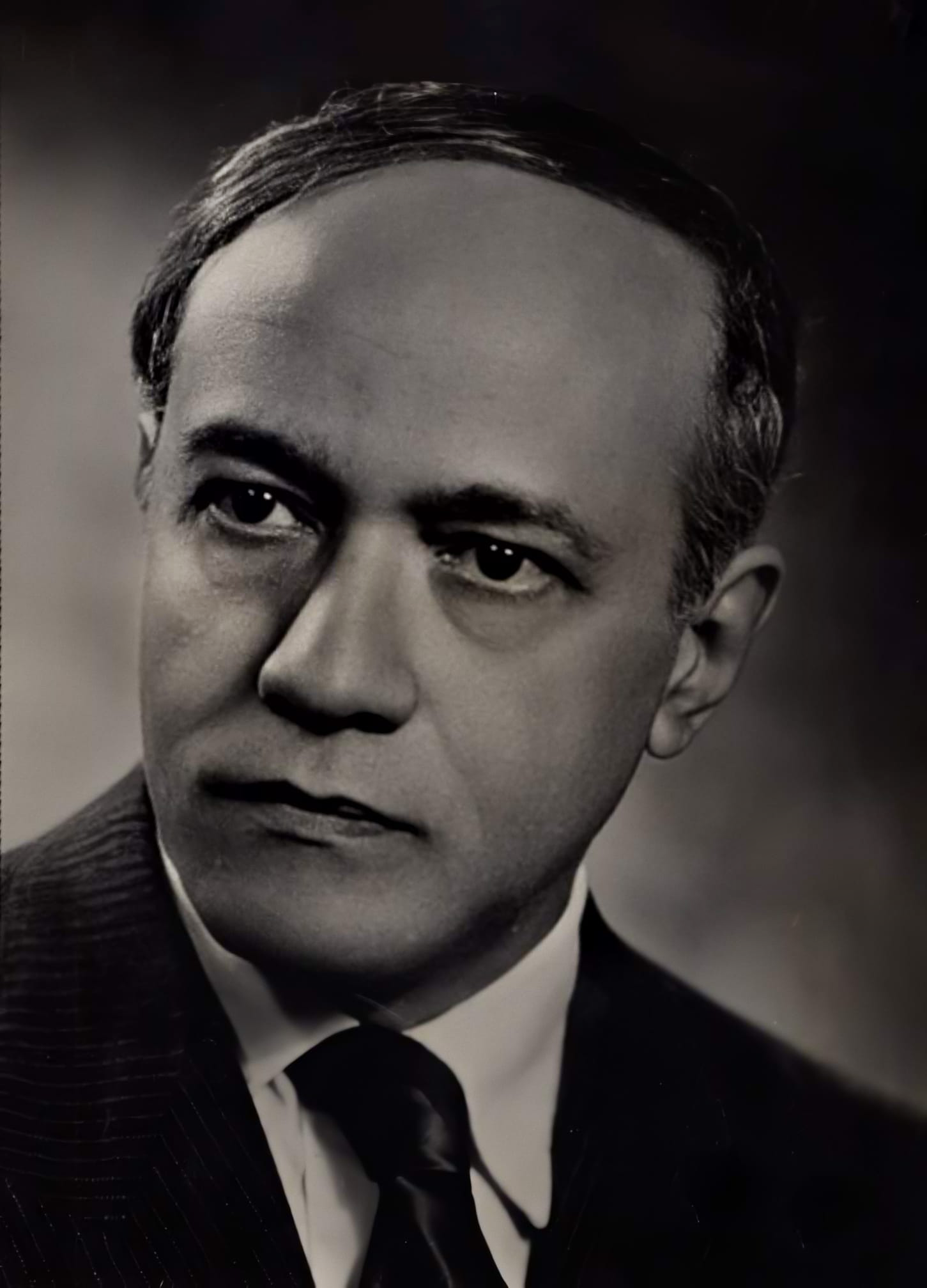
Jorge de Lima, anos 1940

Jorge Mateus de Lima (Brazilian Portuguese: [ˈʒɔʁʒi maˈtewz dʒi ˈlimɐ]; April 23, 1893 – November 15, 1953) was a Brazilian poet, physician, novelist, politician, biographer, essayist, translator and painter. His poetry was initially composed in Alexandrine form, but he later became a modernist.

== Biography ==
He was born in União dos Palmares, the son of a wealthy merchant. When he was nine, he moved with his mother and siblings to Maceió. In 1909, when only sixteen, he moved to Salvador where he began his medical studies. He completed his studies in Rio de Janeiro in 1914, but he decided that he wanted to make his name as a poet. That same year he published his first book of poems, Alexandrians XIV.

He returned to Maceió in 1915 where he devoted himself to medicine, literature and politics. He served as a member of the Legislative Assembly of Alagoas from 1918 to 1922. The Revolution of 1930 inspired him to move to Rio de Janeiro where he set up an office near Cinelândia. In time, this office also served as an art studio and a meeting place for intellectuals. There he made the acquaintance of writers such as Murilo Mendes, Graciliano Ramos and José Lins do Rego. During this period he published ten books, including five collections of poetry.

In 1935 Jorge de Lima converted to the Roman Catholicism and many of his poems reflected his religiosity.

In 1939 he decided to dedicate more time to the visual arts as well, participating in some exhibitions. In 1952 he published his most important book, the epic Invention of Orpheus. In 1953, only months before he died, he recorded poems for the Archives of the Spoken Word at the Library of Congress. He died in Rio de Janeiro, aged 60.

== Commentary ==
Between 1937 and 1945, his candidacy for the Brazilian Academy of Letters was rejected six times. According to Ivan Junqueira, who served as the Academy's President for the year 2004-2005, the Academy committed an injustice to the author whose literary work was so well received by critics and the public. Referring to Invention of Orpheus, he says, "... even today, more than 50 years after its publication, there is no Brazilian poet who does not remember him. "

The writings of Jorge de Lima may be read in many ways: The uneasy coexistence between tradition and the new; the vulgar and the sublime; the regional and universal. His work touches on social injustices that have changed little since the beginning of civilization "... of human misery, the attempt to overcome our moorings and our limitations", according to poet and journalist Claufe Rodrigues.

Ítalo Moriconi, poet and professor of Brazilian literature at Rio de Janeiro State University, in analyzing the work of Jorge de Lima, does not believe in the hypothesis that religious issues have hampered Lima's career: "As a religious poet Jorge de Lima never produced anything with the quality of a Murilo Mendes in "Freedom Poetry".

== Works ==
=== Poetry ===
- Poesia Completa, edited by Alexei Bueno; critical commentary by Marco Lucchesi, et al., Editora Nova Aguilar, (1997) ISBN 85-210-0037-5
- Invenção de Orfeu, with illustrations by Fayga Ostrower. Livros de Portugal (1952)

=== Translations in English ===
- Poems, translated by Melissa S. Hull. Privately printed, Rio de Janeiro (1952).
- "The Death of the Madwoman", "From Canto IV - The Apparitions: IV", "The Great Mystical Circus", "Yesterday's Great Aerial Disaster", translated by Ricardo da Silveira Lobo Sternberg and Duane Ackerson, in Stinktree no. 2, November 1972. Stinktree Press, Memphis (1972).
- The Great Mystical Circus, translated by Ricardo da Silveira Lobo Sternberg and Duane Ackerson. Stinktree Press, Ithaca (1978).

=== Novels ===
- O Anjo, G. Costa (1941)
- Calunga (1935), reprinted by Civilização Brasileira (1997) ISBN 85-200-0456-3
- A Mulher Obscura (1939), reprinted by Civilização Brasileira (1998) ISBN 85-200-0462-8

== Sources ==
- Menezes, Raimundo de. Dicionário Literário Brasileiro. 2ª edição. Rio de Janeiro: Livros Técnicos e Científicos (1978)
