= Roberto Civita =

Brazilian businessman and publisher

- Born: 9 August 1936; Milan, Italy
- Died: 26 May 2013 (aged 76); São Paulo, Brazil
- Education: Wharton School of the University of Pennsylvania
- Occupations: chairman of the board of directors and Editorial Head of Grupo Abril chairman of the board of Abril Education chairman of the board of Trustees of the Victor Civita Foundation; Editor-in-chief of the Veja magazine
- Spouse: Maria Antônia Civita
- Children: Three
- Parent(s): Victor Civita and Sylvana Civita

Roberto F. Civita (9 August 1936 – 26 May 2013) was a Brazilian businessman and publisher. Born in Italy, he emigrated at the age of two with his family to New York in 1938 to escape effects of the Race Laws. They moved again to Brazil in 1949, where his father Victor Civita founded Editora Abril, a publishing house.

After college and graduate school in the United States, the younger Civita entered the family business in the 1960s. He helped its expansion and development as Grupo Abril, becoming one of the largest publishing companies in Brazil. Beginning in 1982 he became president, and took over all operations in 1990. He became chairman of the Board of Directors and Editorial Head of Grupo Abril.

He has also headed related education foundations and participated in leadership of the Lauder Institute and the Wharton Advisory Board. He was part of the Board of Overseers of the International Center for Economic Growth (founded in 1985 with headquarters in Panama).

== Early life and education ==
Roberto Civita was born on 9 August 1936 in Milan, Italy to Sylvana and Victor Civita, who worked in publishing. He had a younger brother Richard. His family moved to New York City in 1938 after passage of the Race Laws in Italy. In 1949, the family moved to São Paulo, Brazil, where his father, Victor Civita, had founded the Editora Abril, first publishing comic books under license from the Walt Disney Company. (Donald Duck was the first title, released in 1950).

Civita did his college studies in the United States, beginning with nuclear physics at Rice University, Texas, but gave up the subject when he realized that it was not his calling. He graduated in journalism from the University of Pennsylvania and got a graduate degree in economics from its Wharton School of Economics. He also has a degree in sociology from Columbia University, New York City. During this time, he also worked as a trainee at Time Inc.

== Marriage and family ==
He married Leila Francini of São Paulo. The couple had two sons (Giancarlo and Victor Civita Neto) and a daughter together. In more recent years, he married Maria Antônia Neto.

== Career ==
Civita returned to Brazil in the mid-1960s, to assume various positions at Editora Abril and organize a radical change in Brazilian journalism. He worked to establish a strong reputation for fact checking and an independent press.

In addition, with his participation, Abril launched several major magazine titles for specific markets, such as Quatro Rodas (automotive), Claudia and Manequim (for women), Exame (business), Realidade, and Superinteressante (Science & Culture). From the founding in 1968 of the weekly Veja, the flagship of the company, Civita served as its Editor-in-Chief. Realidade was described as a model for editorial independence. The Company began to sell magazines through subscription sales rather than depend on newsstands.

Like other publishers, Civita struggled to maintain press freedom under the long years of the repressive military government that ruled Brazil from 1964 to 1985. Some compromises were forced, as the government censored press it did not like.

Mino Carta, co-founder and former managing editor of Veja (between 1968 and 1976), said that the military government's censorship imposed on the magazine was "very harsh." It started in 1969 and did not end until 1976, when he resigned (or was fired, according to other sources). According to Carta, for being deemed an "enemy of the government", the military asked Roberto Civita to fire him. In exchange, the state bank Caixa Econômica Federal granted the company a loan of US$ 50 million.

In 1982 Civita became president of the Grupo Abril, which had become one of the largest publishers in Brazil. He took command of all operations in 1990, after the death of his father Victor. By his own death, Civita had become a billionaire several times over.

== Controversies ==
Decades later, Civita and Carta appeared to defend their actions related to Veja in the 1970s. In 2007 Civita said that Veja had no need to "please everyone", even if criticized for purportedly editorializing in its articles about politics. He also said that he had not made decisions to satisfy advertisers or the government. In 2007 he said, "We're doing the magazines for readers, not to please advertisers, nor government, nor friends."

During that 2007 interview, Civita also said he did not oppose his reporters using material discovered in wiretaps, even if they were not legally authorized. He said his newsroom's legal department advised on what could be published from such sources. He was willing to have internal debate about the use of such recordings, but never really did it.

Five years later, an investigation made by the Brazilian Federal Police that used legally authorized wiretaps found that Policarpo Jr., the bureau chief of Veja in Brasília, who talked very often with the mafiosi Carlinhos Cachoeira, had ordered illegal wiretapping of politicians linked to the government party to gain material for his reporters.

Following this revelation, a May 2012 article in Mino Carta's CartaCapital compared Civita to the controversial British publisher, Rupert Murdoch, because of his effective control of so much of the Brazilian media and the use of methods that were less than ethical. This was published during the proceedings of the CPMI do Cachoeira, a widely reported parliamentary investigation of the Goiano Capo Carlinhos Cachoeira. It found that Cachoeira had unorthodox connections with politicians who were (as the ex-senator Demóstenes Torres) and are (as the Rio's councilman Stepan Nercessian) opposed to the Workers Party.

In response, the Rio de Janeiro newspaper O Globo, (owned by the Marinho family's media conglomerate, the largest in Brazil) editorialized: "Roberto Civita is not Rupert Murdoch." The editorial said that "blogs and pro-government media outlets that act as the auxiliary line of radical sectors of the PT" had unleashed "an organized campaign against the Veja magazine."

=== Naspers ===
Searching for capitalization, in May 2006 Civita sold 30% of the Editora Abril to the South Africa's media conglomerate Naspers. This group was noted for its historical ties with the apartheid regime. In response to criticism, Civita said he chose this alternative rather than to capitalize the publishing arm from Grupo Abril. He did not want to submit his long-term vision to satisfy quarterly results for shareholders.

== Civic life ==
Civita has been active in foundations and non-profits related to education: he was chairman of the board of Abril Educação, and chairman of the Board of Trustees of the Victor Civita Foundation.

Maintaining ties to the University of Pennsylvania, he has participated in leadership of the Lauder Institute and the Wharton Advisory Board.

In addition to serving as a member of the Board of Governance of the Instituto Millenium, Civita was on the Board of Overseers of the International Center for Economic Growth (founded in 1985 with headquarters in Panama).

== Quotes ==
- No passion, no magazine.

== Legacy and awards ==
- 1988, Maria Moors Cabot prize, Columbia University
- 1997, Commander of the Order of the Lion of Finland
- 1997, Doctor Honoris Causa, Faculdade de Comunicação Social Cásper Líbero
- 2002, Grand Officer of the Order of Rio Branco, Brazilian Government
