= Eduardo Oinegue =

Brazilian journalist

- Born: May 23, 1964 (age 62); São Paulo, Brazil
- Occupations: Journalist and TV host

Eduardo Oinegue Fulfaro, best known as Eduardo Oinegue (born May 23, 1964), is a Brazilian journalist and TV host.

He is the anchor of Jornal da Band, commentator on BandNews TV and BandNews No Meio Do Dia, on BandNews FM.

== Career ==
He studied journalism at the Pontifical Catholic University of São Paulo (PUC-SP). He started working as a journalist in 1982, aged seventeen, when he was in his freshman year at college, initially in neighborhood newspapers, then as a freelancer. He graduated in 1985 and the following year, after completing the 3rd Abril Journalism Course, he went to work at Editora Abril, where he remained for almost twenty years.

He began his professional career as a reporter for Veja São Paulo magazine. He was then invited to transfer to Veja magazine, where he was a reporter, editor, executive editor and editor-in-chief.

He was part of the magazine's politics section, headed the Veja branch in Recife for a year and five months. For six years (1989 to 1995) he directed the magazine's branch in Brasília, a position he took over at the age of 24. From there, he commanded the coverage that culminated in the impeachment of President Fernando Collor. Invited by the directors of Veja to return to São Paulo, he became executive editor, being promoted to editor-in-chief by magazine director Tales Alvarenga. He has overseen coverage on a variety of topics and has written numerous covers on education, health, justice, law enforcement, politics, economics and business.

Invited by Roberto Civita, he was also editorial director at Exame, the main business magazine in Brazil. In the various positions he held, he made contact with the main decision makers in the country, including politicians, businessmen, academics and scholars. He commanded coverage of the biggest Brazilian trade wars, involving big brands and big companies.

He left Editora Abril in 2005, when he founded the publisher Análise Editorial in partnership with journalists Silvana Quaglio and Alexandre Secco, of which he is president of the editorial board.

Análise Editorial is the only Brazilian publisher specialized in the production of yearbooks. It edits the Análise Advocacia 500, which lists the most admired lawyers and law firms in the country according to those responsible for the legal areas of the thousand largest companies operating in the country. It also edits the Legal and Financial Analysis yearbooks, which profile more than 2,000 executives responsible for the legal and financial areas of large Brazilian companies. Annually, the yearbook awards the legal and financial executives most admired by their peers, in a popular event. Análise Editorial also edits the National Advocacy Directory, the largest survey of law firms in the country.

Eduardo Oinegue acted as a communication consultant for large business groups, advising their directors on the best ways to prevent the main risks to business reputation or mitigate damage in the event of a crisis. His professional consulting activity was interrupted when he became an anchor for BandNews FM.

In an article published in the magazine Observatório da Imprensa, he states that communication should be part of the decision-making process, not just a consequence of a strategy by governments or companies. "A good part of the problems that impact an organization's image would be solved if a communication professional-whose technical knowledge the leaders respect-were integrated into the decision-making group to participate in the formulation of the strategy", he wrote. According to Oinegue, Brazilian leaders, both in the public and private sectors, do not show much appreciation for "communication". "There are clear signs that it only gains importance when the so-called 'image crisis' appears". To the dismay of public and private managers, the origin of the problems that compromise the institutional image is rarely due to failures in communication. It will end up there at some point, of course. Blaming communication, the butler of this story, is a classic case of botched investigation, it's blaming the bullet for the homicide, instead of looking for who pulled the trigger," he added.

Between 2009 and 2011, he was the publisher of Portal iG (Internet Group), when he hired 180 professionals and structured the rebuilding of his journalism department. In 2016, he became a columnist for Rádio Bandeirantes and BandNews FM. Invited by President Michel Temer to be a government spokesman, he declined the invitation. He suggested hiring a diplomat for the job and handed the president a communication plan.

In the 2018 elections, he was a columnist for the newspaper O Globo, writing on Mondays. Eduardo Oinegue is also a speaker. In his lectures, he traces the political and economic history of Brazil, analyzing the scenarios that lie ahead. He has several articles published in newspapers and magazines of great circulation.

From November 2016 to August 2019, he was a commentator on politics and economics on the Jornal Gente program on Rádio Bandeirantes. His column Identidade Brasil aired Mondays, Wednesdays and Fridays at 9am. Jornal Gente is presented by José Paulo de Andrade, Rafael Colombo, Claudio Humberto, Thais Heredia and Pedro Campos.

In February 2019, Oinegue was announced as the new presenter of Jornal da Band after the death of Ricardo Boechat. He took over on May 13.
