= José Hamilton Ribeiro =

Brazilian journalist and author

- Born: August 1, 1935 (age 91); Santa Rosa de Viterbo, Brazil
- Education: Faculdade Cásper Líbero
- Occupation: Journalist
- Notable work: O Gosto da Guerra

José Hamilton Ribeiro is a Brazilian journalist and author. He has worked as a reporter and editor for the magazines Realidade and Quatro Rodas, the newspaper Folha de S. Paulo, and the programs Globo Repórter, Fantástico, and Globo Rural, and is the author of fifteen books. In December 2012, a study by the news bulletin Jornalistas & Cia concluded that Ribeiro, as measured by the number and importance of prizes won, is the most decorated journalist in Brazilian history.

== Early life and education ==
Ribeiro's father was a small farmer and his mother a housewife. He studied in a public school, where he was editor of the student newspaper. In 1955 Ribeiro went to Rio de Janeiro to attend the Cásper Líbero School of Journalism. He was expelled from the school during his last year because of a strike that he had led.

== Career ==
=== Teaching ===
He spent several years teaching at Casper Libero. He also taught at the Faculty Armando Álvares Penteado (FAAP/SP) and served as a member of the Evaluation Committee of the School of Communication and Arts at the University of São Paulo (ECA/USP).

=== Journalism ===
Ribeiro began his career in journalism in 1955 at Radio Bandeirantes in São Paulo, where he worked the night shift and spent significant time accompanying leading caipira musicians. Soon afterwards he went to work in print journalism, becoming a cub reporter for O Tempo in 1955 and a staffer for the Folha de S.Paulo in June 1956. In 1957, he covered the first Mass held in Brasilia.

He went to work in 1962 for Editora Abril in 1962, where he was made editor-in-chief of the magazine Quatro Rodas where he gained attention and notoriety. In 1966, he moved onto the monthly Realidade, also published by Editora Abril, where, he later recalled, the articles were “long and deeply ambitious,” often involving three or four months of investigative reporting.

Ribeiro went to Vietnam in 1968 to cover the war, and lost the lower part of his left leg in a mine explosion near Quang Tri. He was transported by helicopter to the American hospital in Qui Nhon, where his left leg was amputated just above the ankle, and from there was transferred to the United States for further treatment. He reacted to this incident with equanimity, telling a reporter at Qui Nhon that as soon as he had been able to sit up in bed he had begun writing his story. A photograph of him after the accident appeared on the cover of Realidade.

Among the stories Ribeiro went on to cover after his accident was the assassination of Robert F. Kennedy.

After serving as editor-in-chief of Realidades, he worked from 1973 to 1975 as a reporter for the magazine Veja, also published by Editora Abril.

In the later 1970s, tired of government censorship, Ribeiro stopped writing journalism for a while and instead focused on helping news organizations in São Paulo to modernize their newsrooms. He was director of El Diario, in Ribeirão Preto, in 1975, and of Day and Night, in São José do Rio Preto, in 1977, where he won another Esso Award in the category Regional/Southeast.

He returned to São Paulo in 1978 to become editor-in-chief of journalism for TV Tupi, and general director of its program Pinga Fogo. At the same time he managed the newsroom of the Jornal de Hoje in Campinas.

In 1981, working as a freelancer, Ribeiro did his first work for TV Globo. His report on the Pantanal region was well received and widely discussed and was invited to work full-time in Rio on the Globo Reporter. His first report, aired on 10 June 1982, was about mining in Serra Pelada, Pará, was the first on that series in which the reporter was seen on-screen rather than just being an off-screen voice.

=== Books ===
- O Gosto da Guerra (1969): a report about the War in Vietnam, and recounts the land-mine incident that led to the loss of part of his left leg
- Pantanal Amor Bágua (1974): named Best Book for Youth by the São Paulo Association of Art Critics (APCA) in 1978
- Senhor Jequitibá (1979)
- Gota de Sol (1992): a book about the history of the orange, from ancient Chinese gardens to the present, with pictures by Amilton Vieira
- Vingança do Índio Cavaleiro (1997)
- Jornalistas 37/97 (1998): a historical account published on the occasion of the sixtieth anniversary of the Journalists' Union of São Paulo
- Música Caipira as 270 Maiores Modas de Todos os Tempos (2006): a celebration of 270 of the best caipira songs
- O Repórter do Século (2006)
- Os Tropeiros Diário da Marcha (2006)

== Views ==
Asked in a 2012 interview if it is a good idea for journalists to study journalism, Ribeiro answered the more education, the better. “A country is made by good professionals in all areas.” He lamented that “almost 70% of the adult population in Brazil can not understand ten lines of text” and that Brazilian universities, which given the country's population should be represented among the world's top ten, are not even in the top hundred. “In a country so backward and so needy,” he said, “to be opposed to journalism school, any school, is cynicism or malice.”

== Awards and honors ==
=== Awards ===
- Esso Journalism Award

Ribeiro has won the Esso Journalism Award, the most important of Brazilian journalism awards, seven times, a record that has yet to be surpassed. He won his first Esso Award in 1963 and his second in 1964. While at Realidades, he won four more Esso Awards. Three of them, in 1967, 1968, and 1973, were in the category Scientific Information; in 1972, he was part of a team that won the award for Best Contribution to the Press, for a special issue about the Amazon that included reportage by Ribeiro. He won a seventh Esso Award in 1977 while serving as editor of Dia e Noite.

- Maria Moors Cabot Prize

The School of Journalism at Columbia University awarded Ribeiro the Maria Moors Cabot Prize in 2006. “Long after most reporters burn out,” the citation read, Ribeiro “is still out there working,” reporting on “the most isolated areas of Brazil and the rampant development that threatens them.” Describing him as “a role model for generations of young Brazilian journalists” and “a hero to the many viewers of TV Globo,” the citation praised Ribeiro's contribution to “new forms of in-depth reportage” and noted that “when the military dictatorship in Brazil made it impossible to do independent big-city journalism, he moved to the countryside so that he could continue working as a newspaper reporter.” Finally, the citation recounted Ribeiro's move to television, “where he pioneered long-form, documentary-style reports for Globo Rural, a morning show devoted to under-covered issues in Brazil's vast countryside....Ribeiro has created more than 500 stories for Globo Rural in the last two decades. His coverage of the Amazon and the Pantanal regions has awakened viewers to the environmental threat facing Brazil, often moving them to take action to protect the countryside.”

- Prêmio Embratel de Jornalismo, for Música Caipira (2004) (Category: Cultural Journalism)
- Prêmio Brasileiro Imortal (2008) (National Category)

=== Honors ===
- José Hamilton Ribeiro Journalism Prize

The José Hamilton Ribeiro Journalism Prize, named after him, honors the best reporting in the Portuguese language, was first awarded in September 2011. It is presented by the Rio Preto Regional Union of Journalists and the Secretaria Municipal de Cultura, with support from the Union of Professional Journalists in the State of São Paulo and the Federation of Portuguese-Speaking Journalists.
