= César Civita =

American-Argentine publisher

- Born: September 4, 1905; New York City, U.S.
- Died: April 9, 2005 (aged 99); Buenos Aires, Argentina

César Civita, born Cesare Civita (September 4, 1905 — April 9, 2005) was an American-Argentine publisher, who in 1936 became general manager of Arnoldo Mondadori Editore in Italy. Following the passage of the Race Laws in 1938, he emigrated with his family to New York to escape the discriminatory restrictions, since they were at risk for being Jewish.

He moved with his family again in 1941 to Buenos Aires, becoming Walt Disney's representative in Argentina and founding Editorial Abril that year. By the 1960s, his publishing house produced nine magazines.

His brother Victor Civita emigrated to Brazil, where he established Editora Abril in São Paulo in 1949. It developed into Grupo Abril, one of the largest publishing houses in the country.

== Early life and education ==
He was born Cesare Civita in New York City to Italian-Jewish parents Vittoria Carpi, an opera singer, and Carlo Civita, a businessman. His younger brothers were Vittorio and Arturo. The family returned to Milan, where the boys were raised and went to school.

As a young man, Cesare developed an early interest in publishing, particularly related to literature and graphic art. He also got involved in cinema, producing a film.

== Career ==
In 1936 Civita was named general manager of the prestigious publishing house, Arnoldo Mondadori Editore. He and Cesare Zavattini redesigned Pitigrilli's literary magazine, Grandi Firme, incorporating cover art by Gino Boccasile and attracting the magazine its highest circulation. Civita obtained an exclusive license to publish Walt Disney's American comic books in Italy. He also ventured into cinema, producing a documentary that earned an award at the Venice Film Festival.

After the Fascist regime enacted the 1938 Race Laws, Civita chose to emigrate to New York City with his wife, Mina, and their three children. He became a talent agent for illustrators. Among others, he represented Saul Steinberg, for whom Civita sold portfolios to Harper's Bazaar and Life Magazine. This enabled him to secure a United States visa for the Jewish artist.

== In Argentina ==
In 1941, Civita relocated with his family to Buenos Aires and became Disney's representative in Argentina. He also established the Editorial Abril publishing house. Disney traveled to Argentina while preparing his upcoming animated film, Bambi, and modeled its forest backdrop after Los Arrayanes National Park.

Civita diversified Editorial Abril after 1945, hiring a number of talented illustrators and cartoonists from both Argentina and Italy, among them Hugo Pratt, Mario Faustinelli, Alberto Ongaro, Ivo Pavone, Héctor Oesterheld, Alberto Breccia, Dino Battaglia, and Paul Campani. César's younger brother, Victor Civita, established Editora Abril in São Paulo, Brazil in 1949, which developed into one of the largest publishing houses (Grupo Abril) in Brazil.

Smaller than its Brazilian counterpart, Editorial Abril published nine magazines by the 1960s, including Parabrisas (for auto enthusiasts), Corsa (auto sports), Claudia (a women's magazine), Adán (for men), Panorama (general interest), and Siete Dias Ilustrados (news), as well as the French comic series, Asterix, and others. Some of the most celebrated figures in Argentine journalism worked for Abril at the time, including illustrator Hugo Pratt, photographer Grete Stern, sociologist Gino Germani, writers Rodolfo Walsh, Francisco Urondo and Juan Gelman, and poet Miguel Ángel Bustos.

Civita was joined in the enterprise by numerous family members, including his wife, Mina (who edited Claudia). Their daughter Adriana became the company's chief correspondent during the Vietnam War.

Civita and his wife separated. In 1972 Civita purchased stock in Papel Prensa; the public-private newsprint manufacturer was established by the regime. He and Editorial Abril became its principal private stockholders. Following a change in government and return of Juan Perón to the presidency in 1973, his Minister of Finance, José Ber Gelbard, imposed regulations restricting imported machinery. Civita sold his stake in Papel Prensa to financier David Graiver that year. Civita, who never enjoyed good relations with Peronism, came under pressure partly because of the numerous left-wing writers he employed. Pressed on the subject, he asserted that "the Abril publishing house is not against anyone, except Nazis and Fascists."

Civita's attempt to keep balance earned the enmity of the Argentine Anticommunist Alliance, and he was the target of numerous death threats, and a kidnapping attempt. In 1975, a commando attack by helicopter fired on his 18th-story Belgrano apartment. He and his family joined his brother Victor in São Paulo, Brazil.

Though the publishing house's best-selling title, Panorama, closed in December 1975, Editorial Abril continued to operate. It was sold in 1982 to a partnership between Celulosa Argentina and Rizzoli Editores.

Civita lived in Brazil and Mexico for a number of years, and returned to Argentina after democratic government was restored following the years of the Dirty War. He died in Buenos Aires in 2005, at age 99.
