= Realidade =

Former Brazilian magazine

Realidade (Reality) was a Brazilian magazine published by Editora Abril between 1966 and 1976. It was considered a mark in Brazilian journalism at the time, presenting in-depth stories, first-person reporting and nontraditional graphic design.

Throughout its existence, the magazine has gone through three different phases.

== First phase ==
Realidade was established by Editora Abril in 1966. The first phase of the magazine, from 1966 to 1968, was probably the most notable, when the moment's issues, often controversial, were addressed in detailed articles inspired by New Journalism, in a structure with narrative focus. In their articles, the journalists had complete freedom to write the texts in first person, enter dialogues with dashes, making detailed descriptions of places, objects and features. Moreover, it was possible to switch the focus of the narrative of omnipresent observer to witness or participant in the events.

December 1968 would bring the hardening of the military regime, when the Institutional Act nº 5 (AI- 5) was decreed, establishing press censorship in Brazil. That month's edition marked the end of the best period of Realidade, according to its reporters José Marão and José Hamilton Ribeiro.

== Second phase ==
In 1969, Realidade enters its second phase, which would last until mid-1973. In addition to changes arising from the introduction of AI-5, this second phase results from internal dissent in writing, much of them arising from censorship. The text loses the denouncement tone, although the format has not undergone abrupt changes. The literary style was kept, as well as fieldwork, research and the illustrative value of the image. However, little by little, the periodical was taking the "newsmagazine" model.

== Third phase ==
From October 1973, Realidade's covers undergo a radical shift. The magazine abandons investigative journalism. In the following editions it becomes more of a newsmagazine, with "how-tos" and verbs in the imperative, like "learn", "become", "win" etc.. The pagination of the magazine reveals similarities with Veja at the time.
