= Mino Carta =

Italian-born Brazilian journalist, publisher and writer (1933–2025)

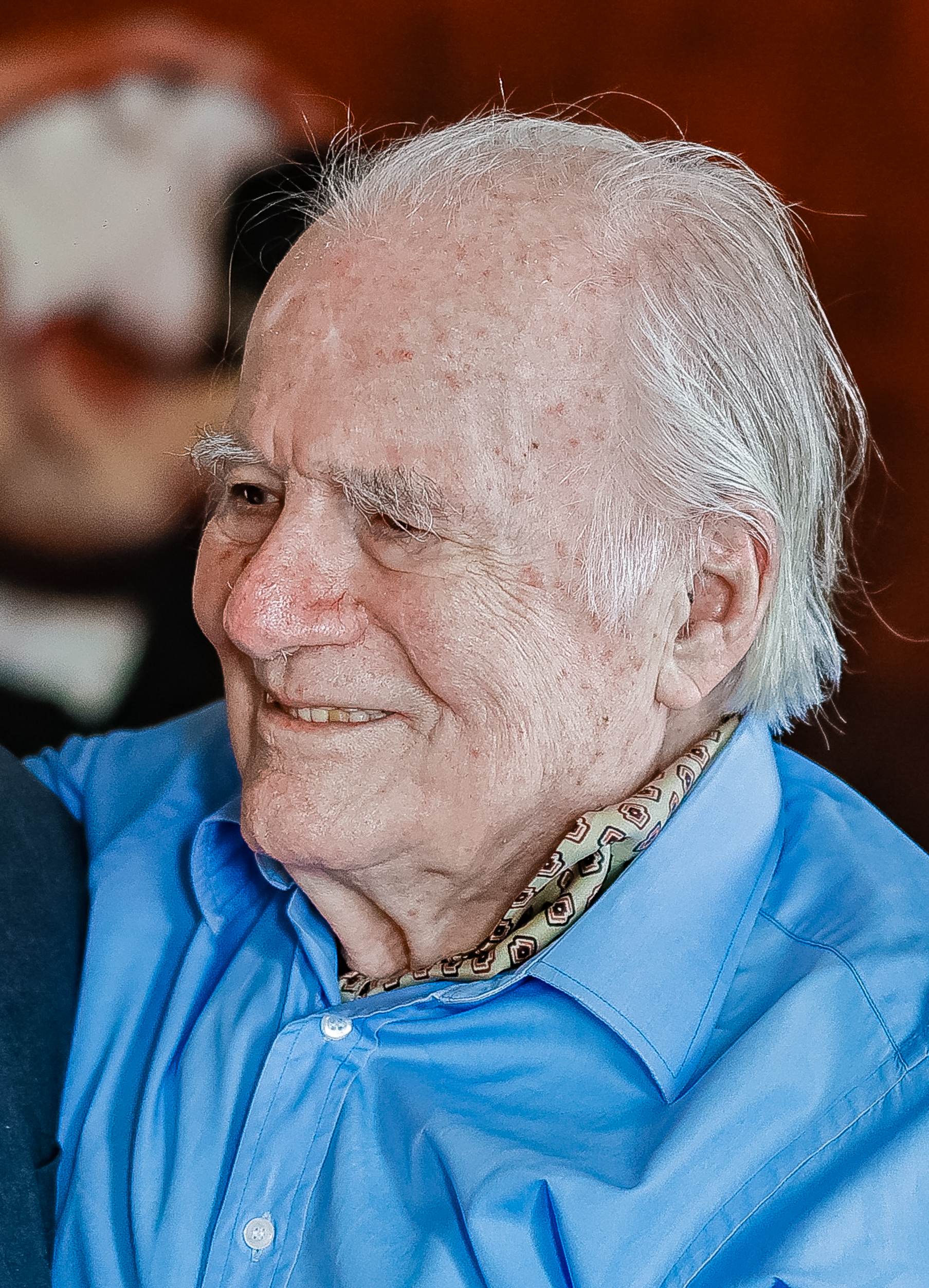
- Carta in 2024
- Born: Demetrio Giuliano Gianni Carta; September 6, 1933; Genoa, Italy
- Died: September 2, 2025 (aged 91); São Paulo, Brazil
- Occupation: Journalist
- Known for: Co-founder of Veja, Istoé and CartaCapital

Demetrio Giuliano Gianni Carta (September 6, 1933 – September 2, 2025), (Note: His date of birth could be between September 6, 1933 and February 6, 1934.) known as Mino Carta, was an Italian-born Brazilian journalist, publisher and writer. Carta helped in the creation of Veja, IstoÉ and CartaCapital, three influential and iconic news magazines published in Brazil.

== Life and career ==
Carta arrived in São Paulo, São Paulo with his family after the Second World War in 1946, when he "still wore short pants". He was probably 12 or 13 years old at that time. He recalls São Paulo as a "quiet and orderly" town with "human measures".

In 1951, Carta did a vestibular exam and was admitted at the University of São Paulo's traditional Law School of Largo São Francisco. His enrollment records state that he was born on September 6, 1933. He attended the classes of the first years, but quit and ended up never graduating from higher education.

In 1960 he started his career in journalism by helping to found Editora Abril automobile magazine Quatro Rodas. In 1966, he introduced new journalism in Brazil by founding São Paulo-based newspaper Jornal da Tarde. Two years later, he helped Victor Civita of Abril to found Veja, which is the leading newsmagazine in the country, with a circulation of over a million copies per edition in 2017. Unsatisfied with the result, he helped in the foundation of IstoÉ in 1976. Yet not completely satisfied with the result, he founded CartaCapital in 1994. On the new magazine, he and other columnists emphatically criticize neoliberal and neoconservative politics defended by other publications.

Of all the publications Carta helped create during his life, only one, the defunct Jornal da República, failed to succeed. The 1970s newspaper had a large deficit on its budget.

Disappointed with the position of Luiz Inácio Lula da Silva in the Cesare Battisti case, Carta decided to retire from his blog and his column on CartaCapital.

Carta died on September 2, 2025, around four days before his 92nd birthday. He was survived by his daughter Manuela Carta, and he also had a son, Gianni Carta (1963–2019), both from his marriage to Daisy Mesquita. He later married Maria Angélica Pressoto, who died in 1997.

== Published books ==
In 2000, Carta released his first novel, titled O Castelo de Âmbar (The Castle of Amber), in which he narrates a semi-biographical story. The main character, Mercúcio Parla, may be his alter-ego; Parla narrates what he considers to be the promiscuous relationship between politicians, journalists and media thanes during almost half a century in the recent history of Brazil. Written as a fictional story, some connections may be done with the reality, such as the character's home land "Ausônia" being Italy and his house on "Rua Áurea" being Rua Augusta.

In 2003, Carta published his second novel A Sombra do Silêncio (The Shadow of Silence), a follow-up to O Castelo de Âmbar. In this book, the main character finds himself on the Rua Áurea with Core Mio, "the most laughing girl in the neighbourhood", starting what is described by the author as the "only and authentic love of their lives".

== Awards ==
- 2003: Comunique-se Award for Best Businessperson of a News Vehicle – CartaCapital
- 2005: Comunique-se Award for Best Businessperson of a News Vehicle – CartaCapital
- 2006: Award of the Association of Foreign Press Correspondents in Brazil for Most Prestigious Journalist of the Year
- 2007: Comunique-se Award for Best Businessperson of a News Vehicle – CartaCapital
