= Luís Nassif =

Brazilian journalist

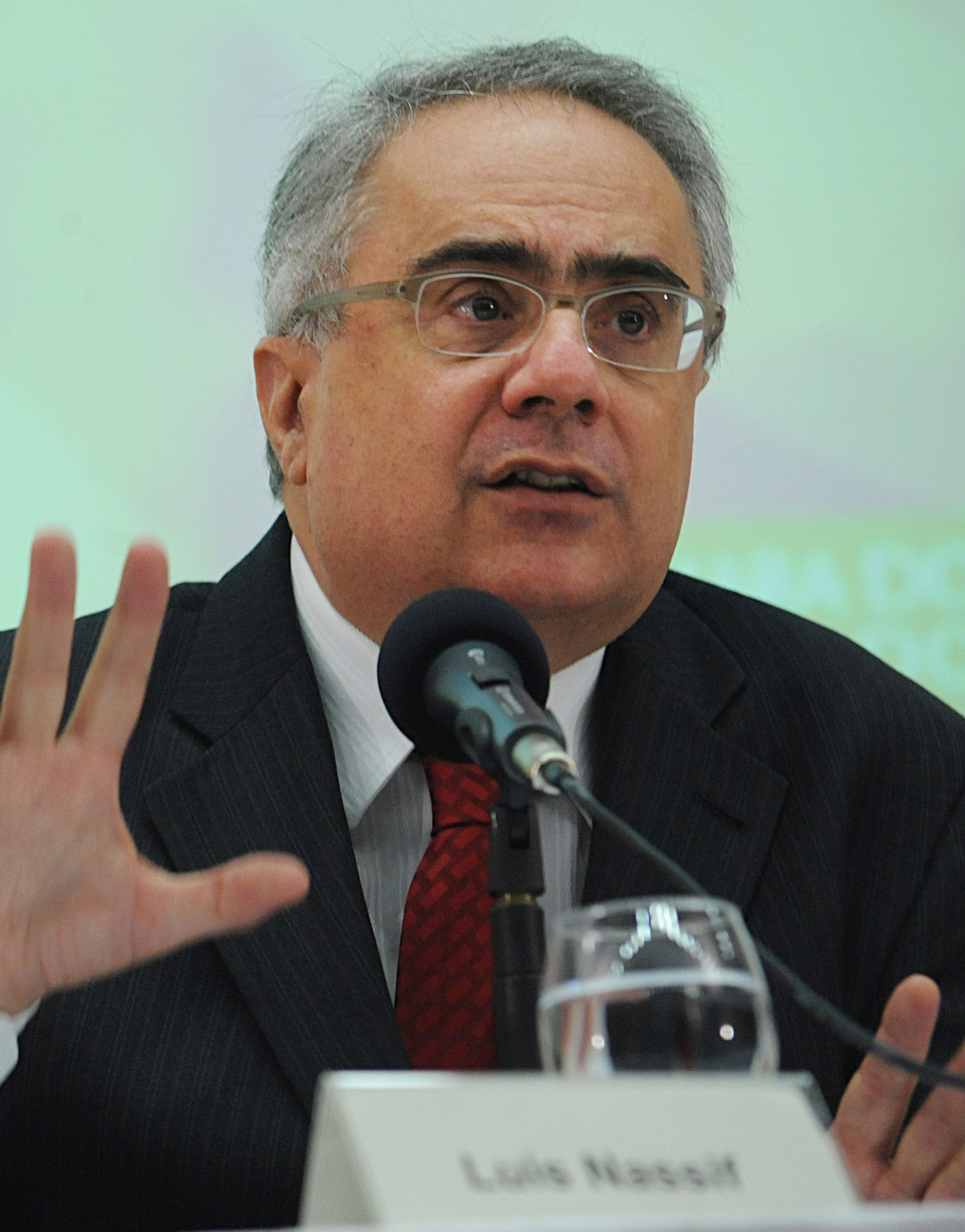
- Born: 24 May 1950 (age 75); Poços de Caldas, Minas Gerais, Brazil
- Occupation: Journalist
- Years active: 1970–present

Luís Nassif (born 24 May 1950) is a Brazilian journalist. He was a columnist and a member of the editorial board of Folha de S.Paulo, writing for the newspaper for many years on the economy. With his economic theories, he analyzed areas related to economics, such as the state of science and technology in Brazil. He is also a composer, player of the bandolin, and a researcher of choro.

== Biography ==
Nassif was born on 24 May 1950 in Poços de Caldas in Minas Gerais state. He is of Italian and Lebanese background. His sister is fellow journalist Maria Inês Nassif. His first journalistic experience was at 13, editing for Grupo Gente Nova magazine in Poços de Caldas. At 15, he did an internship at the newspaper Diário de Poços during school breaks.

After graduating from secondary school in São João da Boa Vista in 1969, he passed his vestibular for the School of Communications and Arts at the University of São Paulo. He began to work professionally starting on 1 September 1970 as a trainee for Veja. He was hired full-time in January 1971. In 1974, he became an economic reporter for the newspaper. The following year, he became responsible for the newspaper's financial notebooks.

In 1979, Nassif transferred to Jornal da Tarde due to the quality of the newsreader and economic report news-chief. There, he created the "Seu Dinheiro" section, one of the first forays into personal finances in the Brazilian press, as well as the journal "Jornal do Carro". In 1983, he would go on to Folha de S.Paulo, where, by year's end, he created the "Dinheiro Vivo" and participated in the project that led to the creation of Datafolha. In 1986, he won the ExxonMobil Journalism Award, in their main category, for his series of reports on the Cruzado Plan. He would stay with the newspaper until 1987.

In the beginning of the 1980s, he organized, with the São Paulo branch of the Order of Attorneys of Brazil, a seminary with all the branches of the OAB, which resulted in the first large-scale campaign for consumer rights, including for borrowers in the Sistema Financeiro da Habitação.

During this same decade, Nassif was one of the presenters for São Paulo na TV, alongside Paulo Markun and Sílvia Poppovic, one of the first openly independent TV broadcasts in Brazil. Produced by Abril Vídeo, it was broadcast by TV Gazeta. In 1985, he created his own program on TV Gazeta, called Dinheiro Vivo. In 1987, from the program came Agência Dinheiro Vivo, which broadcast information about the economy and business.

In 1990, he went on to present Dinheiro Vivo on the public broadcaster TVE Brasil. Afterwards, he would be accused of not forwarding to TVE Brasil the 20% of funding of which he would have received from sponsors to his program, though he had been obliged to by the terms of his contract.

Nassif returned to Folha de S.Paulo in 1991 as a columnist on the economy. In 2006, his contract was not renewed. He was still, however, the economics commentator on both Rede Bandeirantes and TV Cultura. He also presented on radio stations, being one of the presenters for Jornal Gente on Rádio Bandeirantes of São Paulo alongside José Paulo de Andrade and Salomão Ésper.

He would later return to TVE Brasil, now renamed as TV Brasil, presenting the program Brasilianas.org. The program ran until 2016.

== Jornal GGN ==
In April 2013, Nassif launched the test run for Jornal GGN (Grupo Gente Nova), an online magazine, as a journalistic project whose purpose was to cover themes that he saw as being less covered by mainstream media. These topics included management, innovation, social rights, and transitional justice, along with commentary on current events. That same year, in October, he would create a partnership with iG, which hosted his blog Blog do Nassif for five years. He also began to publish in the portal a column with political and economic analyses on themes presented and discussed on GGN.

Afterwards, Jornal GGN would become an independent portal, dedicating it to the "production of critical content, from the collective construction of news linked to citizenry, politics, economy, culture, and development", with special participation by specialists on the subject. The portal adopted a collaborative model of journalism, searching to, according to Nassif, escape the "left-right dichotomy that has characterized online journalism" The portal has, still, one of its declared goals to be "the collection of specialized mini-social medias, with the main topics for discussion—the public and private sector—to deepen the understanding of relevant themes in Brazil in the 21st century, covering not just the factual, but the strategic visions of the country". However, in 2019, mass media analysis website Observatório da Imprensa classified it as a left-wing media website.

== Awards ==
Nassif was the winner of the award for Best Economic Journalist in Written Press by the website Comunique-se in 2003, 2005, and 2008, by direct vote. He also received the iBest Award for Best Political Blog by popular vote and by Academia iBest.

== Legal issues ==
In 1990, the management led by Leleco Barbosa, son of presenter Chacrinha, of the state-owned TV Educativa, led the Ministry of Education to conduct an audit for potential administrative irregularities such as those made by then-producer Nassif, who was responsible for the production of Dinheiro Vivo. He had been accused of not having declared the amount that they had received from donors, though it had been required by contract to pass on 20% of funds raised to the broadcaster. Barbosa had been removed from his position in October 1991, after a series of complaints of corruption and misuse of financial resources.

In October 2002, Nassif had been initially sentenced, in the first instance, to three months of detention and to pay for ten minimum salaries for publishing a note in Folha de S.Paulo about a lawsuit brought forward by Mendes Júnior against the Companhia Hidrelétrica do São Francisco (CHESF), in which he claimed that the lawsuit was "one of the most daring ventures against public coffers." Nonetheless, in January 2004, this sentence was reverted by the Criminal Appeals Court of São Paulo. In the sentencing that absolved Nassif, it was understood that there had been "simple lack of care by the journalist and not an intention to offend someone else's honor". The court raised the point that "to condemn the defendant would be, undoubtedly, curtailing the freedom of protest or of expression and access to information, in patent mistreatment of article 5, articles IV and XIV of the Federal Constitution, and even article XIII, of the same deposition."

Nassif began, in 2007, a series of articles about the behind the scenes and new editorial path adopted by Veja, in which he analyzed the strategy taken on by parent company Editora Abril and how the choice was to emulate decisions made by Rupert Murdoch with Fox News in the United States. For some of these articles, he was sued by the editor of the magazine and sentenced by a judge, in 2010, to pay an indemnification of 50,000 Brazilian real, with the possibility of recourse.

On 11 August 2005, still under the context of the Mensalão, Nassif used his column with Folha de S.Paulo to criticize Diogo Mainardi for his usage of sources "off the record". He guaranteed that he would not mention the identity of his source during a conversation with federal deputy José Janene of the PP and even so, wrote in his column for Veja revealing who was his source and still gloating of such a fact. In his column in the following edition of Veja, Mainardi insinuated that Nassif had potentially received in Dinheiro Vivo undue donors from BNDES. Coincidentally, in the same edition, telephone companies controlled by the business group led by Daniel Dantas had big public announcements published. In some of his texts to Folha between June and August 2005, Nassif analyzed the delicate situation of Dantas to maintain shareholder control of the telephone companies and that his businesses had been contacted with one of Marcos Valério's advertising firms.

In 2008, Veja published an article by Mainardi asserting that Nassif would be fired from Folha for lobbying efforts through his column. However, Otávio Frias Filho, director of the editorial board for Folha de S.Paulo, declared that Nassif leaving was a decision that was mutually agreed upon. 23 years after Mainardi made the accusations and BNDES conceded unjustified benefits to Dinheiro Vivo, the court obligated Veja to allow for Nassif to write his response per right of response rules.

On 25 February 2010, Nassif was sentenced by the 4th Chamber of Privacy Rights of the Court of Justice of São Paulo, together with Portal IG, to indemnify the director of Veja, Eurípides Alcântara, due to a series of four articles in his blog in which Nassif claimed that Alcântara was the direct contact for Dantas with Veja, and that this had been the result of an operational agreement between the publisher and Grupo Opportunity. By a majority, the court understood that it was clear that it was abusive towards the magazine's director; According to desembargador Carlos Teixeira Leite Filho, Nassif, the appellant, did not only admit, as was reiterated, that after reflecting on its meaning, had what was sufficient to clearly identify the intention of devaluing and morally harming Alcântara. The indemnification was established at 100,000 real (50,000 for each of the defendants); the decision is eligible for appeal.

In April 2015, Nassif disclosed a warrant in which the then-president of the Chamber of Deputies, Eduardo Cunha, solicited indemnifications for moral damages due to a report published in 2013 in his blog that Cunha had found offensive. In response, Nassif solicited readers of the blog to collaborate in a compilation of news articles published about Cunha.

In August 2020, the bank BTG Pactual alleged defamation by Nassif and fellow journalist Patrícia Faermann for reports published on Portal GGN showing the connections between BTG Pactual and bids in São Paulo, and maneuvers in COAF, the no COAF, the capitalization regime of Chile among other things. The court, in a preliminary decision, ordered the removal of 11 reports from the portal. In October of that year, the decision was reneged. In September 2022, the Supreme Federal Court definitively removed the censure imposed on Nassif, Faermann, and Portal GGN and allowed for the republication of the reports.

== Works ==
Literary:

- O Menino do São Benedito e Outras Crônicas (2001, Ed. Senac, São Paulo, 456 pp.)
- O Jornalismo dos Anos 90 (2003, Ed. Futura, 320 pp.)
- Os Cabeças-de-Planilha (2007, Ed. Ediouro, 312 pp.)

Phonographs:

- Roda de Choro Nosso Choro (RGE CD, 1996), accompanied by Nosso Choro, made up of Zé Barbeiro (guitar), Miltinho de Mori (cavaquinho and arrangements), Stanley (clarinet), Bombarda (accordion) and Marcelo (pandeiro).
