= Grupo Abril =

Brazilian media group

Abril S.A.

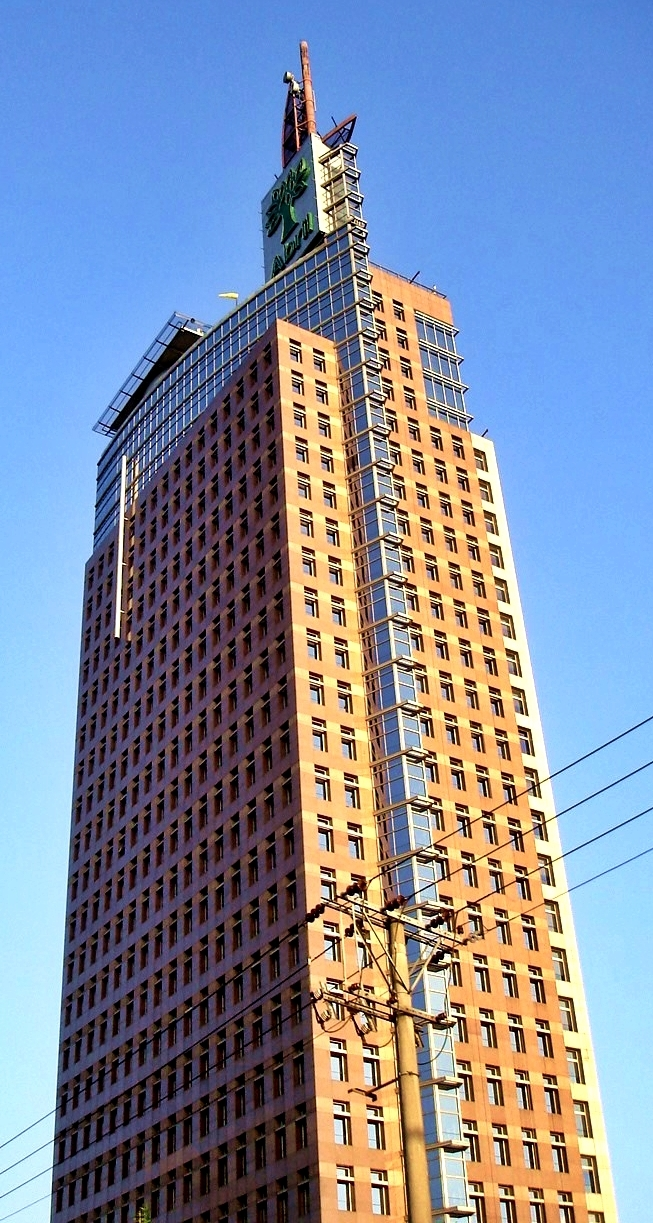
- Grupo Abril headquarters in São Paulo
- Type: Private
- Industry: Media conglomerate
- Founded: 1950; 76 years ago
- Headquarters: São Paulo, Brazil
- Key people: Benjamin Ramalho (CEO and Chairman)
- Products: Publisher, Internet, Television
- Revenue: ▲US$5.0 billion (2012)
- Net income: ▲US$400.0 million (2012)
- Owner: Civita family
- Number of employees: 9000
- Subsidiaries: Editora Abril; TVA (until 2012); Abril Radiodifusão (sold to Grupo Spring); UOL (sold to Folha)
- Website: Grupo Abril (relationship to the main Page on Portuguese)

Grupo Abril (Portuguese pronunciation: [ˈɡɾu.pu aˈbɾiw]; lit. 'April Group', also known simply as Abril) is a Brazilian media conglomerate headquartered in São Paulo. The company is the holding company of Editora Abril, which publishes the weekly newsmagazine Veja.

== History and profile ==
Victor Civita, an Italian businessman, founded Editora Abril in 1950, which was the first publisher of Walt Disney comics in Brazil. He also published other comics and books. Gradually, he developed magazines for specific markets. In the 1960s, with his son, Roberto Civita, he expanded to publishing several market-specific magazines, such as Quatro Rodas, Claudia, and others. Veja, the weekly newsmagazine, was founded in 1968 and led by the younger Civita.

Abril had several partnerships in the emerging Brazilian pay TV market during the 90s, including local franchises of American channels such as Disney Channel, MTV and ESPN. The company also launched a cable TV provider service called TVA (Televisão Abril), which by 1999 was considered one of the top two cable carriers in Brazil, along with Globocabo (Grupo Globo).

With exception of MTV and TVA, all properties were sold at the beginning of the 2000s. In 2007, Fiz TV and Ideal channels were launched in an effort to return to the pay TV market, but the project was a failure and it was discontinued in 2009. Later in 2012, TVA was completely sold to Telefónica, which changed its name to Vivo TV on April 15, 2012, which also included Telefônica TV Digital and Ajacto, which took over service with Telefónica Brasil and Abril discontinues MTVr in September 2012. The following year, the MTV brand returned to Viacom, and in late 2013 its broadcast network was sold to Grupo Spring, which publishes the Brazilian edition of Rolling Stone.

Grupo Abril also is the owner of Fernando Chinaglia, the largest distributor of publications in Latin America (acquired in 2007).

In addition to its media interests, the group has entered the education market with assets that produce many curriculum and instructional materials, including internet applications.

Today, the group is chaired by Fábio Barbosa following the death of Roberto Civita on May 26, 2013.

== Assets ==
=== Abril Mídia ===
==== Magazines ====
- Veja
- Superinteressante (Brazilian version of Muy Interesante)
- Mundo Estranho (Superinteressante spinoff)
- Aventuras na História (Superinteressante spinoff)
- Exame
- Guia do Estudante
- VIP
- Placar
- Capricho
- Quatro Rodas
- Nova (Brazilian version of Cosmopolitan)
- Estilo de Vida (Brazilian version of InStyle)
- Elle
- Claudia
- Manequim
- Boa Forma
- Saúde! É Vital
- Caras
- Casa Claudia
- Arquitetura & Construção
- Minha Casa
- Recreio
- Vida Simples

==== Out-of-home advertising ====
- Rede Elemídia

=== Abril Educação ===
==== Publishers ====
- Editora Ática

==== Teaching systems ====
- Sistema Anglo de Ensino
- Ser Educacional
- GEO
- Sistema Farias Brito

==== Courses and colleges ====
- Anglo Vestibulares
- Colégio pH
- Alfacon Concursos
- Colegio Sigma

==== English ====
- Red Balloon

==== New business ====
- Sistema de Ensino Técnico ETB
- Ei Você
- Edumobi
- Alfacon - Preparatório para Concursos
- Escola Satélite

== Past assets ==
- MTV Brasil Ltda. (before named MTV Brasil, in 2005 change by enterprise Abril Radiodifusão or more in 2013 now, Spring Comunicação)
- MTV Brasil (was replaced after the business was returned to Viacom in October 2013)
- Listel (sold to BellSouth, now part of Carvajal-owned Publicar)
- Disney Channel (stake sold to Disney Channel Brazil)
- UOL (sold to the Folha)
- Abril Vídeo (closed in 1999, replaced with Brazilian subsidiaries of Walt Disney Studios Home Entertainment and 20th Century Studios Home Entertainment)
- Abril Music (record label operated between 1998 and 2003, ceased operations due to competition from major record companies)
- Bravo Brasil (a joint venture with the American cable network Bravo, currently Pramer-owned Film&Arts)
- CMT Brasil (the Brazilian version of Country Music Television, a joint venture with the network closed in 2002)
- Fiz (closed due to low carriage and viewership, concept lives on through Fiz na MTV)
- BRZ (between 2012 and 2014)
- TVA (between 1991 and 2012, unified for Telefónica, now Vivo TV)
- IdealTV (Acquired by Grupo Spring in 2015)

== Abril Vídeo ==
Abril Vídeo was Grupo Abril's home video division that distributed TV shows, videos and movies on VHS. It began operation on April 6, 1983 and closed in 1999. It distributed films from The Walt Disney Company and 20th Century Fox on VHS for the Brazilian market.
