= Capricho (magazine) =

Brazilian teen magazine

- Editor: Andréa Martinelli
- Categories: Teen magazine
- Frequency: Semiannual
- Publisher: Editora Abril
- Founder: Victor Civita
- First issue: June 18, 1952
- Country: Brazil
- Based in: São Paulo
- Language: Portuguese
- Website: capricho.abril.com.br

Capricho is a Brazilian teen magazine and digital media brand published by Editora Abril. Founded on 18 June 1952 by Victor Civita, it was the first women's magazine published by Abril and is widely regarded as the first major women's magazine in Brazil.

Originally dedicated to serialized photo stories known as fotonovelas, the magazine evolved into one of Brazil's most influential publications for teenage girls, covering fashion, beauty, entertainment, relationships, youth culture and social issues.

After ending its print edition in 2015, Capricho continued as a digital-only publication for nearly a decade before relaunching a printed edition in 2024.

The brand also organized the Capricho Awards, an annual fan-voted awards ceremony recognizing achievements in music, television, film, internet culture and youth entertainment.

== History ==
=== Founding and early years ===
Capricho was launched on 18 June 1952 by publisher Victor Civita, founder of Editora Abril. It was the company's first magazine aimed at women and initially focused on fotonovelas, a popular format consisting of serialized romantic stories told through photographs and captions.

The publication originally appeared on a biweekly schedule. Following modest initial sales, Civita expanded the format and transformed it into a monthly magazine, introducing articles on fashion, beauty, behavior and general lifestyle topics alongside the photo stories.

By the 1960s, Capricho had become one of the most widely circulated magazines in Latin America, reportedly exceeding 500,000 copies per issue.

=== Transition to a teen magazine ===
In 1982, the magazine underwent a major editorial redesign. The traditional fotonovelas were gradually removed and the publication shifted its focus toward fashion, beauty, relationships and youth behavior. Three years later, Capricho formally repositioned itself as a magazine aimed at teenage girls, becoming one of Brazil's pioneering publications in the segment.

During the late 1980s and 1990s, the magazine continued refining its identity, emphasizing reader participation, celebrity coverage and lifestyle content. By the mid-1990s it had reintroduced a biweekly publishing schedule and strengthened its position among Brazilian teenagers.

=== Digital expansion ===
Beginning in the 2000s, Capricho expanded beyond print and established a significant online presence. The magazine launched its official website and adopted emerging social media platforms including Facebook, Twitter, Instagram and YouTube.

In 2014, the publication introduced a smartphone-exclusive digital edition designed specifically for mobile readers. The initiative reflected changing media consumption habits among younger audiences and allowed greater audience participation in editorial content.

Researchers have identified the digital transition as one of the publication's most significant transformations, enabling Capricho to maintain its relevance among younger audiences during a period of declining print magazine readership.

=== End of print publication ===
On 2 June 2015, Editora Abril announced that Capricho would cease regular print publication as part of a broader restructuring of the company. The decision ended a print run that had lasted more than six decades.

Following the discontinuation of the print edition, Capricho continued operating as a digital-only media brand through its website and social media platforms. The publication maintained its focus on youth culture, entertainment, fashion, relationships and social issues relevant to Generation Z readers.

=== Return to print ===
In December 2024, Capricho announced the return of its print edition after nearly ten years as a digital-only publication.

The revived print magazine adopted a semiannual publication schedule, with issues planned for July and December each year. Influencer and entrepreneur Bianca Andrade appeared on the cover of the first issue published following the relaunch.

According to editor-in-chief Andréa Martinelli, the relaunch formed part of a broader editorial repositioning intended to strengthen the brand's connection with younger audiences while maintaining its legacy as one of Brazil's most recognizable youth publications.

In January 2025, Folha de S.Paulo reported on the magazine's return to newsstands as part of celebrations marking its 73rd anniversary.

== Capricho Awards ==
The Capricho Awards was an annual awards program organized by Capricho to recognize achievements in music, television, film, internet culture and youth entertainment. Winners were selected through online voting by the magazine's readers.

The awards became one of Brazil's most prominent youth-oriented entertainment events, honoring musicians, actors, television productions, digital creators and internet personalities. Voting regularly attracted millions of submissions from readers across the country.

The 2016 edition generated more than seven million votes and was livestreamed online. Influencer Bianca Andrade was among the event's major winners, while actors from the television series Cúmplices de um Resgate received several awards.

== Legacy ==
Capricho has been described by researchers as one of the most influential youth publications in Brazilian media history. Throughout its existence, the magazine adapted to changing social attitudes and consumer habits, reflecting successive generations of Brazilian teenage girls and young women.

Academic studies have highlighted the magazine's role in shaping discussions around fashion, beauty, relationships, self-identity and youth culture, while also documenting broader transformations in Brazilian society and media consumption patterns.

Media analysts have also cited Capricho as a notable example of a legacy print publication successfully transitioning into the digital era while maintaining a recognizable brand identity among younger audiences.

== See also ==
- Editora Abril
- Victor Civita
