= Análise Editorial =

- Company type: Private
- Industry: Communication
- Founded: 2005
- Headquarters: São Paulo, Brazil
- Key people: Eduardo Oinegue - Editorial Board President; Silvana Quaglio – CEO and publisher Alexandre Secco – Editorial Director
- Products: Magazines
- Website: Analise.com

Análise Editorial is a Brazilian publishing house headquartered in the city of São Paulo. The company, founded in 2005 by partners Silvana Quaglio, Alexandre Secco and Eduardo Oinegue, produces segmented journalistic content aimed at Brazilian and global economic analysis.

The first publication, Análise International Trade, was launched in 2005. Between 2005 and 2010, Análise Editorial launched ten new titles with annual periodicity and special editions.

== Publications ==
- Análise International Trade (Análise Comércio Exterior; now called Análise Brazil Global), which analyzes Brazil's position in the international market, was published in 2005, 2006, 2007, 2008 and 2010. The publication's bilingual (Portuguese and English) version first came out in 2007. The 2006 and 2007 editions promoted the Análise-FIA International Trade Award, partnership between Análise Editorial and the Administration Institute Foundation (Fundação Instituto de Administração). The publication maintains annual periodicity and a targeted distribution of 35 thousand copies.
- Análise Brazilian Lawyer 500 (Análise Advocacia 500), which lists the who's who of law firms and lawyers in Brazil, was published in 2006, 2007, 2008, 2009 and 2010. The publication maintains annual periodicity and a targeted distribution of 42 thousand copies.
- Análise Environmental Management (Análise Gestão Ambiental), which describes the environmental practices of Brazil's main companies and the profile of the main NGOs, was published in 2007, 2008, 2009 and 2010/2011. The publication is also available in a bilingual (Portuguese and English) version and maintains annual periodicity with a targeted distribution of 35 thousand copies.
- Análise Publicly-traded Companies (Análise Companhias Abertas), which analyzes the indexes of the main companies listed in the São Paulo Securities, Commodities and Futures Exchange (BM&FBovespa), was published in 2007 and 2008. The publication is also available in a bilingual (Portuguese and English) version.
- Análise Energy (Análise Energia), an appraisal of the Brazilian energy sector and its main companies, was published in 2008, 2009, 2010 and 2011. The publication is also offered in a bilingual (Portuguese and English) version and maintains annual periodicity with a targeted distribution of 35 thousand copies.
- Análise Healthcare (Análise Medicina), which lists the names of the who's who in Brazilian medicine and hospitals, was published in 2008 and 2009.
- Análise Legal and Financial Directors (Análise Diretores Jurídicos e Financeiros), which offers the profile of Brazil's main executives in these areas, was published in 2010 and was formed by the combination of both titles launched in 2008 and 2009. The publication maintains annual periodicity with a targeted distribution of 16 thousand copies.
- Análise HR Directors (Análise Diretores de RH), which offers the profile of Brazil's main executives in the human resources area, was published in 2010. The publication maintains annual periodicity with a targeted distribution of 14 thousand copies.

== Special editions ==
- Análise Justice (Análise Justiça), which analyzes the profile of the judges of the Brazilian Court of Appeals and the Supreme Court and their main decisions, was published as a special edition in 2006.
- São Paulo Outlook, which offers indexes, statements and analyses regarding the business environment of São Paulo city, was published in 2010 in Portuguese, English, Spanish and Mandarin. The edition received the support of São Paulo's City Government (Prefeitura de São Paulo) e SPTuris.

== See also ==
- Editora Abril
- Editora Globo
