= Superinteressante =

Brazilian magazine about science and culture

- Cover of issue #240 (June 2007)
- Editor: Bruno Vaiano
- Categories: science and culture magazine
- Frequency: Monthly
- Circulation: 463,000
- First issue: September 1987
- Company: Editora Abril
- Country: Brazil
- Language: Portuguese
- Website: http://super.abril.com.br

Superinteressante (Portuguese for "super interesting"), or Super, is a Brazilian science and culture magazine. Super employs simple language to explain complex topics to the general public. It is published monthly since September 1987 by Editora Abril and competes with Galileu, a magazine published by Editora Globo that follows a similar style.

== History ==
In 1987, Editora Abril bought the rights for Spanish magazine Muy Interesante, that would be translated and published in Brazil. However, the magazine's editors found that the style of the articles was not suitable for the Brazilian public, and decided to write their own pieces, maintaining Muy Interesante's layout and style.

The magazine was first published as a small paperback with less than twenty pages (called "Edição 0"), which came bundled with other magazines printed by Editora Abril. The second edition, however, was sold separately, featuring a cover article about superconductivity. That edition was a very big success and sold out at most retailers.

Nowadays, the magazine is the most influential of its genre in Brazil. It also spawned Mundo Estranho, that started as a section of Superinteressante, but grew to be a separate magazine.

== Sections ==
Superinteressante currently publishes the following sections:

- Desabafo: publishing of letters from the readers;
- Agora, escuta: the editor's answer to select letters published in "Desabafo";
- Superentrevista: interviews section;
- Essencial: everything the reader needs to know about one topic;
- Supernotícias: short and simple curiosities
  - Ciência Maluca: a column describing unusual scientific discoveries;
  - SuperPôster: a huge poster (generally two pages long) giving information about pop symbols, like "The Simpsons" or "Star Wars";
  - Connections: it makes a connection between two completely different subjects in five parts;
- Super-respostas: answers to questions made by the readers, this time in more detail;
  - Quem foi...: a biography of less-known people in history;
  - E se...: articles about what would happen if a certain event in history was different, like "What if the Axis had won the Second World War?" or "What if the Moon had never existed?";
- Super-Cult: cultural novelties;
- Retrô: about nostalgia (old movies, toys, etc.);
- Super-Manual: Survivor's Guide is its second title. Explains how to survive unusual events.
- Zoom: pictures and artwork of one subject, mixing art with science.

== Mundo Estranho ==
Mundo Estranho (Portuguese for "strange world") was first published in November 2001. It is a popular magazine among teenagers.

== Paperbacks ==
Abril is known to have published other magazines written by the same team as Super but with different subjects. These bear the "Super" logo right under their titles. They include:

- Aventuras na História (Portuguese for "adventures in history"), a history magazine;
- Vida Simples (Portuguese for "simple life"), focused in Philosophy applied to everyday life.
