= Djamila Ribeiro =

Brazilian philosopher and feminist

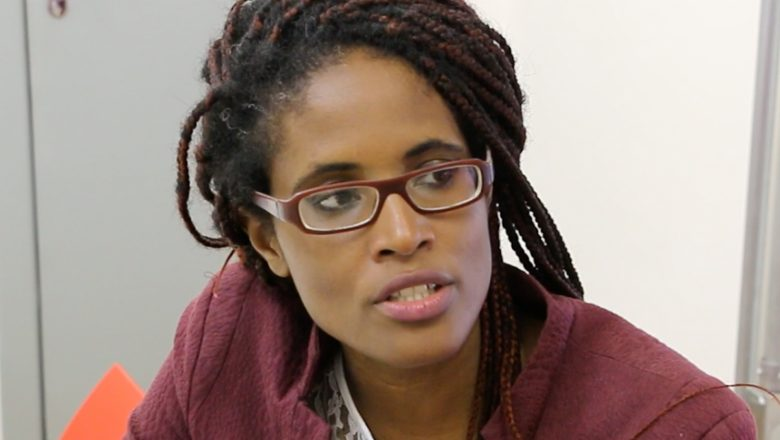
- Djamila Ribeiro, 2016
- Born: Djamila Taís Ribeiro dos Santos; 1 August 1980 (age 46); São Paulo, Brazil

Education
- Education: Federal University of São Paulo

Philosophical work
- Era: 20th-/21st-century philosophy
- Region: Western philosophy
- School: Black feminism; Critical race theory
- Main interests: Feminist theory; Political philosophy; Gender studies
- Notable ideas: Place of speech

Djamila Taís Ribeiro dos Santos (born 1 August 1980) is a Brazilian academic, philosopher, writer, and activist. She is best known for her studies on racism and Black feminism.

== Overview ==
She is currently a Visiting Professor at the Massachusetts Institute of Technology (MIT), where she is part of the Dr. Martin Luther King Jr. Visiting Professors Program.

A practitioner of candomblé and initiated for the orixá Oxóssi, she holds a master's degree in Political Philosophy from the Federal University of São Paulo (Unifesp). Ribeiro has emerged as a leading voice in black feminism, both in Brazil and internationally, with a significant presence in the media.

Ribeiro is a prominent figure in the publishing world, whose influence and contributions have been widely recognized. An author of works that have sold over 1 million copies, she also coordinates the Plural Feminisms Collection, an initiative that has published fourteen books by Black authors, predominantly women, with a focus on accessibility and the democratization of knowledge. This project has played a key role in promoting literary diversity and inclusion in Brazil, earning Djamila recognition for efforts in democratizing books and reading.

Additionally, her works have achieved international attention, being translated into multiple languages, as English (Yale University Press), French (Éditions Anacaona), Spanish (Txalaparta, Mandacaru and Tumbalacasa), Italian (Capovolte) and also featured at literary festivals around the world.

Since 2019, she has kept a weekly column at Folha de S.Paulo, while also previously writing for CartaCapital. Also in 2019, Ribeiro was considered by BBC one of the 100 most influential women in the world. Continuing in alignment with her political thinking, she filed a lawsuit against Twitter in 2020, under the accusation that the platform profits from racist comments and hate speech.

In 2022, she founded Espaço Feminismos Plurais a non-profit institute in São Paulo that offers a range of free services for women in social vulnerability. As a scholar, she worked at prestigious universities, like the Pontifical Catholic University of São Paulo and, in 2024, she was invited to teach for a semester at New York University (NYU) at Andrés Bello Chair.

== Djamila Ribeiro in the United States ==
In 2024, her book Lugar de Fala was translated into English and published as “Where We Stand” by Yale University Press. Translated by Padma Viswanathan and edited by Abbie Storch, this edition features a foreword by Nigerian philosopher Chimamanda Ngozi Adichie, one of Ribeiro's cited influences, and includes commentaries by influential U.S. scholars such as Patricia Hill Collins, Ibram X. Kendi, Linda Alcoff, Priyamvada Gopal, and Kia Lilly Caldwell.

Invited to assume the Andrés Bello Chair for Visiting Professors at New York University (NYU), Ribeiro spent a semester teaching courses on the feminisms of the Global South and exploring the intersectionality of race, gender, and class through theories developed by women from that region. During her tenure, she also hosted public debates and lectures featuring scholars such as Kendi, Selma Dealdina, Alessandra Devulsky, Linda Alcoff and Nadia Yala Kisukidi for public debates and lectures.

Following the launch of Where We Stand, Ribeiro embarked on an extensive tour, visiting institutions including Yale, Harvard, Spelman College, San Diego State University, Rutgers University, University of Georgia and UCLA, as well as the Politics and Prose bookstore, discussing the concept of "place of speech," a central theme in her work.

In Brazil, Ribeiro has promoted the translation and publication of U.S. literature. Through her publishing imprint, she released the first Portuguese translation of Black Power: The Politics of Liberation by Charles V. Hamilton and Kwame Ture, and she authored the foreword for the Brazilian editions of works by prominent American authors, including Maya Angelou’s I Know Why the Caged Bird Sings.

Ribeiro's initial foray into writing forewords in Brazil was with Angela Davis’s Women, Race, and Class. After initiating contact with Davis in 2015 to facilitate a translation, the Brazilian edition was published in 2016 and subsequently promoted through a book tour. In 2018, while serving as curator of Brazil's largest book club, Ribeiro selected Toni Morrison’s The Bluest Eye as her favorite novel. With Morrison's authorization and a few months before the author's death, Ribeiro wrote the foreword for the Brazilian edition - a contribution that played a significant role in the republishing of Morrison's complete works in Brazil.

In 2020, Ribeiro compiled a collection of articles and poems written by Audre Lorde, resulting in the book Sou sua irmã: Escritos reunidos e inédito. It was published by Editora Ubu, with a translation by Stephanie Borges.

In recognition of her work, Ribeiro was honored with the Gender Equality and Racial Inclusion Award at the 8th Leadership for the Americas Awards Gala hosted by the Inter-American Dialogue in 2023, held at the Organization of American States headquarters in Washington, D.C.

== Media ==
In 2014, an interview with journalist Pedro Bial on the program Na Moral brought Ribeiro national visibility. Her social media posts became a platform for discussing Black feminism, racism, and philosophy, resonating with a broad Brazilian audience. In addition to strengthening her digital presence, she also contributed an online column to CartaCapital for five years.

In 2018, TEDx São Paulo hosted Ribeiro for a talk titled “Precisamos romper com os silêncios” (“We Need to Break Through the Silences”), which addressed social inclusion and justice and marked one of her first appearances with international reach. During this period, she also contributed to media outlets such as Al Jazeera, CGTN, and The Guardian, among others. Since then, she has been contributing opinion articles to foreign publications, such as the Italian newspaper Il manifesto and the German magazine Der Spiegel.

During this period, Ribeiro created her Instagram account, which over the years has attracted 1.2 million followers. On the platform, she shares her political opinions, educational content on Black feminism, and updates on her media presence, including features on the covers of magazines such as Marie Claire Brasil, Claudia, Elle, Ela, O Globo, Forbes, and Forbes Life.

In 2019, Djamila was invited by Folha de São Paulo to write a weekly opinion column for its prestigious Ilustrada section. Her debut piece, published on June 21, was titled “Desculpe, Whitney” (“Sorry, Whitney”), in which she reflected on her love for Whitney Houston in contrast with the academic vanity that rejected pop music. In 2024, Djamila wrote a series of articles about the orixás in Brazilian Candomblé. In 2025, in an interview with the Portuguese newspaper Expresso, Ribeiro stated that the publishing house Caminho will release two volumes featuring her columns from 2019 to 2024, with the first being unveiled at the Lisbon Book Fair in June 2025.

She has been a recurring guest on Brazilian TV. At the prestigious Brazilian interview show Roda Viva and, in 2020, participated as a panelist during an interview with Brazilian musician Gilberto Gil - an icon of the Tropicália movement. Later, she interviewed Nigerian philosopher Chimamanda Ngozi Adichie, beginning the collaboration that led to Adichie writing the foreword for the United States edition of Ribeiro's work. In 2023, Ribeiro appeared on PodPah, one of Brazil's largest podcasts hosted by Igor Cavalari (Igão) and Thiago Marques (Mítico), and later that year on the nationally recognized podcast Bom Dia Obvious.

Ribeiro has also been involved in numerous brand campaigns. With Chevrolet, she co-created the Elas Na Direção campaign, which encouraged women to obtain their driver's licenses. Over 300,000 women registered for the campaign. For Continental, a home appliance company, Ribeiro recorded a series addressing gender equity. In the realms of beauty and fashion, she served as the face of both the La Vie Est Belle perfume campaign and Prada's Galleria bag campaign and in 2019, she participated in an Avon campaign.

Since 2020, Ribeiro has served as an ambassador for Johnnie Walker Brazil, co-creating and leading campaigns featuring prominent Black Brazilian feminists, such as the late Lélia Gonzalez (with her family's authorization), Carla Akotirene, and Kiusam Oliveira.

When questioned about negotiating contracts with brands, Djamila emphasizes the importance of the economic empowerment of the Black population. She also states the importance of the presence of Black community in media and advertisement.

== The Espaço Feminismos Plurais ==
The first step of Espaço Feminismos Plurais was taken when Ribeiro published her book Lugar de Fala, in 2017, inaugurating the Plural Feminism Collection. Written in accessible language and offered at an affordable price, the collection features paperback titles by Black women and men addressing contemporary issues of gender and race. Since its debut, the collection has expanded to 14 titles, with over 500,000 copies sold.

In 2022, Ribeiro furthered her commitment to social inclusion by founding the Espaço Feminismos Plurais (Plurals Feminisms Space), a non-profit organization dedicated to supporting socially vulnerable women in São Paulo. Through its initiatives, the Plurals Feminisms Space offers in-person services that include intellectual and professional training as well as free psychological, legal, literary, therapeutic, and dental support.

In 2023, with the support of Maurício Rocha, an entrepreneur and the organization's administrative director, the Instituto moved into a building in Moema, an upscale neighborhood in São Paulo. Between 2022 and 2025, the Instituto hosted institutional visits from prominent figures such as French Chancellor Catherine Collona, Fariba Derakshian from the Dutch Prince Claus Fund, and Mexican scholar Joaquín Terrones with a group of Black students from the Massachusetts Institute of Technology (MIT), among others.

The institute has also developed institutional initiatives in collaboration with the Formula 1 Grand Prix and the Escola do Mecânico to train women in courses on mechanics, sheet metal work, and forklift operation. Additionally, since 2023, it has organized acceleration programs for women-led initiatives under the Johnnie Walker Fund for Women Entrepreneurs in partnership with Senac. Since its inception, the organization has received support from companies such as Vivo and Baterias Moura.

Moreover, the Espaço has established partnerships with Casa Rosângela Rigo, the first municipal public facility dedicated to providing shelter for women experiencing domestic violence. Under Djamila's leadership and vision, the project “Será que é amor?” (“Is it love?”) was launched. This initiative includes a booklet written in accessible language to help women recognize the signs of violence and locate available support, as well as a series of talks designed to raise awareness about how to handle vulnerable or risky situations. The booklet and talks were developed and presented by Brazilian social worker Rosilene Pimentel.

Since its founding, the Espaço has served more than 1,000 women annually through its free support services and has brought together thousands of people at book launches and cultural events.

== Biography ==
=== Early Ears (1980 - 2014) ===
Djamila Ribeiro is the youngest of the four children of Joaquim José Ribeiro dos Santos and Erani Benedita dos Santos Ribeiro. Her father was a dockworker, an activist in the black movement and one of the founders of the Communist Party (PC) in Baixada Santista, who first introduced her to activism; during her childhood, they would go to protests against the privatization of the Port of Santos.

Djamila's mother, a domestic worker, introduced her to Candomblé at the age of eight. Inspired by the Black militant newspaper Jornegro, her father chose the names Djamila ("beauty" in Swahili) and Dara for his daughters. Years later, Djamila followed suit, naming her own daughter Thulane ("the peaceful one" in Swahili), also drawing inspiration from Jornegro.

She spent much of her childhood with her grandmother, Antônia, also devoted to Candomblé and a benzedeira, whom she credits as the primary influence on her spiritual development. Her death in 1993 deeply affected Djamila, who was then 13 years old. This close relationship inspired her most autobiographical work, “Cartas para minha avó” (Letters to my grandmother) published in 2021. In it, the author lovingly revisits their deep affection, acknowledging the enduring strength she carries from her, as well as the meaning of being a black woman in Brazil.

Joaquim and Erani split up during Djamila's teenage years, while her mother was battling cancer for the second time. At that moment, in the face of her father's resistance, Djamila went to work in a street food stand to help with the household expenses.

Soon after, she passed a journalism course at a private university and went on to work as a cleaning assistant in a company, to pay for the private education. At the age of 19, she became involved with the Casa da Cultura da Mulher Negra, a non-governmental organization in São Paulo founded by the poet Alzira Rufino, a great reference in black feminism who also became the first Djamila's reference, as she began to get more deeply involved with issues related to gender and race during the time spent there.

In May 2001, her mother died of kidney cancer. The following year, Joaquim was diagnosed with multiple myeloma, a type of bone marrow cancer that has no cure. He suffered deeply for months at the hospital, while Djamila accompanied the treatment every day.

In the following years, she continued studying journalism until she became pregnant with Thulane at the age of 23. At that time, she was already close with her best friend Flávia Monteiro, who now serves as a judge in Rio Grande do Sul. Due to Ribeiro's circumstances, she decided to leave university to devote herself to her family with Donald Veronico Alves da Silva, a sports project manager in Baixada Santista whom she met at one of the Black Ball events she attended. Donald is the son of Santos Futebol player Abel, and Djamila lived with the Alves da Silva family.

At the age of 27, while she was working as a secretary for the director of a company, she was accepted onto the Philosophy course at the Federal University of São Paulo (Unifesp), on the Guarulhos campus, which was 3.5 hours from Santos. In the first year, Djamila sustained her exhausting routine, divided between work, family and university. But then, despite the disapproval of those around her, she moved to São Paulo—initially to her sister's house and later with Marilia Salles, who became one of her closest friends. There, she began dedicating herself full-time to philosophy, all while making sure to travel to Santos on weekends to see her daughter.

As an undergraduate, an interest in issues of race and gender bloomed within a predominantly white, male, and Eurocentric curriculum. Discovering the Simone de Beauvoir Society online, a group dedicated to the philosopher's work, she submitted an article for evaluation, seeking the intellectual exchange that was rarely found in Brazil at that time. The article's acceptance led to a trip to Eugene University in Oregon, USA, where she was mentored by Margaret A. Simmons, a leading scholar of Beauvoir.

Upon graduating in 2012 at the age of 32, she pursued a master's degree, delving deeper into the thinking of Black researchers. Her advisor was Edson Telles, a philosophy scholar and the son of Amelinha Teles, a renowned Brazilian activist with whom Djamila forged a strong connection. In 2013, her work was accepted for a seminar at the National University of La Plata, and in 2014, she returned for another meeting with the Simone de Beauvoir Society. During this period, Djamila also contributed to Blogueiras Negras (Black Bloggers), a portal addressing issues of concern to Black feminists on the internet.

=== 2015 - 2016 ===
In 2015, a significant connection was forged when Ribeiro met the philosopher, artist, and curator Grada Kilomba during her first visit to São Paulo. At that time, Ribeiro had just begun her role as a columnist for the online publication CartaCapital, and in this interview, Kilomba famously declared, “I want the human freedom to be me”. In the following years, Ribeiro and Kilomba met several times, forging a bond of sisterhood.

In May 2016, Ribeiro was appointment as Deputy Secretary of Human Rights and Citizenship for the city of São Paulo under Mayor Fernando Haddad of the Workers' Party. She held the position for eight months until Haddad lost his re-election campaign. As Deputy Secretary, Ribeiro focused on promoting gender equality and strengthening public policies for the Black population. On a private level, she ended her 13-years relationship.

=== 2017 - 2018 ===
In February 2017, she hosted a season of the program Entrevista, on Canal Futura, where she interviewed, among many other personalities, the then councilwoman Marielle Franco. In the same year, private lessons on gender studies were given to a group of actresses, directors and scriptwriters from TV Globo, the country's largest broadcaster, who were interested in studying the foundations of feminism.

Later, in November of that same year, she published the nationally successful Lugar de Fala (later translated as Where We Stand). The first edition was published by Letramento in partnership with the digital media Justificando, then directed by Brenno Tardelli. The launch event in São Paulo attracted over 1,000 attendees, and the following week, the Rio de Janeiro launch drew more than 3,000 people, with crowds even blocking a street in Lapa. The book, which was a finalist for the 2018 Jabuti Prize in the Humanities category, marked the inauguration of the Plural Feminisms Collection. During the book tour, Ribeiro and Tardelli began dating and later married; they remain together, with Tardelli now serving as her personal producer.

In 2018, she was invited by the government of Norway to learn about the country's gender equity policies, Djamila visited the country. Her second book, “Quem tem medo do feminismo negro?” (Who is Afraid of Black Feminism), was published by Companhia das Letras. On that year, she also participated on Edinburgh International Book Festival, for where she was also one of 51 authors from 25 countries invited to contribute to The Freedom Papers. She also gave a lecture at the Angela Davis Chair for Guest Professors at the Goethe University, in Frankfurt in May and returned in October for the Frankfurt Book Festival.

At the end of that year, the renowned singer Elza Soares released her album Deus é mulher, whose opening track “O que se cala” includes the line “O meu país é o meu lugar de fala.” At the singer's invitation, Ribeiro wrote the album's introductory text.

=== 2019 - 2020 ===
At the beginning of 2019, Ribeiro traveled to the United States, where she delivered a lecture at UC Berkeley and another at Duke University. Upon returning to Brazil, she attended the Planeta Brasil Festival, where Milton “Bituca” Nascimento and Criolo invited her on stage to speak out against the ecological disasters caused by the mining company Vale in Brumadinho, in the interior of Minas Gerais State. This encounter marked the beginning of a friendship and close partnership among Ribeiro, Bituca, and Augustinho Nascimento, the son of the legendary musician.

In March, as part of the French government's Personalities of Tomorrow program, Djamila Ribeiro met French President Emmanuel Macron at the Elysée Palace and engaged with French and European parliamentarians as well as women's rights activists. Throughout the year, she participated in 174 public events on three continents, a fact she highlighted in several interviews.

In May 2019, Djamila embarked on her first book tour in France with her editor, Paula Anacaona. During this tour, the two established a strong partnership, and all of Djamila's works in France—having already sold over 15,000 copies—were published by Éditions Anacaona. The tour, centered on the French translation of Lugar de Fala (La place de la parole noir), featured events in Paris, Rennes, Montpellier, Toulouse, Brussels, and Lille.

In June 2019, as noted in the Media section, she began writing a weekly column for Folha de São Paulo. Later, in July, Ribeiro signed the introduction of Grada Kilomba's Illusions exposition at the Pinacoteca of São Paulo. Then, in November 2019, she published the Pequeno Manual Antirracista (Small Anti-Racist Handbook), which later became Brazil's best-selling book in 2020.

In December 2019, recognition came with the Prince Claus Award - one of the highest honors bestowed by the Kingdom of the Netherlands. Djamila spent a week in the Netherlands attending the ceremony events, including engagements with the Royal family. Additionally, she spent a week in South Carolina serving as a Guest Professor at South Carolina University's Maxcy's College.

With the pandemic, Djamila's presence on social media was strengthened. In partnership with the late Brazilian comedian Paulo Gustavo, the first Brazilian occupation was made on Instagram pages; Paulo Gustavo gave up his Instagram as a platform for Djamila to bring the feminist and racial debate to his 13 million followers. Together, they did a live transmission that marked the beginning of the “Juntos pela Transformação” (Together for Transformation) project, which promoted social collectives in all Brazil's regions. Also on that year, she was the laureate author at Lima Book Festival, side to the poet Nélida Piñon. She also gave a lecture at the University of Iowa.

=== 2021 - 2022 ===
By the invitation of the Electoral Court of Justice, presided over by Minister Luís Roberto Barroso, the philosopher took part in a national campaign in favor of electronic ballot systems in June 2021, in the midst of a heated debate about the security of this voting system. The questioning of its effectiveness was led mainly by the Brazilian extreme right. In the same year, she was invited by the COB (Brazilian Olympic Committee) to promote a mandatory anti-racism course for the Brazilian delegation to Tokyo. The initiative was exported to other Committees in South America.

During the second semester, Djamila Ribeiro released her book Cartas para minha avó. The launch was promoted on her Instagram page through a live chat featuring Margareth Menezes, Lilia Schwarcz, Regina Casé, Taís Araújo, Camila Pitanga, Teresa Cristina, among others. In addition, she became the first Brazilian to receive the BET Awards.

It was also during this period that the book Dialogue transatlantique: perspectives de la pensée féministe noire et des diasporas africaines was launched. Published by Éditions Anacaona (and by the Brazilian publisher Bazar do Tempo in 2025), the work compiles a series of dialogues between Djamila Ribeiro and Nadia Yala Kisukidi, a professor of philosophy at the University of Paris 8.

In 2022, she attended the Hay Festival Cartagena and participated in UNESCO’s Mondiacult 2022 in Mexico City, as a guest of the Kingdom of the Netherlands and the Mexican government, where she delivered a lecture on transformations in global book translation policy. In May, she hosted a conversation with Chimamanda Ngozi Adichie in Rio de Janeiro. More than 3,000 tickets were sold in less than ten minutes, as the meeting between the two thinkers unfolded in a relationship of mutual admiration.

Since this year, Ribeiro has been an immortal at the São Paulo Academy of Letters. She occupies chair number 28, previously held by the writer Lygia Fangundes Telles, who died on April 3, at the age of 98. At the induction ceremony, the rhythm of the atabaques from Djamila's Candomblé terreiro carried through the evening. She is the second black woman to occupy a seat on the APL.

At invitation of Milton Nascimento and Djavan, Djamila wrote the review for the song “Beleza Destruída,” composed by Djavan and musically arranged by both artists. In 2022, Ribeiro received the highest honor granted by the city of Santos—the Braz Cubas Medal of Honor for Merit. In 2022, Ribeiro received the highest honor granted by the city of Santos - the Braz Cubas Medal of Honor for Merit granted by the city counselors Chico do Settaport e Débora Camilo.

=== 2023 - 2024 ===
In 2023, the philosopher became the first Brazilian to speak at the UN General Assembly's Day of Remembrance for the Abolition of Slavery and the Transatlantic Slave Trade, a flagship event in the fight against racism. In Brazil, she was the highlight of Mangueira Samba School's carnival parade. She participated in the Bogotá Book Fair and the Buenos Aires Independent Publishers Fair. Additionally, she spent two weeks on a book tour in Italy, launching her works published by Capovolte Edizioni, directed by Ilaria Leccardi.

In July 2023, Djamila Ribeiro was invited to the Jardins de Verão Gulbenkian (Summer Gardens Gulbenkian) in Lisbon, where her presentation broke all previous audience records—so much so that impromptu adaptations and live cinema hall broadcasts became necessary. Later that year, she met film director Nicole Gullane, an encounter that sparked the idea for a documentary about her life and work. Subsequently, Djamila joined the community of the Candomblé terreiro Ilé Àse Olùwáiyè Ni Oya, which is led by Mãe Márcia de Obaluayê.

In 2024, Djamila Ribeiro and Nicole Gullane began shooting the documentary. That same year, Djamila was involved in several significant projects in Brazil. She participated in teacher training sessions with public school educators and was featured at the Santos samba school União Imperial, even appearing in the school's samba-enredo alongside Alzira Rufino. Additionally, she delivered the keynote lecture at the Universidade do Estado da Bahia during the launch of the play adaptation of Pequeno Manual Antirracista.

Ribeiro was also appointed as a board member for several prestigious cultural and academic institutions in Brazil, including Fundação Padre Anchieta, the Pinacoteca do Estado de São Paulo, and the University of São Paulo Endowment Fund.

In the first semester, she attended both the Lisbon Book Fair and the Nairobi Book Fair. While in Portugal, she was received at the Saramago Foundation by Pilar Del Rio and went on to launch the translation of Cartas para Minha Avó through the publisher Caminho. Notably, her editor is Zeferino Coelho, the same editor responsible for José Saramago's works.

In November 2024, while she was in New York City for her second semester, Djamila Ribeiro spent a week in Araraquara, in the interior of São Paulo, where she was honored as the featured writer at the Feira Literária da Morada do Sol. During the event, she reconnected with Brazilian writer Ignácio de Loyola Brandão, the patron of the fair and one of her key references. The two authors have developed a relationship of mutual support since Ribeiro's nomination to the São Paulo Academy of Letters.

As the documentary, the film is scheduled for release in 2026.

== Awards and honors ==
  - Trip Transformadores Award, in 2017.
  - Dandara dos Palmares Award, in 2017.
  - Best Columnist, Trophy Women in Press, in 2018.
  - Indication to Jabuti Prize, in 2018, on category Humanities, for the book "O que é Lugar de fala?".
  - Prince Claus Award, in 2019, category Philosophy, granted by the Dutch Ministry of Foreign Affairs.
  - Recognition as "Personality of Tomorrow" by the French govern, in 2019.
  - Jabuti Award, in 2020, category Essay, with the book "Pequeno Manual Antirracista"
  - Sim à Igualdade Racial Award, in 2020, category Race on the Agenda.
  - Laureate BET Awards, in 2021, category Global Good, becoming the first Brazilian to win the award.
  - Inclusion in the BBC's list of the 100 most influential and inspiring women in the world
  - Election to the Paulista Academy of Letters in May 2022, occupying chair number 28.
  - Recognition with the Franco-German Prize for Human Rights and the Rule of Law in 2022, awarded by the Foreign Ministers of France and Germany.
  - These awards highlight the philosopher's work both nationally and internationally, while crediting Ribeiro as a highly influential voice in the contemporary debates of race and gender.

== Publications and major concepts ==
=== Where We Stand ===
Launched in 2017 and translated into English in 2024, the book aims to demystify the concept of Speaking Place and contextualizes the individual seen as universal in a Eurocentric patriarchal society, so that it is possible to identify the various experiences that are frequently uncontemplated and thus differentiate discourses according to the social position from which one speaks. She discusses the Speaking Place of black women, who have been silenced a lot, especially in the face of (universalizing) feminist agendas.

=== Quem Tem Medo do Feminismo Negro? (Who is afraid of black feminism?) ===
This book combines an autobiographical essay with articles originally published in Carta Capital. The author begins by exploring her experiences of silencing and erasure during childhood and adolescence, a process that continued until she encountered authors who instilled pride in her heritage. She then engages in a dialogue with writers like Chimamanda Ngozi Adichie, bell hooks, Sueli Carneiro, Alice Walker, Toni Morrison, and Conceição Evaristo. Through these conversations, concepts such as female empowerment and intersectionality emerge, alongside discussions of racial politics and the origins of Black feminism in both Brazil and the United States. Published in 2018.

=== Pequeno Manual Antirracista (Little Anti-Racist Handbook) ===
The book deals with themes that serve to deepen the perception of structural and deep-rooted racist discrimination, making it possible to contribute to the transformation of society, based on the privilege conferred on each person. In eleven chapters, it presents, in a didactic way, strategies and actions suitable for seeking the elimination of racism, as well as other forms of oppression. It was published in 2019 and was the best selling book in Brazil in the year of 2020.

=== Dialogue transatlantique: Perspectives de la pensée féministe noire et des diasporas africaines (Transatlantic Dialogue: Perspectives on Black Feminist Thought and African Diasporas) ===
Published in 2021, this work compiles a series of dialogues between Djamila Ribeiro and Nadia Yala Kisukidi, a professor of philosophy at the University of Paris 8. The book explores the intersections of race, gender, and culture through the lens of Black feminist thought and the experiences of African diasporas, offering a transatlantic perspective on contemporary social challenges and feminist theory. Published by Éditions Anacaona (and later by Bazar do Tempo in Brazil), the work has been recognized for its critical insights and its contribution to broadening the discussion on Black feminism and its global impact.

=== Cartas para minha avó (Letters to my grandmother) 2021 ===
“Letters to my grandmother” is her most personal work, as the author revisits moments from her childhood and adolescence to discuss black ancestry and the challenges presented for the black population. Djamila also touches on themes such as love relationships and professional experiences, while deepening her comprehension of the women around her, as well as realizing the importance of the struggles and achievements of black people who came before to encourage current struggles.

== Other ==
- "Conditions of Amefricanity" in The Women Writers Handbook, London: Aurora Metro Books, 2020, ISBN 978-1-912430-33-8
