= Mundo Estranho =

Brazilian teen magazine

- Editor: Fabio Volpe
- Frequency: Monthly
- Circulation: nearly 130,000
- First issue: November 2001
- Final issue: August 2018
- Company: Editora Abril
- Country: Brazil
- Language: Portuguese
- Website: mundoestranho.abril.com.br (last version archived)

Mundo Estranho (literally "Strange World" in Portuguese), first issued November 2001, was a monthly diversities and fun facts magazine, very popular among Brazilian teenagers and one of the country's most popular magazine of its type. It started as a section in the more popular Superinteressante magazine, but was already a separate paperback a few months after its first issue, later converted to a full-fledged separate magazine.

== As a section in Superinteressante (2001–2002) ==
During its first two years, the magazine was a special issue from Superinteressante, an influential scientific magazine in Brazil. Mundo Estranho's content was more scientific. The magazine's team worked together with Superinteressante's team. With Mundo Estranho's popularity rising up, the Superinteressante's chief-editors decided to separate a special team exclusively for it, and publish it as an independent magazine. Some modifications were made with the magazine's structure and its logo.

== As a separate magazine (2002–2018) ==
With a separate team and very popular for its use of informal language and good relationship with the readers, instead of exclusively scientifically-correct articles, Mundo Estranho now featured curiosities about music, video games and movies, and answers reader questions.

On August 6, 2018, Editora Abril announced the discontinuation of the magazine, along with nine more titles.

In October 2022, Editora Abril, in partnership with Disney, launched a special edition of the magazine to promote the animated film Strange World. This limited edition brought information about the characters, production, cast, and plot of the movie and was distributed only in some theaters in São Paulo and Rio de Janeiro.

== Sections ==
After its 70th issue (December 2007), Mundo Estranho made small modifications to its structure. The sections are as follows:

- Caixa de Correio: a section with letters from the magazine's readers
- Presentão da Mundo Estranho (literally Mundo Estranho's Big Gift): magazine's sales promotions
- ME Digital: two pages with news from the magazine's website and readers' best comments in the magazine's social networks and sales promotions for mobile phones, smartphones, books and video games
- Duel: it is a competition between any two subjects. The magazine's team establishes five topics for each duel and compares the weak and the strong points, later deciding who wins, with the possibility of a tie. Some fights featuring famous characters or franchises were partially voted by the readers, like Harry Potter X The Lord of the Rings, Gandalf X Professor Dumbledore, Bill Gates X Carlos Slim and X-Men X The Avengers
- Super-Career: this is a bimonthly topic which is alternated with the topic "Interchange". It shows a description of uncommon jobs (like "grave digger") and gives hints to help the reader to follow these careers
- Interchange: this is a bimonthly topic which is alternated with the topic "Super-Career". It describes life in remote countries, like Mauritania, Bangladesh or Bulgaria.
- Top 10: a list of ten items about any topic, like "The 10 Richest Teenagers in the World" or "The 10 Most Notorious Serial-Killers"
- Perguntas e Resposta: it is the magazine's largest section, usually with more than 20 pages. It contains a series of questions sent by the readers, like "How is a pencil made?", "How does the Vacuum Bomb works?" or "What is the biggest star in the Universe?"
  - Curto e Grosso (literally Portuguese for "short and thick": short questions and short answers
  - As clássicas: common questions whose answers are not commonly known, like "How were the Egyptian Pyramids made?"
- The Book is on the Table: about books
- Tech: the latest news about technology
- Games: as the title says, its only about games and their famous "cheat codes"
- Cinema e TV: curiosities about movies and TV programs
- Contando Ninguém Acredita: Unusual stories from around the world

== Mundo Estranho Hot ==
ME Hot is a division of Mundo Estranho. It follows the same structure as the main magazine, but with questions and curiosities only about sex. It was created after some criticised articles about sex in Mundo Estranho's articles, so the magazine's team decided to create a separate division for that purpose and exclude all the articles about sex from Mundo Estranho.
