= Guia do Estudante =

Brazilian education magazine

- Categories: Education
- Frequency: Monthly
- First issue: 1984
- Company: Grupo Abril
- Country: Brazil
- Based in: São Paulo
- Language: Portuguese
- Website: guiadoestudante.abril.com.br

Guia do Estudante (The Student Guide) was a Brazilian education magazine.

== History ==
The magazine was launched in 1984, as a special edition of Almanaque Abril.

Guia do Estudante publications include booklets on subjects in the Brazilian curriculum, magazines about entrance exams including ENEM and FUVEST, and a summary of current affairs. Guia do Estudante also organizes an annual fair that brings together universities and events aimed at future Brazilian higher education students.
