= CMT Brasil =

- Country: Brazil
- Broadcast area: Brazil

Ownership
- Owner: Gaylord Entertainment Company; Grupo Abril

History
- Launched: 1 July 1995
- Closed: March 2001
- Replaced by: MC - MusicCountry

Country Music Television (CMT) was a Brazilian cable television channel focused on country music owned by Viacom and Grupo Abril. The channel ceased broadcasting in March 2001 and was replaced by MusicCountry.

== History ==
The channel started broadcasting in July 1995. It was initially a joint venture between Gaylord Entertainment Company and Grupo Abril. As a promotional action to promote the new channel, TVA brought a truck from Texas that toured the states of São Paulo, Rio de Janeiro, Paraná, Minas Gerais and Goiás.

On 25 March 1996, CMT Brasil aired its first national-produced show, CMT Rodeio, produced in association with TV Rodeio. The channel's programming was composed of music videos, interviews, and performances with national and international artists connected to the country and sertanejo genres, as well as coverage of related events, such as the Cowboy Festival of Barretos and shows about lifestyle. Some of the shows aired by the channel were Top 12 Countdown, Cantarolando, Celebrity VJ Hour and A Hora do Cachorro Louco.

Gaylord Entertainment Company sold CMT US operations to CBS in 1997, retaining international channels. In 1998, the partnership with TVA was ended, also breaking an exclusive distribution deal with the operator.

In 1999, the channel became available on NET and SKY. At the end of that year, the channel's programming director, Marcelo Coltro, announced changes, making room for new musical genres, such as axé and pagode, and affirming CMT as a channel focused on the country lifestyle, not merely a music television channel.

The channel ceased broadcasting in March 2001 and was replaced by MC - MusicCountry, a generalist music channel aimed at the adult audience.

== See also ==
- CMT (American TV channel)
