= Muy Interesante =

Monthly popular science magazine in Spain

- Categories: Science and technology magazine
- Frequency: Monthly
- Publisher: Grupo G+J España Ediciones, S.L.
- Total circulation (2009): 208,880
- Founded: 1981; 44 years ago
- Company: Grupo G+J España Ediciones, S.L.
- Country: Spain
- Based in: Madrid
- Language: Spanish
- Website: www.muyinteresante.es
- ISSN: 1130-4081

Muy Interesante ('Very Interesting') is a monthly popular science magazine which deals with fun facts and current events, such as the development of nanotechnology, physics, biology, astronomy, genetics, neurosciences, new investigations and inventions, and world affairs.

== History and profile ==
Muy Interesante was first published in May 1981. The owner and publisher of the magazine is Grupo G+J España Ediciones, S.L., a subsidiary of the German media company Bertelsmann. The magazine is published monthly. The headquarters of the magazine is in Madrid.

The magazine is also published in Mexico (Editorial Televisa); Argentina (Editorial Televisa, 1986); Colombia (Editorial Cinco); and as Super Interessante in Brazil (Editora Abril, 1987), Portugal (Edimpresa Editora, 1998) and Chile (Editorial Lord Cochrane, 1987).

== Circulation ==
The circulation of Muy Interesante was 284,284 copies in 1993, making it the tenth best-selling magazine in Spain. In 1997 the magazine sold 282,155 copies. The average circulation of the monthly was 267,442 in 2003 and 259,545 copies in 2004. It was the sixth best-selling Spanish magazine in 2005 with a circulation of 258,297 copies.

Muy Interesante sold 208,880 copies in 2009.

== See also ==
- List of magazines in Spain
