= Stephen Kanitz =

Brazilian business consultant and academic (1946–2025)

Stephen Charles Kanitz
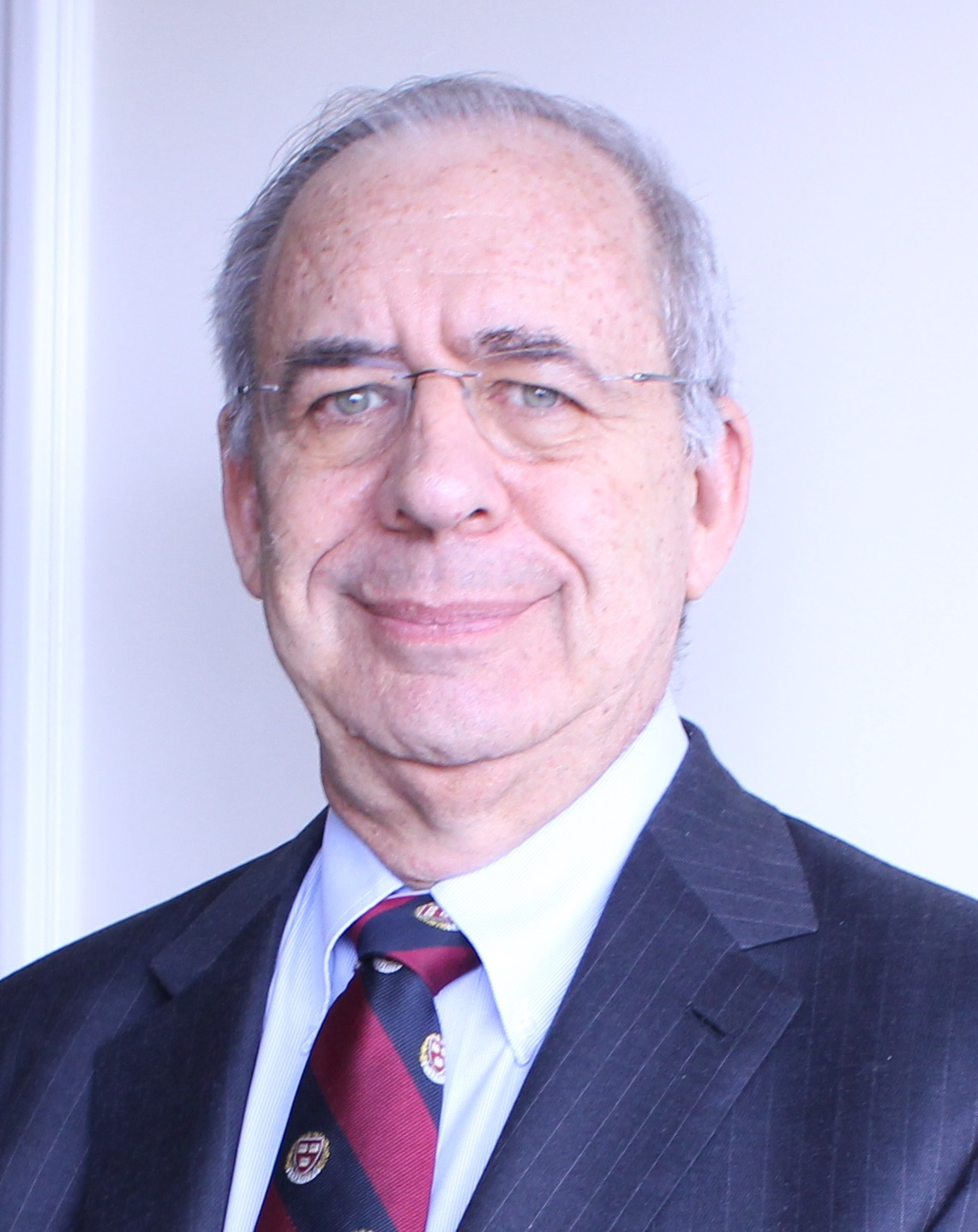
- Born: 31 January 1946; São Paulo, São Paulo, Brazil
- Died: 24 November 2025 (aged 79); São Paulo, São Paulo, Brazil
- Education: Harvard Business School
- Known for: Kanitz Thermometer
- Scientific career
- Fields: Venture Capital, Private Equity
- Workplaces: University of São Paulo

Stephen Charles Kanitz (31 January 1946 – 24 November 2025) was a Brazilian business consultant, lecturer, academic and writer.

== Academic life ==
Kanitz held a D.Sc. in Accounting from University of São Paulo, Master's degree in Business Administration from Harvard Business School and bachelor's degree in accounting from the University of São Paulo, where he held a Professorship, as Full Professor.

== Professional life ==
In 1974, Kanitz helped introduce credit scoring in Brazil, in a famous article Como Prever Falências, helping higher risk and poorer people access to bank credit.

In 1975, he created the annual award for the Best Run Company of Brazil, Melhores e Maiores for Revista Exame, initiating a movement that became known as benchmarking, just as Tom Peters did with his American 1981 book 'In Search of Excellence'.

In 1992, he was one of the leaders in Brazil for Social Responsibility, creating the first site for volunteer work, www.voluntarios.com.br. He also created one of the first sites in the world for internet charity donations, www.filantropia.org.

In 1994, he created the Best Run Charity Award, the Prêmio Bem Eficiente, that every year awards the best 50 best run charities of Brazil.

== Personal life and death ==
Kanitz belonged to the Anglican Church of São Paulo. He died on 24 November 2025, at the age of 79.

== Books ==
Kanitz was the author of Brazil: The Emerging Economic Boom 1995-2005 (ISBN 0070340846), which won the Jabuti Prize of 1995 in non-fiction, and periodically wrote for Veja magazine. He wrote 13 books.

Família acima de tudo was launched in Brazil in December 2009 (ISBN 9788578600631).

He was also co-author of Contabilidade Introdutória, which has sold 5 million copies, and is the leading textbook in accounting.

Other books include:

- Controladoria
- O Parecer do Auditor
- Os 50 Melhores Artigos
- Ponto de Vista, with Roberto Campos.
