= Maria Inês Nassif =

Brazilian journalist

- Occupation: Journalist
- Known for: Communications adviser to president Lula, 2012.

Maria Inês Nassif is a Brazilian journalist. In her professional career, she has been associated with several media outlets, such as Valor Econômico and GGN, usually in the fields of politics and the economy. In recognition of her work as a reporter at the GGN, she was awarded the Woman Press Trophy (Troféu Mulher Imprensa) in the category "Reporter for News Sites" in the year 2014.

In 2012, she was the communications advisor to the Brazilian President Luiz Inácio Lula da Silva.

She graduated in journalism at the Cásper Líbero College in 1978 and holds a master's degree in Social Sciences from the Pontifical Catholic University of São Paulo (2005), for her dissertation "Newspapers, Democracy and the Market Dictatorship: Coverage of the Presidential Elections of 2002".

Her brother is a Brazilian journalist, columnist and member of the editorial board of Folha de S. Paulo, Luís Nassif.
