= Galileu =

Science magazine in Brazil

- Editor: Luís Alberto Nogueira
- Categories: Science magazine
- Frequency: Monthly
- Founded: 1991
- Company: Editora Globo
- Country: Brazil
- Based in: São Paulo
- Language: Portuguese
- Website: Galileu
- ISSN: 1415-9856

Galileu is a science magazine in Brazil, which was founded in 1991. The magazine is owned by Editora Globo. Galileu was first called "Globo Ciência" (in English "Globo Science"). The current magazine is named after Galileo Galilei, or Galileu Galilei, in Portuguese. It is a competitor of Superinteressante, another science and technology magazine. In 1998, Globo Ciência published its 86th edition and, from then on, changed its name to Galileu. The first issue's topics centered on robots.

The headquarters of the magazine which is published on a monthly basis is in São Paulo. The magazine mostly features articles on technology, research, environment, health and culture.
