= Quatro Rodas =

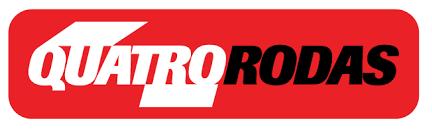
- Editor: Paulo Campo Grande
- Categories: Automobile
- Frequency: Monthly
- Publisher: Editora Abril
- Founded: 1960
- Country: Brazil
- Language: Portuguese
- Website: quatrorodas.abril.com.br
- ISSN: 0033-5908

Quatro Rodas (English: Four Wheels) is an automotive monthly magazine from Brazil, published by Editora Abril. Its debut issue was released in August 1960.

== History ==
The magazine was launched by Italian-Brazilian journalists Mino Carta and Victor Civita, with Civita being the founder and then general director of Editora Abril.

The concept for the publication emerged from the increasing interest of Brazilians in automobiles during the 1950s. It aimed to offer readers detailed technical insights into vehicles available on the market, alongside coverage of the emerging Brazilian automotive industry and international automotive industries, many of which were undergoing major transformations and expansion during that period. The magazine's first test drive took place in 1961, featuring the DKW Belcar.

In the following decades, Quatro Rodas became one of the most influential automotive magazines in Latin America. It closely tracked the growth and transformation of the automotive sector in Brazil and neighboring countries.

The magazine's team documented historical milestones in the automotive world, such as the popularization of the Volkswagen Beetle, the launch of iconic vehicles in the South American market, and innovations in automotive safety and technology.

With the rise of the internet in the 2000s, the magazine expanded its presence into the digital realm, offering content on its official website and social media platforms. In 2010, a digital archive containing all previous issues was made available to subscribers. Though temporarily discontinued, it was reintroduced in 2023.

== Magazine content ==
The magazine provides exclusive reviews, videos, and interactive comparisons to complement its print content, including the renowned long-term test, where a vehicle is driven over 60,000 km (37,282 miles) under real-world conditions.

Each monthly issue features a diverse range of topics, such as:

- Performance Tests and Comparisons: In-depth assessments of models on the market, covering performance, fuel consumption, safety, and value for money.
- Industry News and Launches: Insights from major automotive events, including the São Paulo International Motor Show and international vehicle debuts.
- Consumer Buying Guides: Expert advice tailored to various buyer needs, focusing on both new and used vehicles.
- Classic Automotive Stories: Tributes to iconic cars that shaped automotive history in Brazil and beyond.
- Innovation and Sustainability: Reports on emerging automotive technologies, alternative fuels, and safety advancements.
- Travel and Lifestyle: Road trip ideas, travel guides, and practical tips for travelers and driving enthusiasts.

== Achievements ==
In the 1980's, the magazine was at the forefront of discussing the impact of the brazilian government actions on the automotive sector, including the Proálcool program and emissions regulations. In 2000, Quatro Rodas became the first magazine in Brazil to conduct a crash test involving four popular vehicles sold at the time, including the Fiat Palio. The test revealed a significant safety issue with the Palio's seatbelt latch, leading Fiat to issue an extensive recall across Brazil.

== Controversy ==
In 2016, Quatro Rodas faced criticism from the Superintendence of Private Insurance (Portuguese: Superintendência de Seguros Privados, SUSEP), the Brazilian regulatory body linked to the Ministry of Finance, after publishing a report about vehicle protection plans, claiming they could be up to 70% cheaper than traditional car insurance. SUSEP stated that these practices are illegal under Brazilian law, lack financial guarantees, and could mislead readers into confusing them with authorized insurance. In a statement, SUSEP’s superintendent, Roberto Westenberger, emphasised that the magazine should clarify the risks highlighted in the report. He noted that SUSEP sought to ensure the public was properly informed, and expected that any misunderstandings regarding the legality and reliability of these vehicle protection plans would be thoroughly addressed.

== Gallery ==
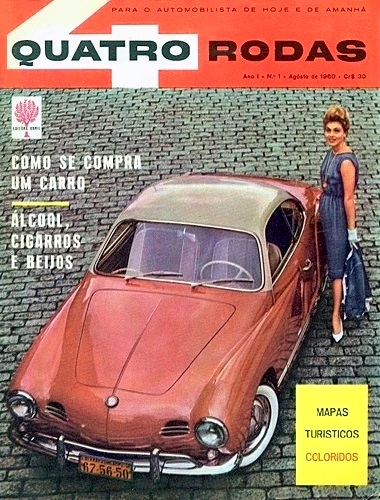
The debut issue of Quatro Rodas, August 1960.
