= Cesar Calejon =

Brazilian journalist and writer

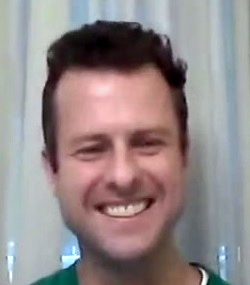
- Born: Cesar Antonio Calejon Ibrahim
- Alma mater: University of São Paulo; Fundação Getulio Vargas; São Marcos University
- Occupation: Journalist, writer

Cesar Antonio Calejon Ibrahim (born 11 July 1979) is a Brazilian journalist and writer. Since the general elections in Brazil in 2018, he has been a critic of Jair Bolsonaro and the movement known as “Bolsonarism”, having written several books on the subject. He also participated in debates on TV and radio, especially in Grupo Jovem Pan, where he became embroiled in some controversies with other commentators.

The journalist has contributed as a columnist to the newsmagazine CartaCapital, the Trip magazine and portal Brasil 247.

Calejon has a specialisation in International Relations from the Getulio Vargas Foundation and a master's degree in Social Change and Political Participation from the University of São Paulo.

== Books ==
- 2019: A Ascensão do Bolsonarismo no Brasil do Século XXI
- 2021: Tempestade Perfeita: o bolsonarismo e a sindemia covid-19 no Brasil
- 2022: Sobre perdas e danos: negacionismo, lawfare e neofascismo no Brasil
- 2023: Esfarrapados: Como o elitismo histórico-cultural moldou as desigualdades no Brasil
