= CartaCapital =

Brazilian news magazine

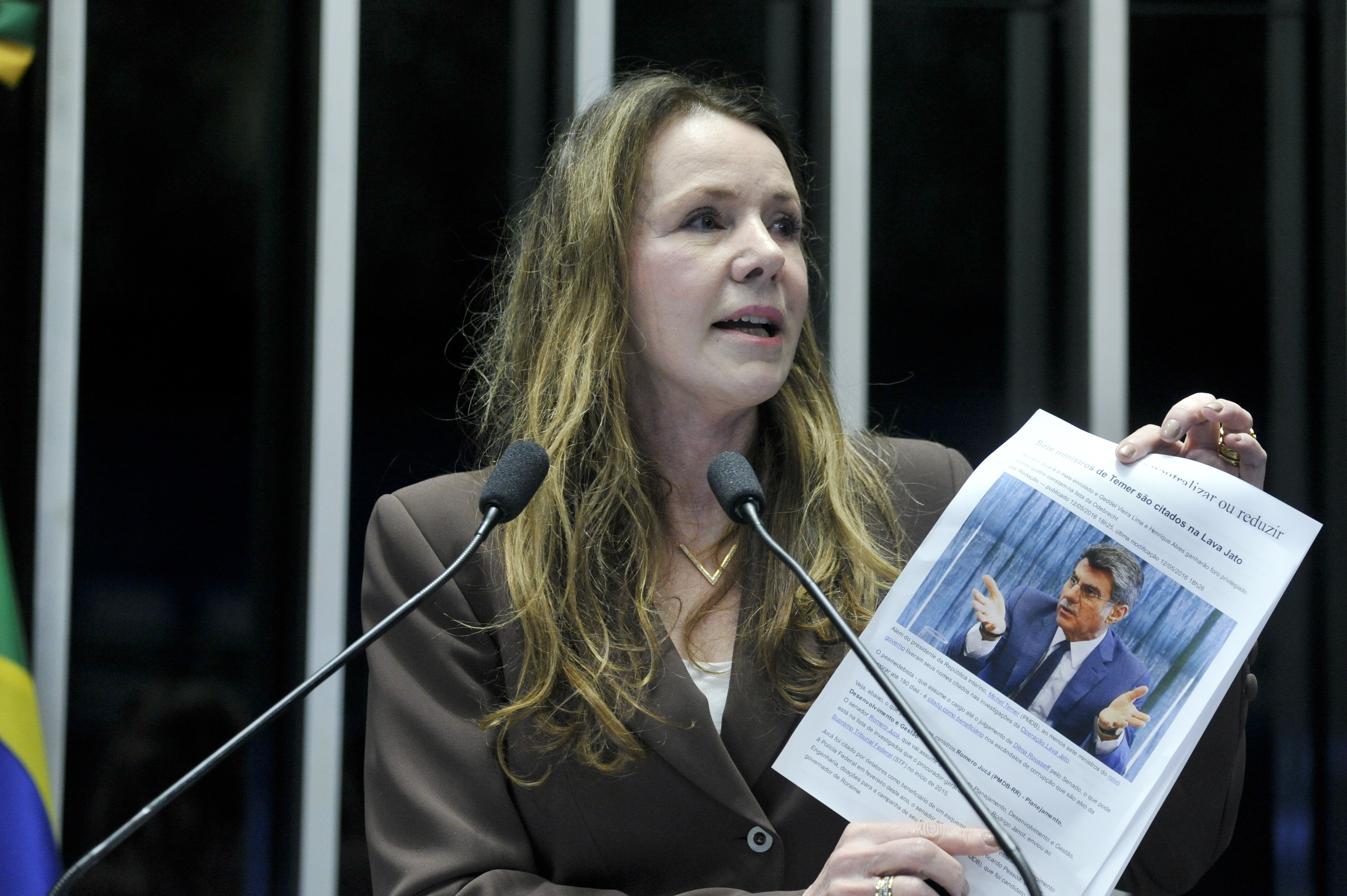
- Senator Vanessa Grazziotin shows printed material from Carta Capital magazine.
- Editor: Mino Carta
- Categories: Politics, economy
- Frequency: Weekly
- Publisher: Editora Basset
- Paid circulation: 2.919 (2021)
- First issue: August 1994
- Country: Brazil
- Based in: Santana de Parnaíba, São Paulo
- Language: Portuguese
- Website: www.cartacapital.com.br

CartaCapital is a weekly Brazilian newsmagazine published in Santana de Parnaíba, São Paulo and João Pessoa, Paraíba and distributed throughout the country by Editora Basset. The main focuses of the magazine are politics, economy, social issues and culture.

== History ==
CartaCapital was created as a monthly magazine in 1994 by Mino Carta, an Italo-Brazilian journalist. In 1968, Carta founded Brazil's leading newsmagazine Veja alongside Victor Civita. Eight years later, he founded IstoÉ, another popular newsmagazine. Unsatisfied with the result of the magazines he helped to create, Carta founded CartaCapital as an alternative to these. CartaCapital is noted for its small crew; it only has eleven journalists.

The magazine was published on a monthly until 1996 when its frequency was switched to biweekly. Its frequency was changed to weekly in 2002. The magazine is known for supporting causes such as both of Luiz Inácio Lula da Silva's candidacies, the legalization of abortion in all cases, the maintenance of the current age of criminal responsibility and the extradition of Cesare Battisti to Italy, among other polemic issues. Carta argues that the magazine does it to avoid hiding in a curtain of impartiality and not being honest to its readers.

CartaCapital is a declared left-wing publication but has in its staff Antonio Delfim Netto, Minister of Economy during the right-wing military dictatorship. Besides his participation in a right-wing government, Antonio Delfim Netto is a Keynesian.

The magazine openly supported Dilma Rousseff's government, although the article in which Mino Carta put and explained his position was later removed without notice.

CartaCapital also publishes an educational magazine titled Carta na Escola on a monthly basis. It is dedicated to teachers, advising them on how to discuss the news with their students.

== Recent circulation history ==
Year	2015	2016	2017	2018	2019	2020	2021
Total circulation	21,877	N/A	17,139	26,709	N/A	17,039	2,919

== Notable contributors ==
- Márcio Alemão
- Paulo Henrique Amorim
- Nirlando Beirão
- Cesar Calejon
- Wálter Fanganiello Maierovitch
- Antônio Delfim Netto
- José Onofre
- Sócrates
- Pedro Alexandre Sanches
- Ana Paula Sousa
- Drauzio Varella
- Thomaz Wood Jr.
- Maurício Dias
- Jean Wyllys
- Vladimir Safatle
- Djamila Ribeiro
