= Sistema Anglo de Ensino =

Brazilian educational system company

- Industry: Education
- Founded: 1950
- Founder: Antônio Guerreiro

Sistema Anglo de Ensino is a Brazilian educational system and company comprehending elementary and high schools, cursinhos and a higher education institute, FIPEN (Instituto Paulista de Ensino, translated as São Paulo Teaching Institute). The company uses a lion as its logo, representing strength.

Anglo's cursinhos (Anglo Vestibulares) are perhaps the reason of its popularity and notability. In 2005, 30% of the students who managed to enter in the University of São Paulo (whose vestibular FUVEST is considered one of the most difficult and competitive of Brazil) studied at Anglo, the highest percentage among other cursinhos.

== History ==
In 1894, Portuguese educator Antônio Guerreiro founded in São Paulo the Professor Guerreiro Gymnasium, renamed Anglo-Latin Gymnasium after the Second World War in honour of the Allies.

After the Constitutionalist Revolution of 1932, Celestino Rodrigues, a student of the Polytechnical School of the University of São Paulo, and Leo Bonfim, a teacher of the same school, started a cursinho called Anglo-Latin Course.

In the late 1930s, when Guerreiro died, his heirs sold the gymnasium to Leo, Celestino and other professors, who expanded the place and opened the Anglo-Latin School.

In 1950, Leo and Celestino decided to close and sell the gymnasium to pursue engineering careers. Simão Faiguenboim, a teacher who served as a principal for Anglo Course since the end of World War II, then invited fellow teachers Emílio Gabriades and Abram Bloch to continue the activities in Colégio São Paulo de Piratininga. Carlos Marmo, a drawing teacher, joined the trio.

Anglo then created its first fascicles, "simulados" (lit. "simulated", non-official tests simulating a vestibular) and the "O Anglo Resolve" (Anglo Solves), a publication with the resolutions and comments of the main vestibulares. In the 1960s, Mathematics teacher Cid Guelli entered Anglo. In the next decade, Anglo, which initially focuses in the area of exact sciences, expanded its activities to cover the areas of humanities and biological sciences.

In the early 1980s, the first textbooks by Anglo were produced for high schools that established a partnership with the company, and a second unity in Sergipe Street was built. The third unity opened in João Dias Avenue in the 1990s, and material for kindergarten and elementary school began to be produced.

In 2010, Sistema Anglo de Ensino was bought by Grupo Abril.

== Units ==
Nowadays, there are other unities spread all over Brazil, mostly in the state of São Paulo. Many schools have also adopted their educational system, eventually changing its name. For a comprehensive list of all units, see List of schools and cursinhos working under Sistema Anglo de Ensino.
