= Miguel Ángel Bustos =

Argentine poet and journalist

Miguel Angel Bustos
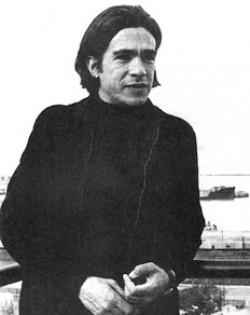
- Born: August 31, 1932; Buenos Aires, Argentina
- Disappeared: May 30, 1976
- Died: June 20, 1976 (aged 43); Buenos Aires, Argentina
- Occupations: Poet, journalist, visual artist
- Spouse: Iris Alba

Miguel Angel Ramón Bustos (Buenos Aires, August 31, 1932 – Buenos Aires, June 20, 1976) was an Argentine poet, journalist and plastic artist. He was kidnapped by the Argentine military dictatorship on May 30, 1976.

== Biography ==
Miguel Angel Bustos was born in Buenos Aires, Argentina, on August 31, 1932, the eldest of four children. His maternal grandfather, Carlos von Jöcker, influenced his early interest in literature and poetry. After completing his secondary studies in 1951, he entered the Faculty of Philosophy and Letters at the University of Buenos Aires, where he devoted himself to studying several languages, including English, French, Portuguese, and Italian.

In 1957 he published his first book of poems, Cuatro murales, un óleo, followed by "Corazón de piel afuera" two years later, with a prologue by the poet Juan Gelman. Between 1960 and 1963 he made an extensive trip to northern Argentina, Brazil, Bolivia, and Peru, which left a deep mark on his later work. His return to Buenos Aires in 1964 was followed by a brief marriage, a suicide attempt, and a stay of almost a year in the Neuropsychiatric Hospital "José T. Borda", where he met the surrealist poet Jacobo Fijman, who influenced his own poetry.

In 1965 Miguel Ángel Bustos published Fragmentos fantásticos, largely written at the Bermann neuropsychiatric clinic in Córdoba. Around that time, drawing began to occupy in his life a space as important as poetry, so much so that four of his books of poems are illustrated by himself.He attended the drawing workshop of Juan Batlle Planas and was part of the mythical surrealist circle created by Aldo Pellegrini and Enrique Pichon-Rivière. He also established a teacher-disciple relationship with Leopoldo Marechal, who prefaced his new book Visión de los hijos del mal (1969), calling Bustos "mystic in a wild state". For this work, Miguel Angel received the Second Municipal Poetry Prize. In 1970 he published his book El Himalaya o la Moral de los Pájaros (The Himalayas or the Moral of the Birds) thanks to a scholarship granted by the Fondo Nacional de las Artes. The launching of the book coincided with his first drawing and painting exhibition at the Sociedad Argentina de Artistas Plásticos.

In an interview by Alicia Dujovne Ortiz with Miguel Angel Bustos for La Nación entitled Y la doble red, the journalist asks him if the images of his poetry also appear "all at once, already constructed, dictated". Miguel Angel answers:

"Yes, I wrote El Himalaya in one go, with the same sense of certainty. And it is also a poetry with the ambiguous sense that Rimbaud gave to the word 'illumination': at once illumination of the spirit and painting."

In an interview with Bengt Oldenburg for Análisis magazine, Miguel Ángel Bustos confessed:

"I draw because I want to reach a freedom that cannot be reached with words."

The Swedish critic concluded:

"Miguel Angel Bustos is a visionary, a mystic, his vision passes through appearances to capture the essential signs that we reject as dreams or delusions."

In the late 1960s Miguel Ángel Bustos met Iris Alba, a designer, sculptor and ceramist, who became his wife and mother of his son Emiliano. During the 1970s, Bustos worked as a cultural journalist in various publications, including magazines such as Panorama and Siete Días, as well as in the newspapers La Opinión and El Cronista Comercial. He also taught at the Faculty of Philosophy and Letters of the University of Buenos Aires and continued studying Romanian.

== Political commitment, kidnapping and death ==
Initially linked to the UCRI in the 1950s, Bustos expressed sympathy for the Cuban Revolution and China, participating briefly in the Communist Youth Federation and collaborating with the monthly "Nuevo Hombre" (Buenos Aires, 1971–1974). According to testimonies, he also collaborated with the PRT's cultural front and distributed publications such as "El Combatiente" and "Estrella Roja".

On May 31, 1976 Bustos was kidnapped at his home in Buenos Aires. His friend and also a poet, Alberto Szpunberg, says that

"On Sunday, May 31, 1976, Miguel Ángel returned to his house on Hortiguera Street, two blocks from Parque Chacabuco, after taking a walk with Emiliano, who had just turned four years old. That night, at half past ten, more or less, they rang the doorbell, perhaps he could have fled, but he refused... The yellow cards shown by the murderers tried to give the raid some semblance of legality".

The day they took him away, Iris Alba says, five policemen entered her house. They ordered her to lock herself in the kitchen with the child. They break everything, smash her books. "We're taking him for a background check," they tell her. "Take a blanket, it's cold," they tell him. Then Bustos goes to her son's room and takes a blanket. "Miguel took a blanket from that room, and I watched from his little window, even though it was so small that I couldn't see anything," she said.

On June 20 of the same year he was killed along with ten other people in an open field in Avellaneda, in an episode known as the Sarandí Massacre. This fact, presented in the media as a confrontation, now we know that it was forged, gave rise to a file of the Military War Council. The subsequent investigation of related facts indicates that Bustos may have been kidnapped in the clandestine detention center "El Vesubio". His remains were thrown by the repressors in a grave in Sector 134 of the Avellaneda Cemetery and exhumed in 1991 by the Argentine Forensic Anthropology Team. Their identification was completed in 2014 and was carried out by founding members of that organization. On August 31 of that year, the day Bustos would have turned eighty-two, Emiliano and family gathered with poet friends and artists at the Parque de la Memoria to, in a sober ceremony, finally say goodbye to the poet, throwing the ashes into the Río de la Plata. The Bustos case was included in a court case in which crimes against humanity were investigated, proven and sentenced. The sentence was issued by the Oral Federal Criminal Court No. 5 of the Federal Capital.

== Legacy ==
Over the years Bustos' work has been recognized as fundamental to Argentine poetry by prominent poets and writers such as Manuel Mujica Laínez, Olga Orozco, Rodolfo Rabanal and Reynaldo Giménez. Diana Bellesi stresses that Bustos' work is essential in the life of any poet who appreciates reading other poets.

In 1998 Alberto Szpunberg published the posthumous book Despedida de los ángeles, which gathers unpublished poems by Bustos. In 2007, Emiliano Bustos compiled journalistic works, correspondence and essays by his father in the book Miguel Ángel Bustos, Prosa. 1960–1976, followed by the compilation of his father's complete poetry in Visión de los hijos del mal in 2008.

Bustos's work has transcended linguistic borders, being translated into English as Vision of the Children of Evil in 2018 and into French as Archipel du tremblement in 2015. In Italian it was published Frammenti fantastici, a work also comprising Quattro murales e Cuore con la pelle esposta in 2023. In 2022, the I International Poetry Prize Miguel Angel Bustos was awarded in Colombia.

In 2013 the exhibition "Everything is always now" was held at the Centro Cultural Borges, organized by Luis Felipe Noé and Eduardo Stupía, which exhibited the plastic work of Miguel Ángel Bustos in dialogue with the work of his son Emiliano. The exhibition was prematurely cancelled due to the theft of a painting by Miguel Ángel Bustos, an act attributed to political motivations.

Composers from different countries and musical genres have honored Bustos' work. Among them, the German composers Manfred Trojahn and Hans Jürgen von Bose. The latter produced Seven Texts based on the work of the Argentine poet, premiered in 1992 at the Teatro San Martín.

In 2022, in commemoration of the 90th anniversary of Bustos' birth, tributes were held at the National Library of Argentina and the Conti Cultural Center, highlighting the validity and transcendence of his artistic and poetic legacy.

== Publications ==
- Cuatro murales (With drawings, Author's edition, Buenos Aires, 1957)
- Corazón de piel afuera (Presentation by Juan Gelman, Nueva Expresión, Buenos Aires, 1959)
- Fragmentos fantásticos (With drawings by the author, Casa Editora Francisco Colombo, Buenos Aires, 1965)
- Visión de los hijos del mal (Prologue by Leopoldo Marechal, Sudamericana Publishing House, Buenos Aires, 1967).
- El Himalaya o la moral de los pájaros (With illustrations by the author, Sudamericana Publishing House, Buenos Aires, 1970).
- Visión de los hijos del mal - Poesía completa (Prologue and notes by Emiliano Bustos, Editorial Argonauta, Buenos Aires, 2008).
- Vision of the Children of Evil - Bilingual Edition (Translated by Lucina Schell, co•im•press, Chicago, 2018).

== General references ==
- "Miguel Angel Bustos – Escribirte.com.ar". 2008-04-28. Archived from the original on 2008-04-28.
