= Jornal da Tarde =

Brazilian newspaper

- Format: Daily
- Owner: Grupo SMEdit
- Founder: Mino Carta
- Editor: Alex Maciel
- Founded: 1966
- Language: Portuguese
- City: São Paulo
- Country: Brazil
- Website: https://jornaldatarde.com

Jornal da Tarde, often abbreviated JT, is a Brazilian daily newspaper based in São Paulo. Currently belongs to the SMEdit Group. The publication of the Jornal da Tarde takes place online. It was published by Grupo Estado, the owner of other prominent Brazilian news media such as O Estado de S. Paulo and Rádio Eldorado. It was founded in 1966 by the journalist Mino Carta in an attempt to introduce new journalism to Brazil.

== Editors ==
- Ivan Ângelo, 1966–1968
- Murilo Felisberto, 1968–1978
