= Claudia (magazine) =

Polish monthly women's magazine

- Categories: Women's magazine
- Frequency: Monthly
- Publisher: Grupa Kobieta
- Founded: 1993; 32 years ago
- Country: Poland
- Based in: Warsaw
- Language: Polish
- Website: Claudia
- ISSN: 1230-8609
- OCLC: 839214490

Claudia is a monthly women's magazine published in Warsaw, Poland. The magazine has been in circulation since 1993.

== History and profile ==
Claudia was established in 1993. Gruner + Jahr was the founding company. The magazine was published by Burda Publishing Polska SP. Z O.O. on a monthly basis. It is published by Grupa Kobieta. The headquarters of the monthly is in Warsaw. It targets Polish women around 20-45 years old who live in small cities.

Claudia achieved record circulation numbers in Poland at the beginning of the 2000s. In 2001 it was the twenty-third best-selling women's magazine worldwide with a circulation of 799,000 copies. In 2002 it was the most popular magazine in Poland.

The magazine sold 307,729 copies in 2010 and 261,716 copies in 2011. Its circulation rose to 276,752 copies in 2012.

== See also ==
- List of magazines in Poland
