= Exame =

- Managing Editor: André Lahóz
- Categories: Economy • Politics • Technology
- Frequency: Biweekly
- Circulation: 43 822
- Founded: 1967
- Company: Editora Abril
- Country: Brazil
- Based in: São Paulo
- Language: Portuguese
- Website: exame.com
- ISSN: 0102-2881
- OCLC: 10049319

Exame is a fortnightly magazine specializing in economics, business, politics and technology published by Editora Abril, in São Paulo, Brazil. It reports news, reviews and tips about business, sales, investments, economics, environment, technology and marketing.

Recent circulation history
Year	Total circulation
2014	162,500
2015	173,800
2016	149,600
2017	152,600
2018	117,700
2019	81,500
2020	55,466
2021	43,822

Launched in 1967, it is the leading business magazine in Brazil. Exame has a circulation of about 200.000 copies with 160,000 subscribers. 70 journalists, designers, revisers and photographers work for the paper. Its headquarters is located in São Paulo with offices in Rio de Janeiro, Brasília and New York City.

A publication with same title and masthead is published under licence of Editora Abril in Angola.
