= Victor Civita =

Brazilian businessman, journalist

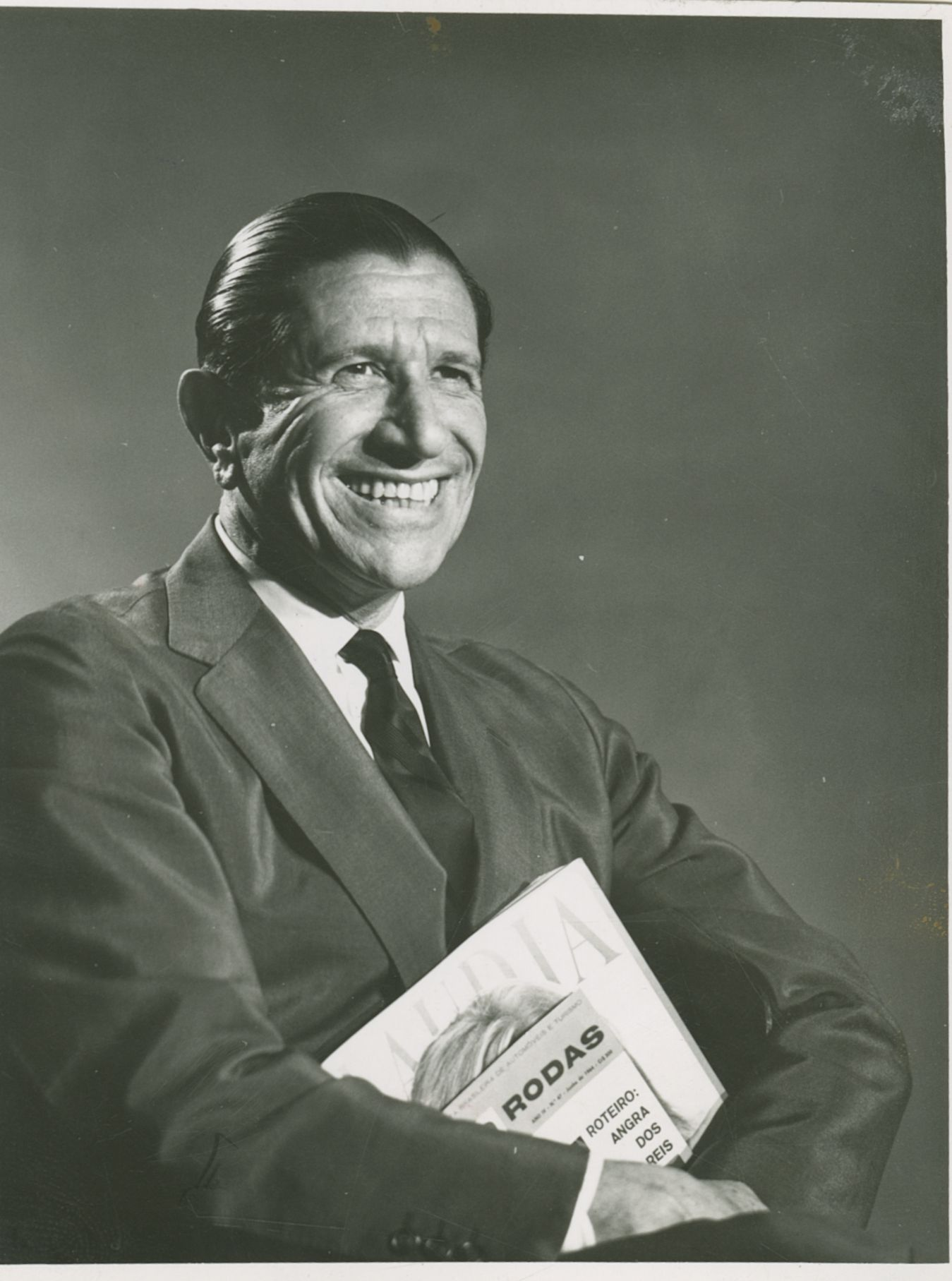

Signature
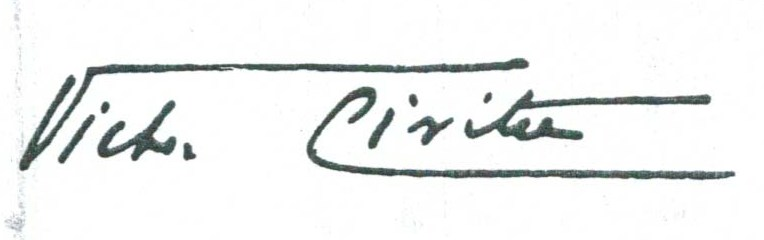

Victor Civita (Italian: [ˈt͡ʃi.vi.ta]; Portuguese pronunciation: [vikˈtoʁ siˈvi.tɐ]; February 9, 1907 – August 24, 1990) was an Italian-born Brazilian journalist and publisher. His family emigrated from Italy to New York in 1938 following passage of the Race Law.

In 1949 Civita relocated his family to Brazil, where he established the publishing house Editora Abril in São Paulo, which developed into Grupo Abril, one of the largest publishing houses in the country.

== Early life and education ==
Civita was born in New York City, to Italian parents Vittoria Carpi and Carlo Civita (his mother was an opera singer and his father a businessman). The family returned to Italy, settling in Milan, where Victor grew up with his older brother César and younger brother Daniel. Their father was Jewish.

After school and college, Victor followed his older brother into the publishing business. In 1938 the extended family of parents, grown sons and their families, all left Italy because of enactment of the Race Laws against Jews under the Fascist government of Benito Mussolini. They were considered Jewish because of their father. Victor had married Sylvana, a native of Rome. They had two boys, Roberto and Richard.

== Career ==
The extended family lived in New York for a couple of years. His parents and César and his family moved to Argentina. In 1941 his older brother César established the publishing house of Editorial Abril in Buenos Aires. By the 1960s it published nine magazines.

== Brazil ==
In 1949 Civita took his family from New York to São Paulo, where he founded Editora Abril the following year. Civita developed this into Grupo Abril, one of the largest publishing houses in Brazil.

When launching his first magazine published in Brazil, Civita reportedly personally attached placards to city streetcars, which read: "Donald Duck has arrived", showing his intention to connect to United States culture.

Civita was noted for promoting collaboration with the company's employees on goals and work processes. He died in São Paulo, aged 83.

His son, Roberto Civita (9 August 1936 – 26 May 2013), worked in the company and later became the Chairman of the Board and Editorial Director of the Abril Group.
