= Veja (magazine) =

Brazilian weekly magazine

- Veja logo as of 2011
- Editorial director: Mauricio Lima
- Categories: News, politics, economy, entertainment, sports and culture
- Publisher: Editora Abril
- Paid circulation: 184,391 (2021)
- First issue: 11 September 1968; 57 years ago
- Country: Brazil
- Based in: São Paulo
- Language: Portuguese
- Website: veja.abril.com.br
- ISSN: 0100-7122
- OCLC: 2464740

Veja (Portuguese pronunciation: [ˈveʒɐ], English: see, look [at it]) is a Brazilian weekly news magazine published in São Paulo and distributed throughout the country by media conglomerate Grupo Abril. It is the leading weekly publication in the country and one of the most influential Brazilian publishing outlets. Veja publishes articles on politics, economics, culture, world events, entertainment, and war. It also regularly includes editorial pieces related to themes like technology, ecology, and religious debate. It has recurring sections on cinema, television, practical literature, music, and guides on diverse subjects. It has been described as politically aligned with right-wing movements, though it does not describe itself as such.

== History and profile ==
Veja was first published on 11 September 1968, and was subject to censorship by the Brazilian military dictatorship from 1969 to 1976. In 1974 the magazine boosted the sales and the number of subscribers began to increase. Veja is known for its attacks on the worldwide left-wing; for instance, when Cuban ruler Fidel Castro left power, the magazine's front cover read "It was about time!" The magazine supports free market economy, more toughness on crime and the promotion of individual liberty. Well-known contributors to the magazine include Reinaldo Azevedo, Stephen Kanitz and Lya Luft.

During its early days, Veja was known for publishing hoaxes as facts. In 1975 it declared that the Loch Ness Monster was real before ultimately recognizing the news were fake. In 1983, it re-published an April Fools' Day prank from the British magazine New Science as real. According to Veja, scientists were able to fuse the molecules of a cow and a tomato in order to produce tomato-flavored meat. In 1989, it published a controversial piece about singer Cazuza, who was terminally ill from AIDS. It was considered of bad taste and proclaimed that the singer's legacy would not last. The same year, the magazine published a cover praising then presidential hopeful Fernando Collor de Mello later impeached for corruption.

On 2005, as part of its growing right-wing agenda, Veja defended the rejection of the prohibition of firearms in that year's referendum. According to Folha de S. Paulo columnist Barbara Gancia, Veja tried to mislead its readers presenting the referendum as a proposition of the ruling Workers' Party (PT) and its owners had a conflict of interest in campaigning against banning firearms; Veja's publishing company Editora Abril was a business partner of the Birmann family, owner of the Brazilian Cartridge Company. During the same year it was responsible for several news stories about the Mensalão scandal.

Veja had a circulation of 1,086,200 copies in 2010. In April 2012, the editor of the magazine Policarpo Júnior was accused by its rival CartaCapital, based on information revealed by the Federal Police, of being a close acquaintance of casino owner Carlinhos Cachoeira (gambling is illegal in Brazil). Cachoeira was then arrested for money laundering. According to CartaCapital, Cachoeira was responsible for arranging and filming the bribery meeting in the Correios which resulted in the Mensalão scandal. Júnior and Cachoeira had exchanged over 200 phone calls during the period investigated. The circulation of the magazine was 1,071,500 copies in 2012.

== Controversies ==
The magazine is often criticised for its bias. Journalists Luís Nassif and Mino Carta have both filed lawsuits against the magazine and its columnists (in particular Diogo Mainardi).

In its 25 May 2007 issue, Veja ran a story on then-Senate president, Renan Calheiros, accusing him of accepting funds from a lobbyist to pay for the child support of a daughter from an extramarital affair with journalist Monica Veloso. During a speech in his defense given in the Senate floor, Calheiros accused Grupo Abril, Veja's parent company, of having violated Brazilian corporate law in relation to its sale of 30% of the capital from its publishing arm to South African media group Naspers. Abril responded to Calheiros in a press release in which they denied all charges.

In August 2010, the Superior Electoral Court punished Veja for pro-José Serra bias during its coverage of the 2010 presidential election. The magazine published a claim made by Serra's vice-presidential candidate Índio da Costa that the Workers' Party (PT) had ties with the Fuerzas Armadas Revolucionarias de Colombia. Veja was forced to publish a rebuttal note from PT. Prior to the second round of the 2014 presidential election, Veja anticipated its weekly edition to publish a story claiming that both President Dilma Rousseff and her predecessor Luiz Inácio Lula da Silva were aware of a misappropriation scheme inside the state oil company Petrobras. The magazine headquarters was attacked by pro-PT protestors. Once again Veja was forced by the Supreme Electoral Court to publish a rebuttal from PT.

In July 2015 the magazine published a story claiming that federal contractor Léo Pinheiro would offer a plea bargaining alleging that Lula was aware and benefited from the aforementioned corruption case. However, Pinheiro claimed that the statements attributed to him were fake. As such, Lula decided to sue Veja for moral damages. On the same issue, the magazine accused former soccer player and Senator Romário of having a bank account in the tax haven country of Switzerland. After being sought by the Senator, Banca della Svizzera Italiana confirmed that the documents published by Veja were fake. BSI announced that it requested that the case be an investigated by the Office of the Attorney General of Switzerland. According to columnist Ricardo Noblat, Veja's actions may have been guided by Mayor of Rio de Janeiro Eduardo Paes, since Romário was a strong contester in the upcoming city election.

== Recent circulation history ==
Year	2015	2016	2017	2018	2019	2020	2021
Total circulation	1,178,100	1,121,600	1,232,700	802,100	546,300	261,300	184,391
