= Editora Abril =

Brazilian publisher and printing company

Editora Abril S.A.
- Type: Private company
- Industry: Media; Publishing; Broadcasting; Online services Printing
- Founded: May 1950
- Founder: Familia Civita
- Headquarters: São Paulo, São Paulo, Brazil
- Number of locations: São Paulo; Rio de Janeiro; Brasília; Belo Horizonte; Curitiba; Porto Alegre
- Key people: Roberto Civita (President of the Management Board and Editorial Director), Giancarlo Civita (Executive President of Grupo Abril)
- Revenue: ▲US$ 1.8 billion (2010)
- Number of employees: 5,970
- Parent: Grupo Abril
- Subsidiaries: Abril Educação, Dinap S.A.
- Website: assine.abril.com.br

Editora Abril (Portuguese pronunciation: [e.d͡ʒiˈto.ɾɐ aˈbɾiw]; lit. 'April Publishing Company') is a major Brazilian publisher and printing company and one of the biggest media holdings in Latin America. The company was founded in 1950 by Victor Civita in São Paulo and is now part of Grupo Abril.

== Overview ==
Civita had initially founded his publisher as Editora Primavera, publishing an unsuccessful comic magazine named in Brazil Raio Vermelho. The following year, Civita changed its name to Abril - referencing the month in which spring begins in the northern hemisphere—and published its first title, Donald Duck, in Brazil called Pato Donald, which continues to run to this date. Abril's first magazine lead Civita to claim "It all started with a duck", parodying Walt Disney's declaration that "I only hope that we never lose sight of one thing – that it was all started by Mickey Mouse."

Under its name it publishes titles like AnaMaria, Tititi, Minha Novela, Sou+Eu!, Quatro Rodas, Veja, Veja Rio, Veja São Paulo, Nova, Placar, Claudia, Boa Forma, Manequim, and Exame, as well as the Brazilian editions of Cosmopolitan, Men's Health, Women's Health, Runner's World, and Playboy.

It also owns the Brazilian MTV and cable company Abril Grafica. In May 2006, Naspers acquired a 30% interest in Editora Abril.

== See also ==
- Análise Editorial
- Editora Globo
