= Dilma Rousseff 2010 presidential campaign =

2010 Brazilian elections presidential campaign

- Campaign: 2010 Brazilian general election
- Candidate: Dilma Rousseff; Chief of Staff of the Presidency; (2005–2010); Michel Temer; 50th President of the Chamber of Deputies; (2009–2010)
- Affiliation: Para o Brasil Seguir Mudando (For Brazil to Keep on Changing); Coalition partners: PT; MDB; PDT; Republicans; PL; PCB; PSB; Agir; PTN
- Status: Official launch: 13 June 2010; Won election: 31 October 2010

Dilma Rousseff 2010 presidential campaign was supported by the center-left electoral coalition Para o Brasil Seguir Mudando (English: For Brazil to Keep on Changing), created by the Workers' Party (PT) to run in Brazil's 2010 general election. It included ten parties: PT, PMDB, PCdoB, PDT, PRB, PR, PSB, PSC, PTC and PTN. On 14 October, the PP unofficially joined the coalition. Dilma Rousseff had Michel Temer, from the PMDB, as her vice-president. They were elected on 31 October, and took office on 1 January 2011.

== Background ==
Rousseff was mentioned as a possible presidential candidate in April 2007; the following month, she declared her sympathy for the idea. In October of the same year, foreign newspapers such as La Nación and El País reported that she was a strong candidate to succeed Luiz Inácio Lula da Silva. In April 2008, The Economist indicated that her candidacy did not yet seem viable, as she was little known, despite being Lula's most popular minister.

In December 2008, President Lula stated that he had never talked to Dilma about her possible candidacy for the 2010 presidential elections, only suggested it. In his opinion, she would be the "most qualified person" to succeed him. In October 2009, Rousseff and Lula were accused by the opposition of conducting election propaganda before the deadline during his visits to the São Francisco River transposition works. The episode became more publicized when the President of the Federal Supreme Court, Gilmar Mendes, commented on the case.

== Campaign ==
Rousseff's candidacy was formalized on 13 June 2010, at the Workers' Party national convention held in Brasilia. The name of the then President of the Chamber of Deputies, Michel Temer (PMDB), as his vice-president was also confirmed. Participants included former minister José Dirceu, PT's leader in the Chamber, Fernando Ferro, and the party's general secretary, José Eduardo Cardozo. Her application was supported by famous figures such as Chico Buarque, Beth Carvalho, Alceu Valença, Elba Ramalho, Emir Sader, Oscar Niemeyer, Leonardo Boff and Marilena Chauí.

=== Manifesto ===
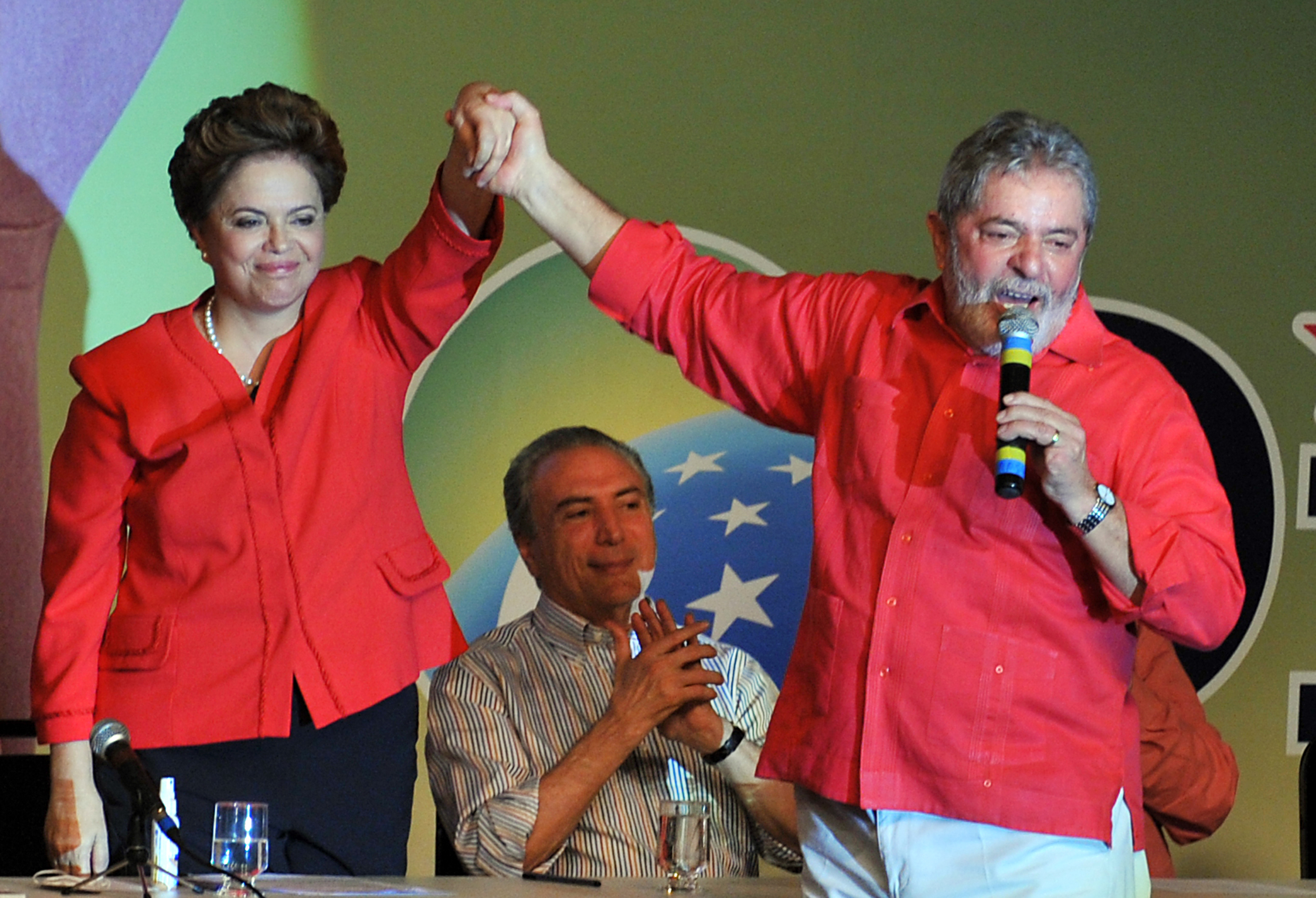
Dilma Rousseff and Lula at the Workers' Party National Convention in 2010

During the campaign, Rousseff made almost two hundred promises, including: universalizing the Unified Health System (Portuguese: Sistema Único de Saúde, SUS); eradicating poverty and illiteracy; expanding social programs such as Bolsa Família; expanding the Growth Acceleration Program (Programa de Aceleração do Crescimento, PAC); building six thousand nurseries and pre-schools; building more than two million Minha Casa, Minha Vida residences; reducing taxes; fighting corruption; controlling inflation; and reducing deforestation in the Amazon.

According to the newspaper O Estado de S. Paulo, Dilma's government program, registered with the Superior Electoral Court (TSE) on 6 July, a formality required by law, had two versions. Initially, the party registered a nineteen-page document, all signed by Rousseff, with supposedly controversial themes such as the regulation and democratization of the media, the legalization of abortion and land reform. Hours later, a second version signed by PT lawyers and without the most controversial themes, classified as radical by various media outlets such as Folha de S. Paulo, Exame and Veja magazine, was sent to replace the first one. Also according to the newspaper, Rousseff's advisors claim that both she and José Eduardo Dutra signed the version without reading the text. When asked, Dilma replied that "we don't agree with the position expressed [on media control, abortion and land invasion]" and that "there are things in the PT that we agree with, things that we don't agree with, as well as in the other parties".

=== Electoral fines ===
Rousseff was the first presidential candidate to receive an electoral fine for irregular advertising in the 2010 election. The first penalty, of R$5,000, was imposed on 13 May, after the TSE analysed the party program broadcast by the PT in December 2009 and considered that it involved early advertising in favor of Rousseff. The second infraction occurred on 10 April, at the headquarters of the Metalworkers' Union. The third fine, also in the amount of R$5,000, was applied on 8 July.

On 13 July, TSE Minister Nancy Andrighi issued another fine of R$6,000 to Rousseff. On 20 July, a representation filed by the Electoral Public Prosecutor's Office was accepted by Minister Henrique Neves and another fine of R$5,000 was imposed on her. On the same day, a penalty of the same value was charged. Overall, she received seven fines for early advertising, totaling R$33,000 in debt.

=== Alleged dossier ===
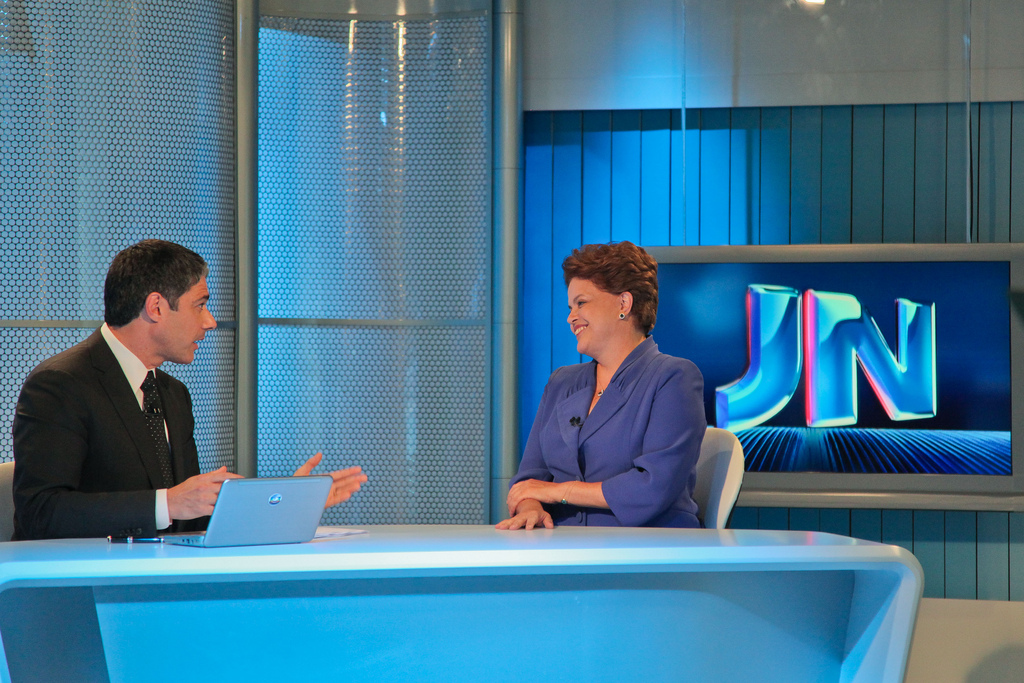
Dilma Rousseff in an interview for Jornal Nacional, alongside journalist William Bonner, in 2010

According to Folha de S. Paulo, Onésimo das Graças Sousa, a retired delegate from the Federal Police, claimed to have participated in a meeting with the coordinators of Rousseff's election campaign to create a dossier against fellow candidate José Serra. He stated that he refused and denounced the facts to the press. In testimony on 17 June to the Brazilian National Congress' Commission for the Control of Intelligence Activities, he said he had received death threats for disclosing the dossier plan.

In a second article published on 19 June, Folha de S. Paulo claimed that income tax returns of PSDB president Eduardo Jorge, obtained from the Internal Revenue Service system, were collected by an "intelligence group" from Rousseff's pre-campaign. The documents were also part of the alleged dossier which, according to Folha, was assembled with the approval of a section of the PT's presidential pre-campaign. Two days after the report was published, the PT's national leadership issued a statement denying any involvement by the party in the incident.

On 13 July, in testimony to the Senate Constitution and Justice Committee on the case, the secretary of the Federal Revenue Service, Otacílio Cartaxo, confirmed access to Eduardo Jorge's confidential tax data, but refused to name those responsible, even if the session was made secret. After Cartaxo's testimony, Federal Deputy Raul Jungmann (PPS-PE) said he would file a complaint with the Federal Public Prosecutor's Office (MPF) against him for malfeasance. Jungmann accused the PT of using the apparatus of the federal government to attack the opposition and declared: "First there was the case of the caretaker Francenildo Costa. Now the IRS is involved in another scandal. Transparency is fundamental in this investigation".

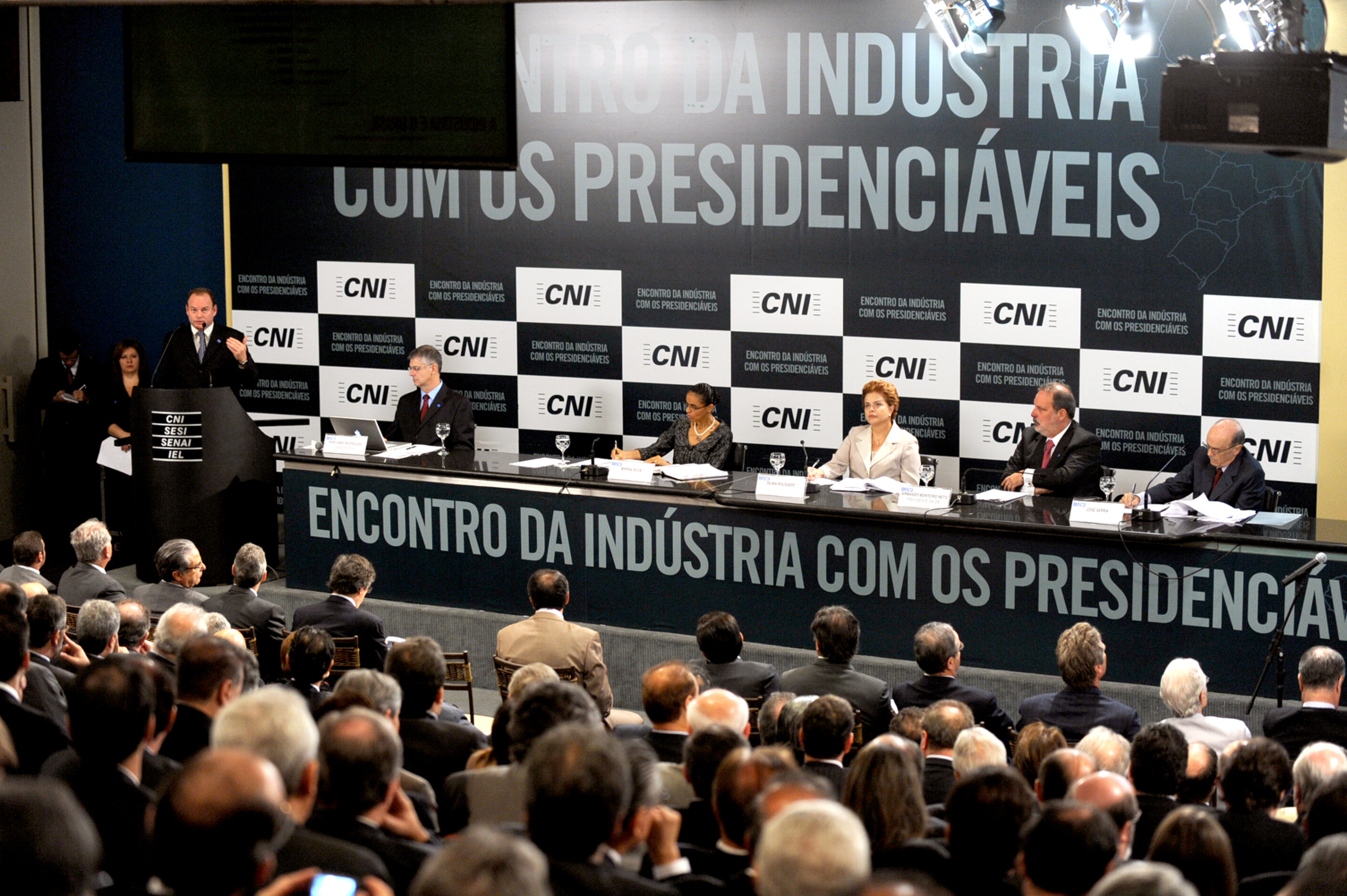
Debate between the presidential candidates organized by the National Confederation of Industry, May 2010

A report published by CartaCapital magazine in June claimed that the supposed dossier was actually a book entitled A Privataria Tucana, by journalist Amaury Ribeiro Júnior, about alleged scandals involving privatizations and embezzlement of public money in PSDB administrations. It was also mentioned that Onésimo, a specialist in counter-espionage, had offered the PT surveillance and wiretapping services, but this was dismissed. On 25 October, Amaury was indicted for four crimes by the Federal Police. In an interview with the Roda Viva program about Folha's allegations regarding the existence of the alleged dossier, Rousseff declared that the newspaper "has no credibility with the public" and that until it proves, it is "an unfounded accusation". She also affirmed that she only didn't sue the newspaper because she "respects freedom of the press". PT filed a lawsuit against José Serra for the accusations related to the alleged dossier.

On 21 July, Antonia Aparecida Silva was named as the possible responsible for the leak. She was a Federal Revenue (RFB) analyst and was dismissed from her commissioned position on 8 July, a week after the allegations appeared in the press and the RFB opened an investigation. According to the tax authorities, Antonia's password was used to consult and print the data without any legal justification. She has also been a member of the board of directors of the ABC region's revenue union. According to trade unionist Helio Bernardes, the current president of Sindireceita, she denies having accessed the data.

=== International repercussions ===
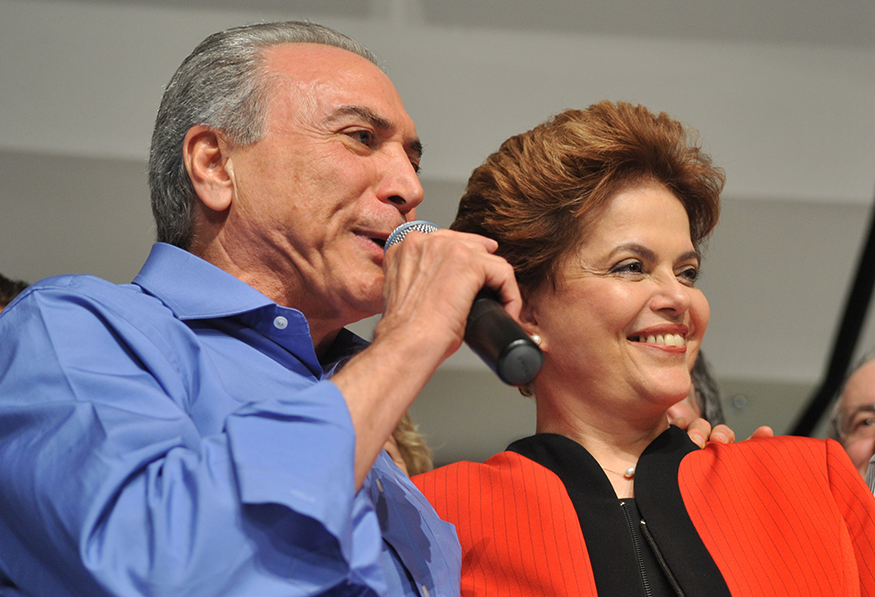
Rousseff with vice-presidential candidate Michel Temer

For the British newspaper The Independent, Rousseff's election "marks the final dissolution of the 'national security state', an arrangement that conservative governments in the United States and Europe have already seen as their best ploy to maintain a rotten status quo that has maintained a vast majority in Latin America in poverty, while favoring their rich friends". It also stated that she "is not embarrassed by her urban guerrilla past, which included fighting generals and spending time in prison as a political prisoner" and that, if elected, she will become "the most powerful woman in the world".

The Spanish newspaper El País characterized Rousseff as "a great manager, a woman more of action than of thought". Later, when estimating that José Serra could suffer a "humiliating defeat" at the polls, it criticized the appearance of scandals raised by other candidates on the eve of the elections, saying that "thousands of Brazilians dreamed of a smooth electoral campaign centered on the candidates' proposals, but once again foul play is eclipsing political debate".

Rousseff, who is of Bulgarian descent, received a two-page spread in Bulgaria's most important newspaper, Trud, and several journalists from the country's media outlets commented with excitement on the possibility of a daughter of Bulgarians being elected president of Brazil. During her campaign, Bulgaria experienced a kind of "fever" and interest in Rousseff.

=== Performance ===
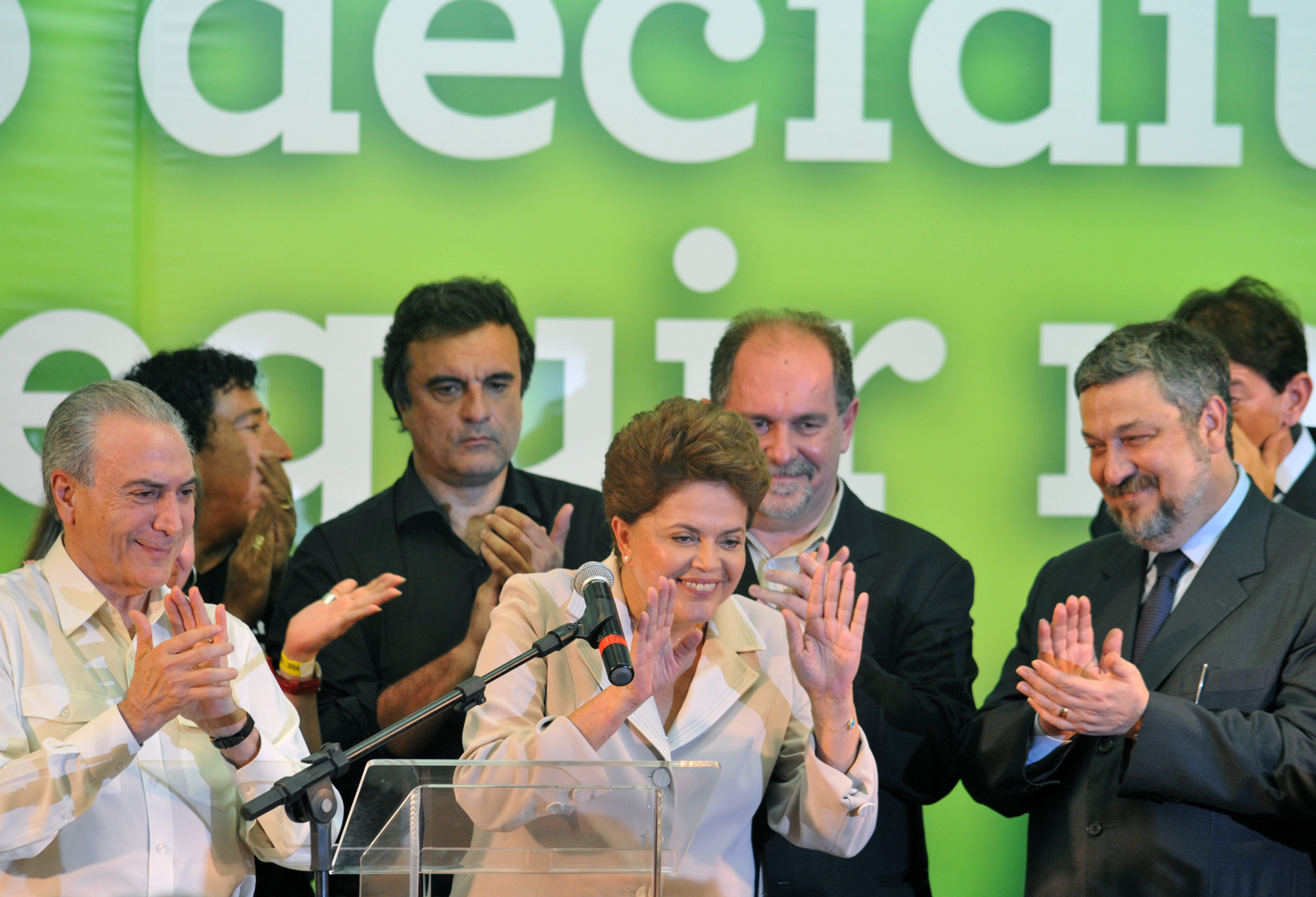
Rousseff after being elected Brazil's first female president on 31 October 2010

In the first round of elections on 3 October, Dilma received more than 47 million votes and became the most voted woman in the Americas. In the second round, the Para o Brasil Seguir Mudando coalition received the support of the PP, which had remained neutral in the first round, although the majority of its directors and candidates had already supported her. PSOL instructed its members not to give "any vote to Serra", but to vote for Rousseff. While the party's presidential candidate, Plínio de Arruda Sampaio, declared a null vote, the party's congressional group advocated a "critical vote" for Rousseff.

On 31 October, Rousseff was elected president of Brazil with 56.05% of the total valid votes, against 43.95% for José Serra. In her speech, she dealt with different themes, such as valuing democracy, freedom of the press, freedom of religion and women. She also stated that her government would keep inflation under control, improve public spending, simplify taxation and improve public services for the population.

In the parliamentary elections, the Para o Brasil Seguir Mudando coalition won 352 of the 513 seats in the Chamber of Deputies and 54 of the 81 seats in the Federal Senate, which guaranteed Rousseff a large majority in both houses of parliament. The coalition also elected 11 of the 18 governors in the first round and five more governors in the second round. The opposition, led by the O Brasil Pode Mais (Brazil Can Do More) coalition, decreased from 133 to 111 federal deputies and from 38 to 27 senators and elected 11 governors. The left-wing opposition to the federal government led by PSOL maintained three seats in the House and gained one more seat in the Senate.

== See also ==
- Impeachment of Dilma Rousseff
