= Brazilian Social Democracy Party =

Political party in Brazil

Brazilian Social Democracy Party Partido da Social Democracia Brasileira
- Abbreviation: PSDB
- President: Aécio Neves
- General Secretary: Adolfo Viana
- Vice President: Paulo Serra; Beto Richa; Maria Estela Kubitschek
- Treasurer: Paulo Abi-Ackel
- Honorary President: Fernando Henrique Cardoso
- Founded: 25 June 1988; 38 years ago
- Legalized: 24 August 1989; 37 years ago
- Split from: Brazilian Democratic Movement
- Headquarters: SGAS Q.607, Ed. Metrópolis, Mód. B Cobertura 2 - Asa Sul; Brasília, Brazil
- Think tank: Instituto Teotônio Vilela
- Youth wing: Juventude PSDB
- Women's wing: PSDB Mulher
- Black wing: TucanAFRO
- LGBT wing: Diversidade Tucana
- Membership: ▼1,305,253
- Ideology: Third Way; Social liberalism; Neoliberalism; Historical: Social democracy
- Political position: Centre to centre-right; Historical, now minority: Centre to centre-left
- National affiliation: PSDB Cidadania Federation
- International affiliation: Centrist Democrat International
- Regional affiliation: Christian Democrat Organization of America (observer)
- Colours: Blue; Yellow
- TSE Identification Number: 45
- Chamber of Deputies: 11 / 513
- Federal Senate: 2 / 81
- Governorships: 2 / 27
- State Assemblies: 27 / 1,024
- Mayors: 276 / 5,569

Website
- www.psdb.org.br
- Politics of Brazil; Political parties; Elections; A: It has also been described as center-left, and right-wing by some sources.

The Brazilian Social Democracy Party (Portuguese: Partido da Social Democracia Brasileira, PSDB), also known as the Brazilian Social Democratic Party or the Party of Brazilian Social Democracy, is a political party in Brazil.

Born as part of the social democratic opposition to the military dictatorship from the late 1970s through the 1980s, PSDB later shifted toward neoliberalism and liberal conservatism in the 1990s. PSDB governed Brazil from 1995 to 2003 with the Presidency of Fernando Henrique Cardoso, and was the runner-up for all presidential elections from 2003 to 2014. The PSDB and the Workers' Party (PT) have been the bitterest of rivals in Brazilian politics since the 1990s: both parties prohibit any kind of coalition or official cooperation with each other at any government levels. As the formerly third largest party in the National Congress, was the main opposition party against the PT administrations of Luiz Inácio Lula da Silva and Dilma Rousseff from 2003 to 2016. While still the fifth in number of members, with 1,291,811 registered, PSDB has lost a lot of space in the political scenario after several losses at the 2018 and 2022 elections, several internal splits, while at the same time the main opposition to PT became the Bolsonarist movement, resulting in the loss of several members and electorate.

Generally described as being on the centre to centre-right of the political spectrum, the PSDB's mascot is a blue and yellow colored toucan, with party members being called tucanos for this reason. Famous tucanos include Mário Covas, Geraldo Alckmin (now a member of the PSB), Tasso Jereissati, Aécio Neves, former President Fernando Henrique Cardoso, Franco Montoro, Aloysio Nunes, Yeda Crusius, João Doria, and José Serra.

== History ==
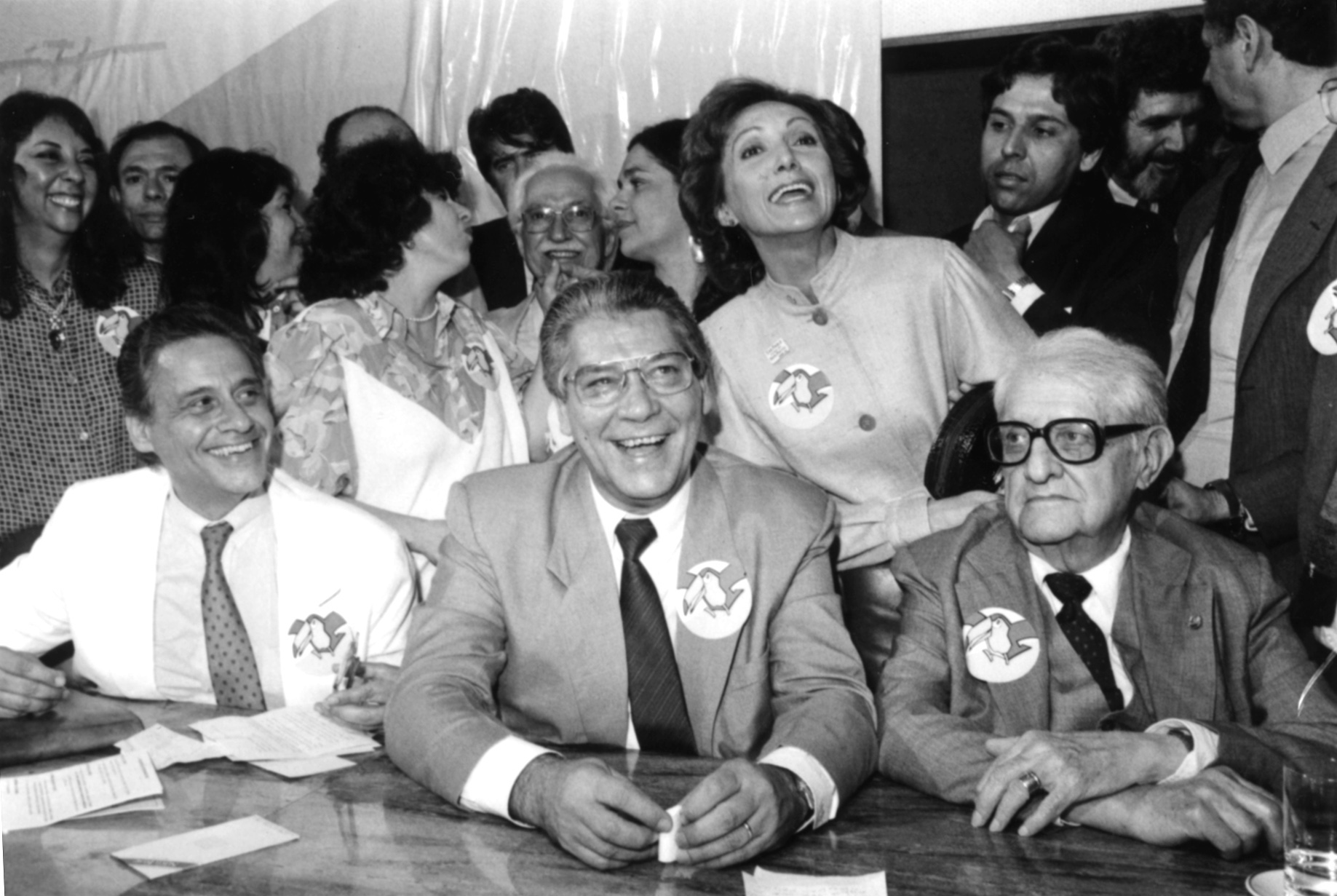
Ceremony for the foundation of the PSDB in 25th of June, 1988. From left to right the three founders of the party: Fernando Henrique Cardoso, Mário Covas and Afonso Arinos

With the imminent collapse of the military dictatorship in the early 1980s, a group of left-wing intellectuals were mobilized to create a leftist party. Some of them attempted to work with the labour movement led by Luiz Inácio Lula da Silva, but the group split over ideological grounds. A group of democratic socialists and Trotskyists joined the labour movement and founded the Workers' Party (PT) while the social democrats remained in the Brazilian Democratic Movement Party (PMDB) and would later create the Brazilian Social Democracy Party. Founded on 25 June 1988 by members of the Brazilian Democratic Movement Party (PMDB) linked to the European social democratic movement as an attempt to clarify their ideals, its manifesto preached "democracy as a fundamental value" and "social justice as an aim to be reached". In its foundation, the party attempted to unite political groups as diverse as social democrats, social liberals, Christian democrats and democratic socialists. The period when the PSDB was created was a very significant moment in the history of Brazilian politics.

On 21 April 1985, President-elect Tancredo Neves died, having been the last President not elected directly by the people since the beginning of the military dictatorship. With the formation of new parties, including the PSDB, a National Constitutional Assembly was created and drafted the current democratic constitution in 1988. A high proportion of the first members of the PSDB came from the so-called "historic PMDB", which was and still is a very large party with many internal conflicts. The founders of the PSDB were dissatisfied with the results of the National Constitutional Assembly and decided to create a party to reflect the need for a national political renewal. As their manifesto states, the new party was created "away from the official benefits, but close to the pulsing of the streets" (taken from a speech by party leader Franco Montoro). Some of the founding members were José Serra, Mário Covas, Ciro Gomes, André Franco Montoro, Fernando Henrique Cardoso, Aécio Neves and Geraldo Alckmin.

In a country where two constitutional referendums, held in 1963 and in 1993, have shown a very strong preference for a presidential system of government as in most countries of the Americas, the PSDB stands almost alone in the preference given in its manifesto to a parliamentarian system of government. However, after the electors rejected parliamentarism in 1993 and even though the PSDB leader Cardoso was elected president the next year, the party did nothing in subsequent years to further the cause of a parliamentarian system.

Presidential elections against Workers' Party between 1994 and 2014

The PSDB is one of the largest and most significant political parties in Brazil. Its official program says its policies are social democratic and often associated with the Third Way movement, although the party is also seen as influenced by neoliberalism. The party's program states that it "reject[s] populism and authoritarianism, as well as both fundamentalist neoliberalism and obsolete national-statism".

Despite its name, the PSDB is not a member of the Socialist International which draws together social democratic parties worldwide (the Brazilian member of the Socialist International is the Democratic Labour Party, PDT). The party has never had the links to trade union movements that usually characterize social democratic parties; it used to sponsor a central union, the Social-Democracia Sindical (SDS), which has now merged with the Central Autônoma dos Trabalhadores (CAT) and the much more important Central Geral dos Trabalhadores (CGT) into the União Geral dos Trabalhadores (UGT), but its impact among the unions has always been quite unimpressive compared to even much smaller parties as the PDT or the Communist Party of Brazil, or to the tucanos's own influence in society at large. After supporting the candidacy of Geraldo Alckmin in the 2018 presidential election (which was eliminated in the first round with 4.8 per cent of the vote), in the second round, some of the party's leaders supported the far-right candidate Jair Bolsonaro, to whom most of the party's traditional electorate had already turned, while former São Paulo Governor Alberto Goldman endorsed Workers’ Party candidate Fernando Haddad instead.

=== Recent times ===
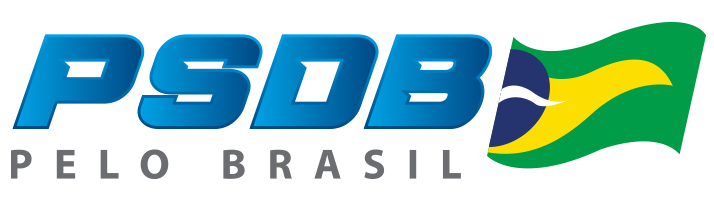
PSDB logo used between 2019 and 2023.

After suffering defeats in the 2016 and 2018 elections, PSDB went through a rebranding. The font of their logo was changed, the toucan was removed in favor of a flag of Brazil and the party received the new motto Pelo Brasil ("For Brazil"). However, after heavy losses in the 2022 Brazilian general election, especially with the loss of their longtime hegemony in São Paulo, the party's principles were revised and the toucan logo was reinstated under Eduardo Leite's leadership, alongside a new motto, Um só Brasil ("Only one Brazil").

== Controversies ==
=== Ranking of corruption ===
Based on data released by the Superior Electoral Court, the Movement to Combat Electoral Corruption released a ranking on 4 October 2007 regarding the parties that included the largest number of elected officials exposed for corruption since 2000. The PSDB appeared in third place on the list with 58 cases, behind only the Democrats and the PMDB.

The PSDB was considered Brazil's "dirtiest" party by the country's electoral authority. Yet, according to a 2016 academic study, the party has clearly benefited from the complacency of the Brazilian media, which has barely mentioned these cases.

According to an analysis released on 8 September 2012, of 317 Brazilian politicians who were barred from running in elections by the Clean Record Act, the PSDB is the party that has the largest number of barred candidates with 56 party members.

=== A Privataria Tucana ===
The 2011 book A Privataria Tucana, written by journalist Amaury Ribeiro Jr., a former special reporter of weekly magazine ISTO É and daily newspaper O Globo, highlighted documents that show alleged irregularities in privatizations that occurred during the administration of the former President Fernando Henrique Cardoso. It contains about 140 pages of photocopied documents in support of the claim that President Cardoso's Minister of Planning and later Minister of Health José Serra received kickbacks from businessmen who participated in the Brazilian privatization process, held companies in tax shelters, and moved millions of dollars between 1993 and 2003.

== Ideology ==
Although the PSDB declares itself as a centrist party, some people on the left reject this definition, especially after Fernando Henrique Cardoso embraced Third Way politics as president. The party has been seen as neoliberal by critics from its beginnings. Luiz Carlos Bresser-Pereira, one of the founders of the PSDB, left the party in 2011 for ideological reasons, claiming "that the party had taken a hard turn to the right".

Since abandoning its more leftist positions, the party has been described as centrist, centre-right, centre-left, and right-wing.

In an article titled "The left-right confusion in the post-Berlin Wall world", political analyst Angelo Segrillo says that "most analysts defined PSDB as center-left as of its foundation, after all, it was the Brazilian Social Democratic Party". As he notes, "this story changed after 1994, with the election of PSDB to the presidency. [...] A rhetoric of overcoming classical ideological division [...] was one of the justifications of the grand parliamentary alliance with center and right-wing parties. [...] As such, after the 1994 presidential election, most analysts started defining PSDB as a center party along with PMDB". In its 2009 report about Freedom in the World, Freedom House defined the opposition coalition (formed by PSDB, PPS and Democrats) as a "center-right coalition". However, in the 2010 report by the same organization, PSDB was defined as a "center-left" party.

Political scientist Glauco Peres notes that the party's move toward conservatism came "in stages," from "the liberal policies and major privatizations of the Cardoso era" to the gradual emergence of a "conservative and religious discourse" in the early 2010s to the failed campaign of the party's right-wing presidential candidate Aecio Neves in 2014.

Workers' Party campaign leader Marco Aurélio Garcia criticized declarations made by PSDB president Sérgio Guerra that PSDB is "the real left". He said that "PSDB is not a right wing party, it is the party of the right wing".

=== Ideological shift and consistency ===
Although some sources (including one by Matheus Leone, member of the Distrito Federal branch of the PSDB) have stated that the party still adhered to social democracy in the form of Third Way economic policies, other sources dispute it, evaluating that the party ideologically shifted towards liberalism, social liberalism, economic liberalism, or neoliberalism.

The PSDB has been described as being between progressive and conservative forces on social views. or moderately progressive,

It has also condemned the capturing of Nicolás Maduro as "violations of sovereignty" while also calling the regime authoritarian and "a dictatorship", favouring instead "Venezuelan democratic forces" that are "led by the Venezuelans themselves." .

=== Political alignment ===
The PSDB questions the use of what it considers "outdated political labels" such as "left" and "right". To quote a document drafted by Fernando Henrique Cardoso's office in 1990:

"If left means to be against the existing social order, and right in favor, then social-democracy is without doubt a left current. [...] A social democrat is before anything else someone who has critical sense — who realizes the injustices of society and has no fear to oppose them, even at the risk of being taken as a subversive or a dreamer".

The party did not preach nationalization or privatization in general ("the consensus is that the state must not be too big or too small, but 'have the size and functions corresponding to the needs of the whole of society'"), yet President Cardoso privatized many large public companies, such as Companhia Vale do Rio Doce and the national telecommunication system. Many political scientists in Brazil believed that the party in its antagonism with the PT made a move to the right in recent years to fill a void in the Brazilian political spectrum and to put a certain distance between itself and the PT's political views, which also moved more to the right (from the far-left or left to the centre-left) in the 1990s in order to be elected.

=== Voter base ===
The main electoral base of the party is the State of São Paulo, where the party triumphed in all but three major elections to executive office. The party also has a stronghold in other regions which reject the PT, like Espirito Santo, and in some southern and mid-western states. Unlike the PT, the party has more success in more local elections in the same areas that often vote for the PT in national elections, like the North and Northeastern regions and Minas Gerais. Many leaders of the party come from these regions, like Tasso Jereisatti, Aécio Neves, Teotonio Vilela Filho, Cassio Cunha Lima, Sergio Guerra and Simão Jatene. However, the party has not succeeded in transforming this into results in presidential elections, partly because of Luiz Inácio Lula da Silva's charisma and partly because of internal infighting.

Most rejection of the party comes from the State of Rio de Janeiro, where the positioning of the party in the Brazilian centre and centre-right often loses to PMDB and another parties with less national representation, like the Brazilian Republican Party, the Democrats, Progressistas and the Social Christian Party. The only victory of the party in Rio occurred in 1994, when the majority of voters in the state supported FHC in the presidential election and the toucans Artur da Tavola and Marcello Alencar were elected to the senate and state governorship, respectively. PT is also strongly rejected in Rio, however less than PSDB.

Despite being considered a centre-left party by their own members, media and by the Brazilian right, the PSDB has little or no appeal to the majority of Brazilian left. The majority of support and bases of tucanos comes from right-wing sectors like conservative Christians, professionals, the middle and upper middle class, farmers, landowners and business owners. Reasons for this support derive from the more moderate rhetoric and ideology of the party compared with the PT, the major economic reforms which the party led in the 1990s, and the major influence of the Democrats in the party.

This support is not viewed well inside the "old guard" of the party. Many tucanos often publicly express their discomfort with the party. Even Cardoso, the most successful figure in the party's history, constantly criticizes such PSDB politicians as Colonel Telhada, a former police officer who was elected a deputy in São Paulo with proposals such as reducing the age of defense of infancy, harsher penalties for criminals and appealing to the evangelical churches, of which Telhada is a member; and João Dória Junior, mayor of São Paulo between 2016 and 2018 and governor of the state of São Paulo since 2019. Dória is often accused of populism, demagoguery, opportunism, personalism, self-promotion, market fundamentalism and aggressive exploitation of anti-Workers' Party sentiment within the populace. These antagonisms persist between the voter base together with the new members who joined the party based on right-wing sentiment of opposition to the Workers' Party versus the party elite and older members with more left-liberal, progressive, social democratic and pragmatic views, thus an important factor in the often internal rifts between tucanos.

In 2017, a group of new, young federal representatives, nicknamed "blackheads", in reference to their youth (contrasting the gray or bald heads of older and progressive members), began to gain prominence in the party. This wing, made up of members in their 30s or younger, has shown strong opposition to support of the party for the government of President Michel Temer and far more support for economic liberalism than the old party members like José Serra and Aloysio Nunes. Blackheads now occupy important positions inside the party and with support of the base and social movements like the Free Brazil Movement have the capacity to push the party more to the right wing of the Brazilian political spectrum.

In the 2018 general election, the party suffered the greatest defeat in its history as Geraldo Alckmin came in fourth in the presidential election with less than 5% of votes and the party fell to 10th position in number of representatives in the Chamber of Deputies, with fewer representatives than the Democrats. The key reasons for this failure were the corruption scandals of Aécio Neves, the party's support for the government of Michel Temer, the lack of charisma and wrong strategies of Alckmin in the presidential campaign, which chose to attack the right-wing populist candidate Jair Bolsonaro from a progressive viewpoint instead of attacking the traditional rival PT, and a continuing domination of old leftist leaders instead of new and more liberal members with stronger connection with the voter base over the party. They support Bolsonaro and his Social Liberal Party smashed the voter base of the party. The PSDB faced a runoff in three of the four biggest states, namely São Paulo, Minas Gerais and Rio Grande do Sul, all of them with more pro-free market and centre-right views than Alckmin. PSDB triumphed in São Paulo with João Doria Junior, Rio Grande do Sul with Eduardo Leite and in the agrarian state of Mato Grosso do Sul with Reinaldo Azambuja, also a centre-right candidate.

According to researcher Christophe Ventura, the party's candidates are often evangelicals, multimillionaires and entrepreneurs. They present themselves as "managers" rather than "politicians".

== Party leadership ==
=== List of party presidents ===
Picture	Name	Term	
Picture	Name	Begin	End
	Provisory Committee (Note: Alternation between Franco Montoro, Fernando Henrique Cardoso, Mário Covas, José Richa and Pimenta da Veiga.)	1988	1989
	Franco Montoro	1989	1991
	Tasso Jereissati	1991	1994
	Pimenta da Veiga	1994	1995
	Artur da Távola	1995	1996
	Teotônio Vilela Filho	1996	2001
	José Aníbal	2001	2003
	José Serra	2003	2005
	Eduardo Azeredo	January 2005	October 2005
	José Serra	October 2005	November 2005
	Tasso Jereissati	November 2005	23 November 2007
	Sérgio Guerra	23 November 2007	18 May 2013
	Aécio Neves	18 May 2013	17 December 2017
	Geraldo Alckmin	17 December 2017	31 May 2019
	Bruno Araújo	31 May 2019	31 January 2023
	Eduardo Leite	31 January 2023	30 November 2023
	Marconi Perillo	30 November 2023	27 November 2025
	Aécio Neves	27 November 2025	Incumbent

==== Honor Presidents ====
Picture	Name	Term		Convention	Notes
Picture	Name	Begin	End	Convention	Notes
	Franco Montoro	1994	1995		Died in 1999
	Franco Montoro	1996	1998		Died in 1999
	Franco Montoro	1999	2001		Died in 1999
	Fernando Henrique Cardoso	2001	2003		
	Fernando Henrique Cardoso	2003	2005		
	Fernando Henrique Cardoso	2005	2007		
	Fernando Henrique Cardoso	2007	2009		
	Fernando Henrique Cardoso	2009	2011		
	Fernando Henrique Cardoso	2011	2013		
	Fernando Henrique Cardoso	2013	2015		
	Fernando Henrique Cardoso	2015	2017		
	Fernando Henrique Cardoso	2017	Incumbent		

== Prominent members and former members ==
=== President and candidates ===
- Fernando Henrique Cardoso, former President of Brazil
- José Serra, former senator for São Paulo, former Minister of Health, Minister of Foreign Affairs and presidential candidate for 2002 and 2010
- Aécio Neves, former party president, current federal deputy for Minas Gerais, former senator for Minas Gerais and presidential candidate for 2014
- João Doria, former governor of São Paulo and former presidential candidate for 2022, former member
- Geraldo Alckmin, former governor of São Paulo and presidential candidate for 2006 and 2018, former member

=== Governors and Senators ===
- Eduardo Leite, current governor of Rio Grande do Sul, former member
- Raquel Lyra, current governor of Pernambuco, former member
- Eduardo Riedel, current governor of Mato Grosso do Sul
- Tasso Jereissati, former party president and former senator for Ceará
- Plínio Valério, current senator for Amazonas
- Izalci Lucas, current senator for the Federal District, former member
- Mara Gabrilli, current senator for São Paulo and candidate for vice president in 2022, former member
- Alessandro Vieira, current senator for Sergipe, former member
- José Serra, former Senator for São Paulo
- Reinaldo Azambuja, former governor of Mato Grosso do Sul
- Ranolfo Vieira Júnior, former governor of Rio Grande do Sul
- Rodrigo Garcia, former governor of São Paulo, former member
- Carlos Almeida, former vice governor of Amazonas
- Paulo Brant, former vice governor of Minas Gerais, former member

=== Mayors and Deputies ===
- Adolfo Viana, current federal deputy for Bahia and party floor leader at the Chamber of Deputies
- Geovania de Sá, current federal deputy for Santa Catarina and third secretary of the Chamber of Deputies
- Aécio Neves, current federal deputy for Minas Gerais and chairman of the Committee for External Relations and National Defence
- Álvaro Costa Dias, current mayor of Natal
- Cinthia Ribeiro, current mayor of Palmas
- Hildon Chaves, current mayor of Porto Velho
- Maurício Carvalho, current vice mayor of Porto Velho

== Electoral history ==
=== Presidential elections ===
Election	Candidate	First round		Second round		Role
Election	Candidate	Votes	Vote %	Votes	Vote %	Role
1989	Mário Covas	7,786,939	11.5% (4th)			In opposition
1994	Fernando Henrique Cardoso	34,362,726	54.3 (1st)			In government coalition
1998	Fernando Henrique Cardoso	35,922,692	53.1 (1st)			In government coalition
2002	José Serra	19,694,843	23.2 (2nd)	33,356,860	38.7 (2nd)	In opposition
2006	Geraldo Alckmin	39,968,369	41.6 (2nd)	37,543,178	39.2 (2nd)	In opposition
2010	José Serra	33,132,283	32.6 (2nd)	43,711,388	44.0 (2nd)	In opposition
2014	Aécio Neves	34,897,211	33.6 (2nd)	51,041,155	48.4 (2nd)	In opposition
2018	Geraldo Alckmin	5,096,277	4.8 (4th)			In government coalition
2022	Mara Gabrilli (Note: as Vice President. Simone Tebet of the MDB was presidential candidate.)	4,915,423	4.16 (3rd)			In opposition

=== Legislative elections ===
Election	Chamber of Deputies				Federal Senate				Role in government
Election	Votes	%	Seats	+/–	Votes	%	Seats	+/–	Role in government
1990	3,515,809	8.68%	38 / 513	New	N/A	N/A	1 / 32	New	Independent
1994	6,350,941	13.90%	62 / 513	▲24	15,652,182	16.34%	9 / 54	▲8	Coalition
1998	11,684,900	17.54%	99 / 513	▲37	6,366,681	10.30%	16 / 81	▲5	Coalition
2002	12,473,743	14.26%	70 / 513	▼29	21,360,291	13.90%	11 / 81	▼5	Opposition
2006	12,691,043	13.62%	65 / 513	▼6	10,547,778	12.50%	14 / 81	▲3	Opposition
2010	11,477,380	11.88%	53 / 513	▼12	30,903,736	18.13%	11 / 81	▼3	Opposition
2014	11,073,631	11.39%	54 / 513	▲1	23,880,078	26.73%	10 / 81	▼1	Opposition (2014-2016)
2014	11,073,631	11.39%	54 / 513	▲1	23,880,078	26.73%	10 / 81	▼1	Coalition (2016-2018)
2018	5,905,541	6.01%	29 / 513	▼25	20,310,558	11.85%	8 / 81	▼2	Support
2022	3,309,061	3.02%	13 / 513	▼16	1,394,547	1.37%	4 / 81	▼4	Opposition
2026	2,742,544	2.41%	11 / 513	▼2	2,789,626	1.34%	2 / 81	▼2	TBA

=== Municipal elections ===
Mayors
Election	Votes	% votes	+/–	No. of Mayors won	+/–
2008	14,537,570	N/A	New	791 / 5,568	New
2012	13,950,000	13.57 (2nd)	N/A	693 / 5,568	▼94
2016	17,633,653	N/A	N/A	803 / 5,568	▲110
2020	10,332,139	N/A	N/A	520 / 5,568	▼283
2024	4,607,809	4.12%	N/A	276 / 5,568	▼244

== Notes ==
Preceded by 44 – UNION (UNIÃO)	Numbers of Brazilian Official Political Parties; 45 – BSDP (PSDB)	Succeeded by 50 – SOLP (PSOL)
