= Privatizations under the Fernando Henrique Cardoso presidency =

The presidency of Fernando Henrique Cardoso (1995–2003) oversaw the largest privatizations in Brazil's history. During this period, approximately R$ 78.6 billion were added to public coffers through privatizations. The sale of state-owned companies was a measure adopted by the government to address concerns about the worsening public debt. Despite these efforts, privatizations did not halt the increase in public debt, which rose from 78 billion dollars in 1996 to 245 billion in 2002.

== Privatized sectors ==
During Fernando Henrique's first mandate, which began on January 1, 1995, and ended on December 31, 1998, eighty companies were privatized.

=== Vale do Rio Doce Company ===
In May 1997, the federal government under President Fernando Henrique Cardoso privatized Companhia Vale do Rio Doce. The government argued that state management of Vale made the company less competitive, limiting its flexibility due to compliance with bidding legislation and the Federal Government's inability to provide capital contributions for investments.

Founded by the Federal Government in 1942, a portion of the shareholding from the controlling block was offered for sale at 3.3 billion reais. This amount would correspond to nearly 22 billion reais today, or precisely 21,920,374,410.00, adjusted for inflation using the IPCA for the period between 1997 and 2020.

The sale of 41.73% of Vale's ordinary shares took place on May 6, 1997, through an auction held at the Rio de Janeiro Stock Exchange. The company's new controlling shareholder became Consórcio Brasil, which included Companhia Siderúrgica Nacional, led by Benjamin Steinbruch, with 16.30% (R$ 1.3 billion); Litel Participações (representing the pension funds Previ, Petros, Funcef, and Fundação Cesp) with 10.43% (R$ 834.5 million); Eletron S/A (led by Opportunity Bank) with 10% (R$ 800 million); and Sweet River (Nations Bank) with 5% (R$ 400 million).

Vale's controlling stake was acquired for US$3,338,178,240, or approximately 3.3 billion dollars at the time, with a premium of 19.99%. This amount represented less than a quarter of the company's total capital. Previously owned by the Federal Government, this stake corresponded to 41.73% of the company's ordinary shares (with voting rights). The Federal Government retained 35.19% of the ordinary shares, while the preferred shares (without voting rights) remained in the hands of private shareholders. On the day of the privatization, a protest took place in front of the Rio de Janeiro Stock Exchange, attended by approximately 300 people, according to a book documenting the company's history.

The Consórcio Brasil established Valepar on April 9, 1997, with the sole purpose of acting as a shareholder in Vale, where it held the controlling stake. In 2001, CSN exited Vale following a share-swapping operation between the two companies. As part of the arrangement, Previ and Bradespar sold their stakes in CSN to Grupo Vicunha, while CSN sold its stake in Vale to Previ and Bradespar.

Today, Vale do Rio Doce is one of the largest private companies in Brazil, with an estimated market value of R$ 244 billion. Proponents of its privatization argue that the process was "beneficial," as the company now generates more jobs for the country and pays more taxes to the federal government compared to when it was state-owned. Currently, the company employs approximately sixty thousand people and contributes three billion dollars annually in taxes. In 2008, it reported revenues of 38.5 billion dollars and accounted for half of Brazil's primary surplus.

The privatization of Vale do Rio Doce has been the subject of significant criticism and controversy, including allegations of bribery during the auction, flaws in the sale notice, and undervaluation of the company, the latter of which some consider a crime against the State. In 2007, over a hundred lawsuits challenging the sale were still pending. Many of these lawsuits accused the Brazilian Development Bank (BNDES), which oversaw the privatizations, and Fernando Henrique Cardoso of undervaluing the company at the time of its sale. In 2010, Supreme Federal Court's minister Gilmar Mendes suspended all legal proceedings aimed at annulling the privatization process. This suspension will remain in effect until the Supreme Court delivers a final ruling on the matter.

=== Telebrás ===
In July 1998, Telebrás was privatized, which became the largest privatization in Brazilian history. The federal government raised 22.058 billion reais from the sale of 20% of the shares it owned, which represented the controlling stake in the company. Telebrás was divided into twelve companies, which were auctioned on the Rio de Janeiro Stock Exchange. These included three fixed-line telephony groups, eight mobile telephony groups, and one long-distance telephony group.

==== Scandal ====
In 1999, the newspaper Folha de S.Paulo published illegally taped conversations from BNDES telephones, raising suspicions that President Fernando Henrique Cardoso had been involved in an operation to favor a consortium during the Telebrás auction. The Federal Police refused to investigate the content of the conversations, arguing that they were obtained illegally and had no legal value.

At the time, some experts advocated for FHC's impeachment. Fábio Konder Comparato, a professor of commercial law at USP, and Celso Antônio Bandeira de Mello, a professor at PUC-SP, alleged that the president had committed a crime of responsibility by authorizing the use of his name to pressure the Previ pension fund to join Opportunity's consortium. Conversely, Celso Bastos, a constitutional law professor at PUC, argued that the irregularities were not serious enough to warrant an impeachment request.

In May 1999, the ruling parties united to block the establishment of a parliamentary inquiry commission (CPI) to investigate the case. With no formal investigation initiated, the opposition organized protests calling for the president's impeachment, but the case ultimately went unexamined.

The scandal resulted in the resignations of Luiz Carlos Mendonça de Barros (Minister of Communications), André Lara Resende (President of BNDES), Pio Borges (Vice-President of BNDES), and José Roberto Mendonça de Barros (Executive Secretary of the Chamber of Foreign Trade).

=== Railways ===
The privatization of the rail sector was presented as an alternative to "resuming investment in the rail sector." During Fernando Henrique Cardoso's administration, public railway lines were granted to the private sector for freight transportation operations. However, the concessionaires showed little interest in passenger transportation, which was almost entirely discontinued in Brazil.

In 1994, RFFSA had a debt of R$ 3 billion, much of it overdue or short-term, with no prospect of repayment, alongside labor liabilities totaling R$ 1 billion. Between 1996 and 1998, regional railway networks were auctioned and granted to private concessionaires, as follows:

- The Central-Eastern Network of the Federal Railway Network was privatized for R$ 316.9 million at an auction held at the Rio de Janeiro Stock Exchange, awarded to a consortium led by Companhia Vale do Rio Doce and seven other members;
- Sudeste Network, Brazil's busiest federal railway stretch, was privatized for R$ 888.9 million and awarded to MRS Logística;
- Oeste Network was auctioned for R$ 62.4 million and granted to the Novoeste consortium, led by the Noel Group;
- Tereza Cristina Network was auctioned for R$ 18,5 million;
- Sul Network was privatized for R$ 216,6 million;
- Nordeste Network was sold for R$ 15.7 million.

In 1998, RFFSA, already in the process of liquidation, incorporated Ferrovia Paulista S.A. (FEPASA). Later that year, FEPASA's network was privatized for R$ 245 million, with urban passenger transportation being transferred to CPTM.

=== Energy ===
Constitutional Amendment No. 6/1995 was approved during Fernando Henrique Cardoso's administration, allowing companies with foreign capital—provided they were incorporated under Brazilian law and had their headquarters and management located in Brazil—to obtain authorization or concessions from the Federal Government for the exploitation of mineral resources and hydroelectric power potential in Brazil.

==== Escelsa ====
On July 11, 1995, Escelsa (Espírito Santo Centrais Elétricas S.A.) became the first company to be privatized under Fernando Henrique Cardoso's administration. Its controlling stake was transferred to the private sector for R$357.92 million. The winner of the auction was the Parcel consortium, formed by the companies Iven S.A. and GTD Participações.

==== Light ====
In January 1996, Light was split into two companies: LightRio, based in Rio de Janeiro, and LightPar, based in São Paulo. This restructuring aimed to make the privatization of the Rio de Janeiro portion more attractive by freeing it from the obligation of a US$1,240 million debt owed by Companhia Elétrica de São Paulo (Eletropaulo). At the time, Light was responsible for distributing around 77% of the electricity in the state of Rio de Janeiro.

Light was privatized under the federal privatization program through an auction at the Rio de Janeiro Stock Exchange on May 21, 1996, for US$2.26 billion. The buyers of the company were the following companies and consortia:

- The largest share (34%) was acquired by the French state-owned company Electricité de France (EDF) and the American companies Houston Industries Energy and AES Corporation, each holding an 11.35% stake.
- Companhia Siderúrgica Nacional (CSN) (7.25%).
- BNDESPar, with 9.14%.
- Eletrobrás retained 30% of Light, meaning the Federal Government still held 39.14% of the company when including BNDESPar's shares.

In January 2000, BNDESPar sold approximately 20.24% of Light's total ordinary capital to EDF. In March 2000, EDF purchased an additional 9.23% stake from BNDESPar for R$506.3 million, increasing its total stake to 40%. In 2001, CSN sold its stake to EDF and AES for US$362 million.

==== Gerasul ====
In December 1997, all of Eletrosul's generating facilities were transferred to another company, Centrais Geradoras do Sul do Brasil (Gerasul). As a result, Eletrosul became a transmission company and changed its name to Empresa Transmissora de Energia do Sul do Brasil. Gerasul was sold to the Franco-Belgian group Tractebel on September 15, 1998, at the Rio de Janeiro Stock Exchange for 947 million reais.

==== Distributors ====
Between 1997 and 1999, the federal government federalized the distribution companies in Alagoas (Ceal), Piauí (Cepisa), Acre (Eletroacre), Rondônia (Ceron - Energisa Rondônia), and the interior of Amazonas (Ceam), but privatization only occurred in 2018.

Eletrobras entered into agreements for the shared management of companies owned by the governments of Mato Grosso do Sul (Enersul), Mato Grosso (Cemat), Paraíba (Saelpa), Rio Grande do Norte (Cosern), Maranhão (Cemar), and Pará (Celpa). These companies were privatized between 1997 and 2000.

During this period, state governments also privatized their energy companies. The government of São Paulo split its two energy companies (Companhia Energética de São Paulo and Eletropaulo) into several smaller entities to facilitate their privatization.

=== Banks ===
In 1992, 32 state banking institutions were operating in the country. That year, the Central Bank published a study highlighting the mismanagement and political interference within this network, which undermined monetary policy, control of public accounts, and regulation of the financial sector. In 1992, the Broad National Consumer Price Index (Índice Nacional de Preços ao Consumidor Amplo - IPCA) increased by 1,119.1%.

State governments used their banks for a wide range of budgetary and political tasks, from employing political allies to granting favored loans to the administration itself and allied businessmen, in addition to electoral purposes. There were also bad debts that were difficult to collect, resulting from financing failed ventures or lending to the controlling government itself.

Of the state banks that existed in 1996, ten were extinguished, six were privatized by state governments, seven were federalized for later privatization, five were restructured with Programa de Incentivo à Redução do Setor Público Estadual na Atividade Bancária - Proes resources, and only three did not take part in the restructuring.

The following banks were federalized: Banco do Estado do Amazonas (BEA), Banco do Estado do Ceará (BEC), Banco do Estado de Goiás (BEG), Banco do Estado do Maranhão (BEM), Banco do Estado do Piauí (BEP), and Banco do Estado de Santa Catarina (BESC).

In December 1997, the federal bank Banco Meridional was privatized in an auction held at the Rio de Janeiro Stock Exchange, with a premium of 54.97% over the minimum price. Banco Bozano, Simonsen won the auction with a bid of R$265.66 million.

Banco do Estado de São Paulo (Banespa), which was São Paulo's main development bank, was intervened by the Central Bank and began to be managed under the Temporary Special Administration System (Sistema de Regime de Administração Especial Temporário - RAET), which was in force until November 27, 1996. On that date, 51% of the shares owned by the state of São Paulo were transferred to the Federal Government. On November 20, 2000, Banespa was auctioned and sold to the Santander Central Hispano Group for R$7.05 billion, with a premium of 281%.

In December 2001, Itaú acquired Banco do Estado de Goiás (BEG) for R$655 million in an auction at the Rio de Janeiro Stock Exchange, with a premium of 121.14% over the minimum price.

Bradesco acquired Banco do Estado do Amazonas (BEA) in a privatization auction held on the Rio de Janeiro Stock Exchange for R$182.14 million in January 2002. The privatizations of some banks occurred only in the 1990s.

Some banks were privatized by the next government, such as Banco do Estado do Maranhão (BEM) in 2004 and Banco do Estado do Ceará (BEC) in 2005. Banco do Brasil took over Banco do Estado do Piauí (BEP), Banco do Estado de Santa Catarina (BESC), and Nossa Caixa at the end of the 2000s.

== Critics ==
In December 2011, the book A Privataria Tucana, by journalist Amaury Ribeiro Jr., accused the so-called “Era of Privatizations,” promoted by the government of Fernando Henrique Cardoso through its Minister of Planning, José Serra, of being a “veritable piracy practiced with public funds for the benefit of private fortunes, through so-called ‘offshores,’ shell companies in the Caribbean [...]”.

== Public opinion polls ==
In 1994, an Ibope poll on the privatization of state banks showed that 57% of the population was in favor of total or partial privatization, while 31% were against it. In 1995, another Ibope poll indicated that 43% of Brazilians supported privatization, and 34% were opposed.

In 1998, a survey by Latinobarómetro showed that half of Brazilians believed that privatizations had benefited the country. This rate was higher than the average for Latin American countries (46%). Support declined from that year onwards, reaching 33% when Lula took office. According to the researcher, support for privatizations grew again, peaking in 2009, when 50% were in favor. However, an Ibope poll released in 2007 indicated the opposite. The poll, which interviewed 1,000 voters, revealed that 62% were opposed to privatization, and 25% were in favor.
