= Presidency of Fernando Henrique Cardoso =

Brazilian presidential administration from 1995 to 2003

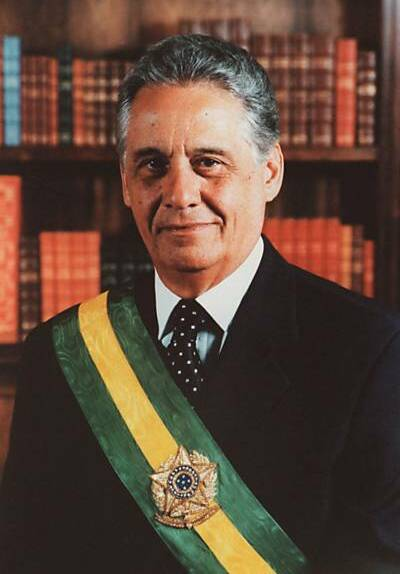
- Presidency of Fernando Henrique Cardoso; 1 January 1995 – 1 January 2003
- Vice President: Marco Maciel
- Cabinet: See list
- Party: PSDB
- Election: 1994; 1998
- Seat: Alvorada Palace

The presidency of Fernando Henrique Cardoso began on 1 January 1995, with the inauguration of Fernando Henrique, also known as FHC, and ended on 1 January 2003, when Luiz Inácio Lula da Silva took over the presidency.

The main achievements of his administration were the maintenance of economic stability with the consolidation of the Real Plan, the privatization of state-owned companies, the creation of regulatory agencies, the changes to the legislation governing civil servants and the introduction of income transfer programs such as Bolsa Escola.

The FHC government recorded GDP growth of 19.39% (an average of 2.42%) and per capita income growth of 6.99% (an average of 0.87%). He took office with inflation at 22.41% and left at 12.53%.

== Internal policy ==
=== Economy ===
During Fernando Henrique Cardoso's presidency, the Brazilian economy remained stable as a consequence of the inflation control achieved with the Real Plan. Brazil began to experience an economic expansion, especially in the automobile sector. Volkswagen settled in Resende, Rio de Janeiro, Iveco in Minas Gerais and Internacional/Agrale in Rio Grande do Sul. The average annual inflation rate, measured by the Broad National Consumer Price Index (IPCA), was 9.71% in his first term and 8.77% in his second. In 1995, the Ministry of Administration and State Reform, headed by Bresser Pereira, elaborated the Master Plan for State Reform (Portuguese: Plano Diretor da Reforma do Aparelho do Estado), which aimed to create conditions for the reconstruction of public administration on a modern and rational basis.

After the success of the Real Plan, the priority for FHC's administration was to stabilize the currency and promote economic growth. In 1995, the federal government submitted a series of measures for approval by Congress to amend the 1988 Federal Constitution and promote a structural change in Brazil's state structure to adapt it to the new circumstances of the global economy. The initiatives included administrative and social security reform, deregulation of markets, flexibility in labor hiring rules and abolition of state monopolies in the steel, electricity and telecommunications sectors.

In 1999, the tripé macroeconômico, which formed the new basis of economic policy and was composed of a floating exchange rate policy, fiscal targets and inflation targets, was implemented. Fernando Henrique Cardoso privatized numerous sectors considered deficient, such as telecommunications, electricity distribution, mining and finance. The opposition, especially the PT, contested these practices. In eight years, the minimum wage went from 70 to 200 reais in absolute terms. In real terms, its growth was 44.28%. The average GDP growth rate was 2.33% per year and the HDI (Human Development Index) rose from 0.753 in 1995 to 0.789 in 2000.

==== Crises ====
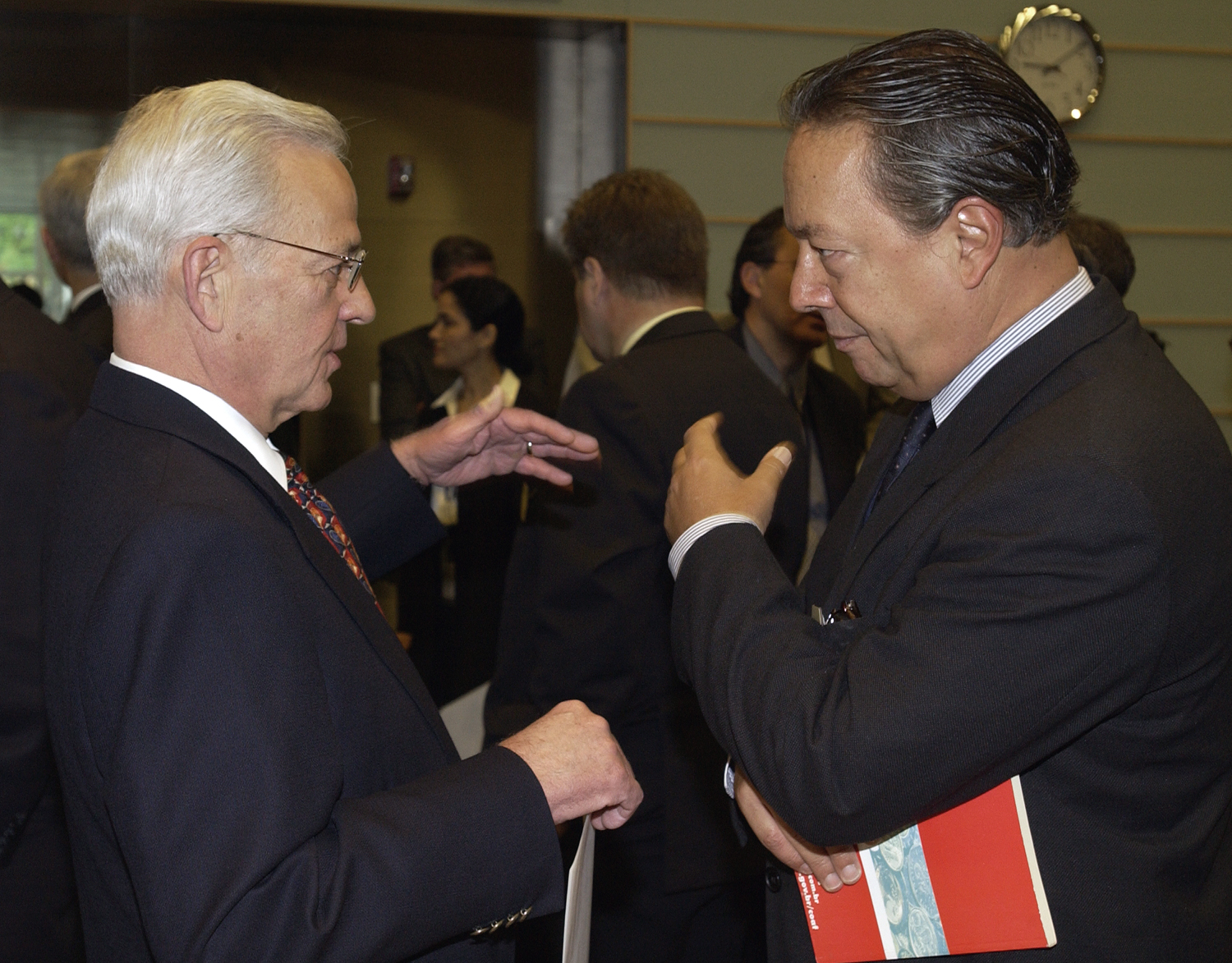
U.S. Treasury Secretary Paul O'Neill, left, and Brazilian Minister of Finance Pedro Malan confer ahead of the Spring 2002 meeting of the Development Committee

The FHC government faced several international recessions, such as the Mexican crisis in 1995, the Asian crisis between 1997 and 1998 and the Russian crisis between 1998 and 1999. Brazil was affected by the Argentine crisis, the terrorist attacks in the US on 11 September 2001 and the falsification of the Enron Corporation balance sheets. Internally, it faced a crisis in 1999 when the real depreciated significantly after the Central Bank abandoned the fixed exchange rate regime and adopted a floating exchange rate regime. In 2002, the prediction of Lula's victory in the next presidential election triggered a massive shortfall in hot money and increased the price of the dollar to almost R$4.00.

At every crisis that occurred in other emerging countries, the Brazilian economy suffered an abrupt withdrawal of speculative international capital, forcing Fernando Henrique Cardoso to ask the IMF for help three times. His supporters defended him by saying that upon taking office, Brazil was bankrupt and with practically no currency in dollars, requiring him to compromise on several fronts in order to stabilize the country and pass it on to his successor with properly organized finances.

==== Increase in public debt ====
During Fernando Henrique Cardoso's first term in office, the imbalance led to an increase in public debt which, at present values, stands at around R$22.8 billion, according to calculations based on data from the Central Bank. On 1 January 1995, the public sector owed R$153.163 billion at then current values. After three consecutive years of public deficit, the debt closed 97 at R$306.494 billion. Between 1995 and 1998, the public sector spent more than it collected, which created a primary deficit of R$7.22 billion. Considering the variation in the economy's basic interest rate since 1995, the interest expenses resulting from this indebtedness reached R$15.58 billion.

==== Fiscal Responsibility Law (LRF) ====
Approved by Fernando Henrique Cardoso on 4 May 2000, and published in the Federal Official Gazette the following day, the Fiscal Responsibility Law (LRF) requires that finances be presented detailed to the Court of Accounts (Federal, State or Municipal). If the accounts are rejected, an investigation into the responsibility of the Executive branch bodies and their members for any irregularities is launched, which can result in fines or bans on candidates running for election. Although the Executive is primarily responsible for public finances, the Legislative and Judicial branches are also subject to this rule.

The LRF also introduced a limit on personnel spending. The federal government is allowed to spend up to 50% of current net revenue, while states, municipalities and the Federal District can spend up to 60%. If spending reaches 95% of the established limit, it becomes forbidden to grant advantages, create positions and jobs and pay overtime. Before the law, the federal government had no mechanism to measure the country's total indebtedness.

=== Health ===
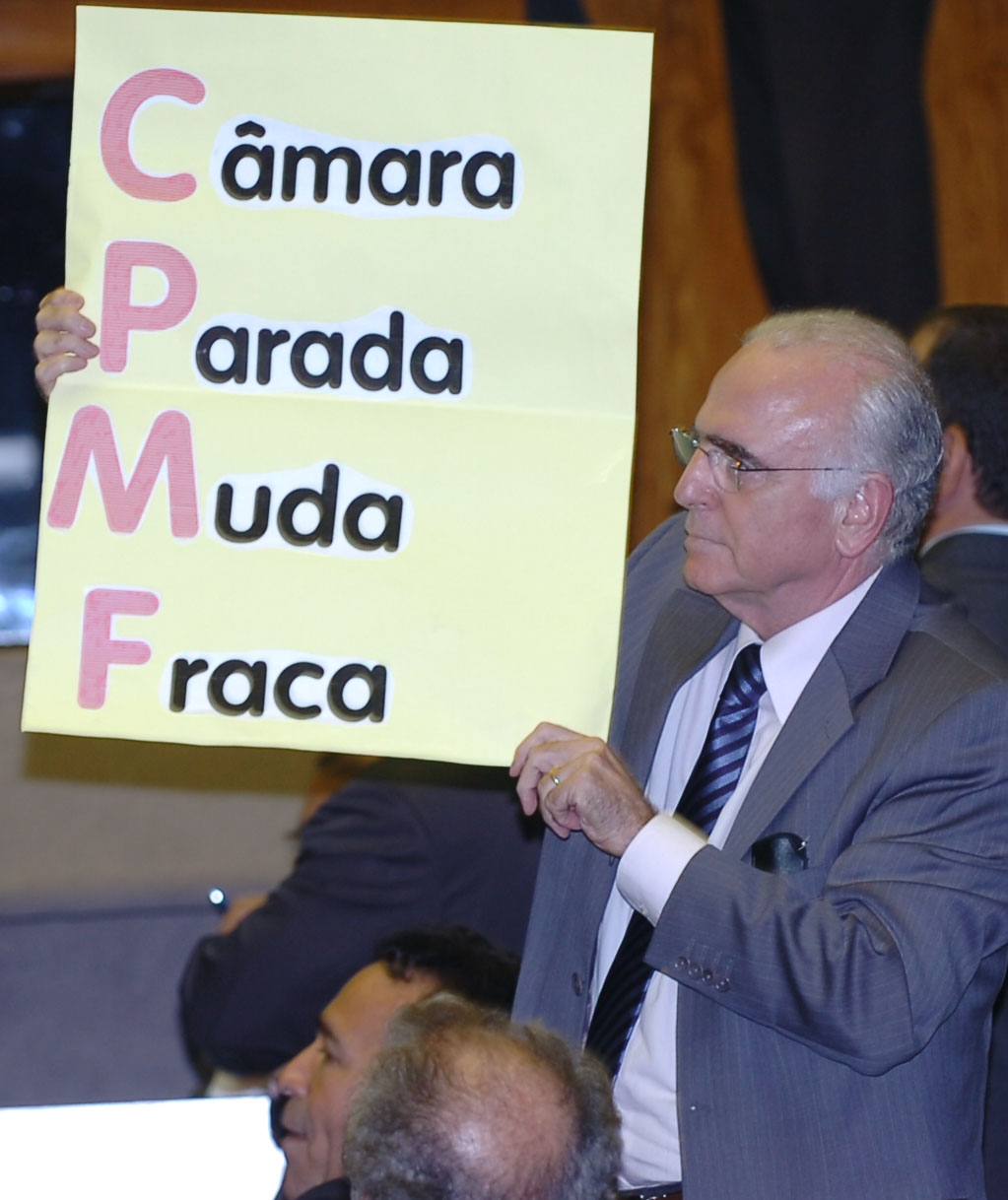
Paulo Renato Souza

Fernando Henrique Cardoso's administration was characterized by structural changes in the Brazilian health system. The Basic Operational Standard 96 (Norma Operacional Básica 96, NOB 96) and the Operational Standard for Health Care (Norma Operacional de Assistência à Saúde, NOAS) were published, which contributed to the decentralization of the SUS. The creation of the Provisional Contribution on Financial Transactions (Contribuição Provisória sobre Movimentação Financeira, CPMF) and the approval of Constitutional Amendment 29, which better defined the participation of the three spheres of government in the financing of the SUS and established minimum percentages of their revenues to be invested in public health actions and services, also stand out.

The Brazilian Health Regulatory Agency (Agência Nacional de Vigilância Sanitária - ANVISA) and the Brazilian Supplementary Health Agency (Agência Nacional de Saúde Suplementar - ANS) were created to improve Brazil's management and performance in health care, and to comply with the Health Plans Law, respectively. The period was characterized by intense debates on supplementary health and the regulation of health plans.

The approval of the Basic Care Budget (Piso de Atenção Básica - PAB), a regular and automatic transfer of federal funds, helped promote initiatives such as the Family Health Program (Programa Saúde da Família). The Project for the Reduction of Infant Mortality (Projeto para Redução da Mortalidade Infantil - PRMI), as part of the Solidarity Community Program (Programa Comunidade Solidária), the intensification of measures to combat cigarette consumption and the approval of Law No. 9.313, which determines the free distribution of antiretroviral treatment (ARV) to HIV/AIDS sufferers, are also noteworthy.

=== Environmental policy ===
Deforestation in the Amazon increased during the first administration of Fernando Henrique Cardoso. In 1995, PRODES/INPE recorded the highest rate since 1988, with 29,059 square kilometers of cleared area. As a solution, the government raised the legal reserve area for rural properties in the Amazon from 50% to 80% and banned the cutting of mahogany and virola for two years, which limited logging, one of the activities responsible for deforestation in the region.

In 1998, large and extensive fires occurred in Roraima, which led to the implementation of the Program for the Prevention and Control of Burning and Forest Fires in the Arc of Development (Programa de Prevenção e Controle às Queimadas e Incêndios Florestais no Arco do Desenvolvimento - Proarco), aimed at reducing the practice of burning areas for pasture and plantations.

Brazil participated actively in the development of the Kyoto Protocol, an agreement signed by the signatory countries of the United Nations Climate Change Conference, which set targets for reducing greenhouse gas emissions applicable exclusively to developed countries, considered to be the main contributors to the accumulation of emissions in the atmosphere since the Second Industrial Revolution. Developed countries also committed to financing the adoption of "clean" technologies by developing countries. The Brazilian delegation contributed to the creation of the Clean Development Mechanism, the basis for the creation of a global carbon market with the aim of stimulating the financing of projects to reduce greenhouse gas emissions.

The FHC administration created the Brazilian Climate Change Forum (Fórum Brasileiro de Mudanças Climáticas) to carry out studies, advise the president and mobilize society's attention to the phenomenon identified in successive IPCC reports. The main laws associated with environmental policies created during the FHC government were:

- National Water Resources Policy (Política Nacional de Recursos Hídricos - PNRH): established by the Water Law of 1997 and regulated by the National Water Agency (Agência Nacional de Águas - ANA), created in 2000. It introduced a national water resources management system and river basin committees and defined water as a public good and a scarce resource whose use must be charged to private individuals;
- Environmental Crimes Law: established sanctions that enabled the implementation and effective enforcement of the entire set of legislation related to the environment;
- National System of Conservation Units Law: defined 12 categories of Conservation Units with different degrees of preservation and sustainable use to improve their integrated planning.

=== Sports ===
Presidential decree formalizing Pelé's resignation as minister.

The FHC government was responsible for creating the Extraordinary Ministry of Sports in 1995, with Pelé as its first minister. Under his guidance, the General Sports Law, also known as the Pelé Law, was created to deal with the democratization of sporting activities, freedom to practice sports and safety for practitioners of any sport. In 2019, the ministry was abolished by Jair Bolsonaro, but was reactivated by the Lula administration in 2023.

=== Education ===
The FHC government created and implemented the Educational Information and Evaluation System (Sistema de Informações e Avaliação Educacional) in order to provide information and evaluate the quality of education at all levels and modalities. The government focused on universalizing primary education through the Fund for the Maintenance and Development of Primary Education and the Valorization of the Teaching Profession (Fundo de Manutenção e Desenvolvimento do Ensino Fundamental e Valorização do Magistério - FUNDEF), which allocated compulsory spending on education to primary education and distributed the funds to the municipalities. Important laws and documents designed to organize, plan and create coherence in Brazil's educational policy were produced, such as the Law of Guidelines and Bases and the National Curriculum Parameters in 1997 and the National Education Plan in 2001.

=== Social policies ===
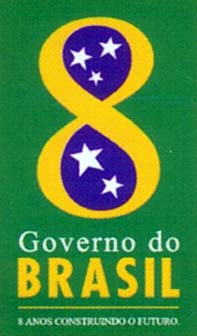
Logo used on papers in the last months of Fernando Henrique Cardoso's second term in office.

In 1995, the Brazilian delegation, led by First Lady Ruth Cardoso, participated in the Beijing Conference organized by the United Nations. The event established an action program for gender equality and set a timetable for monitoring its implementation every five years. In the same year, the first legislation on quotas for women in elections in Brazil was approved with a minimum percentage of women candidates.

The FHC government also launched a program to combat violence against women, promoting the expansion of specialized women's police stations and shelters. In the second term, gender discrimination in the job market was banned by law and sexual harassment was typified and penalized. The 1916 Civil Code was replaced in 2002 to reflect the principle of equal rights and obligations between men and women in family relationships, including reproductive planning. In 2002, FHC created the State Secretariat for Women's Rights (Secretaria de Estado dos Direitos da Mulher - Sedim).

In 1995, the Brazilian Gay, Lesbian, Bisexual, Travesti, Transsexual and Intersex Association (Associação Brasileira de Lésbicas, Gays, Bissexuais, Travestis, Transexuais e Intersexos - ABGLT) was created to unite the different organizations and groups of the movement nationwide. The first Gay Pride Parade, now known as the LGBT Pride Parade, was organized by the association.

The FHC government created Laws No. 10.048 and No. 10.098, which established issues relating to priority service and basic standards and criteria for promoting accessibility for people with disabilities or reduced mobility, respectively. The National Policy for the Integration of People with Disabilities (Política Nacional para a Integração da Pessoa Portadora de Deficiência) and the National Health Policy for People with Disabilities (Política Nacional de Saúde da Pessoa Portadora de Deficiência) were also implemented. The Brazilian Sign Language (Libras) was recognized as an official language.

In 1995, the International Labour Organization (ILO), in partnership with the federal government, sent a delegation to Brazil to study the problem of racial discrimination in the labor market. Initiatives such as the Brazil, Gender and Race Program (Programa Brasil, Gênero e Raça), aimed at combating racism in labor relations, emerged from this project. In the same year, the Zumbi dos Palmares March against Racism, for Citizenship and Life was held in Brasilia to commemorate the 300th anniversary of Zumbi's death.

The Interministerial Working Group for the Valorization of the Black Population (Grupo de Trabalho Interministerial para Valorização da População Negra - GTI) and the National Coordination for the Articulation of Black Rural Quilombola Communities (Coordenação Nacional de Articulação das Comunidades Rurais Negras Quilombolas - Conaq) were also created. In 1996, the FHC government launched the 1st National Human Rights Program (PNDH) with proposals aimed at combating racial discrimination. In the same year, discussions began on specific affirmative action for Brazil at the Multiculturalism and Racism Seminar.

=== Relations with the National Congress ===
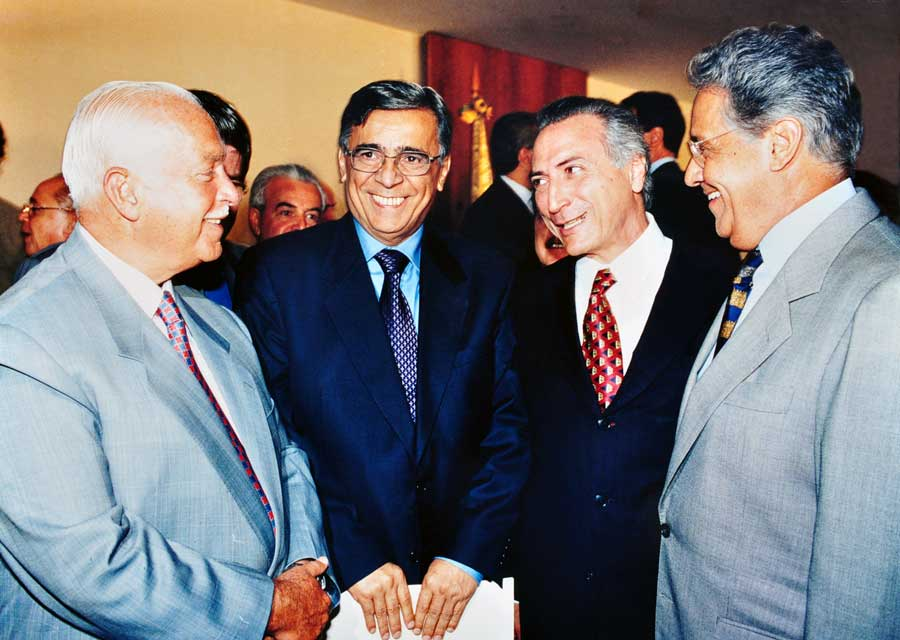
Fernando Henrique Cardoso talking to Michel Temer, then President of the Chamber of Deputies, and Antônio Carlos Magalhães, President of the Federal Senate

During his election campaign in 1994, Fernando Henrique Cardoso was supported by the Liberal Front Party (PFL) and the Brazilian Labor Party (PTB). Initially, his vice-president would be Guilherme Palmeira, a PFL candidate, but he was replaced by Marco Maciel after accusations of favoritism from a contractor. Upon winning the election, his coalition secured 36% and 30% of the disputed seats in the House and Senate respectively. After the Brazilian Democratic Movement Party (PMDB) joined, the ruling base increased to 57% and 58%. The PFL received the Ministries of Mines and Energy and the Environment, the PMDB received the Secretariat for National Integration, the PTB received the Ministry of Agriculture and the PSDB got the Ministry of Planning, Justice and the economic team that implemented the Real Plan.

At the end of 1995, Fernando Henrique Cardoso chose Francisco Dornelles, a deputy from the Brazilian Progressive Party (PPB), to occupy the Ministry of Development, Industry, Trade and Services, which he assumed in May 1996. FHC claimed that this represented a formal joining of the PPB in the government, but relevant members of the party including Paulo Maluf criticized him. In 1997, FHC renewed the alliance with the PMDB and PFL in Congress, supporting the election of a PMDB deputy from São Paulo, Michel Temer, and a PFL senator from Bahia, Antônio Carlos Magalhães.

In 1997, the constitutional amendment allowing re-election to executive positions was approved; the PSDB, PFL, PTB, PMDB and PPB supported the re-election of Fernando Henrique Cardoso. In 1999, the federal government supported the nomination of Michel Temer and ACM to the presidency of the Lower and Upper Houses of Congress respectively.

In 2000, there was a conflict between Fernando Henrique Cardoso and his allies in Congress. He promised that he would veto the candidacy of Aécio Neves for the presidency of the Chamber of Deputies and that he would support Inocêncio de Oliveira, a PFL deputy. He also claimed neutrality in the Federal Senate, where Jader Barbalho, from the PMDB and ACM's rival, was articulating his election to the presidency of the House. However, Aécio Neves formed a strong alliance in the Chamber of Deputies and FHC refused to intervene. The PFL threatened to leave the coalition, but FHC offered them an ultimatum: they could either retreat or he would exonerate the ministries that the PFL held at the time. The PFL remained in the coalition, but its relationship with the federal government deteriorated. In 2001, Aécio Neves was elected President of the Chamber of Deputies and Jader Barbalho was appointed President of the Senate.

In 2002, the PFL and PTB left the ruling coalition and handed over their ministries to launch presidential candidates. The PMDB still remained allied with the government and supported former Minister of Health José Serra's candidate for the presidency, with the PMDB deputy from Espírito Santo, Rita Camata, as his vice-president.

=== Impeachment attempts ===
Fernando Henrique Cardoso suffered seventeen accusations which could lead to his impeachment if proven. The complaints were filed more frequently during his second term, but were dismissed.

=== Appointments to the Supreme Court ===
As president, Fernando Henrique Cardoso appointed the following judges to the Supreme Court:

- 1997 - Nelson Jobim;
- 2000 - Ellen Gracie;
- 2002 - Gilmar Mendes.

== Foreign policy ==
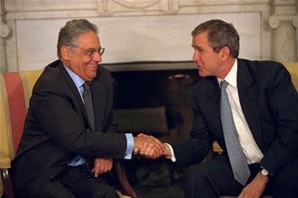
Fernando Henrique and US President George W. Bush during a meeting at the White House in March 2001

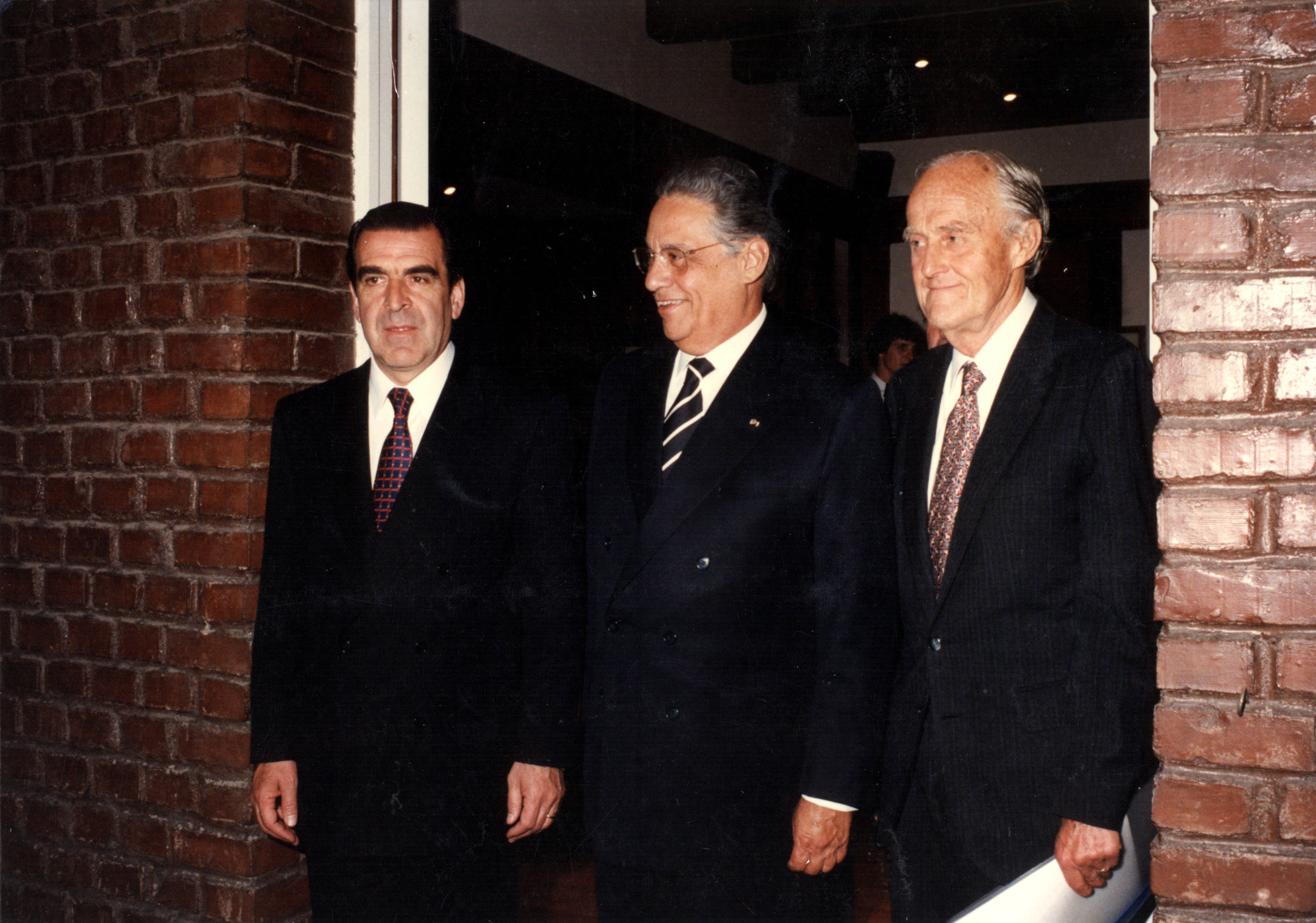
Chilean President Eduardo Frei, Fernando Henrique and Minister Edgardo Boeninger during PECC XII in October 1997

In 1998, the FHC government, supported by the Prime Minister of Cape Verde, Carlos Veiga, advocated for the expansion of the United Nations Security Council to include five more permanent seats. In 2002, Russian President Vladimir Putin signed a declaration of support for Brazil's inclusion onto the council, and became the first leader of a country with a permanent seat to do so.

During the 9/11 terrorist attacks, Fernando Henrique Cardoso phoned US President George W. Bush to express his condolences. A few days later, the Brazilian government's proposal to coordinate the Latin American response to the attack by invoking the Inter-American Treaty of Reciprocal Assistance (TIAR) was approved at the XXIII Meeting of Consultation of Foreign Ministers of the Organization of American States. In November 2001, FHC criticized the USA PATRIOT Act, and declared shortly after its enactment that "if, in order to defeat terror, we have to give up individual freedoms, guarantees of civil rights, the prohibition of the use of torture, then our victory will really be nonsense".

In October 2001, Fernando Henrique became the first Latin American president to address the French National Assembly. In his speech, he criticized developed countries, terrorism and defended the creation of the State of Palestine. A month later, he gave the opening speech at the UN General Assembly, where he again advocated for the creation of a Palestinian state that coexisted with Israel. The president said that the UN owed a "moral debt" to the Palestinians and that the creation of a new state was an "unavoidable task".

FHC's foreign policy was based on multilateralism, universalism and integration, especially on regional level. The strategy aimed to position Brazil as a global player on the international stage in an age of globalization. In 1998, Fernando Henrique Cardoso signed the Treaty on the Non-Proliferation of Nuclear Weapons.

=== MERCOSUR ===
Flag of Mercosur.

The FHC government prioritized MERCOSUR on the agenda as an innovative idea in South America, despite its open regionalism concept. The main objective of Brazil and the other member states of the bloc was to promote and guarantee lasting and sustainable development. Within the association, Brazil spoke out about the crises in Paraguay and Venezuela and the implementation of a democratic clause. It was also involved in the development of the free trade agreement between MERCOSUR and the European Union, in alliances with the World Trade Organization and in increasing bilateral relations with other countries. Fernando Henrique Cardoso aspired to insert the trade bloc into the international economy through open regionalism and to strengthen the association. However, MERCOSUR faced a crisis in mid-1998, aggravated by the devaluation of the real the following year.

Brazil has engaged in the search for new economic relations and strategic partners such as China and the United States. According to the FHC government, MERCOSUR was a strategy to attract the world's attention, enabling Brazil to participate more actively in the decision-making process on important world issues. Its objectives, characterized by presidential diplomacy during this period, were to increase external credibility and internal stability.

== Crises and accusations of corruption ==
=== Re-election ===
In 1997, the constitutional amendment allowing re-election to executive positions was approved. In the same year, wiretaps published by Folha de S. Paulo revealed conversations between congressman Ronivon Santiago and another voice identified in the newspaper as Senhor X. In the messages, Santiago stated that he and four other deputies had received 200.000 reais from the governor of Acre, Orleir Cameli, to vote in favor of the amendment.

Based on the recordings, the government's opposition, led by the PT, began to accuse Fernando Henrique Cardoso of purchasing the votes of members of parliament. He claimed that several politicians benefited from the amendment, as governors and mayors could also be re-elected, and that the wiretaps revealed the involvement of a governor and his deputies, not the federal government. The case was investigated by the Constitution, Justice and Citizenship Committee (Comissão de Constituição e Justiça e de Cidadania), whose session lasted only a few hours; it was addressed years later by the Mensalão CPI. After the investigation, deputies Ronivon Santiago and João Maia resigned their seats, supposedly to avoid being impeached. In both circumstances, Fernando Henrique Cardoso's involvement could not be proven.

=== Blackout crisis ===
Between 2000 and 2001, an energy shortage plan was implemented in several regions of Brazil, except for the South, which benefited from heavy rains. The severity of the drought in the reservoirs and the lack of investment in energy generation and transmission were the main causes of the problem. At the time, documents proved that the FHC government was aware of the power shortage risk, but the team said it was surprised by the advanced stage of the situation. With no management capacity, it was necessary to compulsorily reduce consumption.

The Brazilian government stipulated benefits for consumers who fulfilled the goal and punishments for those who failed to reduce their electricity consumption. It has also introduced a system of thermoelectric power stations that work as a second option during long droughts. Until then, Brazil was totally dependent on the generation of energy from water resources. At the end of 2001, rainfall levels improved and rationing was suspended in February 2002.

== Post-government impressions ==
Approval of the FHC government
Date	Event	Good/Great (%)	Bad/Terrible (%)
March 1995	Beginning of the administration	39	16
June 1996	Eldorado do Carajás massacre	30	25
September 1998	Re-election eve	43	17
February 1999	Devaluation of the real	21	36
September 1999	Economic crisis	13	56
June 2002	World Cup	31	26
December 2002	End of administration	26	35
	Average	30	28

In January 2003, journalist Fernando Rodrigues published an article about the preliminary approval of Luiz Inácio Lula da Silva's administration and the impressions left by the FHC government, and stated that "Fernando Henrique Cardoso had great peaks of popularity. However, judging by his beginning and his end, he left voters with the impression that he was an average president".

In April 2014, Datafolha published a survey on the influence of Fernando Henrique Cardoso, Lula, Joaquim Barbosa and Marina Silva on voters' decisions. Among more than 2,000 respondents, 12% said they would support a candidate backed by FHC and another 23% said they probably would vote. The rejection of a candidate nominated by him was 57%, the highest among the four possible electoral candidates.

In May 2014, Folha de S. Paulo published an index made by Datafolha on the evaluation of presidents since the 1990s. The results were compiled using a calculation that summarizes the popularity of each presidential term, with a scale between zero and two hundred points, where below one hundred points the evaluation was considered negative. Fernando Henrique Cardoso's first term was the fourth best with 134 points, behind Lula's two terms and Dilma Rousseff's first term. His second term scored 81 points, ahead only of the period when Fernando Collor governed the country.

== See also ==
- Presidency of Collor de Mello
- Samba effect
- Economy of Brazil
- History of Brazil (1985–present)
