= Artur da Távola =

Brazilian politician, journalist, and writer

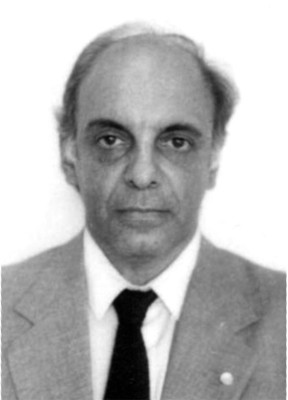

Personal details
- Born: 3 January 1936 Rio de Janeiro
- Died: 9 May 2008 (aged 72) Rio de Janeiro

Paulo Alberto Moretzsohn Monteiro de Barros (3 January 1936 – 9 May 2008), better known by the pseudonym Artur da Távola, was a Brazilian politician, Senator, journalist, writer, and a founding member of the Brazilian Social Democracy Party (PSDB).

Son of Paulo Moretzsohn Monteiro de Barros and Magdalena Koff. His maternal grandfather, André Koff, was a Syrian immigrant from Tartus, having immigrated to Brazil in 1900 and settled in Garibaldi, in Rio Grande do Sul. Along with other Syrians, he developed an important role in the commerce and social life of that city. On his father's side, he is a descendant of the traditional Monteiro de Barros family, representative of the Brazilian nobility and with great prominence in the country's politics and administration since its colonial era.

Távola began his career as a journalist and writer. He authored twenty-three books during the course of his career. He did not enter politics until 1960. He was forced into exile in Bolivia and Chile from 1964 until 1968 due to Brazil's military dictatorship, which remained in power from 1964 until 1985. Távola adopted his well-known pseudonym "Artur da Tavola," which was a reference to King Arthur. His adopted name allowed him to resume his career in journalism while the military dictatorship was still in power.

Távola returned to politics following the end of military rule in 1985. He participated in the 1988 constituent assembly and served as a federal deputy from 1987 until 1995. He was elected to the Brazilian Senate from Rio de Janeiro in 1994 and took office in 1995. He remained in office in the Senate until 2002.

Távola was a founding member of the Brazilian Social Democracy Party (PSDB), which governed the country from 1995 until 2002. However, Távola formally left the Brazilian Social Democracy Party in 1999 as the result of a dispute with Brazilian President Fernando Henrique Cardoso. Távola accused Cardoso, who was another founder of the PSDB, of abandoning the party's social democracy ideals for more conservative policies.

Artur da Távola died of heart disease in Copacabana, Rio de Janeiro, at the age of 72 on May 9, 2008.
