= A Privataria Tucana =

Book by Amaury Ribeiro Jr.

- Author: Amaury Ribeiro Jr.
- Original title: A Privataria Tucana
- Language: Portuguese
- Genre: Investigative journalism
- Publisher: Geração Editorial
- Publication date: 2011
- Publication place: Brazil
- Media type: Print (hardback and paperback)
- Pages: 344
- ISBN: 978-85-61501-98-3

A Privataria Tucana is a book written by journalist Amaury Ribeiro Jr., a former special reporter of weekly magazine ISTOÉ and daily newspaper O Globo who has won several Esso Journalism Awards.

The Portuguese title comes from "privataria" - a portmanteau combining "privatização" ("privatization") and "pirataria" ("piracy") - and tucano is a common nickname given to members of the Brazilian Social Democracy Party from one of the symbols of the party, the toucan bird.

== Synopsis ==
The book highlights documents that show supposed irregularities in privatizations that occurred during the administration of the PSDB under former President Fernando Henrique Cardoso and that friends and relatives of the PSDB's ex presidential candidate José Serra held companies in tax shelters and moved millions of dollars between 1993 and 2003.

It contains about 140 pages of photocopied documents trying to demonstrate that President Cardoso's Minister of Planning and later Minister of Health José Serra received kickbacks from businessmen that participated in the privatization process.

== Controversy ==
The books is one of the biggest Brazilian publishing phenomenon in recent years. Although not too explored by Brazil's mainstream media, it sold 15,000 copies in one day (the whole first edition becoming a best seller by Brazil's editorial standards) and 120,000 copies in a month. It produced waves in social media and among bloggers and alternative media publications, which questioned the silence of mainstream media.

José Serra called as soon as the book was published and strongly requested the bookselling company to set apart their entire stock of the book. According to an employee who preferred not to be identified, they refused to accede to Serra's request. According to the book, Serra's entire family was involved in a corruption scheme of diverting public funds to offshore financial centres in fiscal paradises and money laundering.

Dep. Delegado Protógenes Queiroz (PCdoB) presented a petition to install a Parliamentary Commission of Inquiry in the Chamber of Deputies to investigate privatizations carried out by the Cardoso administration (1995–2002). His motivation was the book.
