= Amaury Ribeiro Jr. =

Brazilian journalist

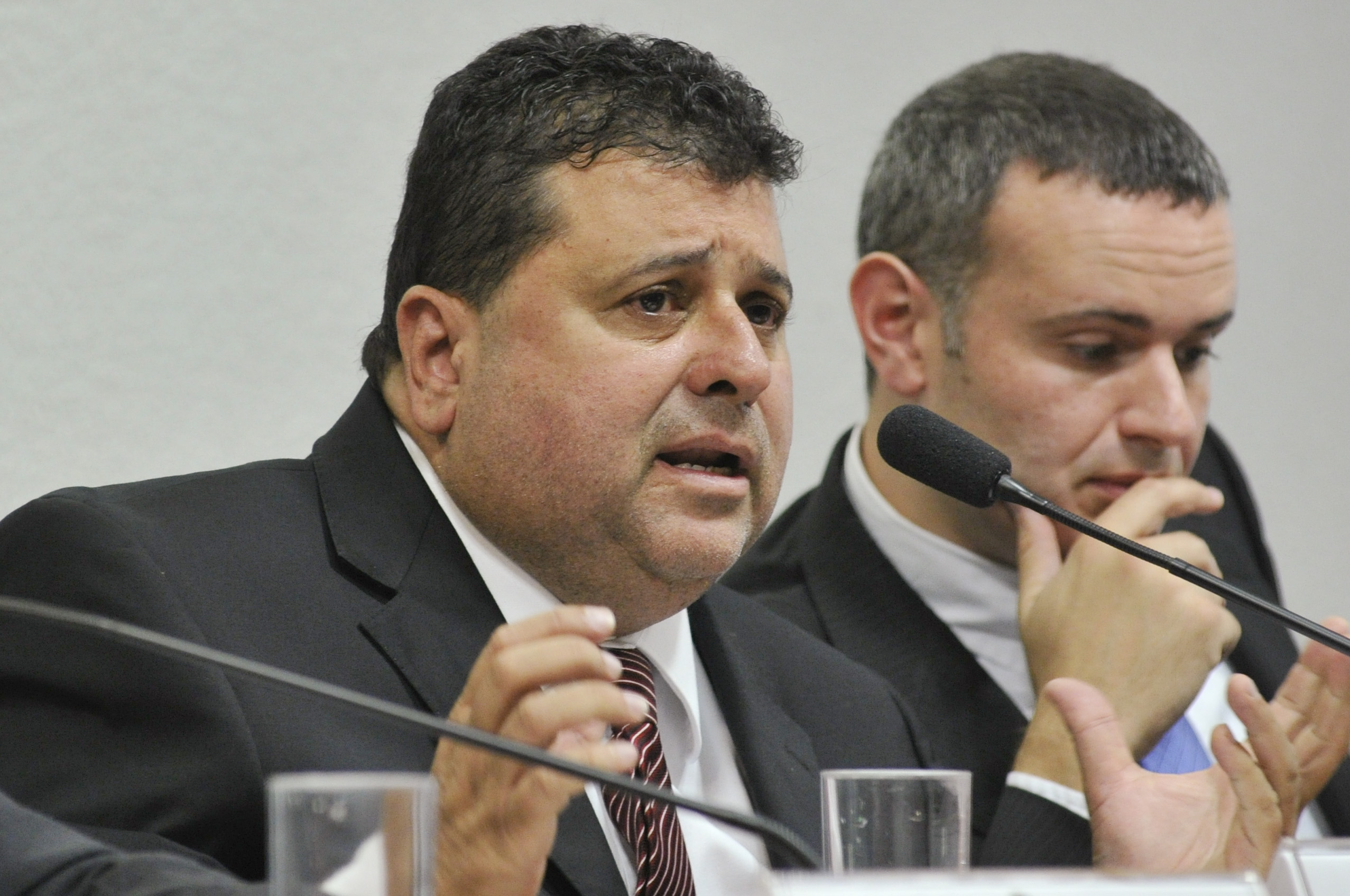
- Ribeiro speaking at a Parliamentary Commission of Inquiry conference in 2015
- Occupation: Investigative journalist
- Genre: Politics, current events
- Notable works: A Privataria Tucana
- Notable awards: Esso Journalism Award; Vladimir Herzog Award

Amaury Ribeiro Jr. is a Brazilian journalist, known for his works as an investigative journalist at newspapers and publications such as O Globo, IstoÉ, Correio Braziliense and Estado de Minas. He has won three Esso Journalism Awards and four Vladimir Herzog Awards. Today, he is part of the International Consortium of Investigative Journalists (ICIJ) and executive producer of journalism at TV Record.

In 2007, when working at Correio Braziliense, he was investigating homicides linked to the drug trafficking surrounding the Federal District, and was shot as an attempted murder. The suspected shooter was the nephew of Cidade Ocidental mayor Sonia Melo (PSDB) and Amaury had to stay under police care until he was transferred to the newspaper Estado de Minas, owned by the same group of Correio. He then focused on political subjects, specializing in money laundering.

He gained notoriety on 2011 after publishing the book A Privataria Tucana, in which he reveals documents about supposed irregularities in privatizations that allegedly occurred during the administration of the PSDB, the former president Fernando Henrique Cardoso and that friends and relatives of the PSDB's ex-presidential candidate José Serra, would have held companies in tax shelters and moved millions of dollars between 1993 and 2003.

== Bibliography ==
- 2011: A Privataria Tucana, Geração Editorial.
