= ExxonMobil Journalism Award =

Brazilian journalism prize

Esso
- Current: 57th Esso Journalism Award
- Awarded for: Best Brazilian Journalistic works
- Country: Brazil
- Presented by: Esso
- First award: 1955
- Website: www.premioesso.com.br

ExxonMobil Journalism Award (Prêmio ExxonMobil de Jornalismo), previously known as Esso Journalism Award (Prêmio Esso de Jornalismo), formerly known as Esso Reportage Award (Prêmio Esso de Reportagem), is an annual Brazilian journalism award given by the company Esso in Brazil.

== Background ==
The award was created in 1955 by Ney Peixoto do Vale, who took inspiration from the Pulitzer Prize.

The main award is a trophy and R$ 30,000 and goes to paper press only. Other categories are awarded with amounts of money ranging from R$3,000.00 to R$20,000.00, besides certificates. There are national and international categories. The winners are previously selected by a jury of 25 professionals related to the categories and later chosen by an award commission of five people.

== Categories and awards ==
- Esso Journalism Award - R$30,000.00 + certificate
- Esso Special News Broadcasting Award
- Esso Reportage Award - R$10.000,00 + certificate
- Esso Photography Award - R$10.000,00 + certificate
- Esso Economic Information Award - R$5.000,00 + certificate
- Esso Scientific, Technological and Ecological Information Award - R$5.000,00 + certificate
- Esso Special First Pege Award - R$5.000,00 + certificate
- Esso Graphic Creation Award - newspaper category - R$5.000,00 + certificate
- Esso Graphic Creation Award - magazine category - R$5.000,00 + certificate
- Esso Special Countryside Award - R$5.000,00 + certificate
- North Esso Regional Award - R$3.000,00 + certificate
- Northeast Esso Regional Award - R$3.000,00 + certificate
- Center-west Esso Regional Award - R$3.000,00 + certificate
- Southeast Esso Regional Award - R$3.000,00 + certificate
- South Esso Regional Award - R$3.000,00 + certificate
- Esso Award for Best Contribution to News Broadcasting
