= List of legendary creatures (L) =

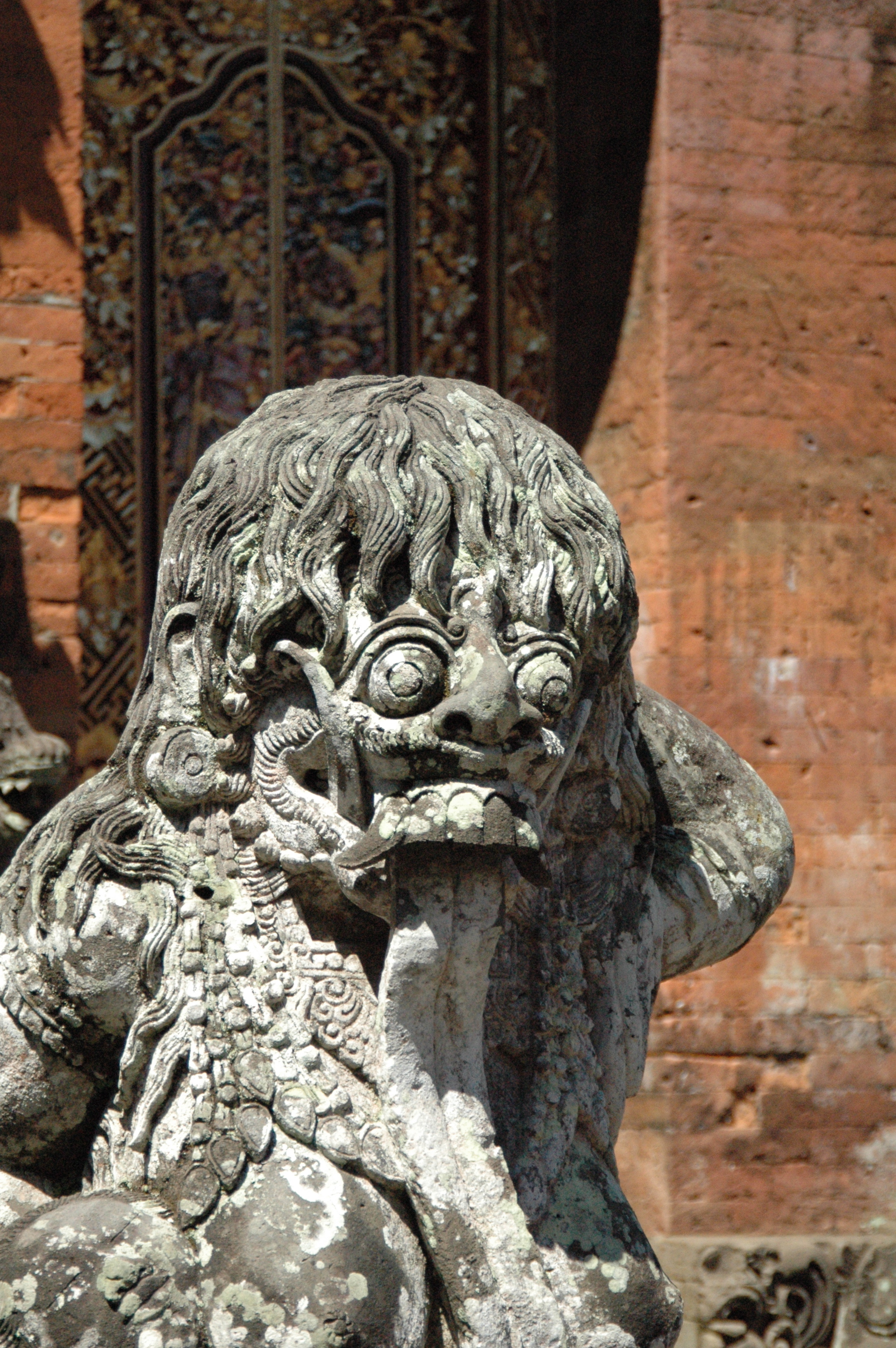
A statue of Rangda, the queen of the Leyak.

1. La-bar-tu (Assyrian) – Disease demon
2. Labbu (Akkadian) – Sea snake
3. Lady midday (Slavic) – Sunstroke spirit
4. Ladon (Greek) – Dragon guarding the golden apples of the Hesperides
5. Laelaps (Greek) – Enchanted dog that always caught his prey
6. Laestrygonians (Greek) – Anthropophagic giants
7. Lakanica (Slavic) – Field spirit
8. Lake monster (Worldwide) – Gigantic animals reported to inhabit various lakes around the world
9. Lakhey (Nepalese) – Demon with fangs
10. La Llorona (Latin America) – Death spirit associated with drowning
11. Lamassu (Akkadian and Sumerian) – Protective spirit with the form of a winged bull or human-headed lion
12. Lambton Worm (English) – Giant worm
13. Lamia (Greek) – Child-devouring monster with the upper body of a woman and the tail of a snake
14. Lamiak (Basque) – Water spirit with duck-like feet
15. La Mojana (Colombian) – Shapeshifting, female water spirit
16. Lampades (Greek) – Underworld nymph
17. Landvættir (Norse) – Nature spirits
18. Langmeidong (Meitei) – Half-human, half-hornbill creature
19. Lares (Roman) – House spirit
20. La Sayona (Venezuela) – Female ghost that punishes unfaithful husbands
21. La Tunda (Colombian) – Nature spirit that seduces and kills men
22. Lava bear – Miniature bear thought to inhabit the lava beds of south-central Oregon
23. Laukų dvasios (Lithuanian) – Field spirit
24. Lauma (Baltic) – Sky spirit
25. Lavellan (Scottish) – Gigantic water rat
26. Leanan sidhe (Celtic) – Vampiric fairy lover
27. Leimoniads (Greek) – Meadow nymph
28. Leokampoi (Etruscan) – Fish-tailed lion
29. Leontophone (Medieval Bestiary) – Tiny animal poisonous to lions
30. Leprechaun (Irish) – Cobbler spirit
31. Leszi (Slavic) – Tree spirit
32. Leuce (Greek) – White poplar tree nymph
33. Leucrota (Medieval Bestiary) – Crocotta-lion hybrid
34. Leviathan (Jewish) – Sea monster seen in Job 41
35. Leyak (Balinese) – Anthropophagous flying head with entrails
36. Libyan Aegipanes (Medieval Bestiaries) – Human-horse hybrid
37. Libyan Satyr (Medieval Bestiaries) – Human-goat hybrid
38. Lidérc (Hungary) – Magical chicken that transforms into a humanoid
39. Lietuvēns (Latvia) - Soul of a murdered person
40. Lightning Bird (Southern Africa) – Magical bird found at sites of lightning strikes
41. Likho (Slavic) – One-eyed hag or goblin
42. Lilin (Jewish) – Night-demoness
43. Lilitu (Assyrian) – Winged demon
44. Limnades (Greek) – Lake nymph
45. Lindworm (Germanic) – Dragon
46. Ljósálfar (Norse) – Light elves
47. Ljubi (Albanian) – Demoness
48. Llamhigyn Y Dwr (Welsh) – Frog-bat-lizard hybrid
49. Loch Ness Monster (Scottish) – Serpentine sea monster
50. Loki (Norse) – Trickster figure
51. Lo-lol (Abenaki) – Hideous monster
52. Lóng – Chinese dragon
53. Long Ma (Chinese) – Dragon-horse hybrid
54. Loogaroo (French America) – Shapeshifting female vampire
55. Lou Carcolh (French) – Snake-mollusk hybrid
56. Loup-garou (French) – Werewolf
57. Loveland frog (American Folklore) (Ohio) – Humanoid frog cryptid
58. Lubber fiend (English) – House spirit
59. Luduan (Chinese) – Truth-detecting animal
60. Lugat (Albanian) – Vampire
61. Lui-kong-tsiau (Taiwanese) – Thunderbird
62. Luison (Guaraní) – Werewolf, or cadaver-eating dog
63. Lusca (Caribbean) – Sea monster
64. Lutin (French) – Amusing goblin
65. Lyngbakr (Norse) - Whale-like sea monster
66. Lynx (Medieval Bestiaries) – Feline guide spirit
