= List of legendary creatures (H) =

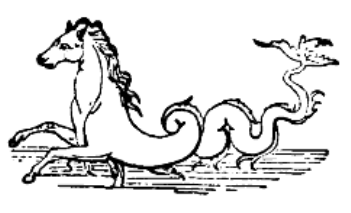
Hippocampus drawn from a fresco in Pompeii

1. Hábrók (Nordic) – listed as the "best" hawk
2. Hadhayosh (Persian) – gigantic land animal
3. Hades (Greek) – Ruler of the Underworld
4. Haetae (Korean) – dog-lion hybrid
5. Hag (Many cultures worldwide) – wise old woman who is usually a malevolent spirit or a disguised goddess
6. Haietlik (Nuu-chah-nulth) – water serpent
7. Halloi (Sanamahism) - natural maiden spirits of celestial origin
8. Hai-uri (Khoikhoi) – male cannibalistic partially invisible monster
9. Hakutaku (Japanese) – talking beast which handed down knowledge on harmful spirits
10. Hākuturi (Māori) – nature guardian
11. Half-elf (Nordic) – human-elf hybrid
12. Haltija (Finnish) – spirit that protects a specific place
13. Hamadryad (Greek) – oak tree nymph
14. Hamingja (Scandinavian) – personal protection spirit
15. Hamsa (Buddhist, Hindu and Jainism) – mystic bird
16. Hanau epe (Rapa Nui) – long-eared humanoid
17. Hantu Air (Malay) – shapeshifting water spirit
18. Hantu Demon (Philippine) – demon
19. Hantu Raya (Malay) – demonic servant
20. Harionago (Japanese) – humanoid female with barbed, prehensile hair
21. Harpy (Greek) – birdlike human-headed death spirit
22. Haugbúi (Nordic) – undead being who lives in its burial mound
23. Havsrå (Nordic) – saltwater spirit
24. Helloi (Meitei mythology) – celestial maidens, daughters of the Sky God Salailen
25. Headless Horseman (European) – humanoid spirit who haunts or kills
26. Headless Mule (Brazilian) – fire-spewing, headless, spectral mule
27. Hecatonchires (Greek) – primordial giants with 100 hands and fifty heads
28. Heikegani (Japanese) – crabs with human-faced shells, the spirits of warriors killed in the Battle of Dan-no-ura
29. Heinzelmännchen (German) – household spirit
30. Hejkal
31. Helead (Greek) – fen nymph
32. Hellhound (Many cultures worldwide) – underworld dog
33. Heracles (Greek) – gatekeeper of Olympus
34. Hercinia (Medieval Bestiaries) – glowing bird
35. Herensuge (Basque) – dragon
36. Hesperides (Greek) – nymph daughters of Atlas
37. Hidebehind (United States) – nocturnal forest creature
38. Hiderigami (Japanese) – drought spirit
39. Hieracosphinx (Ancient Egypt) – falcon-headed sphinx
40. Hihi (Japanese) – baboon monster
41. Hiisi (Finnish) – nature guardian
42. Hippalectryon (Greek) – a horse-rooster hybrid
43. Hippocamp (Etruscan, Greek and Phoenician) – horse-fish hybrid
44. Hippogriff (Medieval Bestiaries) – hybrid of a griffin and horse; a lion-eagle-horse hybrid
45. Hippopodes (Medieval Bestiary) – horse-hoofed humanoid
46. Hircocervus (Medieval Bestiary) – deer-goat hybrid
47. Hitodama (Japanese) – ghosts of the newly dead, which take the form of fireballs
48. Hitotsume-kozō (Japanese) – one-eyed childlike spirit
49. Hob (English) – house spirit
50. Hobbididance (English) – malevolent spirit
51. Hobgoblin (Medieval) – friendly or amusing goblin
52. Hodag (United States) – frog-mammoth-lizard hybrid
53. Hokhokw (Kwakiutl) – bird
54. Hōkō (Japanese) – dog-like Chinese tree spirit
55. Hó͘-ko͘-pô (Taiwanese) – a tiger spirit
56. Hồ ly tinh (Vietnamese) – nine-tailed fox spirit
57. Homa (Persian) – eagle-lion hybrid, similar to a griffin
58. Hombre Caiman (Colombian) – human-alligator hybrid
59. Hombre Gato (Latin America) – human-cat hybrid
60. Homunculus (Alchemy) – small animated construct
61. Hō-ō (Japanese) – rooster-swallow-fowl-snake-goose-tortoise-stag-fish hybrid
62. Hoopoe (multiple cultures) – near passerine bird common to Africa and Eurasia that features in many mythologies in those continents
63. Hoop snake (United States, Canada, and Australia) – snake which rolls by taking its tail in its mouth
64. Horned Serpent (Native American) – serpentine rain spirit
65. Hotoke (Japanese) – deceased person
66. Houri (Islamic) – heavenly beings
67. Hraesvelg (Norse) – Jötunn, who in eagle form, creates the wind by beating his wings
68. Hrímþurs (Nordic) – Rime or frost jötunn
69. Huaychivo (Mayan) – human-deer hybrid
70. Hudhud (Islamic) – a legendary hoopoe bird
71. Hue-tsiau (Taiwanese) – firebird
72. Huginn and Muninn (Norse) – pair of ravens associated with the Norse god Odin whose names mean Thought and Memory
73. Huldufólk (Icelandic/Faroese) – secret mound/rock dwelling elves
74. Hulder (Scandinavian) – forest spirit
75. Huli jing (Chinese) – nine-tailed fox spirit
76. Huma (Persian) – regenerative fire bird
77. Humbaba (Akkadian) – lion-faced giant
78. Hundun (Chinese) – chaos spirit
79. Hupia (Taíno) – nocturnal ghost
80. Hyakume (Japanese) – hundred-eyes creature
81. Hydra (Greek) – multi-headed water serpent/dragon
82. Hydrus (or Hydros) (Medieval Bestiary) – a water snake with various abilities
83. Hyōsube (Japanese) – hair-covered kappa
84. Hypnalis (Medieval Bestiary) – snake that kills its victims in their sleep
