= Salvadoran folklore =

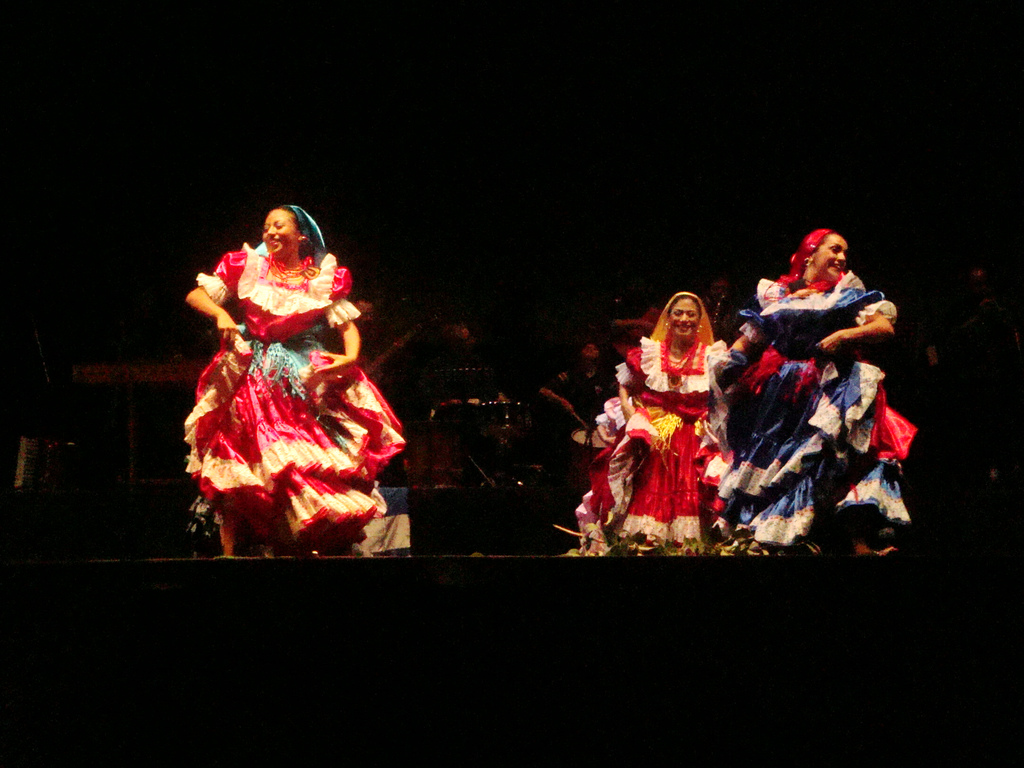
Folkloric ballet of El Salvador.

The folklore of El Salvador shares traits with the rest of the Mesoamerican region. The ancestral civilizations of the Mayans, Toltecs, Nahuas, among others, left their presence in many aspects of daily life.

The arrival of Europeans began an amalgamation of customs, traditions, and expressions. The colonizers attempted to eradicate local cultures, but the native cultures survived, and eventually coexisted with those of the Europeans. Examples of this combined culture include the adaptation of several Nahuat words into Spanish, the continued dominance of the Catholic religion, and the daily presence of corn in meals. The folklore of the two cultures combined to create modern hybrids.

== Material ==
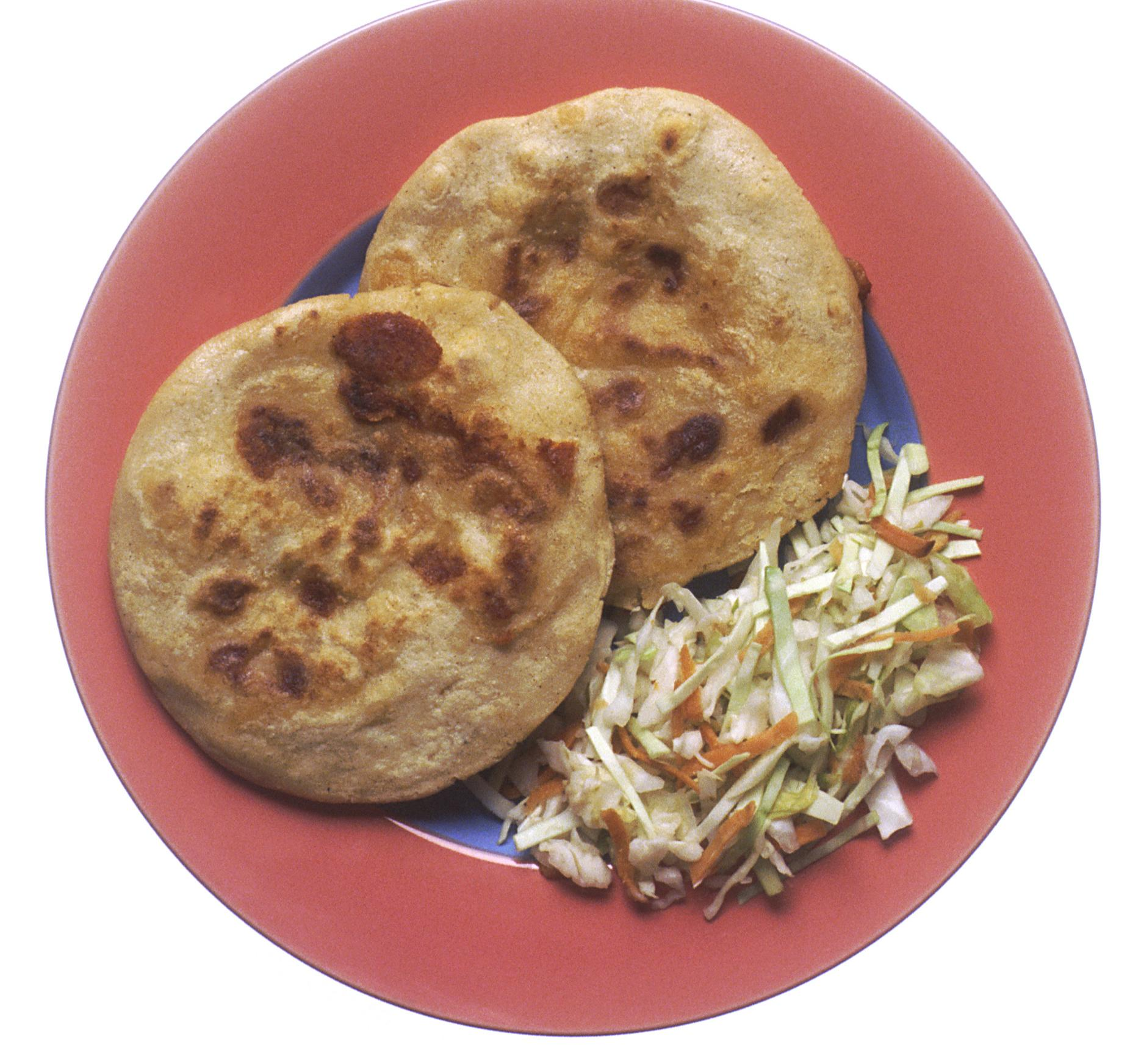
Las Pupusas. Traditional dish par excellence in El Salvador.

Material folklore includes physical and created items, such as foods, furniture, and traditional medicine.

In popular cuisine, corn-based dishes are common, including pupusas, atol shuco, tortillas, tamales, corn chicha, chilate, corn atol, torrejas, and cashew seed atol.

Drinks include hot drinks, such as hot chocolate and coffee, as well as cold drinks (popularly called "frescoes" or "soft drinks"), such as horchata, barley soft drink, and tamarind soft drink.

Popular sweets include coconut preserves, milkshakes, grapefruit sweets, and marshmallows. Jellies are often made of local fruits, such as the quince and guava.

Examples of common furniture items are hammocks, petates, tombillas, tecomates, bateas, comals, and pitchers.

== Social ==
Social folklore relates to festivals, brotherhoods, games, and markets. It can be divided into the following categories, with common examples:

- Traditional toys: the capirucho, the yo-yo, the trompo, marbles, and the kite.
- Group games: blind man's chicken, thief freed, donkey jumps, onion plucking, and mica.
- Rounds: the peregrina, Mrs. Ana, Chanchavalancha, Naranja Dulce, Ton-Ton, and Componte.
- Adult games: the deck, ribbon races, dice, and Nejapa Fireballs.
- Brotherhoods: the brotherhood of Izalco, Santo Domingo de Guzmán, San Antonio del Monte, Sonzacate, and Panchimalco.

== Spiritual-mental folklore ==
Spiritual-mental folklore relates to popular religious manifestations, popular literature, music, dance, oral tradition, idioms (popularly known as Caliche), and other related concepts.

=== Oral tradition ===
Salvadoran oral tradition includes legends and stories of pre-Hispanic, colonial or republican origin. These can be classified based on the character or location of the story:

- Mythical characters related to water: the Siguanaba, the Managuas, the Tepehuas (also known as arbolarios or hurracaneros), the Llorona, Chasca, the virgin of water, the Cuyancua, the golden crab.
- Goblins and other mythical characters: Cipitio, the Cadejo, the Dwarf, the Fair Judge of the Night, the Black Knight, the Squeaky Wagon, the Guirola Family, the Midnight Yeller, the Ashtray, the Tamale woman, the Partideño.
- Animals: uncle rabbit, uncle coyote, uncle tiger, monkeys.
- Enchanted places: Izalco Volcano, the Arch of Santo Domingo de Guzmán, Ilopango Lake, Tacuzcalco, the Pichichera, Sisimico Canyon.
- Saints and miracles: the Virgin of Candelaria, Our Lady Saint Anne, the Black Christ, the Lord of Charity, the Virgin of the Lava, San Antonio de Padua, Santa Lucía, the procession of the dead, etc.
- Kings, princesses and peches: the king, the princess and the three riddles, the godson and the peche.
- Mythologized heroes: Atonal, Atlacatl, Anastasio Aquino, Feliciano Ama and Farabundo Martí.

=== Patron saint festivities and popular celebrations ===
Each municipality is dedicated to a patron saint who is celebrated annually. Among the most important:

- Patron saint festivities (Fiestas agostinas) dedicated to Savior of the World known as August Festivals.
- July Festivals (Fiestas Julias) dedicated to Saint Anne, in the city of the same name.
- Patron saint festivities of San Miguel in honor of the Virgin of Peace where the Carnival of San Miguel is celebrated.

Some popular religious celebrations include Roodmas, Holy Week, the Talcigüines, and the Day of the Animas.

=== Dances and musical ===
El Salvador has around thirty dances. Among the most popular are: dance of the historians, the Chapetones, the Partesana, the Torito Pinto, the Tiger and the Deer, the Negritos, the Giantess, the feathered ones, and the Cortadoras.

Traditional musical instruments include the Caramba, the Eunuch flute, the Sacabuche, and the Jawbone.

== Bibliography ==
- Dirección de Patrimonio Cultural (1993). Tradición oral de El Salvador. San Salvador : Dirección de Publicaciones e Impresos.
- Ministerio de Cultura y Comunicaciones (1985). Etnografía de El Salvador. San Salvador : Dirección de Publicaciones.
- Ministerio de Educación (1994). Historia de El Salvador Tomo I. México D.F. : Comisión Nacional de los Libros de Textos Gratuitos.
