= El Hombre Caimán =

Legendary creature in Colombia

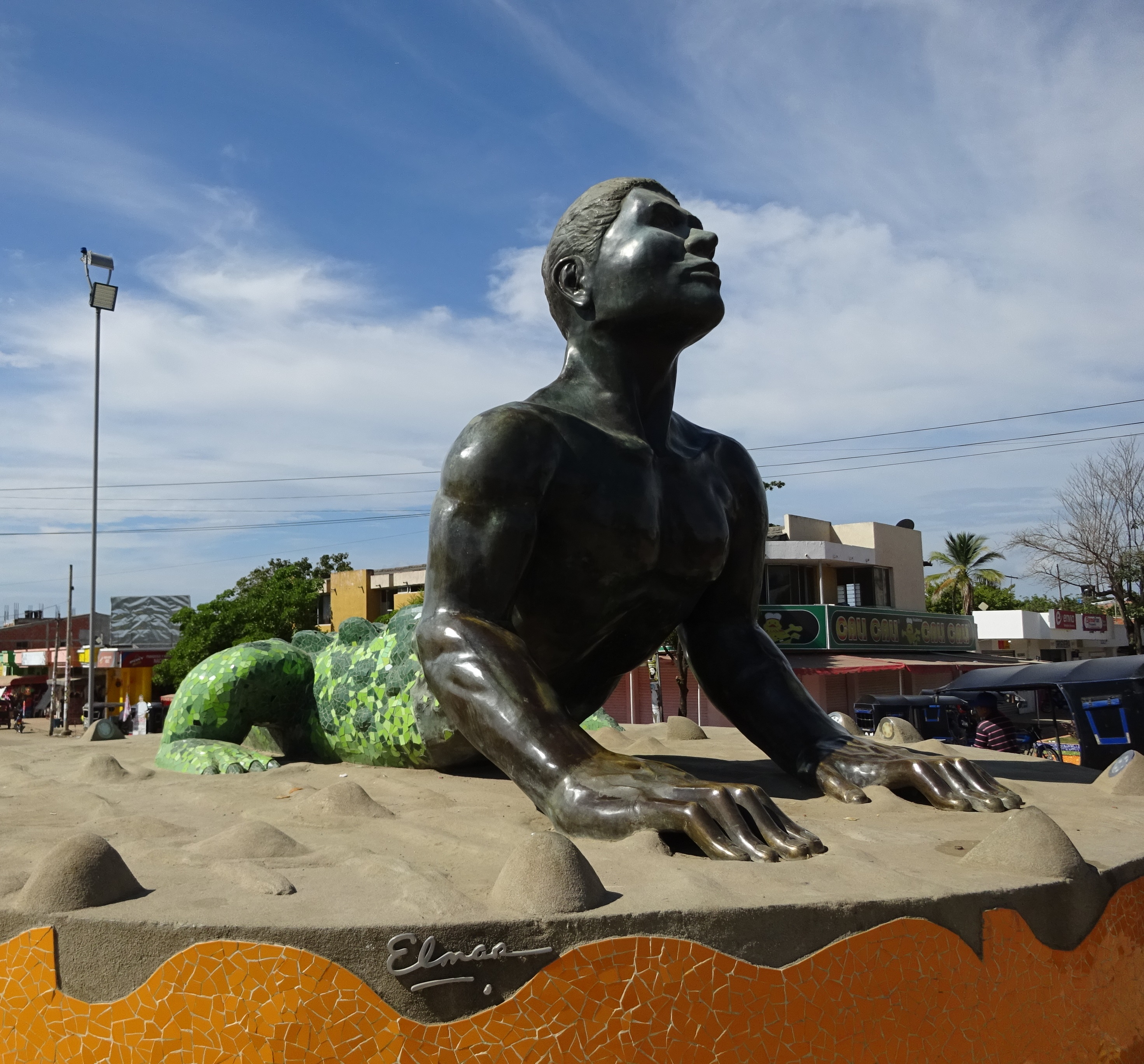
Monument of Hombre Caimán in Plato, Magdalena.

El Hombre Caimán (The Alligator Man) is an urban legend from the Caribbean coast of Colombia that takes place in the riverside town of Plato: Saúl Montenegro's passion for spying on naked women turned into a being with the head of a man and the body of an alligator. The story was allegedly reported in the press in the 1940s.

== Legend ==
Montenegro liked to watch the women who bathed in the waters of the Magdalena River but feared being caught watching from among the trees. He went to an indigenous woman (also called a bruja "witch" or piache "shaman" (Note: Carib piache or pajé (from Tupi) signify a medicine man.)) in Alta Guajira for a potion to turn himself into an alligator so that the bathers would not suspect him and he could admire them as much as he wished. The witch gave him two potions: a red one that turned him into an alligator, and a white one that turned him back. Montenegro enjoyed this for some time. (Note: Plato municipality website, apud the Cromos magazine article)

On one occasion, the friend (drinking pal) who usually accompanied the peeping tom was unavailable, and the duty of splashing the white medicine to turn the caiman back into human fell on a substitute. But as he was not used to confronting the man in his alligator form, he got scared and smashed the bottle of white potion, so that only some of the liquid got splashed on Saúl's head, so his head returned to human, but his body remained alligator. After this, women were too afraid to bathe in the river.

To bring peace to the village of Plato, it was decided the fishermen would try to hunt the alligator man down. They came and clubbed him brutally, but fearing retribution, these people became afraid to leave their homes. Montenegro was called a lizard ("lagarto") and was ostracized, and only his mother dared approach him. Every night she came to the river (to the secret wading spot between the rocks), to deliver him his favorite foods: cheese, whey, fish, and cassava (yuca) dishes, with an occasional small bottle of rum. The mother tried all sorts of remedies from having his godparents make the sign of the cross, to the parish priest's blessings, even burying a black cat alive at midnight on Good Friday as this was supposed to dispel evil. Nothing worked. So the mother embarked on the journey to find the indigenous shaman woman, only to discover she had died. The mother, returning to Plato three years later, died one night (of great grief) where she delivered her son's food.

Alligator Man was left alone, with no-one to take care of him. He decided to let the river carry him out to sea at Bocas de Ceniza the mouth of the Magdalena River, near Barranquilla. Since then, the fishermen of the lower Magdalena, from Plato to Bocas de Ceniza, are still on a lookout to hunt for him in the river and the swampy riverbanks.

This story allegedly was published during the 1940s in the local paper La Prensa of Barranquilla, but the newspaper is defunct, and informants in recent years could not be found who remembered reading the newspaper clippings.

== In popular culture ==
A festival of Alligator Man is held annually in Plato. A square and a monument have been built in his honor and are part of the local cultural heritage. His legend is immortalized in the song "Se va el caimán" by Barranquilla musician José María Peñaranda.

== See also ==
- La Bolefuego – Apparition in South American folklore
- Cadejo – Creature in Central American folklore
- Calchona
- Cegua – Supernatural character from Central American folklore
- La Llorona – Vengeful ghost in Latin American folklore
- Mohan (legendary) – Mythological figures in South and Central American folklore
- Patasola – Vampire-like creature in South American folklore
