= Vengeful ghost =

Spirit of a dead person who returns from the afterlife to seek revenge

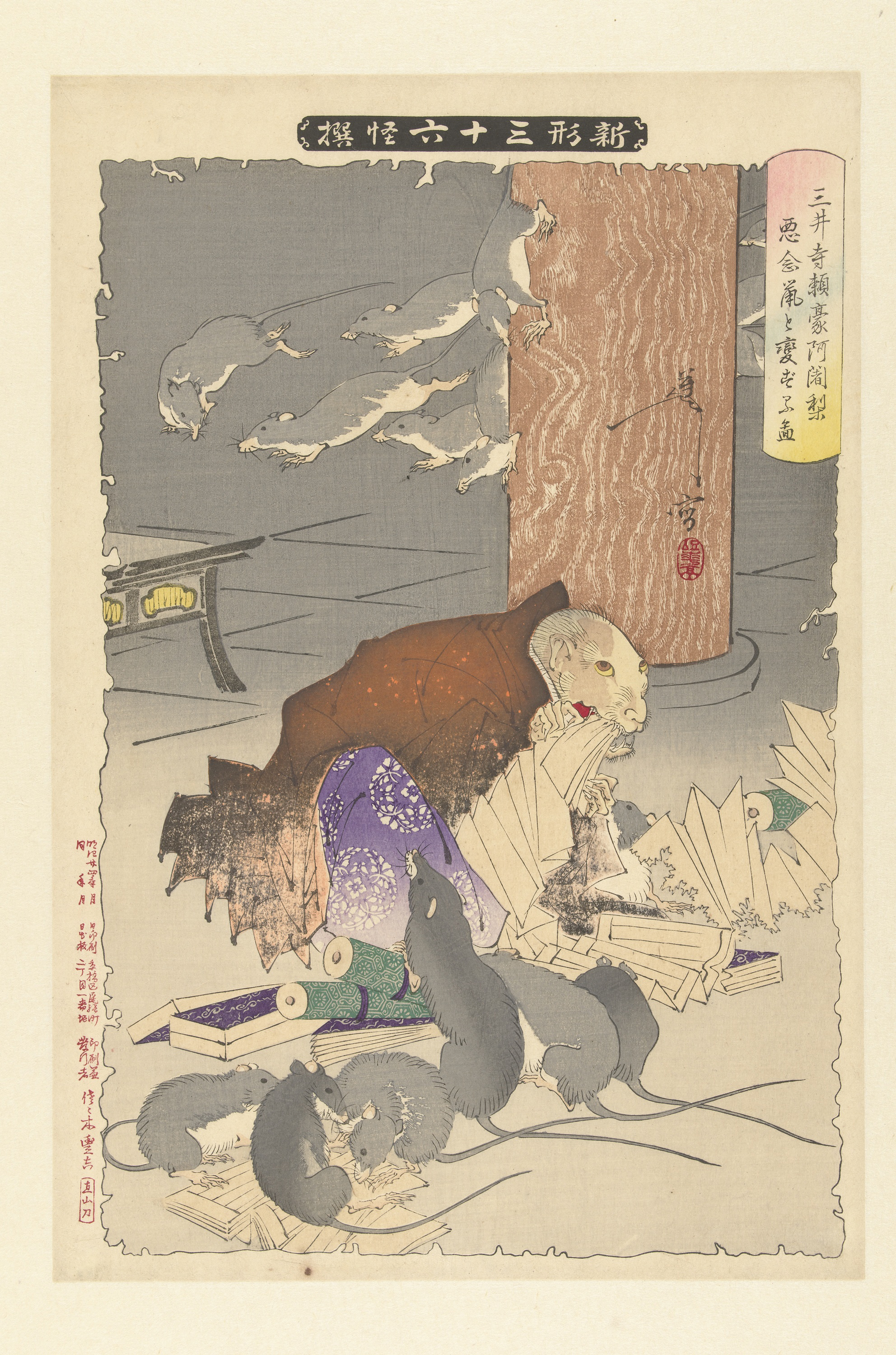
- The onryō of the priest Raigō returns as a rat plague and destroys the Mii Temple. T. Yoshitoshi 1891

Creature information
- Other name: Vengeful spirit
- Grouping: Legendary creature
- Sub grouping: Ghost, undead
- Similar entities: Revenant

Origin
- Region: The Americas, Europe, Asia, Africa

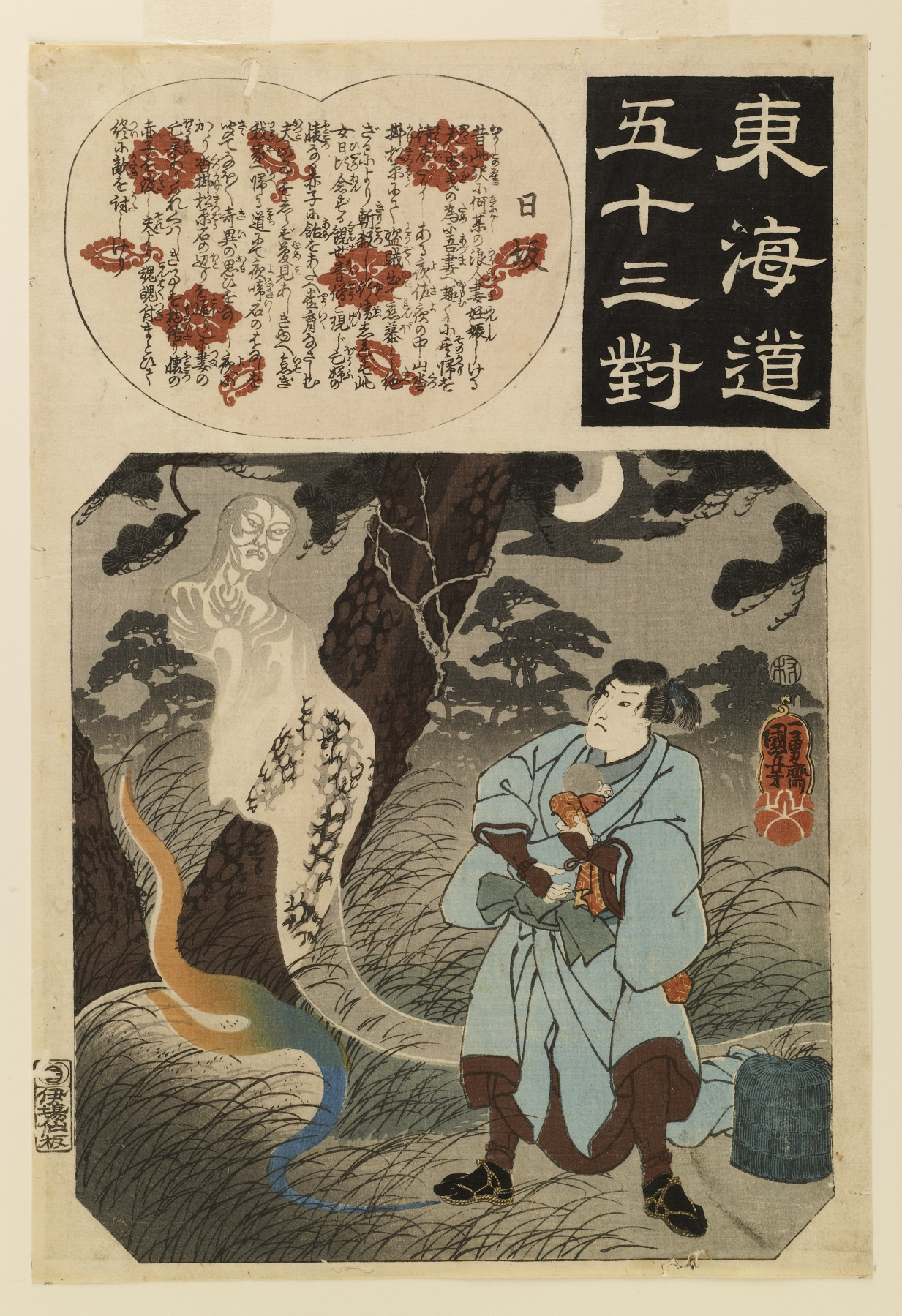
As a husband passes by the place where his pregnant wife was brutally murdered, her ghost appears and hands their child to him. She then tells him the story of her murder and assists him as he takes revenge for her death. Utagawa Kuniyoshi 1845

In mythology and folklore, a vengeful ghost or vengeful spirit is said to be the spirit of a dead person who returns from the afterlife to seek revenge for a cruel, unnatural or unjust death. In certain cultures where funeral and burial or cremation ceremonies are important, such vengeful spirits may also be considered as unhappy ghosts of individuals who have not been given a proper funeral.

== Cultural background ==
The concept of a vengeful ghost seeking retribution for harm that it endured as a living person goes back to ancient times and is part of many cultures. According to such legends and beliefs, they roam the world of the living as restless spirits, seeking to have their grievances redressed, and may not be satisfied until they have succeeded in punishing either their murderers or their tormentors.

In certain cultures vengeful ghosts are mostly female, said to be women that were unjustly treated during their lifetime. Such women or girls may have died in despair or the suffering they endured may have resulted in early death caused by the ill-treatment or torture they were subject to.

Exorcisms and appeasement are among the religious and social customs practiced by various cultures in relation to the vengeful ghost. The northern Aché people group in Paraguay cremated old people thought to harbor dangerous vengeful spirits instead of giving them a customary burial. In cases where the person has been killed and the body disposed of unceremoniously, the cadaver may be exhumed and reburied according to the proper funerary rituals in order to appease the spirit. Another option is to salt and burn their remains (bones).

== Media ==
Vengeful ghosts have been featured in many contemporary movies of different countries such as Candyman, The Grudge, The Pit and the Pendulum, Mostly Ghostly: Who Let the Ghosts Out?, Poltergeist, Ghost, The Fog, High Plains Drifter, The Ward, Cassadaga, Kaal, Left for Dead, Bees Saal Baad, Darling, ParaNorman, Ragini MMS, Stree, Dark Shadows and the Troublesome Night film series, as well as the television series Spooky Valentine, Spooky Nights, Charmed, Ghost Whisperer, Supernatural and the popular Thai television soap opera Raeng Ngao and a popular K-television series Hotel Del Luna. They are also part of the theme of novels such as Tamír Triad and Tamsin, comic books such as the character the Gentleman Ghost, animated television series like Danny Phantom and adventure games such as the Chzo Mythos. Finally, there is also a female, controllable character called Vengeful Spirit in the MOBA videogame Dota 2.

== Examples ==
=== Africa ===
- Madam Koi Koi is the ghost of a female school teacher in African urban legend who haunts boarding schools after some students caused her death.

=== Ancient Rome ===
- Lemures in Roman mythology are the wandering and vengeful spirits of those not afforded proper burial, funeral rites or affectionate cult by the living.

=== Ancient Greece ===
- Keres (Κῆρες), spirits of violent or cruel death in Greek mythology
- Vrykolakas, a creature similar to a zombie

=== United Kingdom ===
- The Green Lady, a restless female spirit said to haunt certain locations in Scotland such as Crathes Castle, Knock Castle (Isle of Skye) and Ashintully Castle. In some tales she was murdered in a green dress, and then stuffed unceremoniously up the chimney by a servant. It is said that her footsteps can still be heard as she walks the castle in sadness.

=== Eastern Europe ===
- Drekavac
- Kukudh
- Lugat
- Moroi
- Strigoi
- Strzyga

=== Jewish culture ===
- Dybbuk, a malicious spirit that possesses living people

=== China and Vietnam ===
- Mogwai, a vengeful ghost or demon in Chinese mythology
- Nü gui, (Chinese: 女鬼; pinyin: nǚ guǐ; lit. 'female ghost') a vengeful female ghost of Chinese folklore. She appears with untied hair.
- Yuan gui (Chinese: 冤鬼; pinyin: yuān guǐ; lit. 'ghost with grievance'), the spirits of persons who have died wrongful deaths

=== India ===
- Chudail (Urdu: چڑیل, Devanagari: चुड़ेल), a female ghost of Indian folklore, well known in North India and Pakistan. This spirit is said to originate in a woman who died either in childbirth, in pregnancy or during her menstruation, in a state of ritual impurity.

=== Japan ===
- Onryō, a generic name in Japanese folklore for ghosts (yūrei) who come back from purgatory for a wrong done to them during their lifetime. Onryō are mostly women and often manifest themselves in physical rather than spectral form.
  - Funayūrei (船幽霊 or 舟幽霊; lit. "boat spirit"), ghosts that have become vengeful spirits at sea. They are mentioned in the folklore of various areas of Japan.
  - Goryō, a certain type of spirits, usually the ghosts of martyrs, from Japanese mythology
  - Kuchisake-onna, the vengeful ghost of a woman mutilated by her husband

=== Korea ===
- Gwisin
  - Korean virgin ghost

=== Latin America ===
- Dama Branca, also known as Mulher de Branco, meaning 'Woman in White' in Portuguese, is the ghost of a young woman who died of childbirth or violent causes in Brazilian mythology.
- Corpo-Seco ('Dried Corpse'), is the ghost of a man who was so evil when alive his soul was rejected by God and the Devil and so was cursed to haunt the living as an undead corpse in Brazilian mythology.
- La Llorona, also known as 'the Weeping Woman'; can be a female spirit from Mexico who drowned her own children because her husband cheated on her with another woman and subsequently left her.
- La Sayona, a female spirit who believed her husband had an affair with her mother in Venezuela and Colombia
- Patasola, a female spirit from South America that appears as a beautiful woman. She attracts men and lures them to the depths of the rainforest, where she turns into a beast and devours the man.
- Sihuanaba, a female spirit who had an affair and attacks unfaithful men in El Salvador and Guatemala
- The Silbón, a young man who killed his father after the father would rape the youth's wife. His grandfather then cursed him to roam the Earth forever with his father's bones, so the youth's ghost kills people if they act like either of the men who hurt him, mostly womanizers and drunks.
- Tulevieja a female spirit from Panama and Costa Rica similar to the Llorona from Mexico is a young beautiful woman who is cursed with having to wander and search for the child she abandoned by the river for all eternity. As punishment she was transformed into a hideous beast with bat wings, engorged leaking breasts, hairy inverted talons for legs and feet, a face full of oozing hairy holes, wild matted hair, and wearing an old tule hat.

=== North America ===
- Chindi, a vengeful ghost that causes dust devils in Navajo mythology

=== Southeast Asia ===
- Dambir ow, in the mythology of the Asmat people of western New Guinea, are ghosts of women who die in labor. Anthropologist Jan Pouwer writes that they have "frightening looks, a sharp nose, sharp teeth, long nails, and eyes as red as their hair. They take revenge on men by carrying them to the underworld, where they torture them to death with thorns."
- Krasue (Thai: กระสือ), known as Ap (Khmer: អាប) in Cambodia, as Kasu in Laos, and Palasik, Kuyang, and Leyak in Indonesia, a nocturnal female spirit of Southeast Asian folklore
- Kuntilanak
- Phi Tai Hong (Thai: ผีตายโหง), the restless spirit of a person that suffered a violent or cruel death in Thai folklore
- Phi Tai Thang Klom (ผีตายทั้งกลม), also known as Phi Tai Thong Klom (ผีตายท้องกลม), a Thai ghost, is the wrathful spirit of a pregnant woman who committed suicide after being subsequently betrayed and abandoned by her lover.
- Suanggi, a malevolent spirit in the folklore of the Maluku Islands, Indonesia
- Sundel bolong, in Indonesian mythology, is the ghost of a woman who died when she was pregnant and gave birth in her grave so that the baby came out from her back, where she has a large wound.
- Wewe Gombel, a female ghost in Indonesian mythology. It is said that she kidnaps children.

== See also ==
- Ghost
- Ghosts in Chinese culture
- Ghosts in Vietnamese culture
- Hun and po
- Ju-on (franchise)
- Revenant
- Yotsuya Kaidan
