= El Silbón =

Legendary character from Venezuela

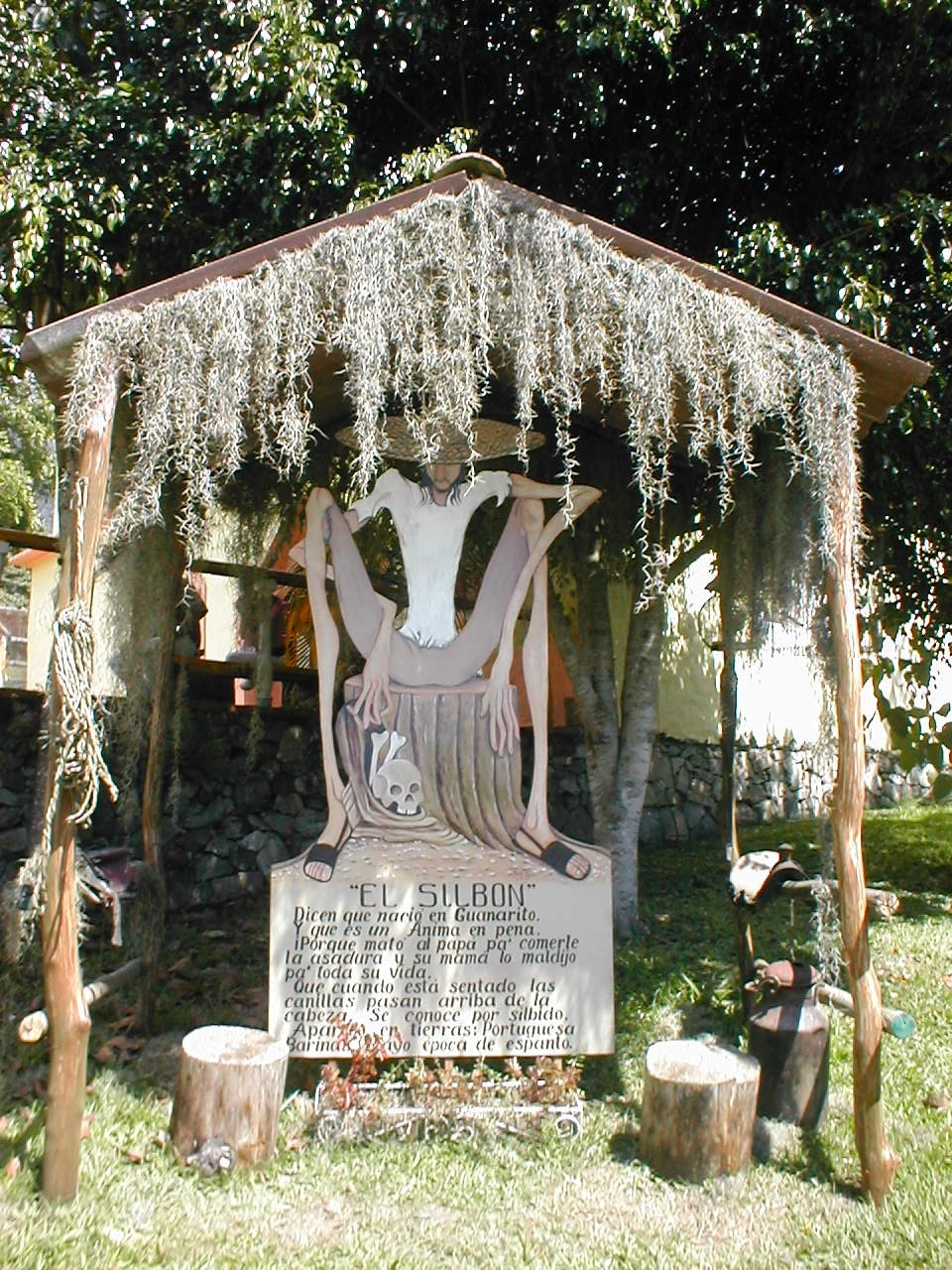
Effigy of The Silbón in the theme park la Venezuela de Antier.

El Silbón (The Whistler) is a legendary figure in Venezuela, associated especially with the Venezuelan Los Llanos region, particularly Portuguesa state, Guanarito Municipality, and also widespread in the Eastern Llanos of Colombia. It is usually described as a lost soul.

The legend, which emerged in the mid-19th century, forms part of Venezuelan llanero folklore and is also shared in Colombian–Venezuelan regions, functioning as a moral warning and an element of social control in rural areas.

== Legend ==
A disturbing version of the story states that this son was a "spoiled brat" whose parents catered to his every wish from childhood. He spent his time frequenting cantinas and wasting his life with alcohol. He was nicknamed El Silbón because of his habit of whistling. One night, angered by what had been served to him, he demanded that his mother prepare asaduras (offal) of white-tailed deer for dinner. After storming out of the house and going to a cantina to calm his anger, his mother asked his father to go into the forest to hunt a deer for their son; however, he failed to catch anything. After drinking, the son returned home and encountered his father, who tried to explain his failure. In a drunken rage and without listening, the son brutally beat him; when the father fell to the ground, the son repeatedly shot him with a hunting rifle until killing him. He then used his father's hunting knife to cut out his entrails without remorse, wrapped them in his shirt, and took them home to his mother, whom he had cook them for dinner.

The mother, finding the meat tough, began to suspect something was wrong. After questioning him, she realized that she was cooking her husband's entrails, panicked, and cried out for help. As punishment, the boy's grandfather ordered him to be tied to a post in the countryside and whipped violently until his back was destroyed. His wounds were then treated with substances described in different versions as strong liquor, chili peppers, lemon juice, or Aloe vera, and a sack containing his father's remains was placed on his wounded back. After being released, he was set upon by two rabid, starving dogs—identified in some versions as the Perros Tureco or the Dogs of the Devil—which, according to the legend, will pursue him until the end of time. Before releasing him, his grandfather cursed him, condemning him to carry his father's bones for all eternity and to wander forever.

You are cursed, and cursed you shall be for the rest of eternity until God has mercy on your soul.

It has a characteristic whistle. It is said that when the whistling sounds close, there's no danger, and the whistler is far away, but when the whistling sounds distant, it means it is nearby. It is also said that hearing the whistling foretells one's own death, and one may hear it anywhere at any time. In this situation, the only thing that can save the victim is the sound of a dog barking (as it is the only thing it is afraid of), a chili, or a whip. The spirit tends to take revenge on womanizers.

Many inhabitants of Los Llanos say that they have seen it, primarily in the summer, a time when the Venezuelan savannah burns in the harsh drought. The Whistler sits in the trees and gathers dust in his hands. But it is mainly on rainy or humid days that the spirit wanders, hungry for death, and eager to punish drunkards, womanizers, or sometimes innocent victims. It is said that it sucks the alcohol out of drunkards through their navel when it finds them alone and that it tears womanizers to pieces, removes their bones, and puts them in the sack where it keeps the remains of his father.

Some versions say it appears as a giant of about six meters that moves about the treetops, creaking, and emitting its chilling whistle. Inside its old and tattered sack lie the bones of its father, or according to some renditions, its multiple victims. Other versions say he appears as the shadow of a tall thin man, with a hat, and goes after drunkards most of all.

== See also ==
- Boogeyman
- Sack man
- Coco (folklore)
- Vengeful ghost
- Onryō
- La Llorona
- Madam Koi Koi
- Sayona
- Cadejo
- Slender Man
