= Chasca (Salvadoran folklore) =

Fictional character

Chasca, also known as "la virgen del agua" (The virgin of the water), is the name of a fictional character in Salvadoran folklore.

According to oral tradition, in the barra de Santiago lived a man named Pachacutec, who arranged a marriage between his daughter, Chasca, and a prince of the zutuhil tribe.

Chasca, however, was already in love with a young fisher named Acayatl. She would sneak away from her father to the beach where Acayatl would serenade her.

One horrible day, someone shot an arrow at Acayatl while he returned from fishing. The assassin was sent by Pachacutec. Chasca saw the murder and screamed with horror, and decided to join her lover in death. She tied a rock around her waist and threw herself into the water.

The following night of a full moon, the spirit of Chasca appeared for the first time in a white canoe next to Acayatl, from this time, she has continued to appear in this way. Whenever the fishermen notice a full moon, they do not go out to fish because they wish to respect and not disturb the virgin of the water and her lover, who in return for that respect, bless the fishermen with bountiful fish.

== See also ==
- La Huenchur
- Salvadoran folklore

== Bibliography ==
Miguel Ángel Espino (1967). Mitología de Cuscatlán. San Salvador: Dirección General de Publicaciones
