= Sayona =

Legendary figure from Venezuela

La Sayona is a legend from Venezuela, represented by the vengeful spirit of a woman that shows up only to men that have love affairs out of their marriages. The name "Sayona" refers to the cloth the ghost wears which is a long white dress similar to a medieval undergarment.

The legend claims that when this woman appears she asks for a ride, and after a while when the victim tries to see her face, he notices that she has instead a skull with horrible teeth.

== Legend ==
The legend says that "La Sayona" was a young woman named Casilda. She lived in a small town in the plains of Venezuela and was the most beautiful girl there. She was married to a great man, caring and loving. Casilda and her husband had a baby boy. One day, Casilda was swimming naked in a nearby river and a villager saw her. After that, the man would always follow her and watch her bathe in the river. One day Casilda saw him and told him to leave her alone; he ignored her, and instead told her that he was there to warn her: "Your husband is having an affair with none other than your mother," he said. Casilda ran home and found her husband asleep with the baby in his arms. Blind with anger, she burned the house with them inside. Villagers could hear their screams while Casilda ran to her mother's house. She found her on the patio and attacked her with a machete, striking her in the stomach. As the mother bled to death, she cursed Casilda telling her that from then on she would have to avenge all women by killing their unfaithful husbands. And from that day forward Casilda became "La Sayona".

In other versions of the tale, Sayona appears to men working in the jungle. She manifests when her unsuspecting victims talk to their workmates about sex or think of women they left behind in their hometown. Sayona appear to such men, assuming the likeness of beautiful woman, or a loved one, and lures them into the forest so she could reveal her animal-like features and devour them, or mangle them, leaving their wretched bodies for their companions to find.

== See also ==
- Chullachaqui
- Hulder
- La Llorona
- Miss Koi Koi
- Patasola
- Sihuanaba
- Siren
- Succubus
- The Silbón
- Tunda
- Xana
