= Cipitío =

Salvadoran folkloric character

El Cipitío is a central figure in Salvadoran folklore, closely tied to the legends of la Siguanaba and el Cadejo. He is typically depicted as a ten year-old boy with a prominent belly and wearing an oversized conical hat. His name derives from the Nahuatl term for child: cipit or cipote, though some traditional accounts link its origins to the deity Xipe Totec.

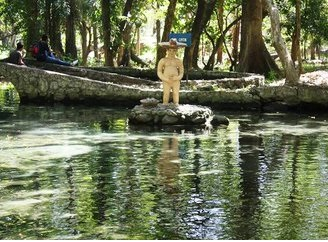
Statue of El Cipitío, meaning "the boy".

== Origin ==
Rooted in Pre-Columbian mythology, the legend of el Cipitío outlines his divine lineage and details the divine retribution that condemned both him and his mother, Sihuehet. In various folk traditions, he is depicted as a young boy wearing distinctive attire, including simple woven clothing and an oversized palm hat. The narrative also endows him with supernatural abilities, which he uses for harmless pranks and amusement rather than malice.

In El Salvador, the legend has historically served a formative function for children by reinforcing indigenous cultural traditions and conveying moral lessons regarding familial duty and social behavior.

El Cipitío is an iconic figure in Salvadoran culture, deeply rooted in indigenous oral traditions. The character has been adapted by numerous authors and screenwriters across various media, notably inspiring a Salvadoran television series that utilizes the legend to explore contemporary cultural and social issues.

== History ==
In Mesoamerican mythology, one variant of the legend attributes his lineage to the union between the moon goddess, Sihuet (also recorded as Sihuehet), and the deity of the morning star, Lucifer. The narrative incorporates a grievance committed against the Sun deity, prompting the intervention of the rain god, Tláloc. As divine retribution, Tláloc imposed dual penalties: Sihuet was stripped of her divinity and demoted to a wandering spirit, while the child was cursed with perpetual childhood.

Another variant of the narrative states that his mother seduced the Nahua prince Yeisun, a son of Tláloc, resulting in the birth of a child named Cipit (rendered Tzipit in modern Nawat orthography). In this account, the mother chronically neglected the child during the prince's absence. Upon discovering her severe negligence, Tláloc cursed the mother and condemned the Cipit to remain a ten year old boy until the end of time. Alternative regional versions further suggest that Cipit ultimately died as a direct consequence of his mother's abandonment.

Historically, certain interpretations have framed him as a deity associated with forbidden and adulterous unions, with some linguistic and mythological traditions linking his name to the god Xipe Tótec. In contemporary Salvadoran culture, he endures as a prominent figure, typically depicted as a nomadic perpetual child who roams the countryside.

El Cipitío is a legendary figure central to Salvadoran, Guatemalan and Mexican folklore. Preserved primarily through oral tradition across generations, the tale features regional variations while maintaining a core narrative framework. Etymologically, the name derives either from the Nawat word tzi'pit meaning "child", which also gives rise to the colloquial Salvadoran term cipote for young children, or from the Nahautl tzipitl, denoting a weak or undeveloped child.

== Appearance ==
Although divine by lineage, El Cipitío is visually characterized as an impoverished youth. Always dressed in traditional attire, he wears white cotton garments, leather sandals and a distinctively oversized, wide-brimmed, pointed hat; In regional variants across Mexico, the hat is omitted. The entity possesses supernatural abilities, notably teleportation.

Similar to the Amazonian Boraro, El Cipitío exhibits backwards-facing feet that obscure his direction of travel. When farmers attempt to track his footprints, they are inevitably led astray; following the orientation of the prints causes them to pursue the path in the wrong direction.

== Character ==
El Cipitío commonly frequents processing mills or any source of fire, where he bathes in and consumes the ashes, a dietary staple along a specific kind of bananas. He haunts riverbanks and likes to court young women, attempting to attract their attention through whistling or by throwing pebbles and flowers. Although traditional Salvadoran (Cuscatecla) lore geographically anchors his primary origin to the department of San Vicente, his legendary capacity for instantaneous relocation allows him to roam far beyond regional boundaries.

While not inherently malicious, El Cipitío is characterized by his mischievous nature and penchant for harassment, often mocking people with boisterous laughter. According to Salvadoran oral tradition, he displays a strong aversion to unhygienic practices. To ward off the entity, potential victims must perform a repulsive act of poor hygiene in its presence.

== Mexican variant ==
In the Mexican state of Chiapas, particularly across the coastal and Soconusco regions, the local variant of the legend centers on the Zipes (alternatively spelled Cipes). These entities are characterized as zoomorphic or animalistic spirits taking the form of young children. Physically, they exhibit reversed feet, oversized bellies and slender limbs.

These mute beings communicate solely through babbling the sound "zipe", from which their name derives. They travel in packs and sustain themselves in ashes, earning them the regional moniker Cenicientos ("Ashen Ones"). Elusive and difficult to capture, they offer fierce resistance when cornered, issuing desperate, high pitched shrieks of fear. According to local accounts, zipes can be domesticated through prolonged effort and patience, becoming useful domestic helpers.

In remote villages and rural settlements, the zipe has been held responsible for the disappearance of unbaptized infants, who are allegedly taken into the mountains to be made into servants.

The entities also target nocturnal travelers on isolated roads, leaping onto their mounts to torment them with pranks and taunts before vanishing into the night. Additionally, it is said that the zipe has a penchant for stalking women while they bathe in rivers, attempting to seduce or harass them.

== Guatemalan variant ==
In Guatemala, the figure is known as the Sombrerón or Tzitzimite. The Tzitzimite is traditionally described as a diminutive man dressed entirely in black, distinguished by a large, polished belt and a small black hat. He is also said to wear heeled boots that produce a characteristic sound as he moves.

The Tzitzimite is said to amuse himself by mounting horses and tying knots in their manes and tails, which prove exceptionally difficult to unravel. He is likewise notorious for pursuing and harassing young women. When the spirit takes an interest in a woman, he is said to relentlessly torment her, reportedly visiting her at night and tangling her hair while she sleeps. He may also appear during mealtimes and scatter dirt over her food, preventing the harassed woman from eating, causing her to gradually lose weight.

== In popular media ==
From 1990 to 1992, El Salvador's Educational Cultural Television (Channel 10) produced the live-action children's series Las Aventuras del Cipitío (The Adventures of Cipitío) starring Salvadoran actor José Rolando Menéndez Castro in the titular role alongside a locally cast ensemble.

In 2005, the Ministry of Education expanded the franchise by launching a follow-up series, Las Nuevas Aventuras del Cipitío (The New Adventures of Cipitío), also broadcast on Channel 10. The updated narrative introduced an expanded roster of characters and villains, played by notable Salvadoran performers.

El Cipitío has been prominently featured across Salvadoran literature. Miguel Ángel Espino incorporated the figure into his seminal work Mitología de Cuscatlán, while Salarrué included the legend in his story "El Cipe" (published in Trasmallo). In 2006, writer Manlio Argueta released a child-friendly adaptation titled El Cipitío; this version softens the spirit's goblin-like traits to convey the core elements of the legend to a younger audience.

== See also ==
- Curupira
- Caipora

== Bibliography ==
- Cordova, Carlos (2005). The Salvadoran American. Westport: Greenwood Press.
- Kampwirth, Karen and Victoria Gonzalez (2001). Radical Women in Latin America: Left and Right. State College: Penn State University Press.
- Kephart, Beth (2003). Still Love in Strange Places. New York: Norton.
