= Colombian folklore =

Beliefs, customs, and cultural traditions of Columbia

Carnaval de Barranquilla Marimonda characters.

Colombian folklore are beliefs, customs and cultural traditions in Colombia.

== Cultural influences ==
Colombia has traditional folk tales and stories about legendary creatures, which are transmitted orally and passed on to new generations. Some of them are common with other Latin American countries. The Colombian folklore has strong influences from Spanish culture, with elements of African and Native American cultures.

== Relevancy ==
These folkloric entities are present in carnivals and festivals countrywide. The “Desfiles de Mitos y Leyendas” (parades of myths and legends) are an important part of these events in most of the Colombian cities and municipalities. Examples of these parades are the Barranquilla Carnival, Cali Fair and Festival of the Flowers, where the legendary creatures parade takes place in Medellín's Pueblito Paisa, at the top of Nutibara hill. Legendary creatures have also been accepted into many facets of popular culture and the collective memory. There are those who believe in their existence, claiming to have heard or even encountered them.

== Legendary figures ==
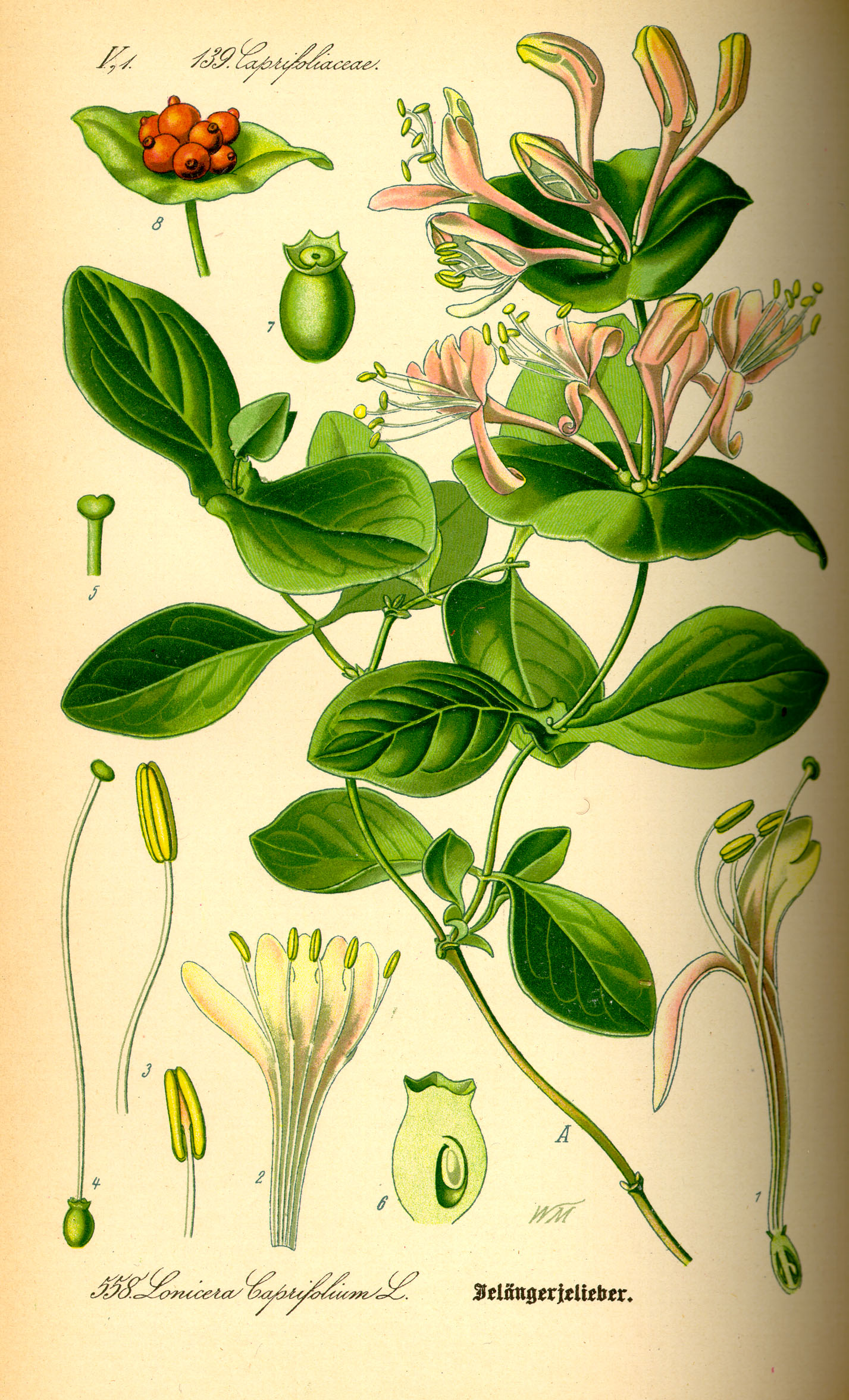
Lonicera plant is associated to the spirit of Madremonte

- The Tunda (La Tunda) is a myth of the Pacific Region of Colombia, and particularly popular in the Afro-Colombian community, about a vampire-like doppelganger monster woman.
- The Patasola or "one foot" is one of many myths in Latin American folklore about woman monsters from the jungle.
- The Boraro (The Pale Ones), is a more monstrous version of The Curupira from Brazilian Folklore in the mythology of the Tucano people. Much like the "Curupira" it has backwards facing feet to confuse it's foes and is a protector of wildlife. Beyond its feet however, it is far more grotesque in appearance. It is very tall to the extent it is tree sized, pale skinned but covered in black fur, has large forward facing ears, fangs and huge pendulous genitals. It has no joints in its knees, so if it falls down it has great trouble getting up. It uses two main ways to kills its victims, first its urine is a lethal poison . Secondly, if it catches a victim in its embrace it will crush them without breaking skin or bones, until their flesh is pulp. Then it drinks the pulp through a small hole made in the victims head, after which the victims empty skin is inflated like a balloon and are then sent home in a daze, where they subsequently die. It can be placated by tobacco, but to escape it one can either place their hands in its footprints which will cause its legs to stiffen and temporarily make the monster fall, or alternatively run backwards while facing it, which confuses the monster.
- The Moan is a forest and river creature that protects the forests, steals women and disturbs fishing and hunting activities.
- The Llorona or the Weeping Woman is the ghost of a woman crying for her dead children that she drowned. Her appearances are sometimes held to presage death.
- The Madremonte (Mother Mountain/Mother of the forest) or Marimonda is usually regarded as protective of nature and the forest animals and unforgiving when humans enter their domains to alter or destroy them. She can be identified with Mother Nature and Mistress of the Animals. She is described as a beautiful, tall woman, who has hair made of plants and glowing eyes.
- The Hombre Caiman, or Alligatorman, is a legendary creature that possesses both alligator and human features. This South American folk tale is particularly popular in Plato, Magdalena, especially in rural and less populated areas. He is said to have been a fisherman converted by the spirit of the Magdalena River into an alligator, that returns every year on St. Sebastian´s day to hunt human victims, much like the werewolf.

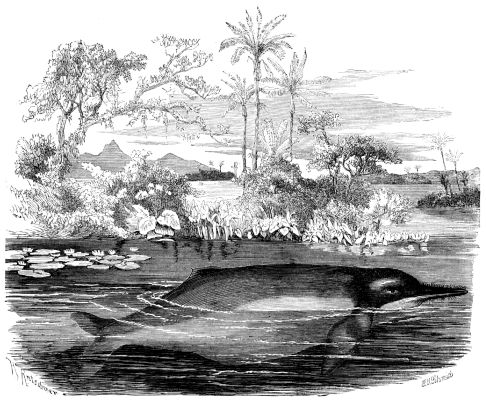
1883 drawing of Boto. The pink dolphin is feared by the indigenous people as a mischievous spirit of water

- The Mohana (La Mojana) Mother of water or Mami Wata is a shapeshifting water spirit who usually appear in human form to seduce and take away the humans. In the Amazon basin this features are applied to the Pink dolphins representing the spirit of Amazon River. The discography of Colombian folkloric singer Totó la Momposina includes works about the Mohana.
- The evil chicken ("pollo maligno") is an evil spirit of the forest in the form of a bird that haunts the hunters, attracting them to the deepest forest in order to devour them.
- The Candileja is said to be the spirit of a vicious old woman, who was in charge of her grandchildren but neglected to teach them any moral principles, so they grew up as murderers and thieves. In the afterlife she was damned to travel around the world surrounded by flames. It is related to the Will-o'-the-wisp phenomenon.
- The dark mule or Mula Retinta is an evil spirit that appears before arrieros as a pack animal, causing violent winds and storms that make people fall off the precipices at the side of the pathways.
- The Bracamonte is a creature who is unseen, yet its bellows are said to make cattle hide in fear. It is said that the only way to protect oneself from a Bracamonte is to nail a stake with a cow skull, as the Bracamonte was said to fear the bones of the cows it would eat.
- The Viruñas or Mandingas (the Evil One), is considered a representation of Satan, and appears as a handsome man who steals the souls of the people.

== See also ==
- List of Reportedly Haunted Locations in Colombia
