= Tunda =

Spirit in myths of Colombia and Ecuador

The Tunda (Spanish: La Tunda) is a myth from the Pacific coastal region of Colombia and Ecuador, and particularly in the Afro-Colombian community of the Chocó department, about a shapeshifting entity resembling a human woman that lures people into the forests and traps them never to be seen again.

The Tunda is described as being capable of changing its shape to appear in the form of a loved one, such as in the likeness of a child's mother, to lure its victims into the forest and feed them with shrimp (camarones peneídos) to keep them docile. This deception is referred to as entundamiento and a person in this state of pacified stupor is called entundado(a).

Her shapeshifting abilities are said to be imperfect, as this doppelgänger of sorts would always have a wooden leg in the shape of a molinillo, a wooden kitchen utensil used to stir hot drinks such as chocolate or aguapanela. The monster, however, is very cunning when trying to hide this defect from its would-be victims. In other versions, it appears to male loggers or hunters working deep into the jungle as a beautiful woman that tries to lure a man away, so it can reveal its hideous nature and suck his blood and drink it or devour him as a wild animal like bears.

== See also ==
- Sayona
- Patasola
- Deer Woman
- Sihuanaba
- Baobhan sith
- Leanan sídhe
- Huldra
- Soucouyant
