= Mythology in France =

The mythologies in present-day France encompass the mythology of the Gauls, Franks, Normans, Bretons, and other peoples living in France, those ancient stories about divine or heroic beings that these particular cultures believed to be true and that often use supernatural events or characters to explain the nature of the universe and humanity. French myth has been primarily influenced by the myths and legends of the Gauls (or Celts) and the Bretons as they migrated to the French region from modern day England and Ireland. Other smaller influences on the development of French mythology came from the Franks.

== History of myth in France ==
Until March 1790, France was divided into 34 provinces which existed independently of each other. All provinces operated under the regime of the King, but there was no national citizenship or holistic nation state. Most provinces were settled by several different racial groups. As such, most provinces developed their own unique mythological beliefs and customs. These historic geographic divisions have led to a great diversity of myths and legends which survive across contemporary France. Gallia, etymologically distinct from Gaul though in common parlance used interchangeably, was the name given to contemporary France by the Romans, and comprised land from the Mediterranean coast of France to the Pyrenees. Gaul was inhabited by several ethnic groups, mostly descendant from Celtic peoples, known as the Gallic tribes. These Gallic tribes developed distinct forms of Gallo-Roman culture after the Roman sacking of Gaul in the second century. The first settlers inhabited modern day Brittany, and the mythology of the northernmost Gallic tribes, including werewolves and other mischwesen, survive in lais from Medieval manuscripts. Between the 3rd and 7th century, Germanic migrants began to settle in Roman-Gaul. As the Western-Roman empire began to collapse, the German migrants who would become known as the Franks began to exercise their influence over the west of France. The Franks shared many of the customs and superstitions with other Germanic peoples, and spread many of their nature rituals and beliefs across western France.

== Gallo-Roman myth ==
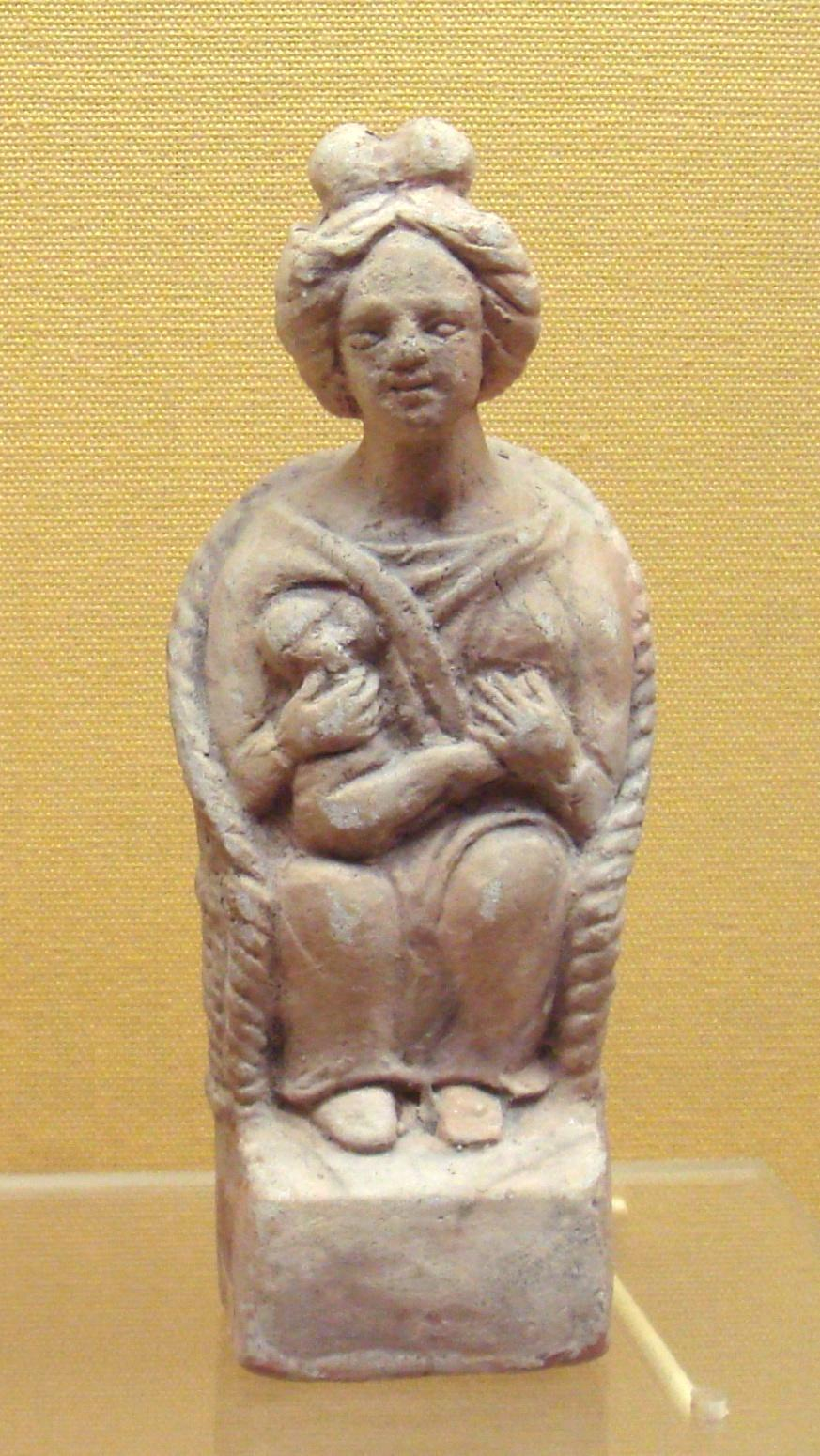
Matrona Gaul goddess alt

After the sacking of Gaul by the Romans in the 2nd century, the spiritual and mythological practices of the Gauls in the French region began to change due to Roman influence. Traditional Celtic Paganism draws on the deities of the Celtic pantheon, an extensive grouping of gods and goddesses traditionally worshiped in Celtic lands, and acknowledges the supernatural within the natural environment. As the Roman Empire began to expand, many Celtic beliefs and practices merged with the beliefs of the Romans. By the 3rd century, the Gauls worshiped many Roman deities like Mercury and Mars, and some uniquely Gallo-Roman Gods, like Teutates and Dea Matrona. Many of the Roman deities may have been worshiped under different names, though most records of Gallic religions were written by Romans like Julius Caesar and hence these names are unknown.

Individual households and tribes had their own gods and goddesses, who served as a bridge between people and nature. The Gallo-Romans believed that some natural features had their own deities. Some of these deities, are still revered under Christianised names, like the nymph of the Breton shore, who is still venerated under the name of Saint Anne. Many of these local deities were drawn from the old Celtic pantheon, and influenced by the Roman deities.

The Gauls worshiped the main gods of the Roman pantheon, observing rituals related to Mercury, Apollo, Mars, Jupiter, and Minerva. Gallo-Romans regarded Mercury as the creator of the Arts, and the God ruling over trade, commerce, and communication. Apollo was believed to protect the Gauls from disease, Minerva was the goddess of wisdom and practical life arts, Jupiter was able to control the sun, moon, and weather, and Mars was the god of war. The Gauls often made sacrifices to Mars during wartime, offering up cattle from conquered territories in exchange for protection in battle.

=== Druidism ===
The influence of Celtic mythology did not disappear after the Roman invasion, with the rituals and practices of Druidism still exerting influence over the mythology of the Gauls. Druids in Roman-Gaul were the philosophers and religious figures of the Gallic tribes. Druids were the educated classes among Celtic and Gallo-Roman culture, having knowledge about nature, astronomy, literature, and the law. Druids were unable to record any of their knowledge in written form, but records from Julius Caesar survive, giving details of Druidic rituals. Caesar writes that Druids were responsible for conducting both human and animal sacrifices for those who were sick or at risk of dying in battle. Druids constructed wicker statues and images in which the sacrifices are placed before they are burned. In traditional Celtic Paganism, these sacrifices were made to the Celtic gods and goddesses. Roman-Gallo Druids probably made sacrifices to honour the gods of the Roman pantheon by drawing on the Celtic practice of sacrifice. Pliny the Elder, a Roman-Gallic author who wrote extensively about Gallo-Roman culture, observed that Druids acted as judges in criminal cases and provided spiritual guidance to their people by interpreting omens.

== Myths of Brittany ==
=== Prehistoric myth ===
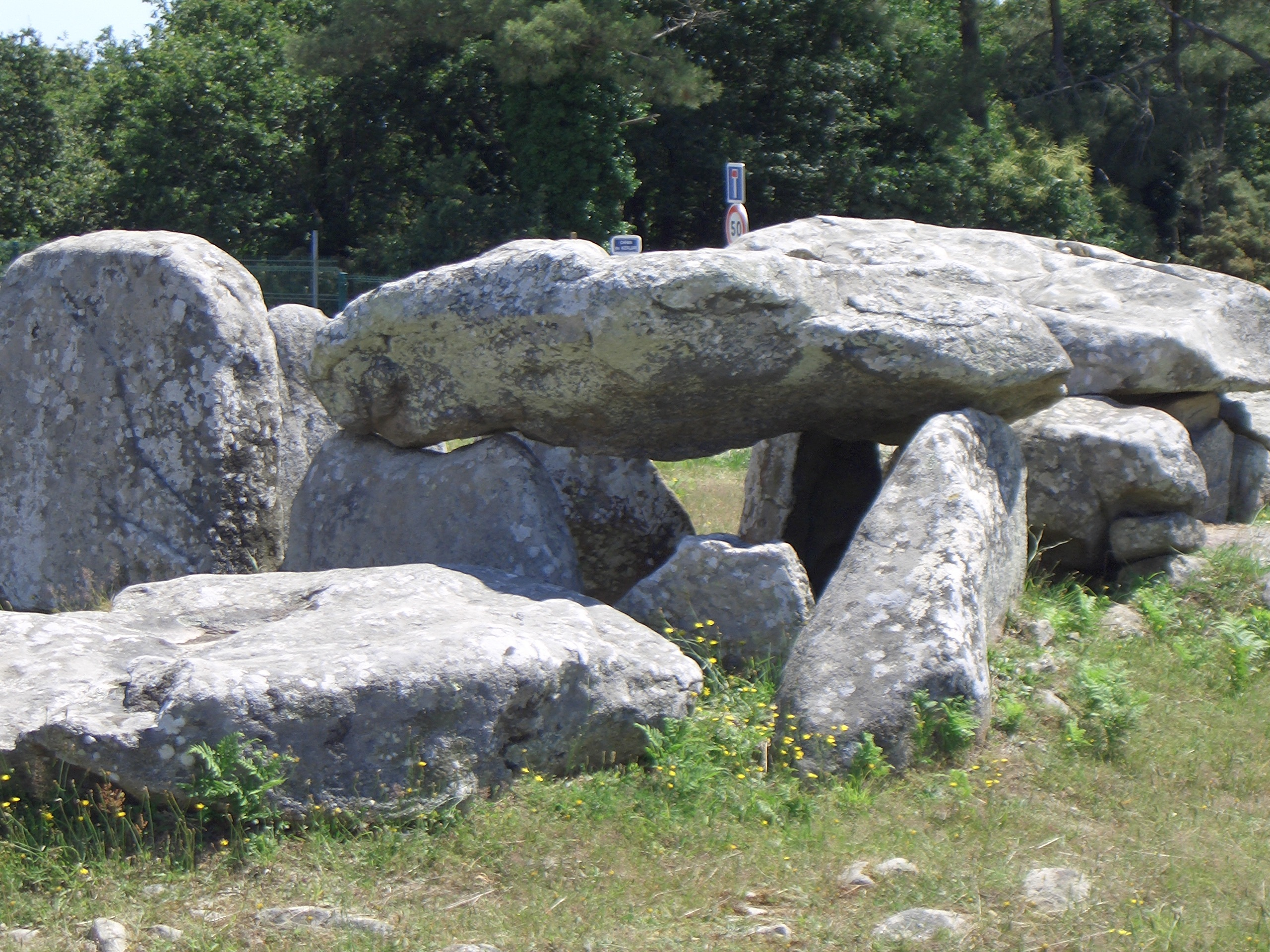
The Carnac Stones in Brittany

The Carnac stones are a cluster of megaliths in the north western village of Carnac in Brittany. The megaliths were probably built by either Celtic or pre-Celtic peoples, between the Bronze and Iron Ages. There are more than 3,000 types of megaliths in the cluster including the dolmen, a large rock, supported by smaller stones; and the menhir, a monolith set up on the end of a single stone which is buried in the ground. The folkloric significance of these stones is unclear though they probably functioned as outdoor altars or open-air temples for rituals involved in the practicing of Celtic Paganism. Dolmens and menhirs may also mark the tombs of significant leaders in tribal groups, like chiefs, priests, or celebrated warriors.

=== Middle Ages and Paganism ===
The Middle Ages was a period of transition between the various Pagan traditions influenced by the Celts and the Romans, and the influx of Christianity from Britain. Much of Brittany's folklore, including the Gallo-Roman deities and mythical figures, were preserved in lais; short style of poetry popular in the High Middle Ages which discuss values of chivalry, the role of the mythical in the lives of regular people, and they deal primarily with matters of love. The lais of Marie de France were some of the most influential and provided insight into many of Brittany's folkloric beliefs in the Middle Ages.

Prominent figures of Celtic Paganism feature heavily in Breton lais. Many sprites, fairies, and demons populate the belief system of the Celts and were important figures in the communication of moral lessons and the explanation of unknown phenomena in Brittany. Such figures who were important to the Bretons included

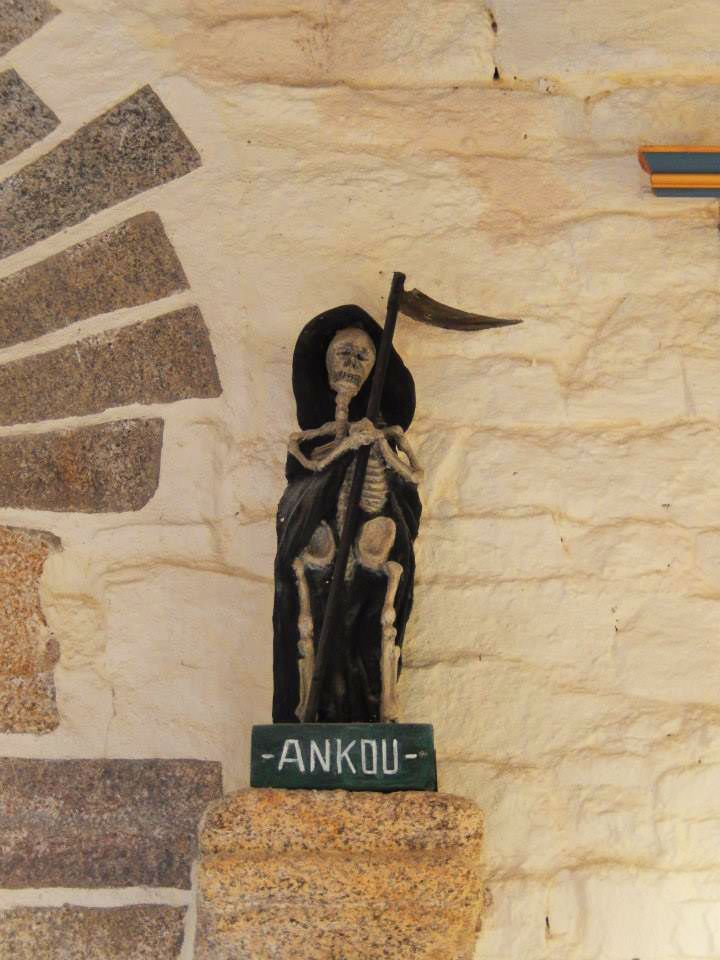
A statue of Ankou, in the chapel of St Fiacre at Cabellou in Concarneau.

- The Ankou: A grim-reaper type figure who travels across Brittany in a cart and collects the souls of peasants. The Ankou is usually depicted as a female skeleton and the figure was probably derived from the Celtic god of Death, but was greatly influenced by Medieval ideas of ‘Death the Skeleton.’
- The Nain: A gargoyle like creature who dance around dolmen in the middle of the night. It was believed that those see the Nain will curse them with bad luck and will plant false memories in the minds of victims in order to lure them into danger.
- The Youdic: Victims of the vast bogs believed to be portals to infernal regions and Hell known as the Yeun.

Werewolves also feature heavily in the mythology of Brittany. Brittons believed werewolves to be men condemned to transform into wolves as punishment for sins. Superstition regarding werewolves may have stemmed from a fear of cannibalism among early residents of Brittany, but fears about the existence of werewolves continued into the 16th century. Werewolves appear in many Breton lais, including the lais of Marie de France, one of the most well-known authors of Old French lais in the 12th century. Werewolves appear in Marie de France's lai ‘Bisclavret’ which tells the story of a man who transforms into a werewolf, referred to as a bisclavret in the story, when he removes his clothing. Marie de France's work likely draws heavily from existing pre-existing mythology and can be used to understand how the public felt about certain figures.

=== Christianisation of Brittany ===
Brittany was Christianised during the latter part of the Gallo-Roman habitation of France. In the 5th and 6th centuries C.E. British people moved to Brittany to flee from Anglo-Saxon invaders. The British migrants spread Christianity throughout Brittany over the next 300 years, assisted by missionaries from the British Isles. Contemporary Britons give great respect to the ‘Seven Founding Saints’ who are credited with bringing Catholicism to Brittany. The ‘Seven Founding Saints’ are:

- St Paol Aoreliann
- St Tudwal
- St Brieg
- St Maloù
- St Samsun of Dol
- St Padarn
- St Kaourintin

Brittany's insular nature has led to the development of many distinctive traditions within Catholic religious practice, including "Pardons." Pardons are penitential ceremonies occurring in an individual parish on the feast day of their saint. The celebrations involve parishioners processing together to a church or shrine to ask for forgiveness for sins, and ends with a large meal celebrated by all the penitents.

== Frankish myths ==
=== Pre-Christian Paganism ===
Approximate location of the Frankish tribes in the 3rd century.

The Franks were a group of Germanic people who found their mythological and spiritual origins in pre-Christian Germanic Paganism. They invaded Gaul in the 4th and 5th centuries, and became the dominant force in the region of present-day France and Western Germany. In 358 CE, Rome was forced to relinquish some of the land they held in Gaul, allowing the Franks to expand their territory into Gaul. By 480 CE, the Franks held firmly to the western part of France.

Early Frank mythology found its roots in Germanic paganism, and the Franks would have probably worshiped gods from a German pantheon, but may have placed emphasis on the fertility gods. The German pantheon is likely to have had three central figures; Thor, the most powerful god who rules the air and sea, Wodan, god of war, and Fricco god of peace. The Frankish people probably worshiped the deities of the German pantheon through the construction of altars and practicing of nature-based rituals in forest glens or beside lakes. It is believed that the Franks took a deeply tribal approach to religious practice. Apart from the most central figures of the German pantheon, some gods borrowed from the Nordic pantheon, or the "Allfadir," a central, all-knowing deity, the many Frankish tribes worshiped separate gods. These tribalistic gods were not worshiped or feared outside their tribes. Cults of Wodan (sometimes referred to Ođinn), and Cults of Nerthus were common among the central Frankish tribes, while Cults of Yngvi were common among tribes along the North Sea.

=== Christianisation of the Franks ===
The process of converting the Pagan Franks to Chalcedonian Christianity began between the late 5th century and early 6th century. It began with the baptism of the wife of Clovis I, the first king to unite all of the Frankish tribes under one ruler. His wife, Clotilde, converted to Chalcedonian Christianity in approximately 500 CE and then convinced Clovis I to be baptised into Chalcedonian Christianity in 508 CE. During his reign, King Clovis I encouraged many Frankish tribes to begin practicing Christianity, weakening the hold that Roman legend had on the Franks. He influenced the mass adoption of Chalcedonian Christianity at the collapse of the Roman empire, which encouraged the unification of the Frankish tribes under the rule of Clovis. King Clovis I managed to mostly phase out the practicing of Germanic Paganism in the Frankish land during his reign.
