= Lakanica =

Lakanica is type of supernatural being from traditional Polish folklore who is a spirit of the fields or meadows. These are reputed to be shy and elusive creatures who can appear in human female form.

== Similarity to the rusalki ==
Scholar Alanna Muniz notes the range of such creatures in stories from western Slavic cultures that share a common non-hierarchical religion. A Lakanica was similar to other types ovily/rusalki, spirits who “are believed to reside in or near lakes, springs, rivers, and marshes, although they are also connected to fields, trees, and woods in some locations.”

== Depiction in fiction ==
A Lakanica and other mythological characters play a role in the 21st century novel The Dollmaker of Kraków, set before and during World War II.
