= La Bolefuego =

Apparition in South American folklore

La Bolefuego (or La Candileja) is a legendary character from Colombian and Venezuelan folklore. It is said to be a bright apparition, found in the dark nights of Los Llanos. It is described as a flashing lantern that turns and shakes violently.

== The legend ==
The Bolefuego is said to be the spirit of a woman that was burned alive in her home, along with her two children. She attacks travelers. Those facing her are advised not to pray; unlike other evil entities, the Bolefuego is attracted by prayers.

== See also ==
- Will-o'-the-wisp
- Hitodama

== Sources ==
- Ocampo López, Javier (2006). Mitos y leyendas latinoamericanas. Bogotá: Plaza y Janes Editores Colombia S.A. p. 182. ISBN 9581403698.
