= Hobbididance =

Supernatural creature in English folk mythology

A Hobbididance, or Hoberdidance, was a malevolent sprite mentioned in the traditional English morris dance and in William Shakespeare's theatrical play King Lear (c. 1606). It was borrowed from Samuel Harsnett's Declaration of Egregious Popish Impostures (1603). It helped scholars to set the earliest composition date for the play.

Poor Tom hath been scared out of his good wits: bless thee, good man’s son, from the foul fiend! Five fiends have been in poor Tom at once; of lust, as Obidicut; Hobbididance, prince of dumbness; Mahu, of stealing; Modo, of murder; and Flibbertigibbet, of mopping and mowing; who since possesses chambermaids and waiting-women. So, bless thee, master!

— King Lear, Act IV, Scene I
