= Hercinia =

Bird of Medieval legends

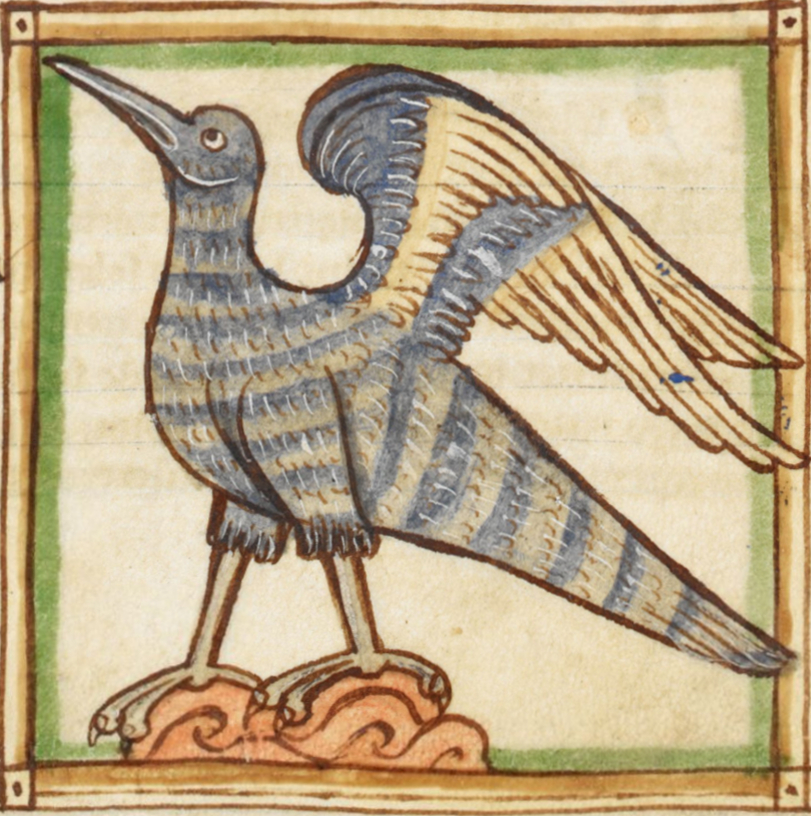
Illumination of 13th century manuscript

Hercinia is a legendary bird with glowing feathers that inhabited the Hercynian Forest of ancient Germany.

== Description ==
The hercinia is depicted in Medieval bestiaries and was recorded in the 1st century by Pliny the Elder, who wrote, "In the Hercynian Forest, in Germany, we hear of a singular kind of bird, the feathers of which shine at night like fire". Writing in the 7th century, Isidore of Seville notes, "Their feathers sparkle so much in the shade that, however dark the night is with thick shadows, these feathers, when placed on the ground, give off light that helps to mark the way, and the sign of the glittering feathers makes clear the direction of the path".

== Suggested origins ==
Whether or not the hercinia was a real species of luminescent bird cannot be said with any degree of certainty. It is possible that the reports of the hercinia were based on sightings of birds with iridescent feathers that reflected moonlight, a phenomenon that has been reported of a number of species of birds, including the barn owl and the bittern. It is also possible that tales of the hercinia were based upon birds that carried bioluminescent fungi or bacteria in their feathers.

== Legacy ==
The legend of the glowing birds of the Hercynian forest has inspired various works of art, including Thomas Moore's poem, "A Dream of Antiquity".

== See also ==
- Alicanto
