= Lui-kong-tsiau =

Taiwanese mythological creature

Lui-kong-tsiau (Chinese: 雷公鳥; Pe̍h-ōe-jī: Luî-kong-tsiáu; lit. 'thunderbird') is a legendary creature in Taiwanese folklore that can summon thunder and lightning.

== Legend ==
The Lui-kong-tsiau looks very similar to chicken. It mainly live in tall trees. Whenever it climb the treetops, dark clouds will begin to gather in the sky, and thunder will begin with its crow.

In Native American legends, there is also an eagle-like thunderbird that create storm winds and thunder.

== See also ==
- Lists of legendary creatures
- Yōkai
