= Chullachaki =

Mythical creature of the Amazonian jungle

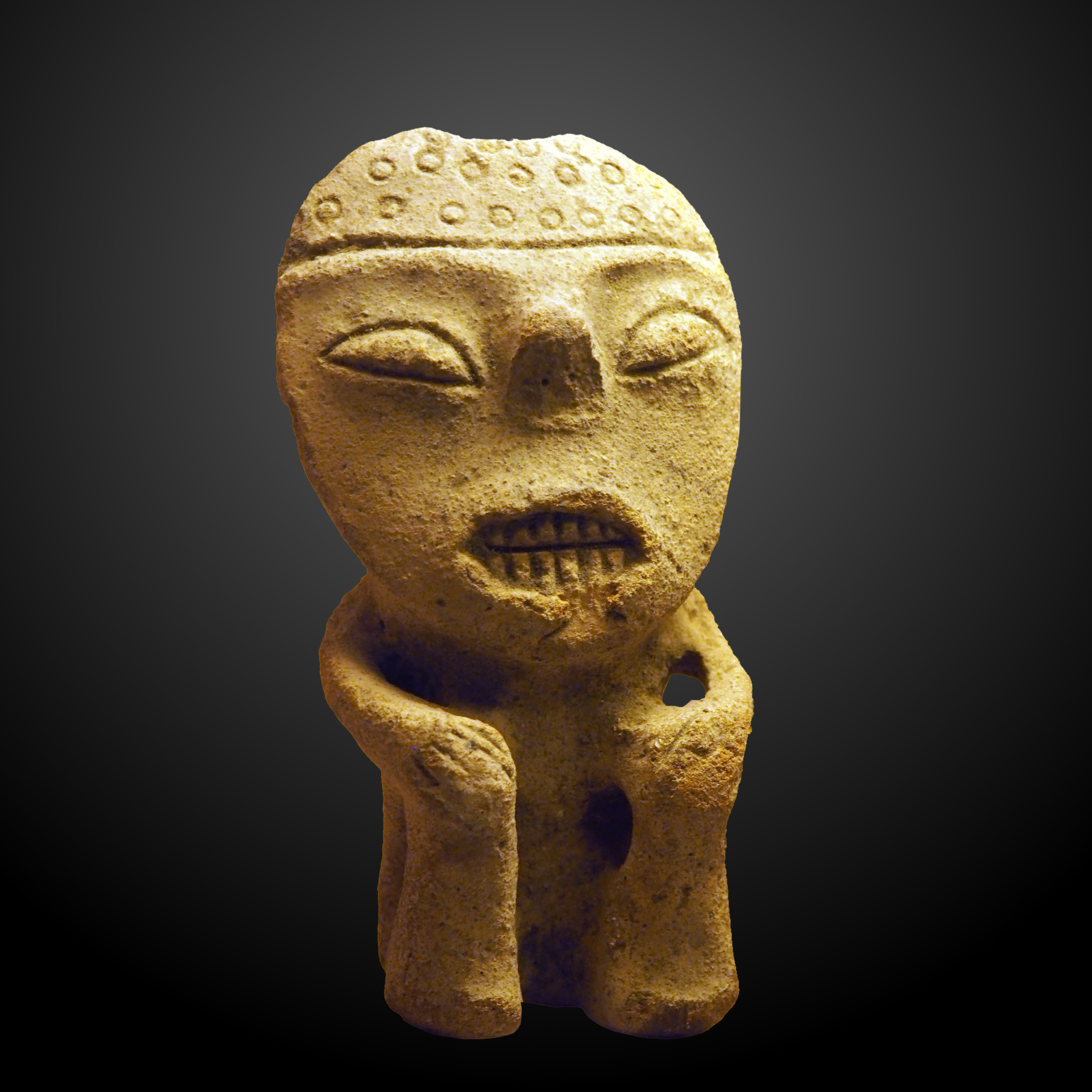
Clay statuette from Argentina, on display at the Bern Historical Museum

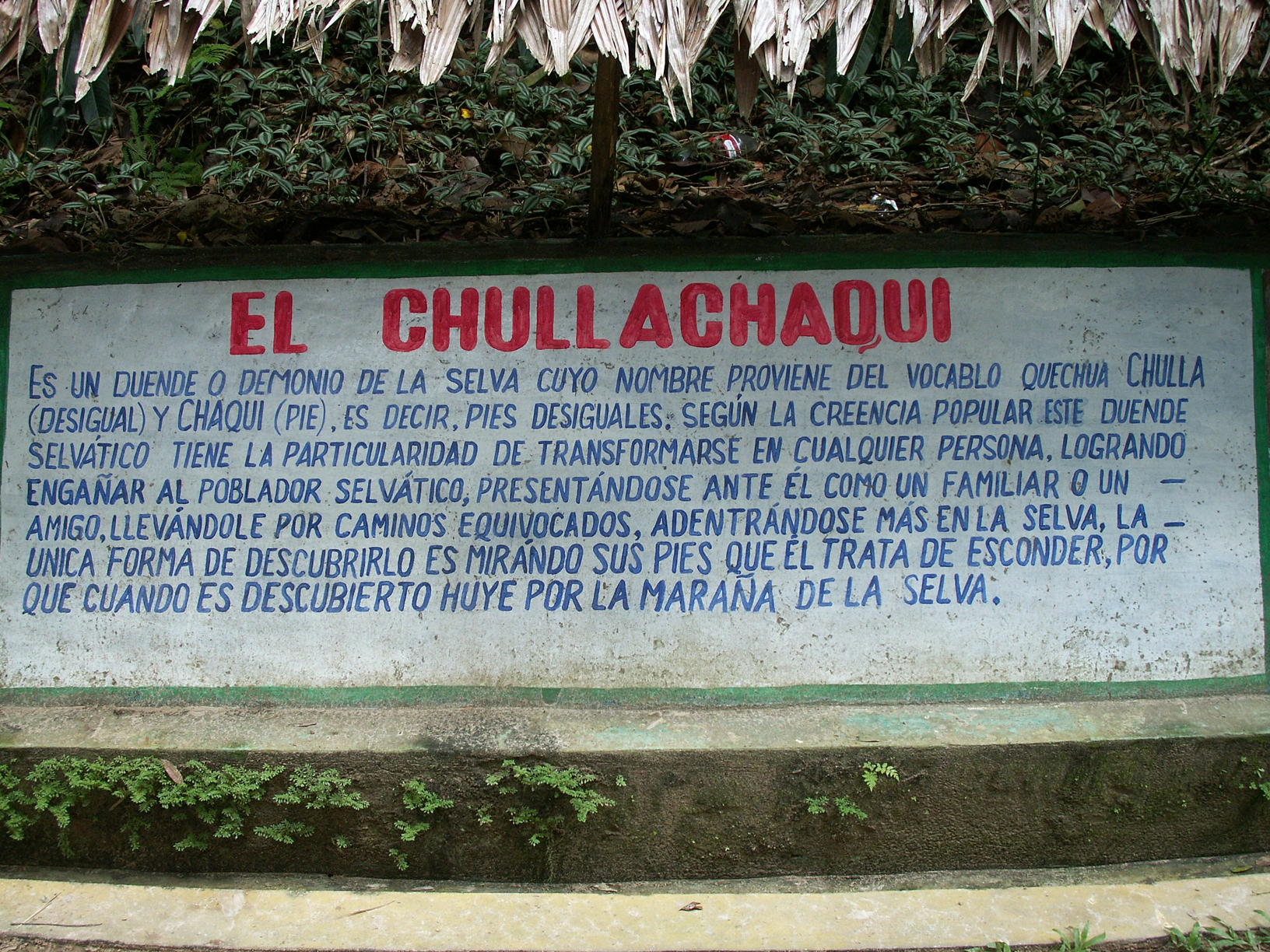
The legend of the Chullachaqui Mural (Iquitos - Peru)

The Chullachaki (Quechua, "one-footed", from chulla or ch'ulla = single, odd, unpaired, asymmetric, chaki = foot; spelling sometimes also used in Spanish) or Chullachaqui (Hispanicized spelling), also known as the Shapishico, is a mythical forest creature of the Peruvian and Brazilian Amazonian jungle.

== Description ==
He is generally described as short and ugly, with one leg shorter than the other and one foot either larger than the other, pointed backward or in the form of a hoof.

He is said to persuade his victims to follow him deep into the jungle where even experienced trackers cannot find their way back. He does this by taking the form of a family member or a loved one long not seen, or disguising himself as a prey animal. His uncanny ability to replicate others makes him impossible to tell apart, except for his mismatched feet.

Others say that he appears in the shape of a very short man dressed in rags, waving his closed fists in the air looking for a fight. In this case, the indigenous people believe a man must accept his challenge and beat him until he uncovers all the richness he has hidden in the jungle. He who declines this challenge is cursed with the inability to hunt and with foul luck: family and friends turn into enemies, wives leave with other men, etc.

Chullachaqui is said to have the ability to turn into any animal of the rainforest. He is a kind of forest spirit who guards the lands and the animals and punishes a man if he breaks a taboo or otherwise acts unwisely in the forest. According to a local legend, Chullachaqui is a member of an older species, one that lived there long before humans. Most of the time they remain quite uninterested in humans. They inhabit forest spots far from human habitation, where they supposedly have their own gardens and fields to tend. If a human being dwells too close to those gardens, they might attack and put a spell on the unlucky human. Sometimes a Chullachaqui might also steal a human child and raise it as its own, or lure humans into a trap for mating purposes. A human thus stolen by the Chullachaqui becomes one of them.

== See also ==
- Banjhakri and Banjhakrini
- Caipora
- Changeling
- Chupacabra
- Curupira
- Devil's garden
- Gremlin
- Patasola
- Saci (Brazilian folklore)
- Menehune
