= Sihuanaba =

Supernatural character from Central American folklore

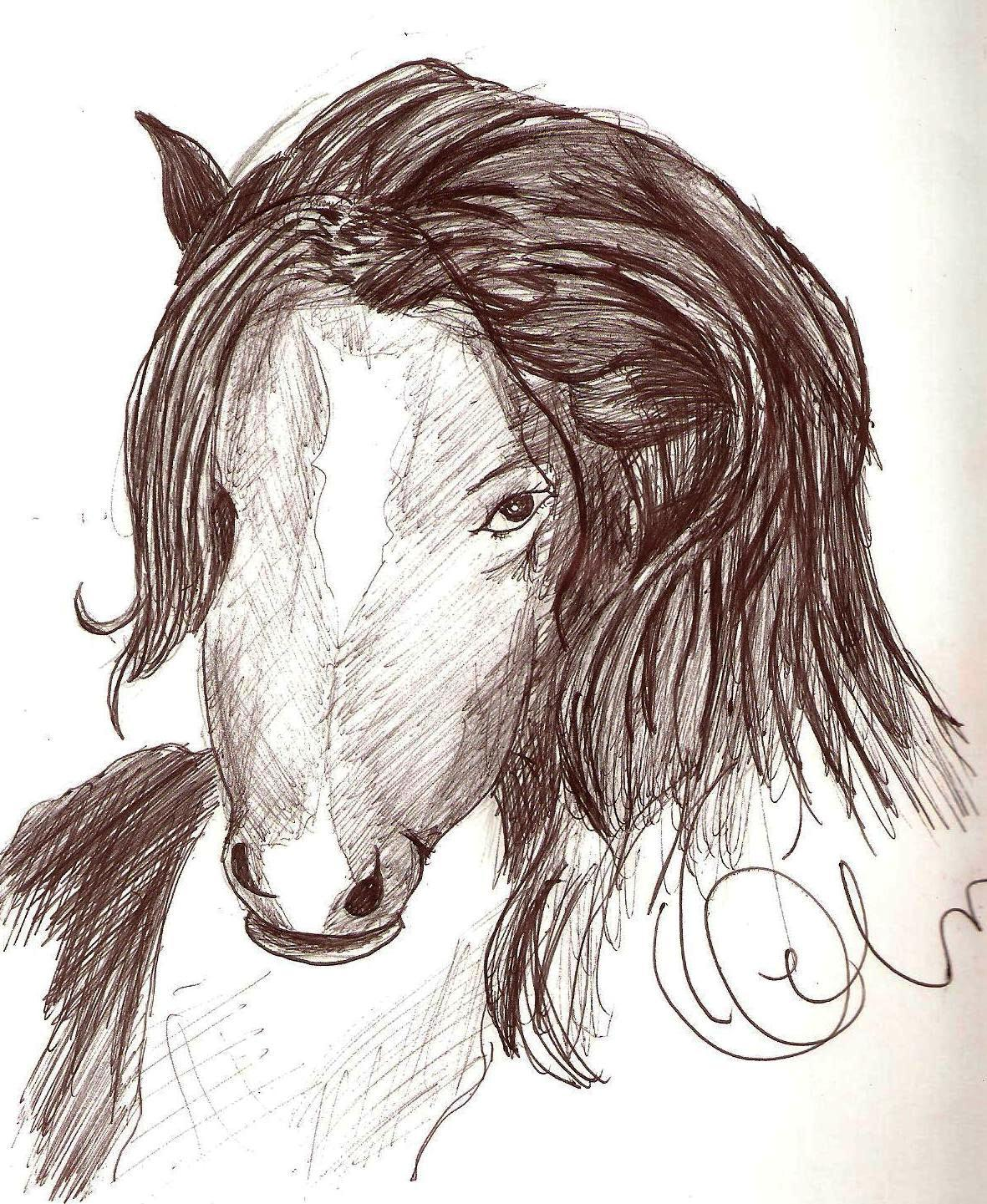
Depiction of Sihuanaba

The Sihuanaba is a supernatural entity originating in Central American folklore, with related regional variants present across parts of Mexico. In standard mythological depictions, the entity functions as a shapeshifting spirit that adopts the appearance of an attractive, long haired woman to deceive observers from a distance. Utilizing this guise, it entices solitary men into isolated or hazardous environments prior to revealing a grotesque true form, commonly represented as a fleshless skull or the head of a horse.

Scholars hypothesize that the Sihuanaba and its variants originated in Spain and were introduced to Latin America during the colonial period. Under this framework, Spanish colonists adapted the legend as an instrument of social control over Indigenous and mestizo populations.

== Appearance ==
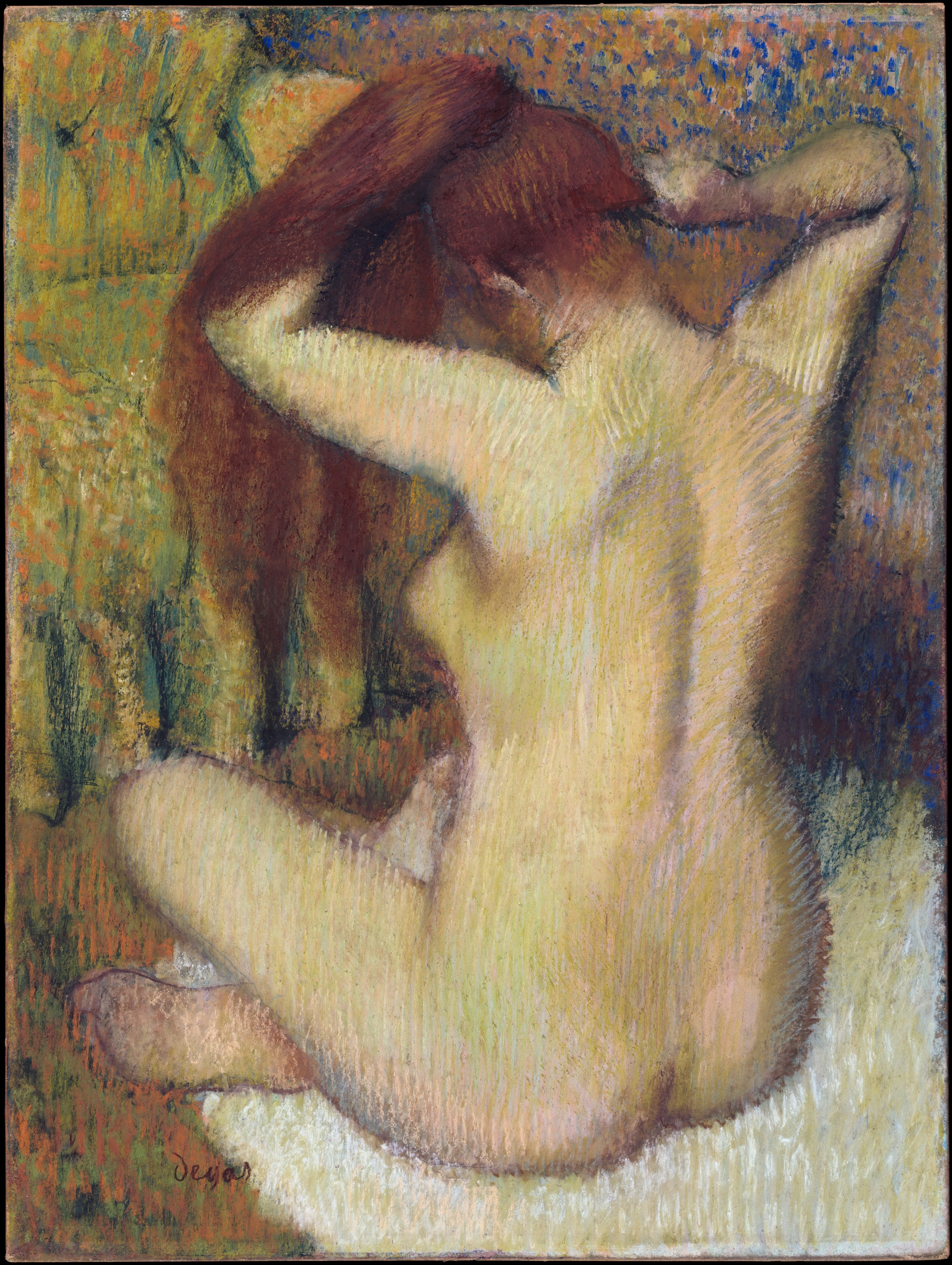
The Siguanaba is sometimes viewed as a naked woman combing her hair

In traditional folklore, the Sihuanaba is described as a woman of striking beauty, often depicted nude or wearing thin white or black garments. She is commonly encountered washing clothing or bathing in rivers, streams, and other bodies of water. The entity primarily targets solitary nocturnal travelers, keeping her face initially obscured to exploit her physical appeal. Through this deception, she draws victims away from established routes into remote or hazardous terrain, leaving them lost or disoriented.

In Guatemalan mythology, the Sihuanaba is typically depicted as an attractive, seductive woman with long hair who conceals her facial features. Upon revealing her face, it is shown to resemble that of a horse or human skull. This sudden revelation is said to induce severe shock, causing victims to either die of fright or descend into madness. In many accounts, the entity specifically targets unfaithful men by assuming the appearance of a lover or another desirable figure to lead them astray.

The Sihuanaba also targets children by assuming the appearance of their mother or another trusted female figure. After luring the child to a remote location, the entity makes physical contact, which is said to induce madness. She subsequently abandons the child in the wilderness, leaving them lost and severely traumatized.

== Defence ==
Within Central American folklore, various traditional practices rooted in religious faith and regional custom are believe to offer protection against the sihuanaba. In the border regions of Guatemala and El Salvador, oral traditions dictate that an individual who encounters it can neutralize her influence by making the sign of the cross or by biting the blade of a machete. These actions are said to sever the spirit's hold over the victim, dispelling the accompanying panic and disorientation while driving the supernatural entity away.

== Etymology ==
The term sihuanaba originates from Mesoamerican indigenous languages, though several specific etymologies have been proposed. In parts of Mexico, the entity is known as macihuatli, a Nahuatl compound combining cihuatl ("woman") and matlatl ("net"). Conceptually translated as "net-woman", the term figuratively describes a being who ensnares men within her metaphorical web of attraction.

Similarly, cigua or cegua, regional names for the spirit in Honduras, Nicaragua, and Costa Rica, derive directly from the Nahuatl word cihuatl, meaning "woman".

Guatemalan historian and folklorist Adrián Recinos proposed two distinct origins for the name siguanaba. In one account, he posited that ciguanaba translates to "naked woman" in an unspecified Guatemalan dialect. In a separate source, he traced the term to the Nahuatl words ciuanauac or ciguanauac, which translate to "concubine".

In Guatemalan mythology, the word siguanaba is frequently connected through popular etymology to the Kʼicheʼ Maya word siwan, meaning cliff or deep ravine. However, this proposed linguistic origin remains disputed by several Mesoamerican scholars, including Adrián Recinos and Roberto Paz.

== Regional variations ==
=== Spain ===
Similar themes also appear across different cultures worldwide. A prominent European counterpart is found in Spanish folklore, particularly in the province of Asturias, with the legend of the lavanderas (washerwomen).

These entities are typically described as ghostly figures who wash clothes along riverbanks on moonless nights, almost always serving as omens of death. While often depicted as old women dressed in black with white hair, some versions closely mirror the Latin American myth. In these variants, the spirit disguises itself as a beautiful woman to lure men closer, only to reveal a monstrous appearance and kill them

=== El Salvador ===
In Salvadoran folklore, the myth of La Siguanaba traces her origins to a peasant woman named Sihuehuet, meaning "beautiful woman". According to legend, she used her charm and a witch's potion to seduce and marry Yeisun, a Nahuatl prince and son of the god Tláloc.

However, her loyalty proved brief. When Yeisun left for war, Sihuehet took multiple lovers, eventually giving birth to a son, Cipitío. She became a negligent mother, abandoning her child to pursue romantic affairs. Driven by ambition, she ultimately conspired to claim the throne for one of her lovers by poisoning Yeisun with a magical potion during a feast.

The plan backfired disastrously. Transformed into a savage, two-headed monster, Yeisun tore through the palace feast, slaughtering the guests. Only after a desperate battle did the royal guards manage to slay the beast and end Yeisun's life.

When Tláloc discovered the tragedy, he appealed to the supreme god, Teotl, who laid a devastating curse upon Sihuehuet. Renaming her Sihuanaba ("hideous woman"), he condemned her to a dual existence: alluring from afar, but revealing a hideous, terrifying form in close proximity.

Stripped of her humanity, she was forced to wander the Salvadoran countryside, haunting isolated rivers and streams. Though she primarily targets men traveling alone at night, she can appear at any hour; forever searching for her lost son, Cipitío, whom Teotl cursed to remain a deformed child for eternity.

=== Guatemala ===
In Guatemala, the Siguanaba is said to be encountered washing her hair with a golden bowl and combing her hair with a golden comb. She is said to wander the streets of Guatemala City, luring away men who are in love. In Guatemala, the legend is more common in Guatemala City, Antigua Guatemala (the old colonial capital) and the eastern departments of the country. The most common variant in these areas is that where the spirit has the face of a horse. In Guatemala the Siguanaba is often said to appear to men who are unfaithful in order to punish them.

A Kaqchikel Maya version of the Siguanaba from San Juan Comalapa describes her as a woman with enormous glowing eyes and a hoof for a hand. She wears a glittering dress and has very long hair and haunts the local rubbish dump, frightening disobedient children and drunken husbands.

On the Guatemalan side of Lake Güija, in Jutiapa Department, the Siguanaba is able to take on many forms but the most common is that of a slim, beautiful woman with long hair who bathes herself on the banks of the Ostúa River, although she may also appear by other water sources or simply by lonely roadsides. To lustful men she appears just as a beautiful woman, while to lovestruck men she takes the form of the object of the man's affections. A tale from San Juan La Isla relates how a man went to meet his wife who was returning on horseback from El Salvador, and after accompanying her for a while his "wife" flung herself from her mount and revealed herself to be the Siguanaba. In this same region, the Siguanaba is said to appear on moonlit nights to horseriders on lonely roads, asking to ride pillion. After riding with her victim for a short while, she reveals her fingernails as fearsome claws and her face as that of a horse, causing the rider to die of terror. Those lucky few that manage to flee find themselves lost in the wilderness.

=== Mexico ===
In Mexico, the legend of the Siguanaba is present in almost the entire country, mostly throughout Mesoamerica, where they call her Macihuatli, Matlazihua, X'tabay, X'tabal or, more popularly, "horse-faced woman". Some even relate her to La Llorona.

There are multiple testimonies and stories about this horror. Their common trait is that she can only be seen at night on lonely roads or places, showing herself to night owls, partiers, womanizers, and/or drunkards. She presents herself as a woman with an attractive body, always seen from her back or walking away, with her face completely covered by either her hair or a large veil. The victim is fascinated and attracted to the beautiful woman, whom he decides to approach, plying her with compliments and flirtation.

She always ignores him and tries to hide her face even more, and when the victim insists, she turns to reveal that she has a horse's head and red eyes. Sometimes she says things like, "Do I still look beautiful to you?" or "I also like you a lot." The victim may scream in terror and flee, swearing never to drink again. If the victim is "touched," they die shortly thereafter, despite attempts by the family to "take him to clean" or "cure him of dread." Her appearance plays a sobering role that brings a consequence for a specific behavior, unlike La Llorona, whose victims can be anyone. The Siguanaba is an entity that enforces compliance with the classic recommendations of a grandmother or mother to young men: "don't go out now, and behave well."

It should be mentioned that sometimes her face varies. In addition to a horse's head, she can also have the head of a dog, a pig, an old woman's face, a skull, or a disfigured and bloody face. Likewise, the horse's head also varies: it can be that of a normal horse, a horse's skull, a putrefied head, a face with rotten meat, or a horse face with skin.

In the state of Nayarit, there is a version similar to the Salvadoran version. According to the Nayarit version, she was a woman or a moon goddess who was the wife of the god Tlaloc, with whom she had a son, who treated her badly and abandoned her. She was unfaithful to her husband, who, after discovering her actions, cursed her calling her Sihuanaba, which means 'horrible woman'. He condemned to wander the countryside, appearing to men at first as a beautiful woman, but revealing a hideous horse face by the time they got close. She has always been seen more frequently on roads, rivers, fields, and elsewhere. Her victims are mainly infidels, whom she attracts to drive them crazy or kill them.

In the state of Coahuila, within the city of Torreón, this terrible specter that frightens men was a woman who received a curse or was the victim of witchcraft, black magic, or a satanic ritual, so she became an evil or a demonic entity seeking "revenge." They tend to appear to lustful people, womanizers, or night owls. Another version tells that she was a beautiful young woman who received a curse, turning her into this being. The young woman would appear normal at first, but when she approached was approached, her face would become that of a horse, frightening everyone away, condemning her to never find true love and be alone forever.

In the state of Nuevo León, they say that she is seen on the roads at night in search of machistas, gangsters, womanizers, the lustful, or any man who goes astray to kill them. She is also said to cause accidents.

In Mexico City, according to the Mexica, the Macihuatli was a moon deity called Metztli, who suffers the betrayal of their husband Tláloc. Other versions indicate that she was a woman of lousy behavior, which is why she was cursed by her husband or her father-in-law to wander as a ghost hunting men. Today, in some versions, she is described as a woman with a skull similar to that of a horse and with legs of a horse, which is beautiful at first glance, but up close is a monstrous being. In colonial legends she frightened night owls, rapists, or women who walked in bad steps, taking them to ravines and then killing then. There is a story of a supposed encounter between Hernán Cortés and this creature.

In the state of Puebla, she is known as the Andalona, where it is described as a specter that has multiple forms; she is said to seduce men who roam the mountains in order to drive them mad or kill them. Some say she dresses in white, has chicken feet and floats in the air.

In the state of Guerrero, she is known as the Chaneca, where she is said to be the fruit of a relationship between a common woman and a chaneque. She was given the opportunity to get to know the outside world. She fell in love, but men rejected her. For that reason, she decided to take revenge on men by seducing them and then killing them.

In Oaxaca, where he is known as the Matlazihua or Bandolera, he is associated with a "Zapotec" deity of death, known as Mictecacihuatl, who was in charge of collecting the souls of the deceased to take them to the underworld, and was the consort of Mictlantecuhtli, the lord of the dead. She is also believed to be the soul in pain of a woman who was cruel and murderous, and wanders in this world as a punishment. This specter is said to punish people's wrongdoings, or sins, but she generally appears to men (especially drunkards, womanizers, partygoers, or those who abandon their families). She appears to them as a beautiful woman of mixed race, who draws them towards a ravine, and when they approach her she reveals her horse face (or human skull, according to other versions; although also most of the time her face is not seen). This sight causes the man to fall into the ravine--leading them to suicide--and into the thorns so that they can bleed to death, although there are times when the victim survives, waking up in the thorns, in pain and without remembering anything that happened. Other versions that say that the Matlazihua bathes or combs her hair in the rivers of Oaxaca, and whoever invades her space or takes her comb suffers the consequences. In other versions, like the Guatemalan and Nicaraguan versions, it is stated that she is not a single being, but that there are several that even cooperate with each other to scare their victims, communicating with each other with whistles, and leave the men stunned.

In the state of Durango, she is better known as the Caballona, where she also appears to men with sinful behavior. Here she devours or warns them. In the state of Jalisco, she is generally described as a woman dressed entirely in black, and she also appears to lovers and drunkards.

In the state of Aguascalientes, especially in the city of Calvillo, it is believed that the horse-faced woman was a beautiful woman who was unfaithful to him with many suitors (or with her lover, according to other versions). But, one day, the husband discovered her doing one of her infidelities with her lover, who, in an incredible state of jealousy, killed her lover. In the meantime, he tied his hands with a rope and, holding her by the horse, he made a swift run. This caused the poor woman to be seriously injured and her face was disfigured, which looked like a horse. The injuries were so severe that he ended up dying. Since then, it is said that, at night, an attractive woman can be seen walking who seduces men with bad behavior (especially unfaithful men), as punishment; to later reveal that he has a horse's face. In the town square, there is a monument of the Horse Face Woman, of which many of the inhabitants do not know the legend and its origin.

In the southeast of the republic, they call it the Xtabay or Xtabal, which is, according to Mayan legend, an evil spirit that lives in ceiba trees and seduces anyone who comes near some of these trees. This was a Mayan goddess, dominated as Íxtab, who was the goddess of the hanged, the latter rewarded suicides with heaven but, with the arrival of Christianity, she is now their punisher and a demon woman who scares the men. A second version tells that it was a Mayan princess named Suluay, daughter of Governor Halach Huinic, who had fallen in love with a young warrior and they saw each other in a ceiba tree. And that it was sent by the granddaughter of a witch, who spell it killing her immediately. Then they left the body in the bush. Although there are other versions that say that warrior was an assistant to the witch to help her kill Suluay. Well, whatever the origin of the Xtabay, it is said that it is a woman who appears in the ceibo trees, combing her long black hair, waiting for a man to approach her and start seducing them, to later reveal her true identity: demonic-looking and face with horse features (disfigured face or a pale woman's face with yellow eyes and snake tongue, according to other versions). Sometimes she lets them go, which drives them crazy or, at other times, they die of fright. Sometimes, she is seen as a punisher for drunks, womanizers and infidels, whom she chooses because they are easier to deceive and catch.

An important version is the Concan version (from the town of Concá) of Querétaro of the Siguanaba, where it is said that it appears in a lake, under a bridge, which is known as the "Puente del Sapo". It is said that the Siguanaba appears as a beautiful woman who bathes naked to attract men, and always turns her back. The men approaching start talking to her while trying to see her face, many despair after waiting for a while to see her face; when they finally do they find that the woman who was supposed to have a beautiful face, has a horse's head that smiles at them maliciously, for which many flee. And the demonic spirit stays to continue its "ritual of conquest". Many, at night, fear and avoid passing by so that the horrifying appearance comes out and fear that the legend is true.

Finally, there is the Chiapas version. In this last version, it is known as the Nöwayomo, Tisigua, or Tishanila. In some regions or places it is considered as an evil spirit and in others as a benign spirit. It is said that she is the wife of El Sombrerón. It is said that she appears to men who are unfaithful, bathes in any lake and when they approach it she reveals a demonized horse face (or a disfigured face, according to the best known versions) that kills them or lets them go. Many of the unfortunate ones who have seen her change forever. Many of their relatives notice that they no longer eat and see that, in a corner or anywhere, they are seen sitting or standing waiting for the Tisigua or Tishanila. In other regions of Chiapas, it is also said that the Siguanaba may appear on the roads asking motorcyclists to climb it and, after a while of walking, she transforms into a monster with the head of a horse. In other regions she is known like the Yegualcíhuatl who, like the Mayan and Oaxacan version, bewitches men with her beautiful body, leads them to a ravine, and then causes them to fall down the ravine, killing them. It is said that they see that the woman, instead of walking, is floating through the air, but they do not give so much importance to wanting to reach her. In addition, some also sign that she is accompanied by the Cadejo and together they are in charge of scaring men out of living a bad life.

=== Honduras ===
In Honduras, she is known as "La Sucia" or Cigua. The most popular story describes her as a beautiful young woman denied marriage at the altar because she was unbaptized. She then wandered out of mind, never removing her increasingly filthy wedding dress until she died of heartbreak after her suitor married another woman. The story follows that she appears in beautiful form to lure men roaming drunk by rivers and streams, so enraptured by her beauty they follow her until she changes into a filthy horror that drives men crazy.

=== Costa Rica ===
In Costa Rica, this spectre is known by the name of Cegua, a spectre that is characterized by its face--that of a dead horse in a state of decomposition. In this country, La Cegua is a myth that is most common in rural areas, although the figure's actions are generally the same as in the rest of Mexico and Central America (especially her habit of bathing at night). La Cegua particularly sometimes appears among herds of horses, mounted on one of these, which causes panic. Other popular versions say that the Cegua appears on the roads as a beautiful woman before the womanizers or drunkards, who are asked to take her to her horse (or car or motorcycle, according to more modern versions). She is described as a very pretty young woman, white, with an oval face, large black eyes, long curly black hair (or brunette, depending on the version), and a beautiful mouth, with lips red as blood, with a divine voice that lulls like siren song, and a slender body with pronounced curves. She is dressed in full black or white, or on some occasions, in a vaporous pink dress or a luxurious period dress.

Legend has it that no man can resist such a beautiful body and sweet plea, which makes them climb it. Once climbing the woman, after a while of riding, she transforms into a monster with a head similar to that of a horse. La Cegua also appears to those womanizing men who walk late at night on the street, she appears to them and with her sweetness makes them believe that she is a new conquest, but later shows them her horse face. The Cegua can also appear in the form of a child who cries inconsolably on the side of the road or near a river, and when the rider picks him up and puts him on the horse to calm him, he transforms into the monster with horse face.

In Costa Rica, it is believed that La Cegua was a young libertine who had been denied permission to go to a party by her mother. When she tried to hit her mother, her mother cursed her. Still others also affirm that it is a demonic manifestation, like the Devil.

In the province of Guanacaste, La Cegua, in addition to appearing to men on the roads, could also appear at dances and festivals in the towns, where she flirts with every man who approaches her. The one who manages to win her, accompanies her to the clearing of the Guanacaste pampa, and under a leafy Guanacaste tree, surrenders to her love affairs. Late at night, when the man finally tries to kiss her, the metamorphosis occurs.

=== Nicaragua ===
In Nicaragua, she is also known as the Cegua (or also Ceguanaba or Ceguanagua). In this country, Cegua is also more present in rural areas and her actions are the same as in other countries. It is said that she was a witch who was betrayed by her partner and that she is looking for revenge against the womanizing men and night owls, for which she made a pact with the devil in a cornfield, where she performed a ritual to vomit her soul and begin a transformation. First, she transformed her face into that of a skeletal mare. Following that, the rest of her body transformed: her legs become as long and robust as a horse's hind legs, and her feet and arms got bigger, giving her great physical strength and speed, which ensure that her victim cannot escape. After this transformation, the Cegua would walk through the fields in search of womanizers and night owls to punish their behavior. When the rider or night owl is not cautious, the Cegua would ambush him first, playing with him, then tormenting him but not killing him immediately. The specter seizes the man and bites his cheek to mark him as an adulterer, leaving him crazy and scared to death. Of those who were left alive, they remain in a state of idiocy. From there, the Nicaraguan popular saying derives: "It is played by Cegua." There are also stories that there is not just one Cegua, but several, that can cooperate to catch victims. Other versions include the Cegua as a beautiful girl who, when a man approaches, turns into a horrendous old woman.

There is also another version of the legend, from the department of León, which describes her as an ugly and old woman, with long white hair, breasts down to her stomach, who laughs mockingly. When she has her victim, who are men and boys, trapped, she offers him one of her breasts; it terrifies him until it drives him crazy. And still today, it is said that the Cegua also appears in the trees of Guanacaste, where a womanizer or night owl awaits her, under a beautiful veil. When the man approaches, she lifts her veil, showing a horrible skull in a decomposed state.

=== Panama ===
In Panama, this entity is known as the Empollerada Woman. As in Costa Rica and Nicaragua, she is said to punish drunk and womanizing men who travel by transport. She is described as a woman of great beauty who is very brooding and very well groomed; hence her name. Upon seeing her, she would convince the man to put her on his horse (or car, according to modern accounts). When turning to look lasciviously at the young woman, the man finds that he has mounted a specter on his horse who, instead of the head of a woman, now presents herself with the face of a human skull (or, in the most versions, as a hatched skeleton), thus terrifying the man. In this version, the ghost originated as a woman who committed suicide because her boyfriend or lover was unfaithful to her, and her spirit wanders in search of revenge, punishing womanizers and drunkards like her partner.

Other spellings are: Cihuanaba, Sihuanaba, Ciguanaba, Ciguapa.

== See also ==
- List of fictional horses
- Kuchisake-onna
- La Llorona
- Headless priest
- Madam Koi Koi
- Neck (water spirit)
- Patasola - similar figure in Colombia
- Qandisa
- Rusalka
- Sayona - a Venezuelan phantom figure similar to La Sihuanaba
- Tikbalang
- Vengeful ghost
- Anggitay
- Yuki-onna
