= Patasola =

Vampire-like creature in South American folklore

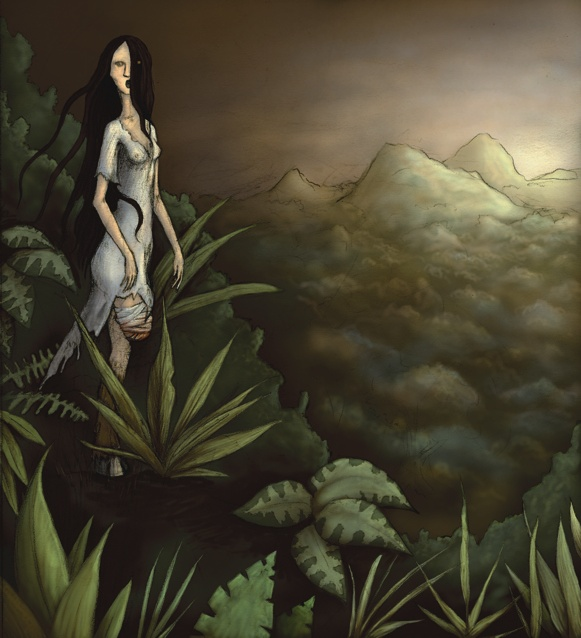
Patasola literal translation is Pata=foot & Sola=single, only

The Patasola or "single leg" is one of many legends in Colombian folklore about a female monster from the jungle, appearing to male hunters or loggers in the middle of the wilderness if they think about women. The Patasola appears in the form of a beautiful seductive woman, often in the likeness of a loved one, who lures a man away from his companions, deep into jungle. There, the Patasola reveals its true, hideous appearance as a one-legged creature with ferocious vampire-like lust for human flesh and blood, attacking and devouring the flesh or sucking the blood of her victims.

== Location ==
According to popular belief, it inhabits mountain ranges, virgin forests, and other heavily wooded or jungle-like areas. At the edges of these places and primarily at night, it lures male hunters, loggers, miners, millers, and animal herders. It also interferes with their daily activities, such as blocking shortcuts through the jungle, disorienting hunters, and throwing hunting dogs off the scent of their game. The patasola is usually regarded as protective of nature and the forest animals and unforgiving when humans enter their domain to alter or destroy them.

== Physical description ==
The Patasola's most notable feature, from which her name derives, is her one leg which end in a cleaved bovine-like hoof. She moves in a plantigrade fashion. Despite only possessing one leg, the Patasola can move swiftly through the jungle. In her natural state, she has a terrifying appearance; she is described as possessing one breast, bulging eyes, catlike fangs, a hooked nose, and big lips.

The Patasola can metamorphose into different shapes and appearances. She commonly takes on the appearance of a beautiful woman to lure men to their death. She then uses her feline-type fangs to suck the blood from her victims. It is also believed that she can transform into other animals, materializing as a large black dog or cow.

According to Javier Ocampo Lopez, when pleased, the Patasola climbs to the top of a tree or mountain and sings the following song:

"I'm more than the sirey
I live alone in the world:
and no one can resist me
because I am the Patasola.
On the road, at home,
on the mountain and the river,
in the air and in the clouds
all that exists is mine."

== Mythical origins ==
The Patasola's origin story varies, but usually follows the pattern of a scorned, unfaithful, or otherwise bad woman. Some believe that she was a mother who killed her own son and was then banished to the woods as punishment. Others believe that she was a wicked temptress who was cruel to both men and women and for this reason they mutilated her with an axe, chopping off one leg and throwing it into a fire. She then died of her injuries and now haunts the forests and mountain ranges. In a third origin story, she was an unfaithful wife who cheated on her husband with the couple's employer, a patron. Upon discovering her infidelity, the jealous husband murdered both her and the patron. She died but her soul remains in a one-legged body.

== Similar creatures ==
There are legendary creatures that bear a resemblance to the Patasola in other Latin American countries, such as the Tunda myth of the Colombian Pacific region which also tells of a vicious woman who sucks the blood of men. However, in this legend, "La Tunda's shape-shifting abilities are far from perfect…for whatever form she assumes will invariably have a wooden leg in the shape of a molinillo (wooden whisk). The monster, however, is very cunning, and is adept at concealing this defect from would-be victims."

There is also "Matlacihua, a phantasm in the beautiful and svelte form of a woman dressed in white. Sometimes called the White Lady or the Bride, she would appear at night and with her seductive songs and irresistible beauty, lure men of bad conduct into the forest, scaring them half to death." Though not described as sucking the blood of her victims, the White Lady supposedly deterred men from seeking amorous relations in the woods, jungles, or mountain ranges.

Some versions of stories about Sayona have her appear to men working in the forest who mention women. She lures them away into the forest in the form of a beautiful woman or loved one so she can reveal her animal-like true self and devour or mangle them, leaving their bodies to be found by their companions.

== See also ==
- Caipora
- Chullachaqui
- Fiura
- Monopod (creature)
- Nasnas
- Sihuanaba, a similar figure from Central America
