= Cadejo =

Creature in Central American folklore

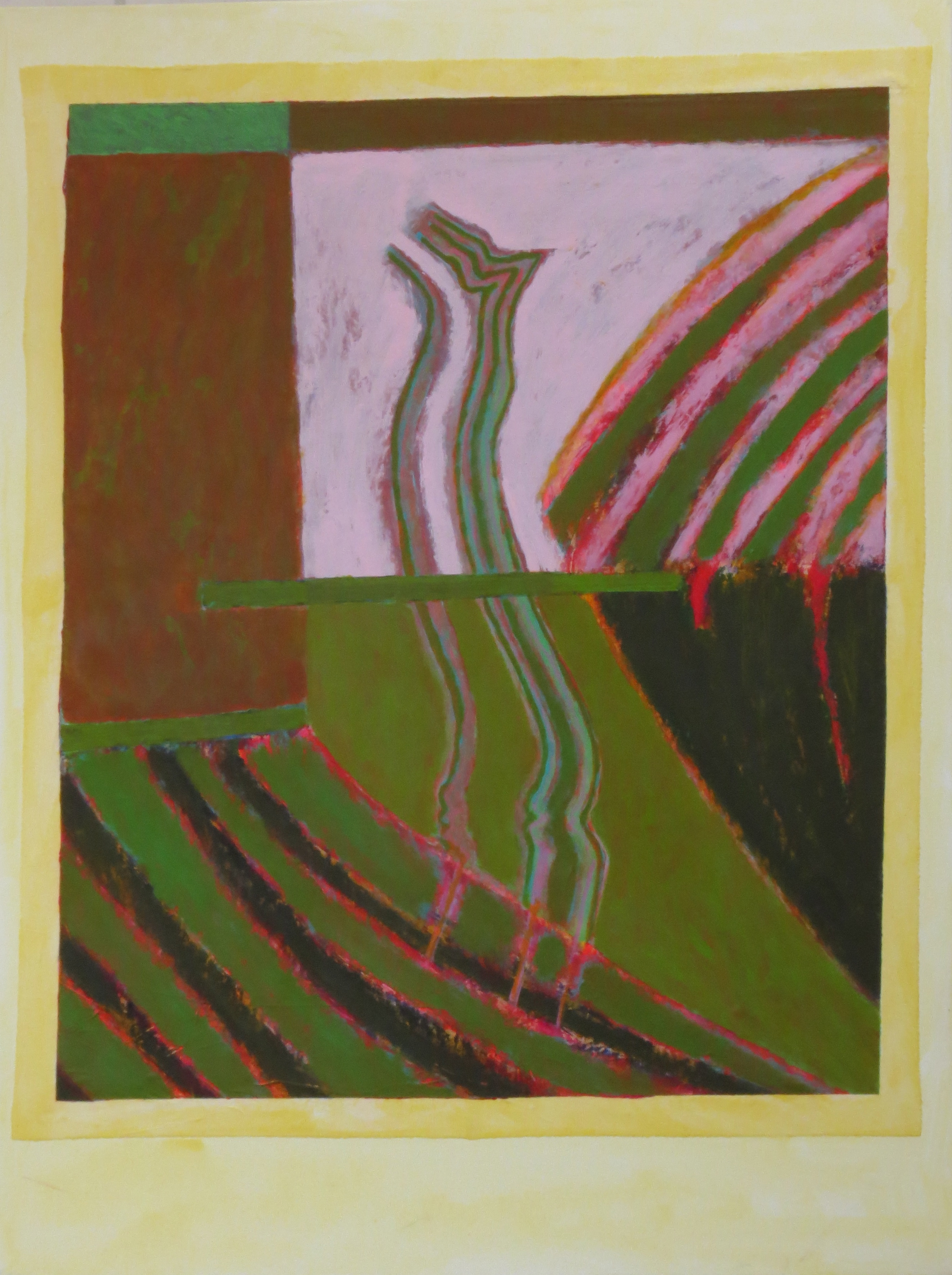
A 2011 painting by Carlos Loarca depicting el Cadejo

The cadejo (Spanish pronunciation: [kaˈðexo]) is a supernatural spirit in Central American folklore of indigenous origin. It is commonly depicted as a dog-like creature with blue eyes when calm and red eyes when hostile. According to legend, it wanders along isolated roads at night.

The myth is also present in several states of Mexico.

According to folklore, there are two forms of the Cadejo: a benevolent white cadejo and an evil black cadejo. Both are said to appear to travelers at night. The white cadejo protects travelers from harm and danger, while the black cadejo attempts to kill them (it is sometimes regarded as an incarnation of the devil). In Costa Rica and Panama, the cadejo is instead described as a single black creature that, despite its monstrous appearance, is generally considered harmless. In Costa Rica and Nicaragua, the creature is also known as el cadejos.

They are usually described as large, shaggy dogs, sometimes said to be as large as a cow, with glowing red eyes and goat-like hooves, however, they are said to possess more unusual or grotesque features.

In traditional accounts, many have attempted to kill the black cadejo but have failed and died in the process. It is said that when a cadejo is killed, its body emits a foul odor for several days before disappearing.

Guatemalan and Salvadoran folklore also tells of a cadejo that protects drunk people from those who wish to rob or harm them. Its presence is said to be accompanied by a strong, goat-like odor. It is said that turning one's back on the cadejo or speaking to it can cause insanity.

== Origins of the legend ==
Although the term cadejo is of Spanish origin, the mythological roots of the creature are primarily associated with Maya mythology and the shamanistic traditions of the Nahua peoples of Mesoamerica. Indigenous traditions frequently describe shamans and naguals capable of assuming animal forms for religious and funerary rituals involving jade ornaments, animal skins, bird feathers, and masks. Among Mesoamerican cultures, dogs were regarded as companions to the dead on their journey to the afterlife. The legend is therefore a product of cultural syncretism and a remnant of the ancient belief that every person possesses an animal companion. The mythical animal is believed to be a person's spiritual counterpart, with the fate of one closely linked to that of the other. In modern terms, this belief can be compared with the Western religious concept of a guardian angel, which is believed to protect an individual from danger.

== Description ==
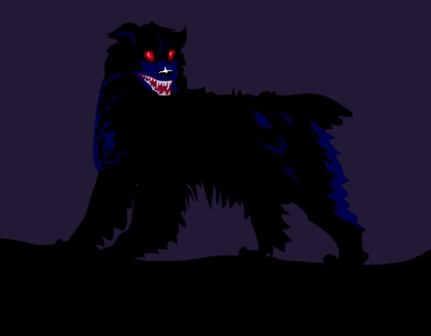
The most common description of the Cadejo is that of a large black dog with glowing eyes.

The most prolific descriptions correspond to the black Cadejo. All agree that it is a large black dog with red eyes like embers, which drags heavy chains. The Costa Rican writer Carlos Luis Fallas, in the glossary of the novel Marcos Ramírez, describes it as "a fantastic animal, with phosphorescent eyes and thick fur, black and very long". Another version from Costa Rica also adds goat legs and jaguar teeth. Likewise, in this same country, it also appears with completely brown fur on certain occasions. In some versions from Nicaragua, it is capable of manipulating its body to grow, in the manner of a giant dog. In his story El Cadejo, the Salvadoran writer José Efraín Melara Méndez describes it as "a kind of small dog that followed people but did not harm them. Although sometimes people did not see it, they heard its characteristic footsteps similar to those of a goat." For the Honduran writer Jesús Aguilar Paz, "one must not confuse the Duende with the Cadejo: the latter is a nocturnal quadruped that feeds on putrefying corpses, and when it walks its bones rattle; its eyes are luminous and encountering it is dangerous." Miguel Ángel Asturias omits that it has the form of a dog, and incorporates three different species into one body, "with goat hooves, rabbit ears, and a bat's face".

Curiously, in the Yucatán Peninsula, it is described as a being "half dog, half man", possibly a kind of ghostly anthropomorph (Winik Peek’, in Yucatec Maya).

== Defence ==
As with many spectral beings, folklore traditions also describe ways to defend oneself against a cadejo. In Honduras, it is said that to repel the black cadejo one should recite phrases such as "it smells of holiness", "it smells of incense", or "excuse me, compadre Alejo". In his novel Marcos Ramírez, the Costa Rican writer Carlos Luis Fallas recounts an episode in which a peasant confronts a cadejo; after failing to attack it with a cross-shaped weapon, he drives the spirit away by threatening it with the cross on the weapon's hilt, exclaiming: "You may defeat the blade, wretch, but the Cross defeats you!".

== See also ==
- Hellhound

== Sources ==
- Burchell, Simon (2007). Phantom Black Dogs in Latin America, Heart of Albion Press. Edited by Triniti R.
- Fallas, Carlos Luis (2008). Marcos Ramírez [Marcos Ramírez] (in Spanish). Editorial Costa Rica. ISBN 978-9977-23-291-1.
- Ferrero, Luis (2002). Mil y tantos tiquismos: (costarricensismos) [A Thousand and More Costa Rican Expressions (Costa Ricanisms)] (in Spanish). Editorial Universidad Estatal a Distancia. ISBN 9968-311-81-2.
- Padilla, María Mayela (2013). Dichos y refranes de los ticos [Sayings and Proverbs of Costa Ricans] (in Spanish). San José de Costa Rica: Jadine. ISBN 978-9968-502-51-1.
- Zeledón Cartín, Elías (2000). Leyendas costarricenses [Costa Rican Legends] (in Spanish) (4th ed.). Heredia, Costa Rica: Editorial de la Universidad Nacional. ISBN 9977-65-133-7.
