= Jurupari =

Amazonian mythological hero or god

- Parents: Sun (father) and Ceucy (mother)
- Consort: Carumá

Jurupari or Iurupari (Nhengatu: Juruparý [ʒuɾupaˈɾɨ]) is a god or mythical hero known to indigenous peoples of Brazil and Colombia of the Tupi, Tucano, Arawak and Maku linguistic families. While on the Brazilian coast Jurupari was fought against as the Devil by Christian missionaries, in the northwest of the Amazon the legend intervenes in some important traditions such as the laws of Jurupari — or the laws of the Sun, his father —, the ritual of Jurupari, and within this, the sacred flutes and masks of Jurupari.

== The Tupi God ==
In Tupi religion and mythology, Jurupari is a forest spirit associated with feared phenomena, bad dreams, and punishments. Although often called a "demon" due to the Catholic adaptation made by the Jesuits in an attempt to demonize shamanism, in truth he embodies forces of nature, is a powerful and sometimes punitive entity, capable of bringing nightmares, asphyxiation during sleep, sleep paralysis, or misfortunes to those who disrespect the laws of nature and/or society. During the catechization process in colonial Brazil, missionaries adopted the name Jurupari to translate the concept of Satan. They also elevated Tupã (the god of water, the sea, rain, and thunder) to the position of supreme God, creating a "God vs. Devil" dualism that did not exist in the original native mythology.

At the time of the arrival of the first Europeans in Brazil (16th century), Jurupari was the most widely worshipped god among the Tupinambá, who dominated the Brazilian coast. To combat him, Catholic missionaries began to associate Jurupari with the Christian devil to discourage his worship among the natives. (Note: Cascudo's dictionary, p. 409: "Jurupari-demônio é uma imagem da entequese católica do século XVI".)

The French Franciscan friar and entomologist Claude d'Abbeville recorded in 1614 that the Tupinambá believed that Jeropary (whom he referred to as the Devil and contrasted with Tupã, for him the Christian god) persecuted the "cowardly and effeminate," who would reside with him in the afterlife. This was because the natives considered it a good life to be strong, brave, and accustomed to killing their enemies, being rewarded with eternal life "beyond the mountains" in Guajupiá (Uaiupia) alongside Our Great Father or Grandfather (Tamoï, "Tamũîa", "Grandfather" in Tupi, known as Ñane Ramõi, "Our Grandfather", by the Guarani; for the Tupi, the Great Father is the creator god Monã [pt]). Thus, Jurupari would be a god associated with warlike virtues, which were expressed among the Tupi in ways that d'Abbeville called "acts of barbarity and cruelty." There was, moreover, a valiant warrior named Jurupari who, amidst conflicts between the Portuguese and French in Maranhão, as d'Abbeville recounts, inspired other Tupinambá warriors with his bravery, even after they had been abandoned by the French, who surrendered and allied themselves with the Portuguese, to fight to the death rather than be enslaved by them, continuing a bloody war for a month. D'Abbeville also attributed to the god Jurupari the inspiration received by the ancient karaíbas, the Tupi prophets, who led multitudes on extensive journeys in search of the earthly paradise, leading to the death of many along the way.

Regarding the relationship between Jurupari and the spirits of the dead, the Swiss-American anthropologist Alfred Métraux, citing the French Capuchin friar and entomologist Yves d'Évreux [fr] (1577–1632), says that Jurupari protects graves and drives away the living with screams and frightening apparitions, and that he takes with him the souls of the wicked, called by the Tupi people anhang or añánga ("wandering spirit," "ghost"). The relationship between Jurupari and the anhang/añánga may have been one of the reasons why missionaries often confused him with the god Anhangá, treating both as the Devil. Métraux considers Jurupari an entity associated with the forest, feared and revered.

In his book O Selvagem (1876), Couto de Magalhães [pt] lists Jurupari among the superior deities of the Tupi people alongside Tupã, Anhangá, Cahapora or Cahipora, and Curupira (although elsewhere he states that the supreme trinity consists of Guaraci, Jaci, and Rudá). He disagrees that Jurupari is a malevolent god or comparable to Satan, even though he does not attribute to him, unlike the other Tupi deities, the beneficial action of protecting any part of Creation. He also reports that he did not find Jurupari's presence in the myths of the southern Tupi (Guarani), only in the north of the Empire (from São Paulo to eastern Amazonia).

== The Legend of Jurupari ==
The "Legend of Jurupari" is an Amazonian founding mythical tale that is known from the transcription made from the version told at the end of the 19th century by the Brazilian indigenous Maximiano José Roberto and translated into Italian by Count Ermanno Stradelli. It is one of the great pre-Columbian texts that have survived along with the Popol Vuh.

The legend of Jurupari was common knowledge in the tribes of the Colombian-Brazilian Amazon, especially in the Vaupés River basin, having been transmitted orally.

At the end of the 19th century, Maximiano José Roberto wrote a version in the Nheengatu language with Latin characters. This version was lost and only the Italian version of the text by Ermanno Stradelli, published in the bulletin of the Italian Geographical Society in 1890 under the title Leggenda dell’ Jurupary, survived.

=== Summary of the legend ===
==== Birth of Ceucy ====
An epidemic struck the men and only a few old men and a pajé (or shaman) survived. To resolve what could be the end of the race, the women gathered at Lake Muypa, where the star-goddess Ceucy (the name given to the Pleiades) used to bathe. The women had not come to any solution when Ceucy came to bathe. At that moment the old pajé, who was present even though the women had not noticed, reprimanded them for having disobeyed his prohibition of approaching the lake. As a consequence, Ceucy would no longer bathe there and from then on women could not participate in important matters. The pajé then impregnated all the women. Ten moons later all the women gave birth at the same time and among the newborns a girl stood out for her beauty who was called Ceucy, because she was as beautiful as the Ceucy of the sky.

==== Birth of Jurupari ====
When she reached the age of first love, Ceucy, still pure, was tempted to eat the mapati or pihycan fruit (presumably the piquia, a nut from the Amazon region). She easily found some and the fruit juices fertilized her. She tried to hide her condition, but eventually it was impossible and she confessed the story of the mapati/pihycan. When the child was born he resembled the Sun because of his great beauty. The Tenuiana (inhabitants of the Tenui Mountains) proclaimed him their tuixaua, their chief, and called him Jurupari, which means "the one who covers the mouth", because men would keep the secrets of his religion.

In addition to Jurupari/Iurupari, the civilizing hero and Son of the Sun is also known as Izí ("the one who originated from the fruit"), Bocan ("Bad Heart" [for those who do not follow his law]) and Maasanqueró.

==== Disappearance of Jurupari ====
One moon after Jurupari was born, the people decided to give him the chief's insignia, but the itá-tuixaua, the "chief's stone", was missing, so they had to go to the Moon Hook Mountain Range to get it back. But the women divided the tribe into two groups: some said that everyone should go for the stone, others that only the men should go because the women could not touch it. They argued over a moon until they realized that Jurupari had disappeared.

The women blamed the old men and threatened to give them "the torture of the fishes," a torture that consisted of tying the body in the water, leaving the head out, and wounding them so that the fish, attracted by the taste of blood, would come and devour them. They even went so far as to tie up the men so that they could not escape.

During the night, they heard Jurupari's cry coming from the mapati/pihycan tree. When they reached it, everything was silent. The second night the cry was repeated and they searched among the branches of the mapati/pihycan but found nothing. The third night they surrounded the tree but began to hear the cry among themselves, without being able to discover its origin. The cry was so terrifying that they decided not to search for Jurupari again.

Although the crying did not stop, everyone forgot about Jurupari except Ceucy, who, secluded on the top of a mountain, cried for her son's absence until she fell asleep in the early hours of the morning. Three nights passed like this. One morning, when she woke up, she realized that there was no milk in her breasts. She tried to stay awake to see who was nursing, but she was overcome by sleep and the next day she woke up without milk.

Two years passed and the crying was replaced by laughter, singing and screams of a child playing with unknown beings. Jurupari grew strong, although invisible, while Ceucy grew old quickly, heartbroken without knowing anything about her son.

==== The return of Jurupari ====
Fifteen years later, on a moonlit night when the celestial Ceucy came to bathe in the lake, Jurupari reappeared in the village holding the hand of his mother, the earthly Ceucy. He was a young man as beautiful as the Sun, his father. The Tenuiana rushed to give him the chief's ornaments even though the itá-tuixaua was still missing.

1. He comes to replace the chaotic, matriarchal laws with the laws of the Sun, which are essentially patriarchal and orderly;
2. He also brings a set of rites, songs and myths about his ancestors;
3. He visits different tribes to instruct them on the new laws, and in each tribe he faces resistance from the women;
4. Among his own disciples there are some traitors and others faithful to him;
5. He finds love in a woman named Carumá;
6. At the end of the story he travels to the East to look for a woman worthy of the Sun.

=== Criticisms ===
It is known that the Tupi name "Jurupari" is not original to the myths of the northwestern Amazon, but was brought by Christian missionaries and chroniclers in the service of colonization to rename the various cultural heroes of the Tucano, Arawak, and Maku peoples of the region of the Uaupés and Negro rivers and to combat their worship in the same way they did with the god of the Tupinambá on the Brazilian coast, where they considered him to be the Christian Devil.

In general, the myth of Jurupari the lawgiver revolves around three parts, varying in detail: the first part deals with the conception and birth, the name, the nature and, finally, the death of the hero; the second tells how the flutes came to be, which, reproducing his voice, symbolize the mythical being after his disappearance; the third tells of the struggle between men and women for possession of the flutes, from which, in the end, the men emerged victorious.

In 1905, the German ethnologist and anthropologist Paul Ehrenreich criticized the use of Tupi names in the description of the Jurupari legend published by the Italian Count Ermanno Stradelli in 1890, starting with the very name of the law-giving hero, which he said was actually Izi, meaning "Sun" in the Tucano language (actually, for the Tucanos the name of both the sun and the moon is Muhipu), and this would have nothing to do with the terrible Jurupari of the coast, whom Christian missionaries considered to be the Devil. Stradelli had translated into Italian the manuscript myth written in Nheengatu (modern Tupi) by Maximiano José Roberto, son of a Tariana mother (from the Arawak group, distinct from the Tupi).

Before Stradelli, others such as the French explorer Henri Coudreau in 1887, who used the name "Jurupari" (as in Portuguese), and the Brazilian ethnographer João Barbosa Rodrigues in 1890, who used the name "Yurupary" when recording a legend of Izi in Nheengatu, also adopted the Tupi name for the Arawak divine hero.

In 1976, the German priest and ethnologist Wilhelm (Guilherme) Saake, while acknowledging that the name of the cultural hero and sacred flutes among the Baniwa people of the Içana River is Kuai (or Kuwai), intentionally changes his name to "Jurupari" when describing the myth as told by them.

The Brazilian painter and historian Angelo Guido, in his 1937's ’O Reino das Mulheres Sem Lei’ ("The Kingdom of Lawless Women"), is more careful in presenting the legend, constantly preferring to say "Izí or Iuruparí" to refer to the Son of the Sun.

The Tucano myth of Uakti, who, after being killed, gave rise to palm trees from whose musical instruments guarding his spirit women cannot see, under penalty of death, also served as the basis for the "myth of Jurupari". For the Desanos, the hero is known as Guramūye, son of a virgin mother, who created the male initiation rite in which boys become men, who was also burned and in his place grew the paxiúba palm, from which the sacred flutes are made; later Abe, the Sun, ordered his (unnamed) sleeping son and other men to take the flutes, which were in the possession of the women, and institute male dominion.

== Colombian legend ==
A version of the Yuruparí legend found in the Orinoquía and the Colombian Amazon areas has been discussed by Javier Ocampo López, who calls him the "civilizing god of Vaupés". Yuruparí is described as the deity of male dominance and adversary to the Amazon women. His religion sanctifies the holy flute, symbolic of the bones and the voice of the deity. (Note: Ocampo López (1996) citing Orjuela (1987), and Ocampo López (2006b))

During a party, Yuruparí was made drunk by the women and burned to ashes in a bonfire. His ashes turned into the first pachuba palm (Wettinia drudei), from which sacred flutes with the voice of Yuruparí could be made. However, during his death, the women stole back all the power-invested flutes from the men, and regained their matriarchy. Yuruparí came back to life, confiscating all the plants the women had stolen, and punished them. Yuruparí in death had also engendered the wild yuca plant, from which chicha is made, and this beverage is taken to be the deity's blood.

== The Jurupari ritual ==
The Jurupari ritual is basically a male initiation ritual, in which boys between 12 and 15 years old (the initiates) and the initiating pajé participate.

Women are not allowed to enter the ritual for the most part. During this celebration flutes and trumpets are used, which produce the roars of the ancestral Anaconda and Jaguar; they are made with paxiúba trunk, an Amazonian palm tree that produces a full and low sound. There are also the Jurupari masks, woven from monkey and women's hair and palm leaves. After this event, the initiates are ready to marry and carry out all the activities of an adult man, such as hunting, fishing and participating in the decisions of the village. In addition to being a coming of age ceremony, it is also a ritual of thanking nature for the abundance of fishing.

According to the description by Sílvia Maria S. Carvalho of what she calls the "Religion of Jurupari", in the Amazon region of the upper Rio Negro, this comprises a secret male cult, revealed to initiates mainly in the second initiation: its rites include flagellations, use of tobacco and coca, hallucinogens such as yagé (caapi), and, further west, also paricá.

Even in recent times, Christian missionaries, both Catholic and Protestant, have continued to combat the Jurupari rituals in the northwestern Amazon, including through violence, within a larger objective of eradicating the ancestral traditions that sustain the societies of these peoples, but they continue to sound the sacred flutes, resisting.

== See also ==
- List of solar deities
