= Isaac de Razilly =

Governor of Acadia

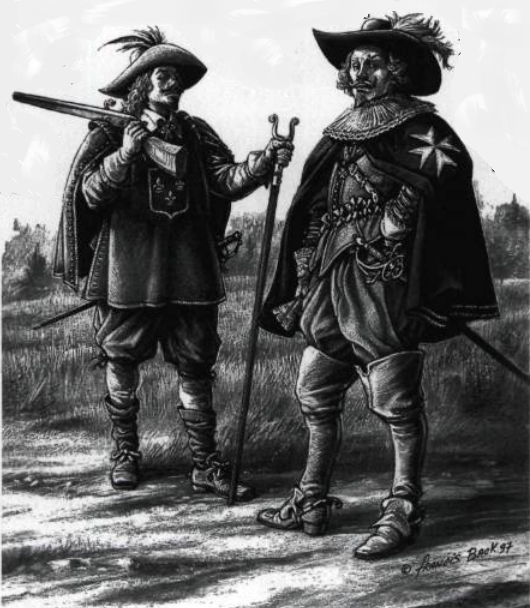
On the right, Governor Isaac de Razilly

Isaac de Razilly (1587–1635) was a member of the French nobility appointed a knight of the Order of St. John of Jerusalem at the age of 18. He was born at the Château d'Oiseaumelle in the Province of Touraine, France. A member of the French navy, he served for many years during which he played an important role in the French colony of Acadia in New France. He was the son of François de Razilly and Catherine de Villiers, brother of Claude de Razilly and François de Razilly.

== Brazil ==
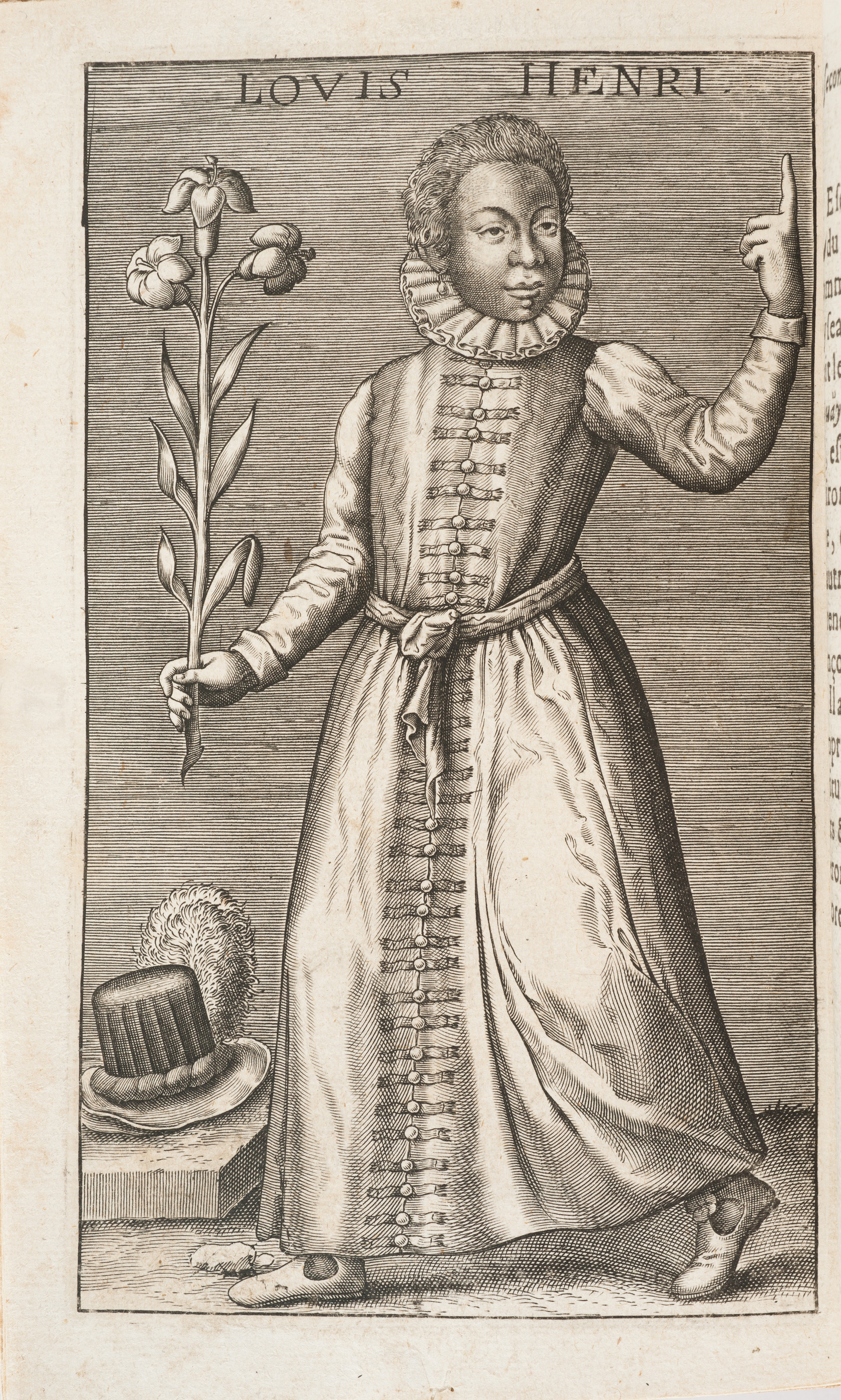
Tupinambá Indian "Louis Henri" at the court of Louis XIII, in Claude d'Abbeville, Histoire de la mission.

Isaac de Razily explored the coast of Brazil in 1612-15 near the island of Marajó, in the attempts to establish France Equinoxiale, with his brother and leader of the expedition François de Razilly.

== Morocco (1619–1624) ==
Issac de Razilly already sailed to Morocco in 1619, under the orders of Louis XIII who was considering a colonial venture in Morocco. He was able to reconnoiter the coast as far as Mogador.

In 1624, he was put in charge of an embassy to the pirate harbour of Salé in Morocco, in order to solve the affair of the library of Mulay Zidan. He was imprisoned and put under chains before being released, although he had to leave many Christian captives behind. The mission of Razilly was accompanied by the first Capuchins to establish themselves in Morocco.

== Blockade of La Rochelle (1625) ==
Razilly took part in the Blockade of La Rochelle during the suppression of the Huguenot rebellion, where he commanded the blockade fleet, and lost an eye there.

Soon after, in 1626, he wrote pamphlets advocating commercial expansion overseas, either in Africa, Asia or America, such as his Articles pour persuader un chacun de risquer sur mer et trouver fonds pour la navigation. He submitted the memorandum to Cardinal Richelieu.

== Morocco (1629) ==
As Richelieu and Père Joseph were attempting to establish a colonial policy, Razilly suggested them to occupy Mogador (Essaouira) in Morocco in 1626. The objective was to create a base against the Sultan of Marrakesh, and asphyxiate the harbour of Safi. He departed for Salé on 20 July 1629 with a fleet composed of the ships Licorne, Saint-Louis, Griffon, Catherine, Hambourg, Sainte-Anne, Saint-Jean. He bombarded the city the Salé and destroyed 3 corsair ships, and then sent the Griffon under [Treilleboi to Mogador. The men of Razilly saw the fortress of Castelo Real in Mogador, and landed 100 men with wood and supplies on Mogador island, with the agreement of Richelieu. After a few days however, the Griffon reimbarked the colonists, and departed to rejoin the fleet in Salé.

In 1630, Razilly was able to negotiate the purchase of French slaves from the Moroccans. He visited Morocco again in 1631, and participated to the negotiation of the Franco-Moroccan Treaty of 1632, with the help of descendants of Samuel Pallache (see Pallache family).

== Acadia (1632) ==
In 1632, Razilly became involved, at the request of Cardinal Richelieu, in the colonization of Acadia. Razilly landed at La Hève, now LaHave, Nova Scotia, with 300 men and 3 monks and built Fort Sainte Marie de Grace. He took possession of Port Royal to establish a French colony and offered the Scottish settlers to buy back their lands and give them a safe trip back to Scotland. To deal with a shortage of funds, a company was set up by Razilly and some of his friends which became known as the Razilly-Condonnier company. Together with the Compagnie de la Nouvelle France, an expedition was outfitted to sail to Acadia. The King gave Razilly the official title of lieutenant-general for New France.

One of his able lieutenants in Acadia was Charles de Menou d'Aulnay who was instrumental in maintaining the shipping to and from France. As well, he took on military tasks such as ordering the taking of control of Fort Pentagouet at Majabigwaduce on the Penobscot Bay, which had been given to France in an earlier Treaty, and to inform the English they were to vacate all lands North of Pemaquid. This was accomplished shortly before Razilly's death and resulted in all the French interests in Acadia being restored.

== Death ==
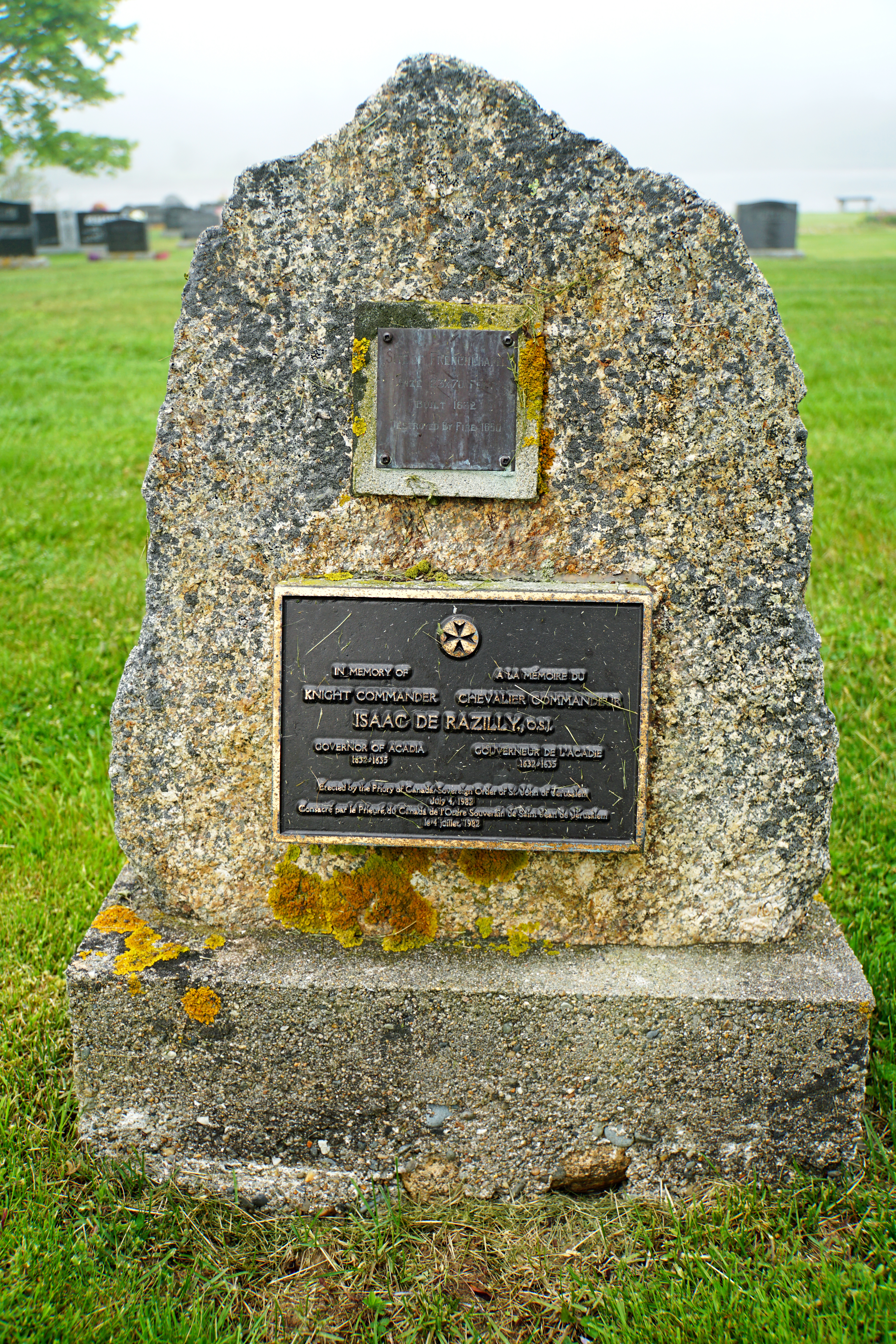
Isaac de Razilly Memorial in LaHave, Nova Scotia.

Razilly died suddenly at LaHave, Nova Scotia in December 1635.
