= Anhangá =

Brazilian indigenous worldview figure

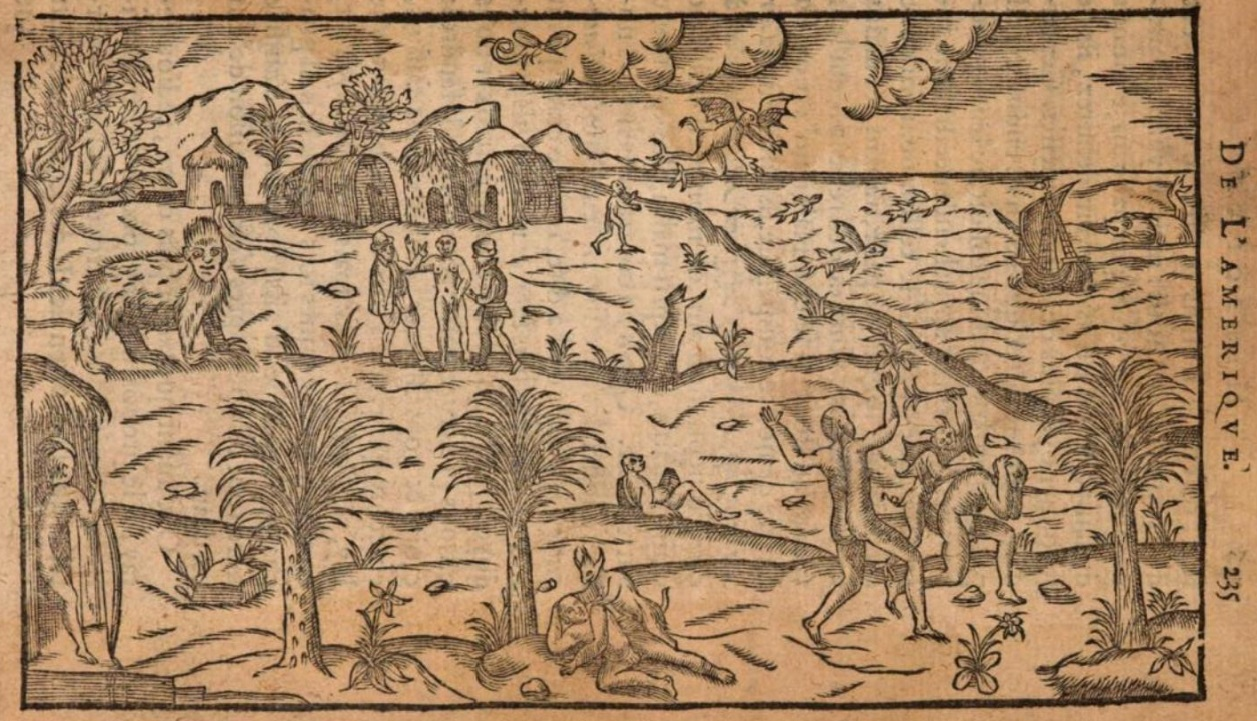
Aygnan (Anhangá) in the forms of birds and beasts, and other oddities, in Léry Histoire d'vn voyage (1580 edition).

Anhangá or Anhanga (Tupi: Anhang<añánga; Sateré-Mawé: Anhang/Ahiag Kag or Ahiãg; French: Agnan, aignen) is a type of spirit present in the cosmovision of several native groups from Brazil and Indianist literature.

The spirit is believed to torment the soul of the dead, manifested in nature as tempestuous noises. It also constantly afflicts the living with physical sensations of being beaten, appearing in the forms of birds and beasts and other strange beings (also as armadillo, the pirarucu fish, etc. according to modern collected lore). It particularly afflicts hunters with madness and fever, especially if they target females (does) with young, as it is a guardian of wildlife game in the open field (or the forest, according to modern sources), and as such, usually appears in the guise of white deer with fiery eyes. People also feared the presence of Anhangá during funerary rituals, where the virtuous dead are supposed to journey to the elysian Land Without Evils.

== Nomenclature ==
Anhanga is sometimes styled Anhan, and transliterated in French sources as agnan, aignan, aignen, aygnan, etc. (Note: Or Ingange in German transliteration given by Hans Staden in True History: An Account of Cannibal Captivity in Brazil (1557). The notes by list a number of differently spelt transliterations into French or Portuguese.)

=== Etymology ===
A suggested etymology of Anhanga is anho "alone" + anga "ghost, spirit". (Note: According to José de Alencar's novel Iracema)

==== Bantu false cognate ====
Those of African banto descent in Brasil thought Anhanga might derive from their mother tongue due to coincidental similarities, but this is an instance of folk etymology and false cognate. Black hunters in Brazil "naturally" reinterpreted Anhanga in terms of words in their Imbundo language, namely n'hanga for "hunt" and ri-nhanga "hunter".

=== Aliases ===
The Anhan is the same as Jurupari in certain contexts, or else, Jurupari is the spirit's name prevalent among the Northern Tupi.

It is also otherwise known as Kaagere. (Note: Barbosa Rodrigues tries to identify the supposedly fabulous deer "Suessú anhanga" with real fauna, the çuaçu kaatinga ('deer of white foliage/forest' or 'deer of the Caatinga') of Sul (the South[?]), scientifically named Cervus simplicicornis by Johann Karl Wilhelm Illiger.)

=== Accented spelling ===
As for the spelling anhanga vs. anhangá, writer Machado de Assis explained how the diacritical mark placement and change in pronunciation evolved:

The original spelling was the unaccented anhanga and the authentic pronunciation stressed the second syllable (paroxyton). Later, the accented form anhangá that stressed the last syllable (oxytone) came into frequent use in 17th century poetical works. (Note: Machado de Assis, in Americanas (1875), alerts to the fact that it follows the grammar prosody oxytone because it is commonly used in poetry, but that the true pronunciation of the word would be a paroxytone. [...] The original pronunciation seems to have been the paroxyton [anhanga], but anhangá begins to occur since the 17th century, being more used in poetry.)

== In Tupinambá culture ==
The Tupinambá people believed that Anhangá could take many different forms (cf. § Animal forms). Anhangá (Agnan) (Note: Thevet in some places styles the evil spirit as Agnan hypóuchy (var. Hipouchy Aignen, cf, quote). However, Acequeiey Aygan means "I fear the devil Anhanga" while Nacequeiey Aygan means "I do not fear the devil", according to Léry.) are believed to be the tormentors of dead souls. As much as he was a threat to the dead, he was an often-seen, ubiquitous and constant tormentor the living as well, who could also have their bodies and souls punished (beating them, etc. (Note: Thevet (1575), Livre XXI, Ch. VII, IV: 921: "Voys-tu pas Hipouchy Aignen (ainsi appellent-ils le maling esprit) qui me bat & tourmente: deffens moy, si tu veux que ie te serue, & que ie couppe du bois pour toy". Approximates the English translated quote: "Can't you see... Anhan who is beating and tormenting me? Defend me, if you wish me to serve you", cited as Thevet, p. 77. Similarly worded by Léry: "Aygnan, c'est à dire du malin esprit, lequel, cóuention genmei'ay dit ailleurs, les bat & tormente souuét: tile à nous soit qu'ils soyent par les bois à la chasse, ou sur incognue que le bord des eaux à la pescherie,... (Aygnan, that is to say the evil spirit, which, as I have said elsewhere, beats and torments them constantly, whether they are hunting in the woods, or at some unknown place, at the water's edge fishing,...)".)). The mere memory of the suffering inflicted by Anhangá was enough to torment them. The Tupinambás were said to fear this malignant spirit more than anything else.

This evil spirit would be one of the biggest concerns for those preparing the burial ritual, when it came the dead soul to journey to the Land Without Evils (aka Guajupiá (Note: This name "Guajupiá" for the paradise is solely attested by Claude d'Abbeville of the 17th century. Thus, even though Beauclair et al. (2009), p. 1413 interpolates "Guajupiá" in the claims, sources such as Thevet or Yves d'Evereux do not emply that name.)). Food offerings would be made alongside a fire to warm the body. Food was offered to sustain the dead as well as to ensure Anhangá would eat the food instead of the dead. The fire, meanwhile, had the goal of not only providing warmth, but also protection to the dead, as it would keep Anhangá away. The living would also encourage the dead already placed in their round dug-out burial pit (i.e. who had already reached Guajupiá) to not let their fires go out. It is emphasized that only souls of the most virtuous (those who had killed and eaten many enemies) ascend to the high mountain where lies this Elysium, whereas the souls of those who did not defend their realm wind up with Anhan, the tormenting devil.

The missionary André Thevet, writing in the 16th century, records that the natives, while traveling over water, believed that the noise of tempests or hurricanes they heard was caused by "the souls of relatives and friends", associated with the agnan. Thevet stated that reciting the Gospel of St. John had assuaged the natives' Agnan attack or episode, and he performed this recitation on a number of occasions.

The "red devil" (Portuguese: anhangapitã, Spanish: añangapitanga) has been regarded as synonymous with the carbuncle creature and the teiniaguá by some authorities, namely lexicographer Daniel Granada, and Augusto Meyer after him.

== In Mawé culture ==
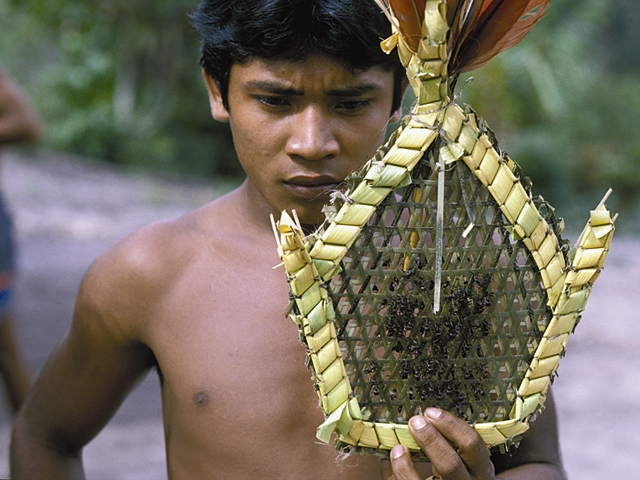
A young sataré-mawé with a rite of passage instrument.

To the Mawés, the Anhangá (Sateré-Mawé: ahiãg) is portrayed as a demon, a follower of Yurupari (Jurupari). These creatures are known and feared for being able to take various forms to fool people, curse, possess, kidnap, kill and eat them. Anhangá either can't swim or is afraid of entering the water out of fear for Sukuyu'wera, the water protecting spirit, his enemy.

== Protector of animals ==
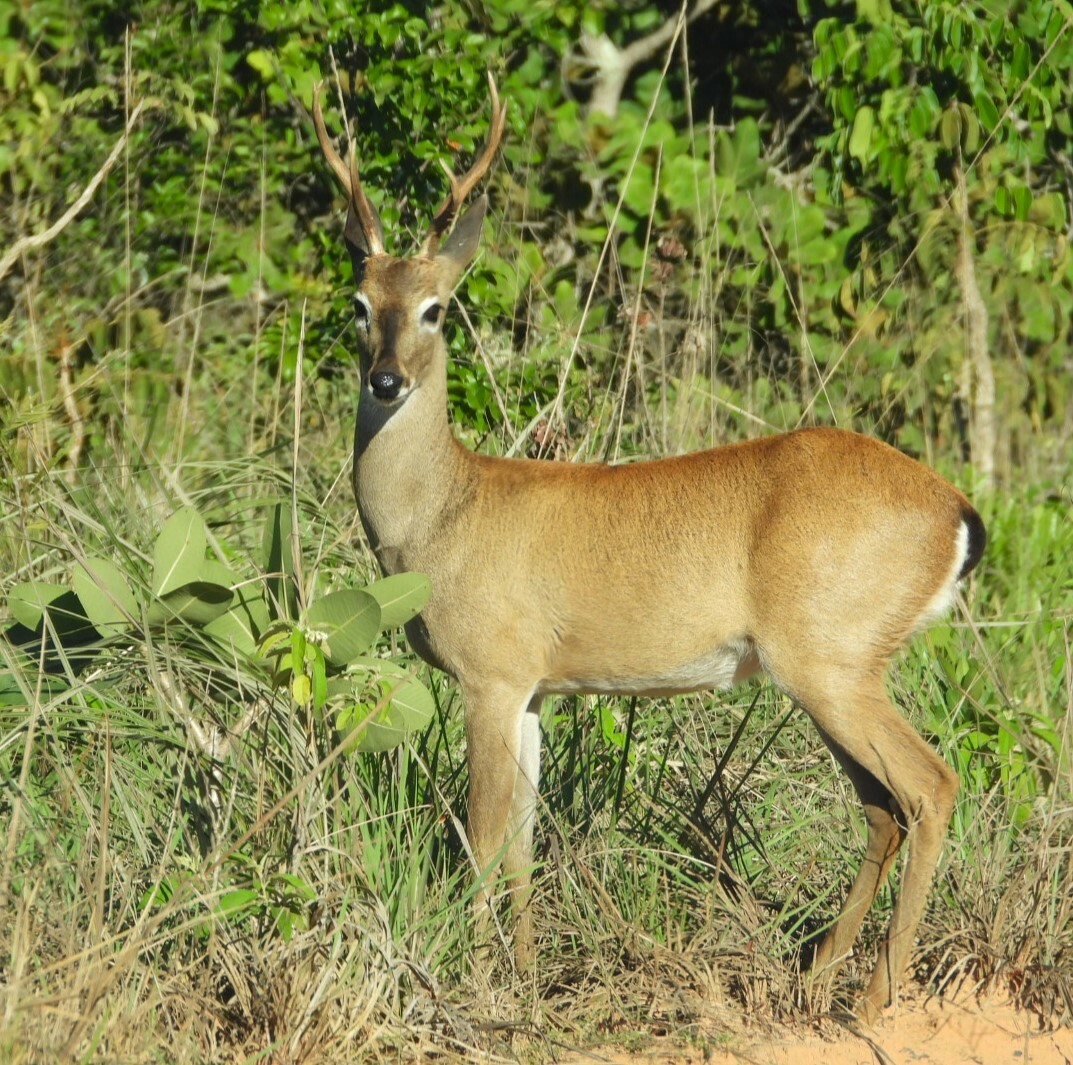
Pampas deer. Anhangá appears in the form of deer of white or red color.

As attested in 19th century writings (by Couto de Magalhães), Anhangá takes the form of a white deer with fiery eyes (Note: It is contended that the Tapajó people regarded a "white deer with fiery eyes" as one of the principal "deities", according to missionary Johann Philipp Bettendorff from the late 17c., and this is identifiable with the Anhangá.) and he is the protector of animals of the open fields (campo), guarding animals against abusive hunting practices in such terrain. Similar guardianship in the bush or forest (mato) is assumed by Cahipora/Cahapora (i.e. Caipora).

However, later commentary regards the Anhanga as the protector of forest animals, e.g. Ferreira's Aurélio Dictionary (1986), (Note: Ferreira (1986) Aurélio Dictionary, 2nd ed., s.v. Anhangá p.123 defines Anhangá as the protector of the animals of forest (floresta).) and likewise Simas's Brazilian bestiary (2024). And according to Antônio Houaiss Anhanga was a "genie of the forest and protector of the fauna and flora in Tupi mythology", who "neither devours nor kills. He avenges animals victimized by insatiable hunters".

According to tradition, the Anhanga will alter the outcome of a chase in the field, by inflicting "fever and sometimes madness" on a hunter who pursues a nursing animal (tr. "animal with young"). (Note: A somewhat altered and expanded version tells it as the "forest" hunters who prey on pregnant females and suckling young become the targets of Anhanga.)

Couto de Magalhães also supplied a legend from Santarém where a Tupinambá hunter pursued a doe and her suckling fawn. He grabbed the fawn, making it squeal to attract the mother and shot her. Or so he thought. In fact he had been confused by the Anhangá's illusions and had shot his own mother to death.

Câmara Cascudo discussed how the original deer myth as described by Magalhães had transformed in more modern periods:

The Anhanga is a myth of verbal confusion. The Anhanga that made the savage shake in fear was the Anga, the wandering soul, the phantom, the spirit of the dead. Terrifying. It was incorporeal. It was the evil-thing, the fear without form, convulsive, trapping the shy ones inside theirs ocas [indigenous houses] by the heat of the fire, surrounded by the dark night of the tropics. The Anhanga of with eyes of fire and the body of a deer is a numen, the protector of the species, totemic convention, the Tupi's regional superstition, for it hadn't been transmitted to other indigenous peoples and, through passing it to the ones of mixed-race, had lost his function as a patron of the field hunts. [....] it is logic to think that the initial myth, the ur-mythus, would be only Anga, the soul without a body, spreading fear.

== Animal forms ==
The description that the Anhanga may appear in the guise of humans or various mammals, fish, reptiles, or birds. Hence there are said to be such subtypes as the mira-anhanga (human-faced), tatu-anhanga (armadillo), suaçu-anhanga (deer), tapira-anhanga (ox), tapira-pirarucu (pirarucu fish), iurará-anhanga (turtle), nhambu-anhanga (inambu or tinamou bird), occurs in Cascudo's folklore dictionary (1s ed., 1954).

An alternate, somewhat detailed description is given by João Barbosa Rodrigues (d. 1909), whereby the incarnation of the Anhanga that appears before humans "is always in the form of a deer, red in color, with antlers covered in hair, with a fiery gaze, a cross on its forehead, known as Suessú anhanga.."

== Colonialism vs. Indianism ==
=== Missionary viewpoint ===
The Jesuit missionary José de Anchieta, in his auto Tupi-Medieval, gives the name Anhangupiara, "a word created from the agglutination of the nouns anhangá and jupiara", to an angel, whose meaning in the Latin translation of the Anchietan Tupi would be the enemy of the anhangás.

Another Jesuit, António Vieira, described "Añangá" in the Sermon on Incontinences (Unchastity), as a duplicitous entity worshiped by the indigenous folk.

In more modern times, Neo-Pentecostal churches with a strong presence in the Mawé communities reinterpret Anhangá as an announcement of evil and a demonic manifestation, to be fought by prayers and chants.

=== In literary context ===
Anhangá is present in the Indianist works of Brazilian novelist Gonçalves Dias. In the poems "O Canto do Piaga (Song of the shaman)" and "Deprecação (Deprecation)" from his 1846 anthology, Anhangá is characterized as a cruel and merciless entity, allied with the colonizers.

In Santa Rita Durão's "Caramuru" (1781), the author presents Anhangá or Anhangás taking the roles of demons, as well as presenting Tupã taking a creator role in the creation of a colonialist myth paralleled to the Biblical Creation Myth.

In similar vein, the bandeirante Bartolomeu Bueno da Silva, earned the nickname Anhangüera (with the sense of "Old Devil" or "Consummate Devil"), stemming from Anhangá.

== See also ==
- Guarani mythology
- Tupi people
- Animism
- Caipora
- Curupira

== Bibliography ==
- Barbosa Rodrigues, João (1890). Poranduba amazonense: ou, Kochiyma-uara porandub, 1872-1887. Rio de Janeiro: Typ. de G. Leuzinger & Filhos.
- Beauclair, Mariana; Scheel-Ybert, Rita; Bianchini, Gina Faraco; Buarque, Angela (July 2009). "Fire and ritual: bark hearths in South-American Tupiguarani mortuary rites". Journal of Archaeological Science. 36 (7): 1409–1415. doi:10.1016/j.jas.2009.02.003. ISSN 0305-4403.; Article in Press edition: pages 1–7 (pdf)
- Botelho, João Bosco; Weigel, Valéria Augusta C. M. (September 2011). "Comunidade sateré-mawé Y'Apyrehyt: ritual e saúde na pe riferia urbana de Manaus" [The Sateré-Mawé community of Y’Apyrehyt: ritual and health on the urban outskirts of Manaus]. História, Ciências, Saúde-Manguinhos (in Portuguese). 18 (3): 723–744. doi:10.1590/S0104-59702011000300007. ISSN 0104-5970. PMID 22012094.;
  - English translation by David Allan Rodgers.
- Cascudo, Luís da Câmara (1962) [1954]. Dicionário do folclore brasileiro (in Portuguese) (2 ed.). Rio de Janeiro: Instituto Nacional do Livro.
- Cascudo, Luís da Câmara (1998) [1954]. Dicionário do folclore brasileiro (in Portuguese) (9 ed.). Rio de Janeiro: Ediouro. OCLC 468775218.
- Houaiss, Antônio; Villar, Mauro; Franco, Francisco Manoel de Mello (2001). Dicionário Houaiss da língua portuguesa (in Portuguese). Objetiva. OCLC 260092175.
- Léry, Jean de (1580) [1578]. Histoire d'vn voyage faict en la terre du Bresil, autrement dite Amerique... La Rochelle: pour Antoine Chuppin.
  - Facsimile edition (1975). Notes par Jean-Claude Morisot, index des notions ethnologiques par Louis Necker
- La Popelinière, Lancelot Voisin de (1997) [1582]. Beaulieu, Anne-Marie (ed.). Les trois mondes. Travaux d'humanisme et Renaissance 310. Librairie Droz. ISSN 0082-6081.
- Magalhães, José Vieira Couto de (1876). O selvagem. Vol. II: Origens, costumes e Região Selvagem. Rio de Janeiro: Typogr. da reforma.
- Sousa, Gabriel Soares de (1587). Notícia do Brasil (in Portuguese).
- Sousa, Gabriel Soares de (1938). Tratado descriptivo do Brazil em 1587 (in Portuguese). São Paulo: Companhia Nacional.
- Southey, Robert (1810). History of Brazil. Vol. 1. Longman, Hurst, Rees, and Orme.
- Thevet, André (1575). La cosmographie universelle d'André Thevet, cosmographe du roy: illustrée de diverses figures des chose plus remarquables veues par l'auteur, & incogneuës de noz anciens & modernes. Chez Guillaume Chandiere. OCLC 243563097.
  - Thevet, André (1986). André Thevet's North America: A Sixteenth-Century View. Translated by Schlesinger, Roger; Stabler, Arthur Phillips. McGill-Queen's Press - MQUP. ISBN 9780773505872.
- Tupiniquim Ramos, Ricardo (2018). "Religião e cosmologia Tupis". In de Oliveira Leite, Gildeci; Tupiniquim Ramos, Ricardo (eds.). Leitura de letras e cultura (PDF). Vol. 1. pp. 59–61. Archived from the original (PDF) on 2021-08-26.
