= Curupira =

Mythological creature in Tupi–Guarani folklore

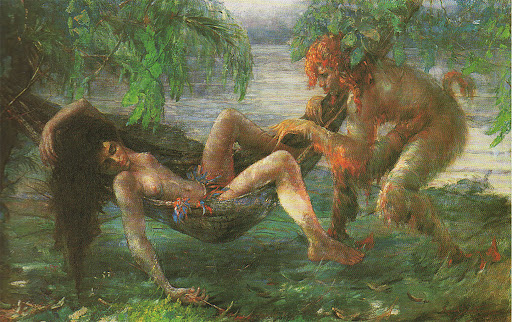
O Curupira by Manoel Santiago, 1926

The Curupira, Currupira or Korupira (Portuguese pronunciation: [kuɾuˈpiɾɐ]) is a forest spirit in the myth of the Tupí-Guaraní speaking areas in the Brazil, Paraguay and Guyanas. It is a guardian of the forests that punishes humans for overcutting.

It looks like a backwards-footed, short-statured tapuio or caboclo (civilized indigene or one of mixed race), or like a bald but otherwise shaggy man (though the women have flowing hair). Some say it has blue or green teeth. The red-haired image has become fixture, perhaps due to conflation with the caipora.

The Curupira according to early Jesuits in São Paulo was a feared being known to leave gruesomely scarred bodies, to be appeased by offerings. But it underwent a mutation via European influence, and was recast into more of a mischievous trickster type spirit, often bungling and letting humans outsmart it, though it could still cause misfortune and death.

== Origins ==
The first attested mention of Curupira was in May 30th, 1560 in São Vicente, São Paulo, Brazil by Joseph of Anchieta. The legend also appears in Venezuela, Guyana, Peru and Paraguay, and could have been passed from Karaib-speakers to Guarani-speaking populace.

== Nomenclature ==
The lore of the Curupira is not only found in Brazil, but also in Paraguay and Guiana coinciding with the distribution of the Tupi–Guarani languages.

The name Curupira means "covered in wounds or blisters", and derives from an agglutination of Nheengatu: kuru "grain, rough", etc. and piré "skin" (cog. Guarani/Tupi: pí), thus "rough or pimply skin". This kurupire may have been passed on perhaps from Nheengatu-speakers in Brazil to the Tupinambá speakers, then to the Guaraní-speaking population in the south.

The name is normally styled "Curupira" (in Pará) and spelt "Currupira" in the south. It is also argued that curupira goes by other names depending on region, namely Çacy tapereré (Saci Pererê) in the south, Caipora in the central region ), and Maty-taperé in the North. (Note: Barbosa Rodrigues contends "tapere" is truer to original than "perere", but Cascudo amends to "Saci Pererê".) Sometimes transcribed "Korupira". (Note: By Carlos Teschauer)

Some commentators have argued the Curupira and Caipora to be the same, others say they are different. The usage is regional, for example, from Maranhão south to Espírito Santo, its persistent nickname is Caipora (cf. § Conflation with Caipora).

== Legend ==
The Curupira is a "hominoid spirit" or god, perhaps a "wild man", (Note: "Curupíra, the wild man or spirit of the forest" Some told as bedtime stories "myths about the Curupíra, and other demons or spirits of the forest", p. 85) considered the guardian of the forest. It punishes humans who wantonly harvest lumber by making him lose his way, wander timelessly in the forest, so he becomes unable to reach his home.

The Curupira is described as a small-statured tapuio ("brown man" (Note: The term tapuio signifies one from a "non-Tupi" tribe, or native who has become civilized and do not follow traditional modes of living.)), or a "caboclinho" (diminutive of caboclo), of similar meaning.

Notably, the Curupira has his feet turned backwards, (Note: "Portuguese: pés voltados para traz(trás)".) to mislead trackers with footprints proceeding in the opposite direction, so that one trying to flee the Curupira actually pursues it. (Note: Bates, also cited by Cascudo.) (Note: While "some say his feet are double; some that he has but one rounded hoof".)

The Curupira allegedly has family, a wife and children living in the hollow of dead trees. The women have long hair. (Note: But "in Nogueira and Tefé they say that Korupira has beautiful hair, just one eyebrow in the middle of the forehead and breasts are under the arms") Sometimes they trespass upon a human roça (crop field) to steal the mandioca (manioc). Or else it is said that the wife is some old, ugly evil tapuya woman who plays accomplice to his misdeeds, and among their children, the youngest is the Saci (Note: Or else the youngest "Benjamin" is the "Korupira pitanga" or "mitanga".) Note that Caipora (Kaapora) has been discussed as a variant of Curupira, and its wife is identified as Tatácy (in Amazonas) and Tatámanha (in Pará). (Note: And Tatámanha has been stated as Saci's mother. cf. Saci article.)

Curupira was blamed for causing bad thoughts and nightmares. It is also said to have been a "mischievous wood-sprite" (Note: German: neckischer Waldgeist) that engages in conversation with humans, foments distrust and dissent among individuals, and enjoy watching them fall into misfortune, but this description, taken to mean a "comical spirit" has been viewed unfavorably. The Curupira is attested as being regarded as a "god of thinking" or of "lies and deception" (Note: De Laet, Marcgravius: "nuomen mentis".) (cf. § History for further details), which may have to do with it being seen as playing with one's mind in general.

The Curupira is fond of tobacco, and rewards hunters for offering it, but they must keep it secret from their wives. Besides tobacco it loves cachaça (sugarcane booze), (Note: Casucudo in one piece of writing describes the female Caipora with the flowing hair is crazy over "fumo e cachaça" and talks about the male Caipora. Elsewhere, he quotes from Graça Aranha's novel Canaã (1902) 3rd ed. p. 102, where a man suspects the currupira for his debilitation in the forest. He tries to retrieve his tobacco and bottle restilo (sugarcane Vinasse) for a chew and swig, but finds them missing; he remembers the warning from his old uncle to give the "cachaça e fumo" straightaway to the currupira in order to get rid of it.) and hunters are known to offer these as propitiation to the Curupira.

Curupira can also be regarded as a rider of a deer, rabbit, or pig, or a peccary, variously given to be a white-lipped peccary (Tayassu pecari) or a collared peccary (T. tajacu (Note: Portuguese: "O curupira... em algumas vezes, montado em um caititu (Tayassu tajacu)".) ; cf. § Conflation with Caipora). In the lore of the state of Pernambuco, the Curupira or Korupira (though the sources consider these a variant of the caipora/caapora) rides a deer, and is accompanied by his dog named “Papa-mel".

=== Physical description ===
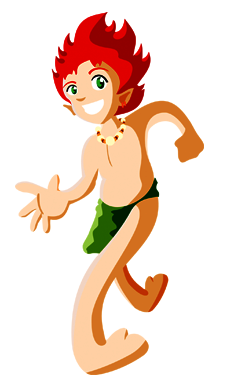
Digital art representation of the curupira, 2006

The physical appearance is described variously. He is said to have enormous ears and blue or green teeth (in the Solimões River basin). It is also said to be balding or bald-headed (Tupinambá: piroka (Note: Portuguese: "calvo ou de cabeça pellada".)) but hairy-bodied with long body hair (in the Rio Negro basin). Naturalist Bates remarked that it was like an orangutan with shaggy hair, living in trees, so that in later commentary the curupira was generally attributed with red/orange hair. (Note: Portuguese: "cabelo vermelho".) Others have said it has a bright red face and cloven feet. Other regions held that it was one-eyed (Rio Tapajós basin), or that it has no anus hence becomes solidly or massively built (according to Pará lore). (Note: Portuguese: mussiço equiv. massiço, maciço.) (Note: The regional identifications by river system are from Barbosa Rodrigues (1890), p. 6)

==== Conflation with Caipora ====
While Bates considered the Curupira and Caipora as distinguishable, they were considered to be the same by German naturalist Martius.

Long red body hair seems to have been ascribed originally to the Caipora, said to be similar to Curupira. The Caipora is said to ride a collared peccary (taitetú), and the Curupira has come to be commonly portrayed riding one also.

=== Sounds and smell ===
The Curupira also confuses travelers in the woods by producing high pitched whistling sound mimicking the call of the tinamou (inambú) bird.

The Curupira allegedly beats on the projecting root of the tree (sapopema, i.e., buttress root) to diagnose if it remains sturdy enough to resist storms. Thus when paddlers traveling by canoe in the rivers of Pará hear beating noises in the forest, they will say it is the sound of Curupira performing that chore. (Note: And while penetrating the Pará rainforest, Bate's group would hear "a sound.. like the clang of an iron bar against a hard, hollow tree, or a piercing cry rends the air", followed by dead silence, which the locals attributed to the Curupira)

According to the fieldwork of Charles Wagley conducted in the 1950s, the Curupira was known not only to make "long shrill cries" from the depths of the forest, but could mimic human voices to lure rubber tappers or hunters and lead them astray. In an old anecdote of an actual encounter, the child-sized curupira was strong enough to throw the man up in the air and break his legs. The man took out holy wax from his pouch, causing the creature to come no closer, but it had such catinga (bad odor) about him it rendered the hunter unconscious. (Note: The "Itá" community is alias for Gurupá, Pará, but the local creek "lgarapé Arinoá" was edged by an impenetrable forest called "place of the curupiras". The encounter was by a newcomer to the community, known to the grandfather of the informant hunter "old Enéas Ramos" (p. 76).)

Supposedly the Curupira sings a certain enchanting song that attracts humans, and the lyrics literally mean "I'm walking along my path, behind me come walking, walking".

=== Protection ===
To counter against the Curupira's effect of losing one's way, the traveler must fashion a cross or a wheel made of liana vine (Portuguese: cipó), and while the spirit is engaged trying to unravel it, the traveler gains opportunity to escape. The naturalist Bates also records that the mameluco youth who frequently accompanied him refused to proceed without hanging a charm made of palm-leaf formed into a wheel, in order to ward against the curupira.

== Narratives ==
Herbert Huntington Smith (1879) records a story (Note: collected from informant Maria dos Reis of Santarém.) where a Curupira kills a native hunter and brings back the heart to the man's wife and child to eat. The wife realizes the deception at night and flees with the child. She is helped by a frog that spits a gummy substance, which lifts her up to a tree. The Curupira gets stuck on the frog's sticky goo trying to climb, and dies.

Another story was given by Charles Frederick Hartt tells of a hunter who was asked to hand over his heart, but outwits the Curupira. The man passes off a monkey heart as his own, persuading Curupira to carve out its own heart, thus committing his own murder. Hartt compared it to the Norwegian folktale "About Askeladden who Stole from the Troll" ("Boots and the Troll"). The hunter later goes to collect the green teeth of the Curupira, and discovers it has revived, giving him a magic bow, but sworn to secrecy. The inquisitive of his wife loosens his tongue and the hunter dies. In a variant version, the hunter breaks the taboo against using the magic bow to hunt birds, and is pecked to death by a flock. The hunter is mended by the Curupira using wax to replace his flesh, but the warning not to eat hot foods thereafter goes unheeded by the hunter, who melts away due to the heat intake. (Note: This tale type is catalogued under #442. "The Hunter and the Curupira" ed. Juan Carlos Galeano, Folktales of the Amazon, a version localized in the Içá River. This is a resource of English-translated tales. Variants given.)

== History ==
The oldest mention of his name is by the Jesuit José de Anchieta, in São Vicente, on 30 May 1560:

"It's a well-known thing and it's rumored by everyone that there are certain demons, which the Brazilians call corupira, that often attack Indians in the bush, wound them with the whip, tormenting and killing them. Our Brothers are witnesses of this, having seen [the dead] killed by them. Therefore, the Indians [in order to appease the demons] traverse the path through the sertão hinterlands, full of rough woodland and steep hills, to reach the highest mountain, leaving bird feathers, fans, arrows and such things [as a kind of oblation], begging [the demons] to do them no harm".

Other early mentions were made by Jesuit Fernão Cardim (1584), and by the Dutchman Johannes de Laet (director of Dutch West India Company, in 1640)

Acuña (1641) is mentioned as an earlier testimony, but he writes on the Mutayu tribe, reputed to have feet facing backwards, known to be a great craftsmen of stone axes, whom Acuña said were a subbranch of the Tupinambá. However, Sérgio Buarque de Holanda (Caminhos e Fronteiras 1957) argued the "fabulous Mutayu" and the Curupira myth to be a product derived from the rainforest people's tactical practice of wearing shoes to throw enemies off their path.

=== Corruption to picaresque deity ===
Cardim records that Curupira is the devil the indigenous people revere and fear above all else, but do not craft any idols of them. De Laet's mentions it, and together with his collaborator Marcgravius (Georg Marcgrave) wrote in Latin that the names for the Devil among the populace was "Anhanga, Jurupari, Curupari [sic]", of which the Curupira was called a nuomen mentis, perhaps meaning "spirit of thoughts" as glossed by Father Simão de Vasconcelos (1663). (Note: Portuguese: "espirito dos pensamentos") But this Latin can also be construed as meaning the deity of “lies” and “deceptions” according to Gonçalves Dias (1867). Cascudo does not appear to warm to that interpretation, and writes that Father João Daniel (1797) would have disagreed. João Daniel had described a deity that shouted out loud demanding offerings, and the populace got straightforwardly "beaten" for being derelict in their propitiation obligations.

As the "god of thoughts" (or "god of lies" perhaps), Curupira had been treated as a venerated part of the pantheon, but later got corrupted to a sort of "imp or buffoon" according to Daniel Garrison Brinton. Compare mythographer Hartley Burr Alexander who characterized Curupira as less Satan and more Pan-like.

Martius's characterization as "mischievous wood-sprite", which were taken to mean a "comical spirit" has been cited by other scholars, but they may have taken exception to this view. (Note: "esprito comico") Martius's point that Curupira as less sinister than the Jurupari seems lost to them.

Also, there used to be compartmentalization of the different gods' duties where Anhanga protected large game, Caipora/Caapora small game, and the Mboitatá the grasses and shrubbery. But this divide broke down, and Curupira later came to be regarded as the unchallenged ruler over not just the forestry but all the wonders in it, according to the analysis of Cascudo.

=== Urbane view ===
Eduardo Galvão (1955) informs: "Currupira is a genius of the forest. In the city or in the capoeiras in its immediate neighborhood there are no currupiras. They live further away, far inside the forest. The people of the city believe in their existence, but they are not a reason for concern because currupiras don't like heavily populated places". (Note: Galvão, Eduardo Enéas (1955) Santos e visagens: um estudo da vida religiosa de Itá, Amazonas, p. 99 apud Cascudo (1967).)

== Parallels ==
Mapinguari has been paralleled with the Pokái in the tradition of Macushi (Note: given as "Makuchys".) who inhabit the forests in the mountain chains of Roraimá state, is an identical myth. The Pokái is "a small, long-haired country urchin with a long nose, with feet turned backwards, lame in one leg, and using the heel of his foot to hit the drums". The lore about the Iuoroko or Iuoroco among the Pariqui (Note: Given as "Parikys" by Barbosa Rodrigues.) people of Jatapu River may also be the same myth.

Other counterparts are the Máguare of In Venezuela; the Selvage of Columbia, the Incan Chudiachaque of Peru, and the Kauá of Kokamas of Bolivia.

The Curupira has also been paralleled with Rübezahl the alpine god of the Sudeten Mountains.

=== Cognate tales or motifs ===
Charles Frederick Hartt named three foreign mythical beings comparable to the curupira: Norwegian troll as aforementioned, the Russian leshy, and the Algonquian "Manabozho/Manobozho" (cog. Ojibwa: Nanabozho).

In one narrative, Manabozho watches the moose man magically extract a large piece of meat from his own wife (but heals her afterwards using meeta or 'magical cure'); Manabozho then tries to imitate this on his own wife, nearly killing her. This parallels the motif in the narrative (cf. above) where the hunter tricks the curupira into carving out his own heart.

A Russian Fairy Tales story collected by Afanasyev, about the fox that tricks the bear into smashing its own forehead and eating the contents, also exhibits the same motif. The Russian leshy ("lyeshy") with green hair and green teeth is only superficially similar to the Curupira.

== Modern commemorations ==
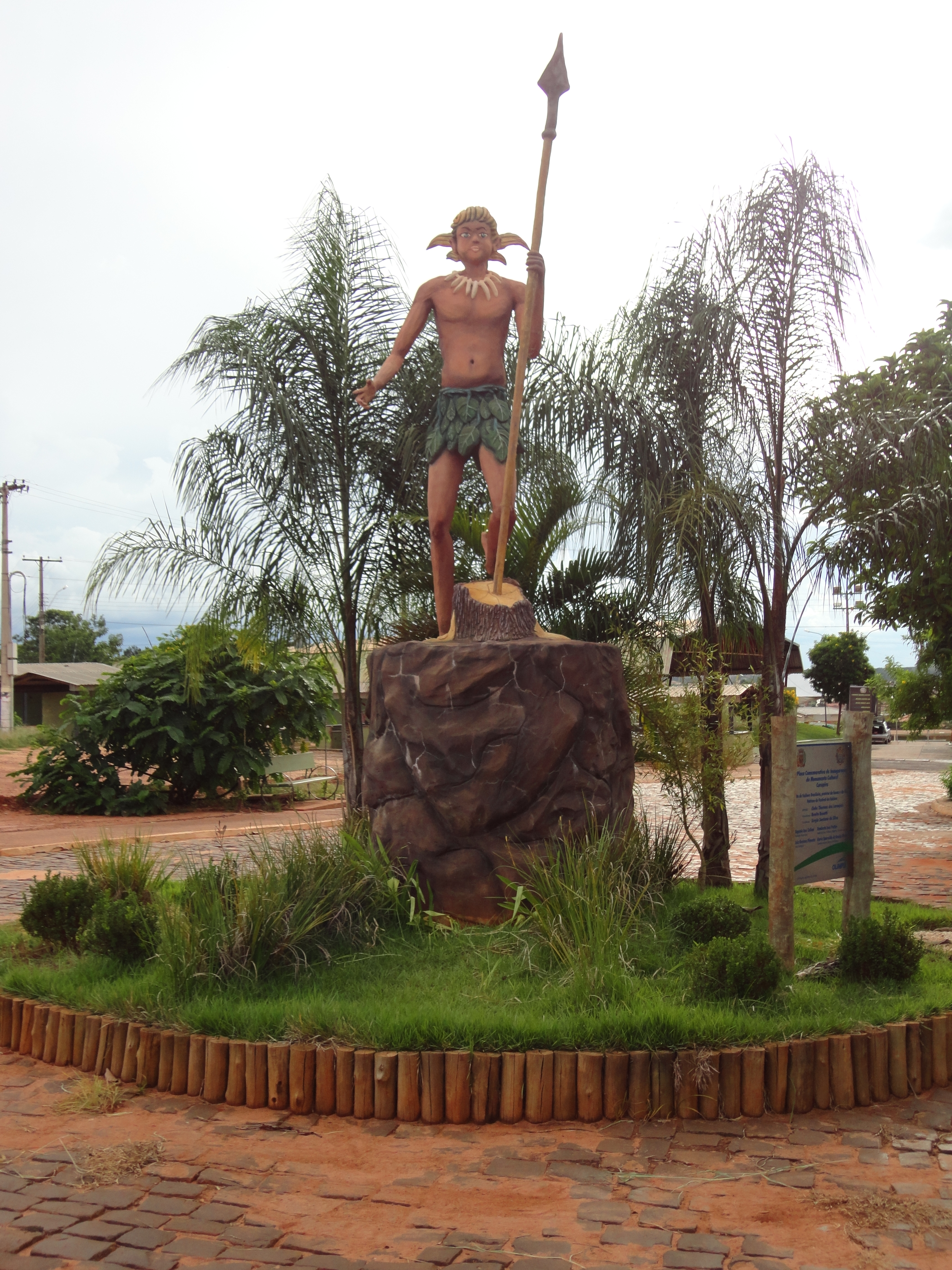
A curupira statue in Olímpia, São Paulo

The State of São Paulo, as decreed by law of September 11, 1970, signed by governor Roberto Costa de Abreu Sodré, "establishes the Curupira as the state symbol of the guardian of the forests and the animals that live in them". On Arbor Day, September 21 of that year, a statue monument of Curupira was placed in what was then Horto Florestal (now Albert Löfgren State Park), in the state capital São Paulo. The statuette was vandalized and removed to museum, but a new version was commissioned from Thirso Cruz, and the replacement restored to the park. Cruz had originally created the (since stolen) Curupira statue that stood in Fábio Barreto municipal forest, Ribeirão Preto, based on which the original Horto statue got created.

In the municipality of Olímpia, in that state, for over thirty consecutive years, no official documents are signed during the week in which the Folklore Festival takes place, in the month of August, a period in which the municipal authority is represented by Curupira, which exercises its power by protecting the local population and visitors who come there, birds, forests, etc.

The Fundaçao Brasileira para Conservação da Natureza (FBCN) has adopted the curupira as its official symbol in 1958.

== In popular culture ==
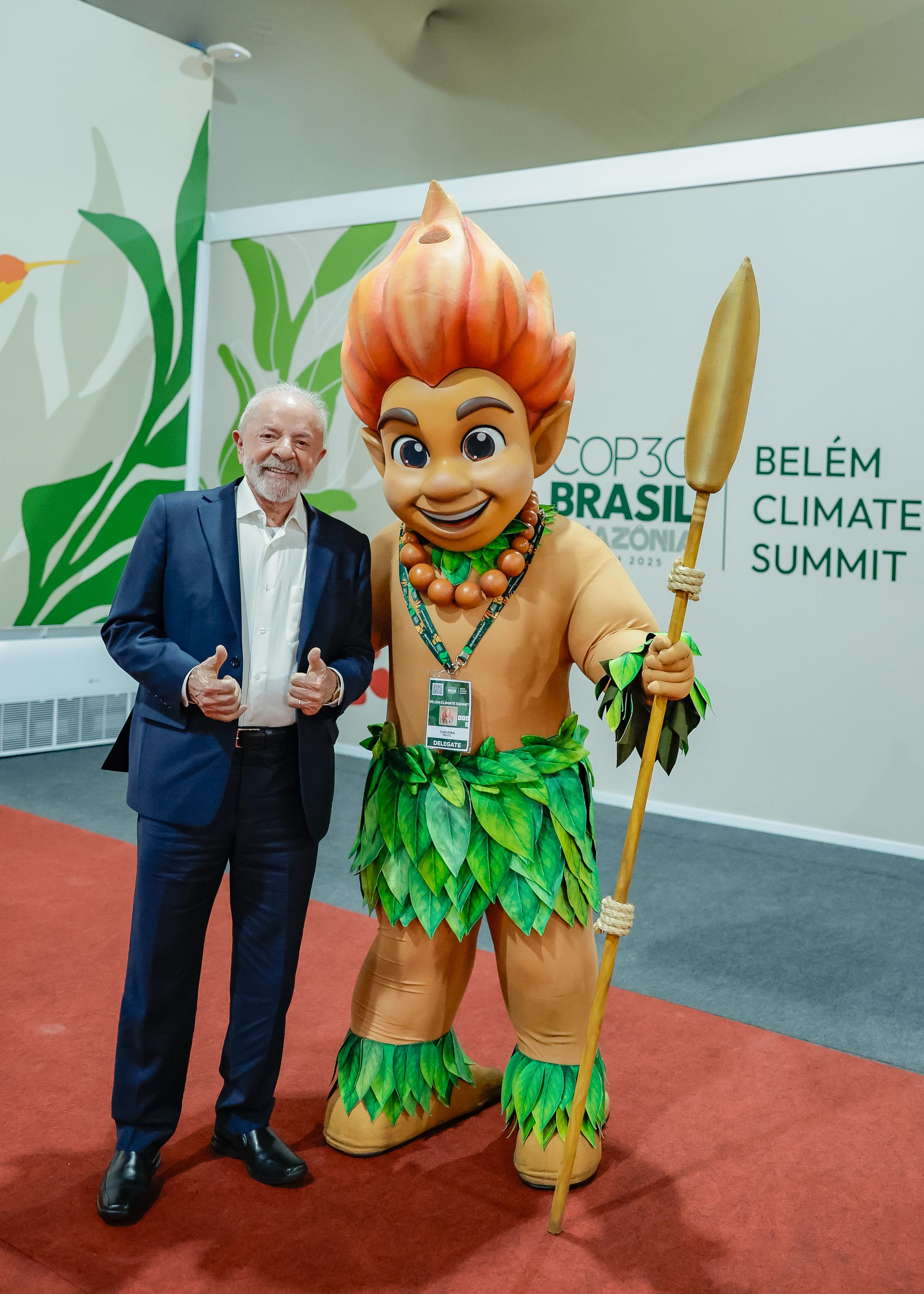
Curupira and Luiz Inácio Lula da Silva

A being called the Demon Curupira was featured in several episodes of the 1999–2002 television series Beastmaster. Played by Australian actress Emilie de Ravin, this Curupira, while still possessing the backwards feet, had the appearance of a young and deceptively sweet-faced blonde girl clad in green. She was a spirit of the forest and very capricious; she protected the animals, particularly tigers, and with a kiss she could drain humans of their lives, reducing their bodies to mere husks. She was an uneasy ally of the title character, Dar.

In the 2020 animated film The Red Scroll, the character Idril is inspired by Curupira, although she does not have backwards feet, she clearly demonstrates the ability to leave inverted footprints on the ground in one of the scenes.

The 2021 Netflix series Invisible City features numerous characters of Brazilian lore, including Curupira. Curupira, played by Fabio Lago, is portrayed as a homeless person who is actually an entity that guards and protects Brazilian forests, perceived by his backward feet, flaming head, and illusion-like high whistles that combine nature and human voices.

== See also ==
- Caipora – Entity in Brazil mythology
- Cipitio – Salvadoran folkloric character
- Headless Mule – Paranormal entity from Brazilian folklore
- Leshy – Forest spirit in Slavic mythology
- Mapinguari – Legendary cryptid in the Amazon
- Matinta-Pereira - Werewolf, often she-wolf of the Amazon
- Mohan (legendary) – Mythological figures in South and Central American folklore
- Tapire-iauara – Amazonian Cryptid, also ascribed catinga or dizzying stench
- Uaica – Karajá and Apinayé mythological character Note Uaicás is a real existing tribe.
