= Claude de Razilly =

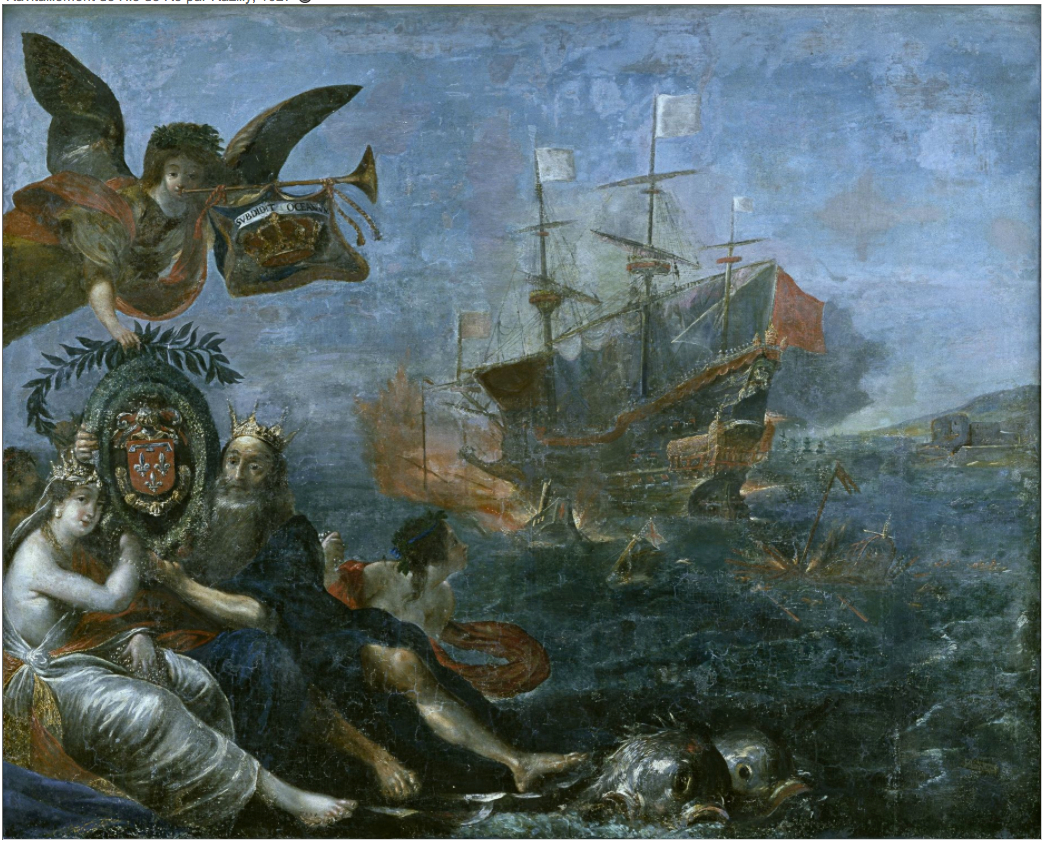
Successful resupply of Ile de Ré by Claude de Razilly in 1627, painted by Claude Vignon (1642). He is depicted in the guise of Neptune, with his wife Perrine Gaultier, in the bottom left corner.

Claude de Razilly, also Claude de Launay-Razilly (1593-1654). was a French Navy officer. He was the brother of François de Razilly and Isaac de Razilly.

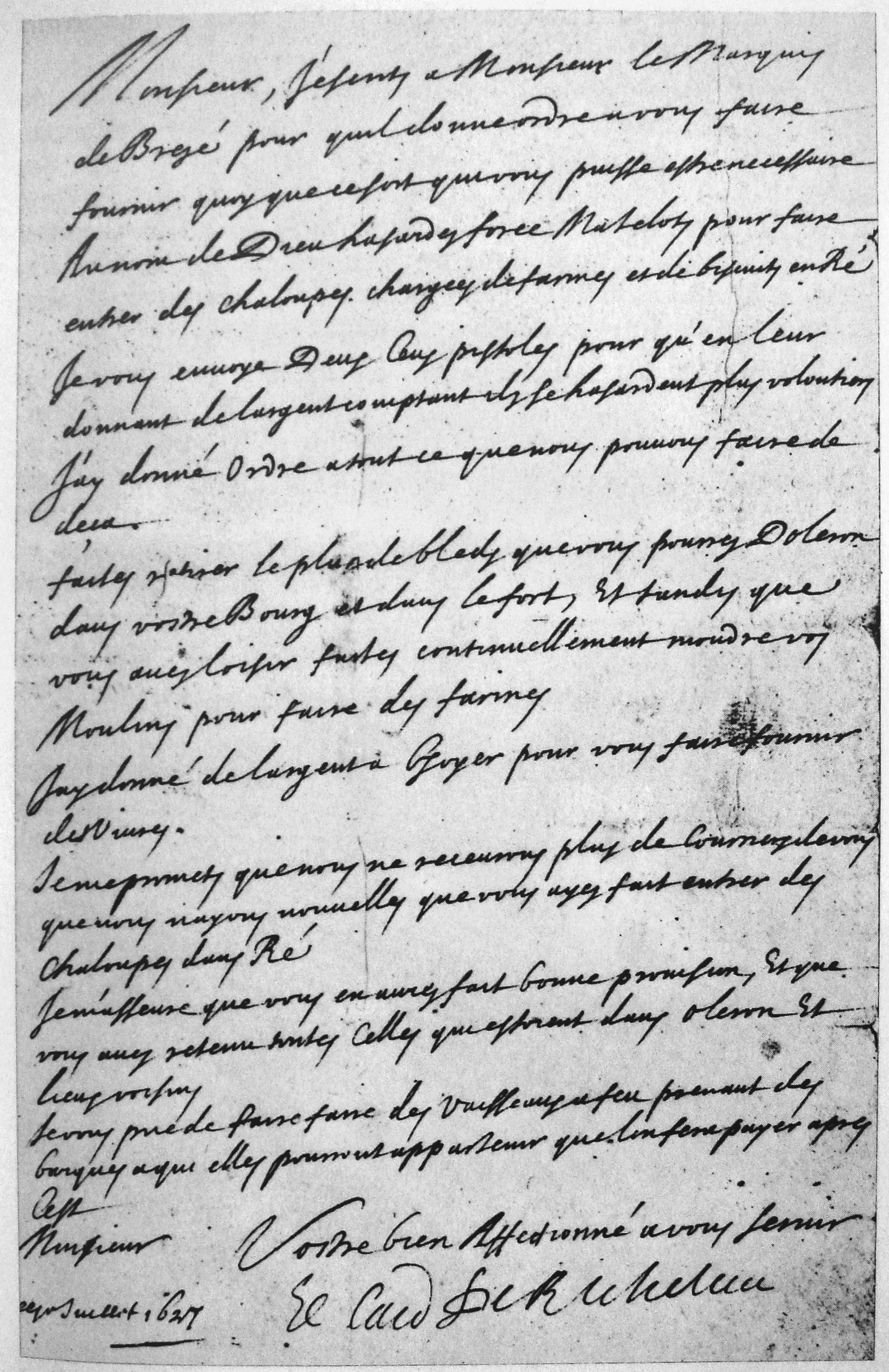
Letter of Cardinal Richelieu to Claude de Razilly exhorting him to do everything in his power to relieve Ré Island, July 1627.

Claude de Razilly fought in the Siege of Saint-Martin-de-Ré (1627) in 1627 and the Siege of La Rochelle. In 1627, he successfully relieved the siege of the Royal forces in the fortress of Saint-Martin-de-Ré by sailing through an important English naval blockade.

In 1632, he was given by Richelieu in association with his brother Isaac de Razilly a mission to recover Acadia from the English following the Treaty of Saint-Germain. He was Governor of Acadia when Port Royal was recovered in 1634.

Three years later, Claude de Razilly was succeeded as Acadian Governor by two contenders, Charles de Menou d'Aulnay and Charles de Saint-Étienne de la Tour.

In 1638, Claude de Razilly fought in the Battle of Guetaria.
