= Cabeça de Cuia =

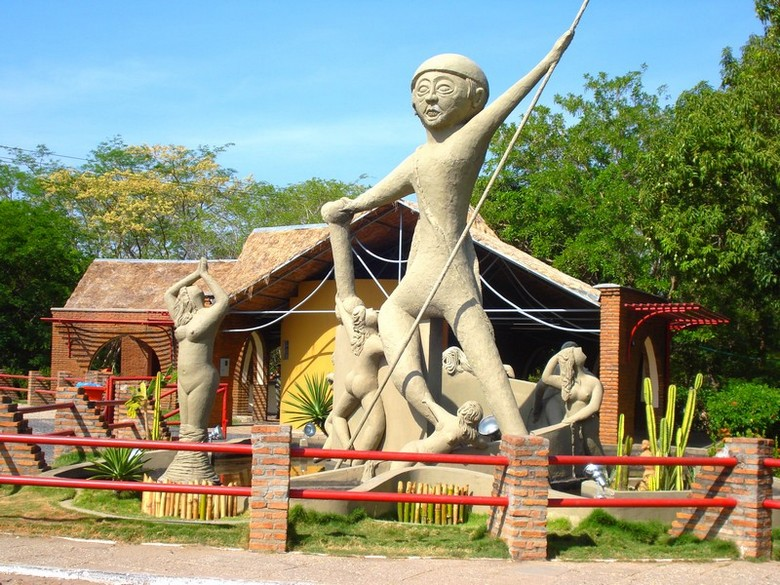
Monument representing Cabeça de Cuia devouring the seven virgins named Mary. ―Parque Ambiental Encontro dos Rios, in the Poti Velho bairro of Teresina, Piauí.

Cabeça de Cuia ("gourd-head") is a legendary creature in the folklore of the Northeast Region of Brazil, more specifically the state of Piauí, along the Paranaíba River basin.

== Nomenclature ==
There is a lexical play on words in the name Cabeça de Cuia ("gourd head") since cabaça, another word for "gourd", sounds very much like cabeça for "head".

== General description ==
According to legend, the Paranaíba creature was originally a human being (before the founding of the new state capital of Teresina), a fisherman by profession (and Crispim by name) Crispim returned one day frustrated, having caught no fish, and when a beef-bone soup (or chambaril, the ox-shank stew which is the local specialty dish of Piauí) is served that day, he was angered by the meagerness of the meal, and threw a large bone at his mother (or beat her with a large bone called corredor de boi "bull's runner", and as she lay dying) she laid a curse on her son that would turn him into a river monster with a gourd-head (or "Bowl Head"). The curse would only be lifted when he has devoured seven virgins all named Maria.

According to several authorities, the Cabeça de Cuia must devour one virgin Maria every seven years, and after consuming the last one, he reverts to his old ordinary masculine human form. (Note: Michaelis dictionary, s.v. "cabeça: Cabeça de cuia") Thus after a span of forty-nine years, he is supposed to have lifted his curse. But others say he has never accomplished this task, neither having killed any virgin Mary nor anyone. He is still claimed to be spotted by locals, to this day. He is said to wander aimlessly from the waters of Parnaíba to the Poti River and neighboring areas, especially during the flood season.

He presents a general threat to bathers or waders in the Parnaíba River, pursuing and attempting to drown them. The tall, thin creature with long hair hanging down his face will sometimes devour bathing children, (Note: Freitas, João Alfredo de (1884) Superstições e lendas do Norte do Brasil apud Basílio de Magalhães: "é alto, magro, de grande cabelo, que lhe cai pela testa, e, quando nada, o sacode".) so that the name of "Cabeça de cuia" by mothers who want to frighten her children to keep off the waters. But even grown men exercise caution in wading during the flooding season, when the creature becomes active in hunting victims. Or else he capsizes boats and kills canoeists.

== Dating ==
The legend is closely tied with the circumstances of founding of the city of "New Poti Velho" (Teresina) and the relegation of the old town as the city's bairro. Maria do Socorro Rios Magalhães guesses that the legend must have emerged in the early 19th century, when Poti Velho first began to be discussed as the ideal site for the new state capital.

One early documented attestations is found in João Alfredo de Freitas's Superstições e lendas do Norte do Brasil (1884), where the cabeça-de-cúia is described as "tall, thin, with long hair falling over his forehead, which he shakes when he swims".

== Parallels ==
A version of the legend is known in the state of Maranhão as well.

Cabeça de Cuia is a "fluvial myth, originating in the legend of a bad son (filho mau), cursed by his mother during a moment of anger, when she had good reason to do so", according to Basílio de Magalhães.

Also, the myth of the corpo seco ("withered corpse") circulating in the state of São Paulo is seen as a parallel.

Other legendary creatures of Piauí are also mentioned alongside, such as the barba ruiva ("red beard"), which is "a myth of the shellfish variety, originating in an infanticide". (Note: b. Magalhães names four beings of importance from Piauí, the others being pé de garrafa ("bottle foot") and carneiro de ouro ("golden sheep").)

== Literary and media adaptations ==
After being handed down by oral tradition, the legend has been adapted into innumerable versions, also including plays, poetry, and popular songs.

Many of these are collected in the comprehensive study by Josias Clarence Carneiro da Silva (1929–1992), entitled Encanto e terror das águas piauienses (1982).

There is the song "Cabeça de Cuia, lenda piauiense" (1956) by choro singer João de Deus, another song "Cabeça-de-Cuia", with lyrics starting "Sete Marias / Precisa tragar.." attributed to piauiense poet Chico Bento.

The creature is alluded to by Clóvis Moura in his novel Argila da Memória (1982).

A series of graphic novels (Lenda de Crispim, in three volumes, 2013–2019) based on the creature, by Eduardo Prazeres.

== Commemorations ==
In the year 2003, the city of Teresina established Cabeça de Cuia Day (“Dia do Cabeça-de-de-Cuia”), to be celebrated on the last Friday of April.

On 3 October 2023, the Legislative Assembly of Piauí (Alepi) approved the bill recognizing the legend of Cabeça de Cuia as Intangible Cultural Heritage of Piauí.

== See also ==
- kappa (folklore) - Japanese water demon sometimes associated with gourd or calabash, though better known for liking cucumbers
- Romãozinho - myth of a black boy who hit his mother and was condemned to roam the wilderness
