= Pé de garrafa =

Brazilian legendary creature called bottle-foot

Pé de garrafa or pé-de-garrafa (literally "bottle foot") is a legendary creature from Brazilian folklore, so-called because it has a rounded foot or feet like the bottom of a bottle, which leaves strange round footprints.

== Legend ==
The Pé de garrafa is said to leave a trail of deep, round foot tracks as it has solid and rounded stumps for feet, like the bottom of a bottle, hence its name. (Note: Ambrósio (1934)[1912] apud Cascudo.) It is said to be forest-dwelling and quite tall.

Manuel Ambrósio (1912) wrote that it was "so tall its head touched the leaves of the tallest trees, with only one eye and one foot, an enormous, round foot, which is why he was called a bottle foot".

The creature issues shrill calls in the forest, which can confuse hunters into believing it is a lost companion. But using the call as a guide will further confuse the pursuer, as the sound bounces off and amplifies and can cause delirium and madness. The hunters then have a difficult time trying to get back on path.

The creature is blamed for witchcraft. But information is lacking whether it poses more direct threat to humans as a man-eater, or whether it even hunts living things for food. (Note: Information is lacking whether it is "mata para comer ou é inofensivo (kills for food or if it is harmless)"; It shares the "hábitos gritadores do Mapinguari e do Capelobo sem que lhe tenha vindo a antropofagia insaciável (screaming habits of Mapinguari and Capelobo without the insatiable anthropophagy having come to them)".)

=== Localization ===
The Pé de garrafa was first described by Alfredo do Vale Cabral (1884), who characterized it as a local legend of the state of Piauí. (Note: Vale Cabral (1884) apud Cascudo's dictionary (1962) and Geografica (2002) [1948]) (Note: B. Magalhães names four beings of importance from Piauí, the others being the barba ruiva ("red beard"), cabeça de cuia ("gourd head") and carneiro de ouro ("golden sheep").)

It is also known as the monster who leaves huge footprints in the sandy and clayey soil of Massapê, Ceará, also in northeastern Brazil.

Zoologist Alípio de Miranda Ribeiro had attempted a search for it in Jacobina, Mato Grosso in the Central-West. According to his informant, (Note: Identified as Sebastião Alves Correia, administrator of the farm.) it is a one-legged hairy creature with a hoof like the bottom of a bottle, and the foot tracks can confuse and make any poaieiro (backwoodsman, farmhand who works in the jungle) who is not the most capable lose his way.

== Parallels ==
Gustavo Barroso wrote it was a "species of Caapora" (Caipora), (Note: Barroso (1932). As Colunas do Templo. Rio de Janeiro: Civilização Brasileira Editora. pp. 254–255, apud Cascudo.) while Vale Cabral (1884) only suggested it shared the same forest habitat as the Caapora.

Cascudo wrote that it is a variant of the Mapinguari and Capelobo legends, however, there is no testimony that Pé de garrafa is a maneater like the others.

The round footprint resembles that of the wild man of the Basques (basajaun), and this may be a borrowed lore from the Basque people, but it is apparently not something known in Portugal. Hence if it had been transmitted, it would have been through Spaniards or Basque immigrants in Brazil.

== See also ==
- Capelobo, Amazonian humanoid monster described as having feet like the bottoms of a bottle
- Mapinguari, Amazonian humanoid monster with feet like pestles
- Caipora, Amazonian humanoid monster
- Basajaun, Basque humanoid monster said to have one odd foot that is rounded
