= Yvy marã e'ỹ =

Guarani promised land

In Guarani mythology, Yvy marã e'ỹ (or, in Portuguese, terra sem males; meaning "land without evils") refers to the paradise. It is a mythical land where there would be no hunger, wars or diseases.

== Nomenclature ==
=== Guajupiá ===
The final destination of the soul in Tupi Religion was allegedly called Guajupiá (Gûaîupîá, ûaîupîá), the "society of ancestors" (sociedade dos antepassados), and it lay beyond the mountains. However, only one source, the French priest Claude d'Abbeville of the 17th century has attested to this indigenous name "Guajupiá" for the Land without Evil (terra sem mal).

== Characteristics ==
The Tupinambá people believed in the existence of a paradise for the dead, their version of Elysium, which was the realm of the Evil Spirit Anhanga.) This paradise was reached with the help of funeral rituals and welcomed only the deserving ones with military merit, i.e., those who had killed and eaten many enemies.

According to the author of the book História do Caminho de Peabiru, Rosana Bond, this Tupi-Guarani paradise would be a real island that the vast majority of Guaranis believe to be located to the east, somewhere in the Atlantic Ocean. To reach it, one would need to be in a state of perfection that the indigenous people call aguyjé (a spiritual state). The island would therefore not be visible to any mortal and if that were the case, it would move far away, since only those who were in a state of perfection could enter.

The creator god Nhamandu would live on the island, and his home would be a hut. Inside would be the Blue Jaguar (Jaguarový or Charía) and the Original Bat (Mbopí recoypý), both contained by the god, because if released, the Blue Jaguar would destroy humanity and the Original Bat would swallow the sun. Outside the hut would be a snake, which many believe to be a Caninana. Nhamandu's hut would be surrounded by darkness, but the creative light would still shine in his chest, the same one he carried at the beginning of creation, and this would illuminate his surroundings.

According to the indigenous people, many migratory birds go to this place and return as well, such as macaws, blue manakins and thrushes. On the island, both the fauna and the flora would speak like humans.

== Search for the Land ==
In 1549, suffering from Portuguese colonization, 12,000 to 14,000 indigenous people left the coast for the Andes. Only three hundred reached Chachalpoyas, in Peru, where they were captured and imprisoned. Although it has been assumed that the search for the "land without evils" played a central role in these processes of resistance and migration, ethnohistorical works contest the veracity of this theory, due to the lack of empirical data to prove it, being the result of a reductive reading of documentary sources. According to historian Eduardo Neumann (2009):

"The migrations practiced by the Guarani are linked to the sense of land, territory and social space (...) For the Guarani, the land is not a divinity, but is impregnated with all religious experience. The land, in turn, is the support, a means for them to carry out their economy of reciprocity. It is through the land that they seek to achieve all their fulfillment. Thus, on certain occasions, due to the manifestations of spiritual leaders, their prophetic tone and the search for new lands, some ethnographers felt authorized to state that all the thinking of the Guarani was oriented around the land without evil."

— Eduardo Neumann

Furthermore, the myth of the Land without Evil or the myth of Tupi-Guarani messianism would have been generalized to all Tupi-Guarani populations, when in fact it was exclusive to the Apapocuva and Tembé, ethnographed by Curt Nimuendajú.
