= Ermanno Stradelli =

Italian explorer and photographer

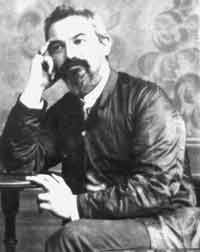
A portrait of Ermanno Stradelli

Ermanno Stradelli (1852 - 24 March 1926) was an Italian explorer, researcher and photographer. He was the first person to photograph the Amazon, arriving in Brazil in 1879. His journey has been captured in the book 'The Only Possible Life: Itineraries of Ermanno Stradelli in Amazonia' by Livia Raponi.

== The Legend of Jurupari ==
The Legend of Jurupari (La Leggenda del Jurupary) is an Amazonian founding mythical tale that is known from the transcription made from the version told at the end of the 19th century by the Brazilian indigenous Maximiano José Roberto and translated into Italian by Stradelli. It is one of the great pre-Columbian texts that have survived along with the Popol Vuh.

== Exhibitions ==
Ermanno Stradelli – pioneering photographer in the Amazon rainforest at Cultural Institute in Rio de Janeiro, 2019
