= Mohan (legendary) =

Mythological figures in South and Central American folklore

The Muan, Moan or Mohan (moo-ahn), sometimes also known as Poira, is a name applied to several mythological or otherwise supernatural creatures in South and Central American folklore. The most common use of the term is to refer to the souls of the dead and the indigenous ancestors of old. The word is also used for shamans or witch doctors in some Colombian Indigenous cultures (such as the Panches).

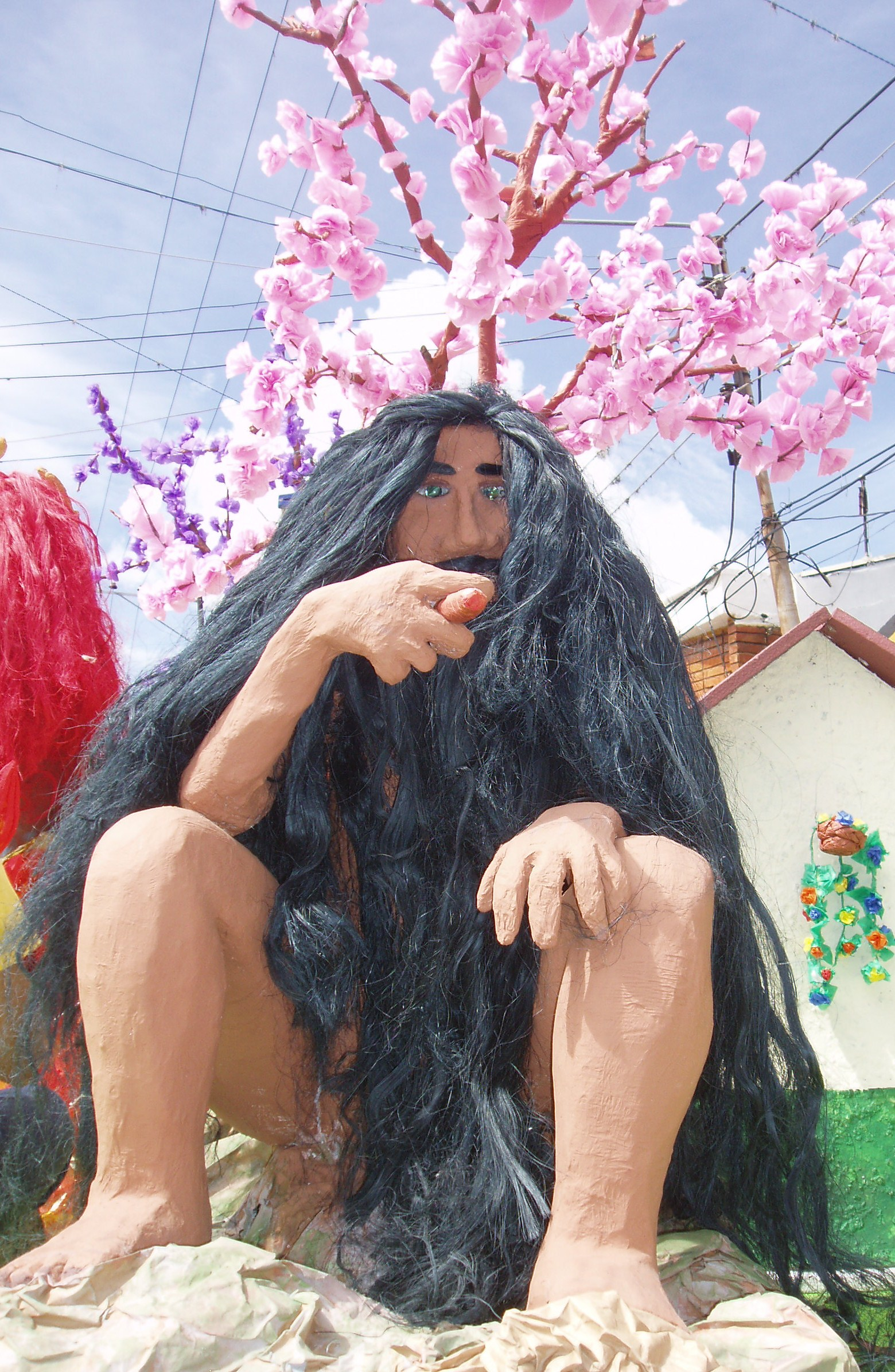
A Mohán doll.

== History ==
Various legends exist about the Mohan, with many of them emerging from Colombia. In Colombia, Mohan can also mean a forest or barren land spirit. In some legends, it is a satyr-like being who steals and eats young women and lives in a cave-like grotto at the bottom of the great jungle rivers where he keeps his female captives. In others, it is depicted as the spirit of an old Indian, brawny and stout, with a terrifying grin and stare, with larger than human stature and proportions, who steals fishermen's bait, catch or nets, and has the power to change shape into a cat-like beast. Other legends describe the Mohan as a "big-headed Indian, with short legs and fish fins on his back, and very brown." He is portrayed as an extremely hairy being with a very treacherous personality who dwells in the backwaters and is feared by many people. He also causes mischief for young girls who come to wash clothes in the water.

The Mohan is also known as an avatar whose form shamans can adopt. One myth tells of how a shaman became an alligator to be close to the girls who played in the river. The shaman could not fully transform back into a human and became an alligator with a human head. The Poira, whose name is interchangeable with the Mohan, is described by others as an Indian warlock who lives on the Cerro del Pacandé in Tolima, Colombia. The Poira is also believed to be a small, naked invisible boy or adult who can also appear formless or as a black bear.

== See also ==
- Pillan
- Curupira
- Caipora
- Patasola
- List of nature deities
