= Equinoctial France =

French colonial effort in Northern Brazil

Equinoctial France France équinoxiale
- 1612–1615
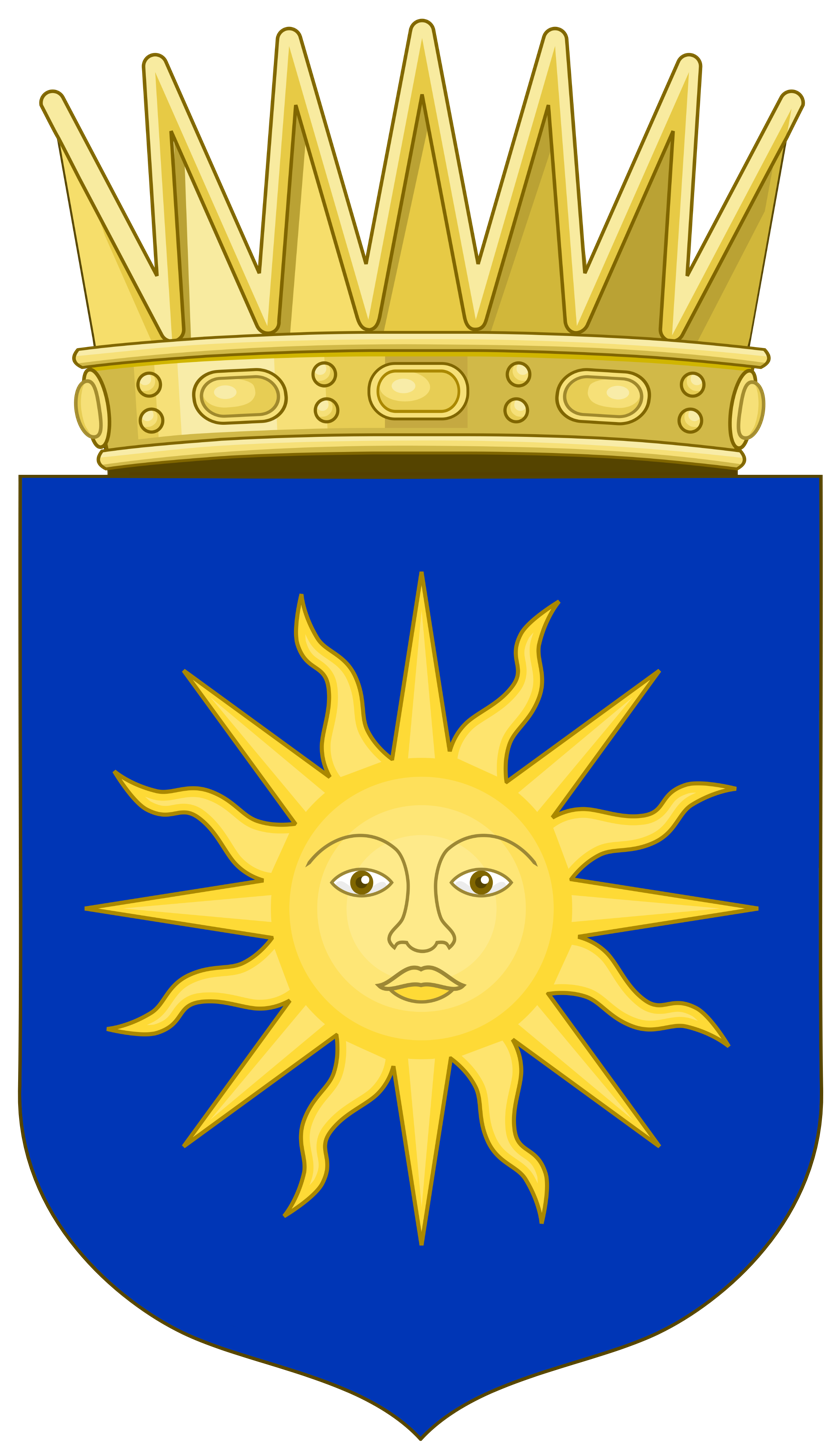
- Flag Coat of arms
- Status: French colony
- Capital: Saint-Louis (São Luís)
- Common languages: French, Indigenous languages
- Religion: Catholicism, Indigenous religions
- Governor
  - 1612–1615: Daniel de La Touche
- History
  - Establishment: 1612
  - Battle of Guaxenduba: 1614
  - Surrender of Saint-Louis: 1615
Preceded by	Succeeded by
Colonial Brazil	Colonial Brazil
- Today part of: Brazil

Equinoctial France (French: France équinoxiale) was the contemporary name given to the colonization efforts of France in the 17th century in South America, around the line of the equator, before "tropical" had fully gained its modern meaning: Equinoctial means in Latin "of equal nights", i.e., on the equator, where the duration of days and nights is nearly the same year round. The settlement was made in what is now known as the Bay of São Luis and lasted for 3 years.

The French colonial empire in the New World also included New France (Nouvelle France) in North America, extending from Canada to Louisiana, and for a short period (12 years) also included the colony of Antarctic France (France Antarctique, in French), in present-day Rio de Janeiro, Brazil. All of these settlements were in violation of the papal bill of 1493, which divided the New World between Spain and Portugal. This division was later defined more exactly by the Treaty of Tordesillas.

== History ==
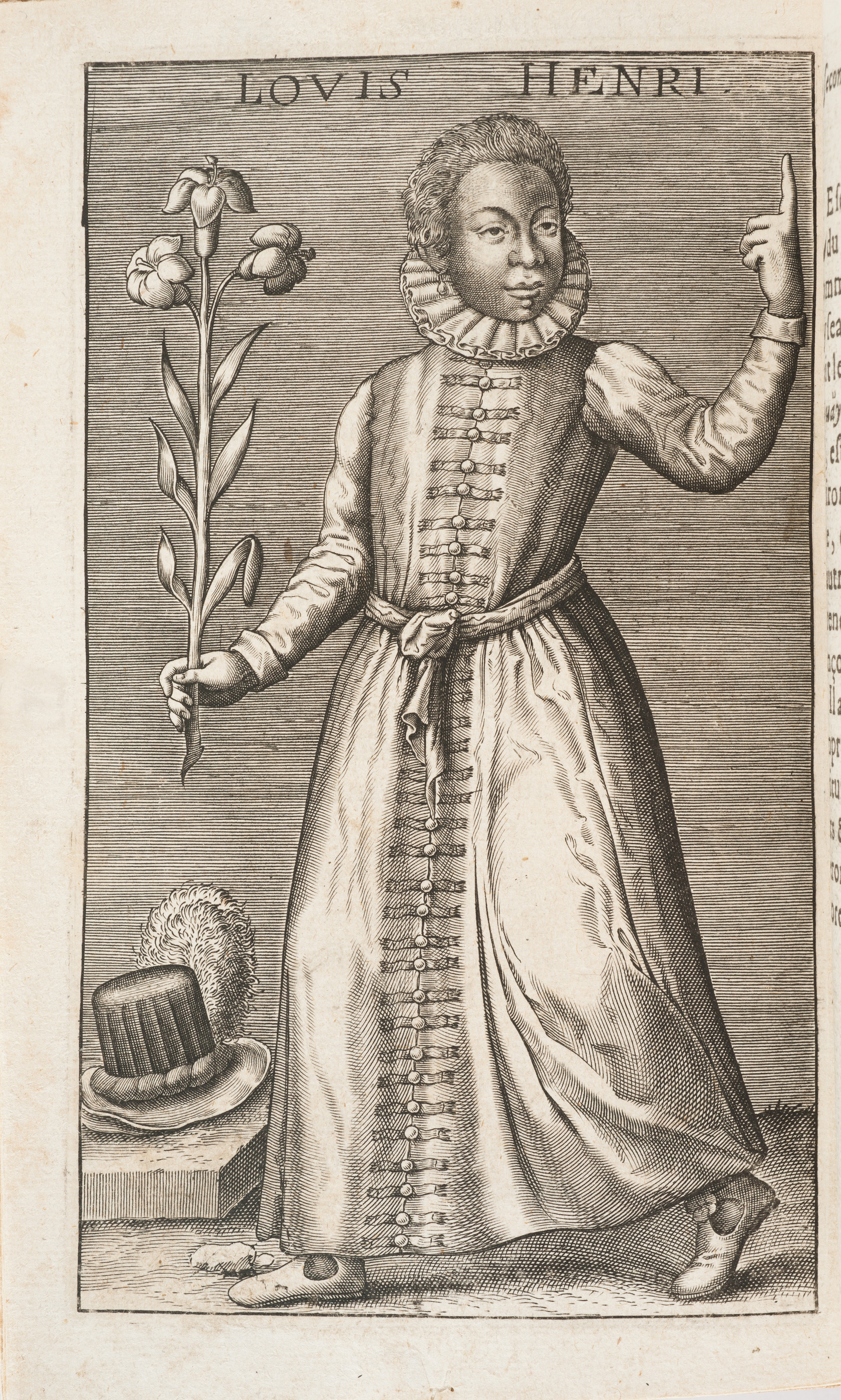
Tupinambá "Louis Henri" was sent on a visit to Louis XIII in Paris in 1613, in Claude d'Abbeville, Histoire de la mission.

The establishment of France Équinoxiale commenced in 1612, when a French expedition departed from Cancale, Brittany, France, under the command of Daniel de la Touche, Seigneur de la Ravardière, and Admiral François de Razilly. Carrying 500 colonists, it arrived on the northern coast of what is today the Brazilian state of Maranhão. De la Ravardière had discovered the region in 1604 but the death of the king, Henry IV postponed his plans to start its colonization.

The colonists soon founded a village, Saint-Louis, in honor of the French king Louis XIII. This later became São Luís in Portuguese, the only Brazilian state capital founded by France. On 8 September, Capuchin friars prayed the first mass, and the soldiers started building a fortress. An important difference in relation to France Antarctique is that this new colony was not motivated by escape from religious persecutions by Protestant Huguenots (see French Wars of Religion).

The colony did not last long. A Portuguese army assembled in the Captaincy of Pernambuco, under the command of Alexandre de Moura, was able to mount a military expedition, which defeated and expelled the French colonists in 1615, less than four years after their arrival in the land. Thus, it repeated the disaster spelt for the colonists of France Antarctique, in 1567. A few years later, in 1620, Portuguese and Brazilian colonists arrived in number and São Luís started to develop, with an economy based mostly in sugar cane and slavery.

French traders and colonists tried again to settle a France Équinoxiale further North, in what is today French Guiana, in 1626, 1635 (when the capital, Cayenne, was founded) and 1643. Twice a Compagnie de la France Équinoxiale was founded, in 1643 and 1645, but both foundered as a result of misfortune and mismanagement. It was only after 1674, when the colony came under the direct control of the French crown and a competent Governor took office, that France Équinoxiale became a reality. To this day, French Guiana is a department of France.

== See also ==
- History of French Guiana
- History of Brazil
- Antarctic France
- French colonisation of the Americas
- List of French possessions and colonies
- French invasions in Brazil
