= François de Razilly =

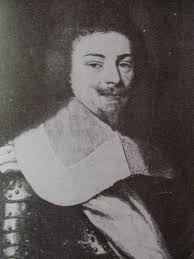
Portrait of François de Razilly

François de Razilly was a French nobleman of the 17th century who led the colonial enterprise to found "France Équinoxiale". He headed a colonial party of about 500 to an island which would become the city of São Luís do Maranhão. He arrived in the island in August 1612.

He was the brother of two other famous sailors and explorers, Isaac de Razilly and Claude de Razilly.
