= Caipora =

Entity in Brazil mythology

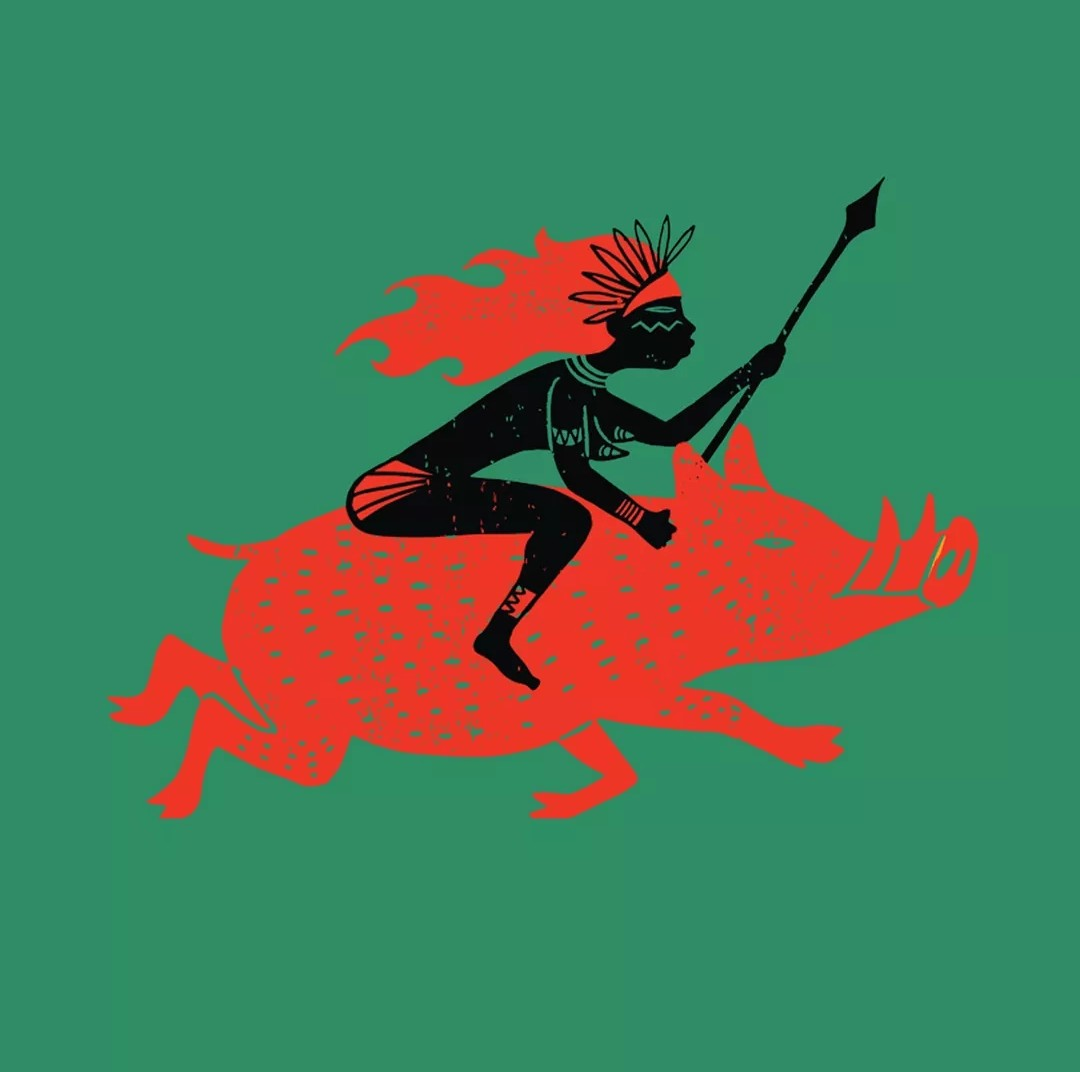
Caipora riding a "forest hog" (porco-do-mato) or peccary

Caipora (Portuguese pronunciation: [kajˈpɔɾɐ]) or Caapora (Kaapora) is a forest spirit or humanoid and guardian of wildlife or game in Brazilian folklore.

The word "Caipora" comes from Tupi and means "inhabitant of the forest" and perhaps may be traced to Kaagere (also meaning "forest dweller" and an alias of anhanga) of the Tupi-Guaraní mythology, but this is far from definite.

Caipora is variously represented as a dark-skinned, small Native American girl (caboclinha) or boy (caboclinho), a dwarf or large-sized hairy humanoid or beast. It is often said to ride an animal such as the peccary and is armed with a stick or whip made of certain plants. It takes bribes of tobacco and alcohol and sometimes also has a pipe.

Its description varies greatly depending on the region or source. It is sometimes confused with Curupira, which is another mythological creature who protects the forest, but it is also amenable to comparison with other mythical creatures (Saci, Pé de garrafa) with which it may share certain traits.

== Nomenclature ==
Luís da Câmara Cascudo contended that Caapora (Caapóra) is the masculine and Caipora (Caipóra) is the feminine form (thus preceded by feminine definite article: "A Caipora" ); the gender changed by vowel shift from a to i. Or, Caipora is the vulgarized spelling, while Kaapora is the localized name used in the states of Rio Grande do Norte, Paraíba and Ceará, etc., according to João Barbosa Rodrigues.

Other alternate forms are Cahapora or Cahipora.

In Bahia, the being is female, and her name is corrupted to Caiçara/Kaiçara due to assimilation with Caa-iara, the lady of the forest, and caa-içá, meaning "fence, etc.", but this term is generally recognized as having other meanings: "caiçaras" refer to coastal-dwelling people, derived from caiçara, referring to branches used by fishermen to trap fish. (Note: It can also be a derogatory term for a country bumpkin of lower origins in Western São Paulo. Sense 4 given by Teschauer.) (See further description of Kaiçara, below).

=== Etymology ===
The terms caapora and caaguera/kaagere (syn. anhanga) both mean "forest dweller", containing the stem caa "forest" in Tupi. (Note: From Tupi meaning "dweller of forest (morador do mato)")

Alternative etymologies are that Caiporo may descend from cai-pora meaning "one who carries fire" or "one who burns"; or possibly from caí-pora "one who is shy" or "one who runs away" according to the gloss by Teodoro Fernandes Sampaio (1928).

=== Figurative use ===
The term Caipora is figuratively applied to persons whose presence or intervention is considered to be of bad influence (Note: Beaurepaire-Rohan (1889) Diccionario" paraphrased by Cascudo Geografica.) and sometimes also applied to persons who are going through tough times, with bad luck and unhappiness. Note that according to the natives, the Caapora is so powerful that the Indian who has encountered it becomes unsuccessful at every step, (Note: A singer of the Timbira tribe of the northeast describing the Kaapora, cited by Barbosa Rodrigues (1890)) that is to say, a hunter or fisherman who encountered it could be afflicted with ill-lucked caipórismo for the rest of his life. (Note: Some Brazilian writers, which include Machado de Assis and Aluísio de Azevedo also used the words "Caipora" and "Caiporism" to identify a state of misfortune.)

The word "Caipora" has also been used to describe the slaves who had escaped into the forests.

== Description ==
The lore specifically about the Caapora/Caipora is not attested by the Jesuits and cannot be classed as a piece of native Tupi-Guarani myth known from the missionary era, unless the aforementioned identity with the Kaagere/Anhanga can be ascertained, but Casudo considers the original ancestry of the Caapora to be obscure.

Nevertheless, the lore is ubiquitous all over Brazil, and they are said to inhabit not only the Amazon rainforest but also "the hills of Rio Grande do Sul or the fields of Santa Catarina and Minas Gerais" in the south.

=== Dwarf or giant, boy or girl ===
The Caapora is described as dwarf-sized being, looking like an indigenous human (Note: , also quoted by Cascudo.) and dark-skinned. Sometimes described as a large-headed child and other times as an enchanted caboclinha (diminutive female form of caboclo, i.e., indigenous girl-child), or enchanted caboclinho (boy) (Note: Ambrósio (1934) [1912] also quoted by Cascudo (1983), p. 98; Cascudo (2002), p. 121.) though still considered a "dark, robust, hairy, agile" girl/boy at that. The girl form may be naked or be wearing a tanga/thong (or loincloth). Cascudo believes there is relative consensus that Caapora is a dwarf figure.

However, by a number of commentators, the Caapora is considered a giant, e.g., "a large man covered in black hair" by José Vieira Couto de Magalhães, and by others. (Note: Cascudo here names only one: Emílio Allain, cited by Barbosa Rodrigues) João Simões Lopes Neto (1913) described it as a hairy giant man. Couto de Magalhães also records a Nheengatu (Tupi) tale about the Jabuti (tortoise) and the giant Caapora". Additionally Juan Bautista Ambrosetti (1917) also recorded that the "Caá-Porá" was considered a hairy giant with shaggy hair in the state of Paraná. This Caá-Porá would eat raw the animals downed by hunters but left undiscovered. Cornélio Pires (1921) described the caipora as a cabocro (var. of caboclo (Note: A caboclo may be an indigenous person as already explained, or possibly be a European mix)) and a "big, fat guy, hairy as a beast, bearded, short-headed, with a flat snub nose, thick lips and a full face". (Note: Pires, Cornélio 1st ed. (1921), with 3rd ed. (1927) quoted by Cascudo (1983), p. 98; Cascudo (2002), pp. 120–121.)

The Caapora of Ceará is bristly-headed, but not hairy-bodied, with sharp teeth like the howler monkey, and (glowing red (Note: "eyes blazing")) eyes like embers. Elsewhere in the Northeast Region, it rides a deer or even a rabbit (suggesting a small size).

Bahia's Kaiçara is dark-skinned, that is, "a small cabocla, almost black", whereas in Ilhéus, Bahia, they know her as Kaapora and describe her as a "young cabocla, fair-skinned and beautiful". Furthermore, in one Bahia tale, the Caipora is an "old black man", who after receiving tobacco, aids a man lost in the woods by using a freshly cut stick (vara) to magically transport him back home. In a second Bahia tale, the Caipora was a hairy little boy, only one side of whom could be seen, and black as a devil.

=== Habitat, mounting animals, herd, dog ===
He dwells in the (hollows of) rotting trees, according to an ethnic Timbira informant. Some say he dwells with the so-called "forest hog" (porco-do-mato) or peccary. He also famously mounts these creatures for his rides. The "forest hog " may be either the creature known in Portuguese as queixada (white-lipped peccary) or caititu (collared peccary). He may also ride a tapir, porcupine, or other creatures.

Caipora rides his pig or peccary while holding a stick and waves it around to cause them to flee (so as to spoil the hunt for undeserving hunters), (Note: According to Japanese entomologist Daisaburō Okumoto: "an angered caipora leaps onto a queixada (peccary) and runs around the forest, swinging a stick, causing all the animals to flee (怒ったカイポーラはケイシャーダ(引用者注:ペッカリーのこと)にとび乗って森の中を走り回り、棒をふりまわしてすべての動物を逃がしてしまう)") or just to drive his animal, as with a riding crop. (Note: Okumoto considers caipora and curupira to be synonymous, but chooses to discuss in terms of caipora. Cf. Azevedo (2000), who after prefacing that Caapora, Caipora are among the aliases of Curupira, writes that the Curupira holds a "thick piece of wood (pedaço de pau grosso)".) (Note: Note that the she-Caipora was described as invisibly clubbing (garrotea) the dogs. Ambrosetti thinks this lore derives from hunting dogs yelping after getting tangled in thorny bush.)

In the Northeast, he is said to carry a whip of the spiny vine (Portuguese: japecanga/yapekanga, a Smilax sp. (Note: The English translation "greenberries" should actually read "greenbriar".)) and by transforming into any beast he wishes, lures the dogs into the woods then whips them while riding a deer or rabbit.

The Caipora's weapon may be described as simply a "thorny vine" or "spiny liana" (Portuguese: cipó espinhento), and may be made from various plants, such as the japecanga, nettle, nettlespurge, (Note: Latin name Jatropha pohliana, though given in Portuguese as pinhão bravo lit. "wild pine" by Cascudo.) or favela (Cnidoscolus quercifolius). In some states, she is said to use the thorny liana vine to punish to death an ex-lover who has gone off to marry another girl (cf.§ Love relationships). (Note: Lore of Pará, Amazonas and Acre)

Some say the Caapora controls a massive herd of caititu peccaries, riding the largest of them, or that he rides the last pig at the rearguard of the whole herd. In a Bahia tale, the boy-Caipora rides a lean, bony pig out of the pack. Some state he is surrounded by all kinds of beasts, not only peccaries and deer, but even serpents and insects. He allegedly uses fireflies to act as his scouts.

=== Protector of wild game ===
The Caipora is lord and protector of small game (the lesser-sized animals that are hunted), but she does not have dominion over feathered game (birds).

Formerly it was considered to be easily bribed with tobacco and cachaça liquor to bestow a bountiful catch. The caboclinha is even said to encircle passers-by at night, demanding tobacco for her pipe (cachimbo). In its female aspect, the Caipora is compared to Diana the huntress-goddess of Roman myth, as Caipora may assist or hinder the hunt depending on the state of grace of the hunter. If displeased with the hunter, she will club the hunting dogs with an invisible weapon. (Note: Cascudo records testimony from one José Belém Bacurau (nicknamed Zé Crato) stating he witnessed his dog being beaten by the invisible Caipora, and upon reflection concluded it was because he broke the Friday hunting taboo.) Cascudo writes that she also loves unflavored porridge (Portuguese: mingau) without salt or sugar, and she especially hates peppercorn, so that she will refuse the peppered gruel and beat the person under her grace.

The Caipora is very vengeful of hunters who do not respect the rules of "fair-play" when hunting. The Caipora particularly frowns upon the hunting of pregnant females and those with their young. It is said that the caipora scares away prey (makes them disappear so none to be found to hunt), sets traps, or makes hunters lose their way in the jungle by disorients the hunters with simulated animal noises or by leaving fake tracks. (Note: However, the Caipora lacks the "feet turned backwards (pés voltados para trás)" which is a well-attested feature of the Curupira.)

According to a popular belief, its activity intensifies on those days in which hunting is not supposed to take place, therefore on Fridays (or moonlit Fridays), it is a taboo to hunt, and on Sundays and religious days, it is forbidden or limited to hunts of precise nature. Thus Caipora lays in wait among the ferns on Fridays and causes the hunt to fail: all the game disappears, and, even worse, the hunter's shot will hit a companion or a dog. In one collected anecdote (from Guarabira, Paraíba), a man who went hunting on a Friday found no game, except a dove (Portuguese: juruti, juriti, Leptotila genus), and though he shot its crop and its innards fell out, the bird revived and flew away.

While religious belief prohibits the hunt on a Friday, Sunday, or holidays, there is a possibility one could bribe the protector of the forest out of punishment by bribing him with rope tobacco. The hunter should go to a trunk of a tree, make the offering, preferably before the hunt on a Thursday night, and say "Here you go, Caipora, [now] let me go away (Toma, Caipora, deixa eu ir embora)". However, this bribe is not failproof.

As in the foregoing example (dove), it is said that the Caipora even has the power to resurrect creatures (Note: Or revive members of its own pig herd.) by various means, "at the touch of pig's snout (see example below), (Note: i.e., probably the pig he is riding, not Caipora's pig-like snout) his stinger-goad (see example below), Smilax (greenbriar) branch, or by verbal command". (Note: Cascudo's dictionary. Rather poorly translated.)

In the aforementioned Caipora as a hairy black boy, who was half invisible and rode a thin pig (tale 2 from Bahia), a hunter shoots several pig with a rifle, but the Caipora arrives holding a "stinger" (ferrão, or rather his sting-tipped goad). When the Caipora strikes the downed pigs, they all revive, but the sting breaks off when he overdoes his battering of the last, largest pig. The Caipora then turns up in disguise at the blacksmith's tent to have the sting on the goad repaired.

Another manner in which the Caapora is described as dispensing its boon of hunting is that in exchange for the offering of tobacco, booze (cachaça), or baize (Portuguese: baieta, coarse woolen material), it would allow so-many wild pigs or pigs from its own herd to be shot by the blessed hunter. If the hunter is without blessing, his bullets will be useless because any pig shot dead will revive at the touch of the snout of the Caapora's riding pig.

=== As terror ===
After an encounter with the caipora, a person is overtaken with the dread of terror. More sinister characterizations accuse him of luring children into his dwelling in a rotten tree. The Caá-Porá is even alleged to carry a pipe made from a human skull and tibia and is supposed to devour humans by sucking on them, leaving the intestines scattered.

The Caipora is merely a ghost that transforms into a pig or dog in regions of Argentina and Uruguay according to Cascudo, such a being is described by Juan Bautista Ambrosetti, who remarks that as the shapeshifting specter, the appellation changes from Caá-Porá to just "Porá" denoting a type of ghost. He adds that it breathes fire to scare the animals away.

=== Love relationships ===
And "in the forests of Pará, Amazonas and Acre, the modern-day Caipora allegedly engages in romantic commerce with humans, but demands absolute fidelity". Recorded lore from the state of São Paulo also alleges the hairy Caapora chases after unmarried girls who are out alone at night.

== Comparative analysis ==
Cascudo, who considered Caipora to be feminine, as aforementioned, further wrote "Curupiras and Caaporas merged into Caipora, or rather, into the Caipora that the inhabitants of Acre describe, as do the people of the Northeast, as a small, dark, robust, hairy, agile caboclinha (female child caboclo), with her hair covering her sex, hunting whoever gives her tobacco and having extremely jealous love[-relationships]". Later literature has ascribed the dark-skinned Caapora with red hair, in common with the Curupira.

The Caapora and Curupira are to an extent mutually substitutable, and what is told about the one in some region will hold true for the other according to tradition elsewhere or according to a variant source. Just as the Caipora rides the peccary and swings his stick, Curupira is known to mount a porco-do-mato (peccary) and carry a "thick piece of wood".

Cascudo also noted it may be ascribed as having double right feet like some Curupira, or be one-legged like the Saci (or unipedal woman), and also be considered either two-eyed or one-eyed (like the Arimaspi, Scythian race dwelling near gold-guarding griffins). Caapora is not known to be a guardian of vegetation, in contrast to the Curupira, but Caapora was the lord of smaller game. Besides being one-eyed, the Caipora has been ascribed a round foot, like the Pé de garrafa ("bottle-foot").

In the state of Sergipe, Caipora is alleged to kill people by tickling, which is characteristic of the Saci. Caipora may be a tobacco-loving girl carrying a pipe (or a hairy man, or a hairy beast with one), just as the Saci is commonly depicted as holding a pipe.

Casucudo floated the possibility that Caapoora/Caipora might possibly traced to the lore of the Kaagere (var. Kaagerre, Kaagire or Kaigerre), anhanga (French transliteration: Agnan (Note: Thevet lists the names Agnan, Raa-Onan or Kaa-Gerr as quoted.)), recorded by André Thevet in the 16th century. The description suggests that the indigenous tribes believed the kaagere/anhanga that come at night to do evil-doing could be warded off using fire. The poet Antônio Gonçalves Dias (1867) was convinced Caapora and Kaagere were identical, as they were of the same "forest-dweller" meaning etymologically.

Casucudo observed that the Chilean analogue of the Caipora might be the Anchimallén of Mapuche lore. The Anchimallén too was a protector of animals, also accepted offerings (though of blood), and dealt out misfortune and heralded bad news. An Argentine analogue might be the yastay or llastay (though this yastay may also count as part of Chilean mythology), who is depicted as a frostburned short fat man, and protector especially of the herds of camelids such as the guanaco and vicuña. He also has a black dog as constant companion.

== Pop culture references ==
In the children's TV series Castelo Rá-Tim-Bum, Caipora is a regular character. In this version is characterized as a female creature with a big red fur and a black mask. She has the ability to teleport when hear whistles and sometimes demonstrates wild aspects.

In the 2001 TV adaptation of Sítio do Picapau Amarelo the character was introduced between the last two seasons as a regular character.

In Harry Potter, the Caipora protect the magical school Castelobruxo in Brazil. They are described as small, furry, and extremely mischievous.

Artes do Caipora em Cordel, an illustrated children's book written by the poet and folklorist Marco Haurélio and illustrated by Luciano Tasso, was published in 2013. The story accounts as a hunter who disobeys his father by going to hunt on a holy day; he finds the Caipora, who resuscitates all the animals that he slaughtered.

In Legend Quest: Masters of Myth, the Caipora makes an appearance on the episode of the same name.

In Arthur Conan Doyle's 1912 book The Lost World Native tribes used the term Curupuri or Spirit of the Wood to describe the mysterious plateau where prehistoric dinosaurs and ape-men lived and the goal of the expedition.

== See also ==
- Capoeira – Afro-Brazilian martial art
- Mohan (legendary) – Mythological figures in South and Central American folklore, alias of pora mentioned above
- Nhanderuvuçu -creator god in Tupi-Guarani mythology, also created Caapora
- Nisse - Scandinavian brownie, also fastidious about its porridge offering, and accepts coarse woolen material as gift.
- Mono Grande – Mythical South American ape
- Patasola – Vampire-like creature in South American folklore
