= Tapire-iauara =

Amazonian Cryptid

The tapire-iauara (Note: also tapiraiuara, tapiraiaura, onça d'água) is a legendary creature in the folklore of the Amazon rainforest region. Jacques Cousteau in his book Jacques Cousteau's Amazon journey describes how the caboclos believe that the "tapir-nymph patrols the flooded forest to guard it from humans." In her book Journey of the Pink Dolphins: An Amazon quest, Sy Montgomery relates that "it grows big as a cow and attacks people in boats".
