= Claude d'Abbeville =

French explorer

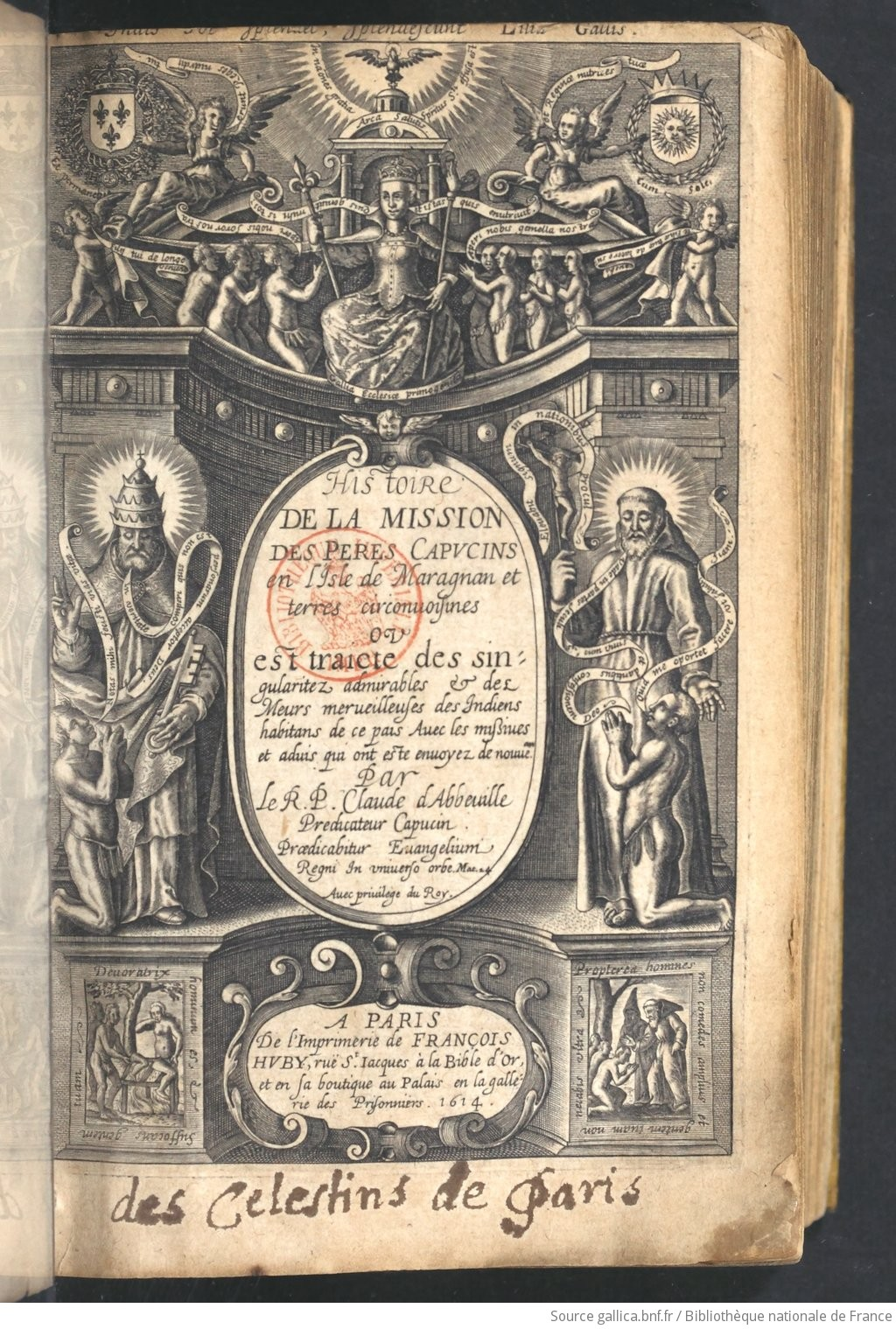
Frontispiece to Histoire de la mission, by Claude d'Abbeville

Claude d'Abbeville was a 17th-century French Franciscan friar who worked as a missionary with the Tupinambá in Maranhão, modern Brazil. He was part of a colonizing party and a mission of four Franciscans sent under a 1611 patent letter from the Regent Marie de Médicis, and was also accompanied by Father Yves D'Evreux.

== Biography ==
The colonial enterprise to found "France Équinoxiale" was led by Daniel de la Tousche, sieur de la Ravardière, and François de Razilly. The outpost would later become the city of São Luís do Maranhão. The French arrived in the island in August 1612. One of the objectives of the mission was to establish trade in brazilwood and tobacco.

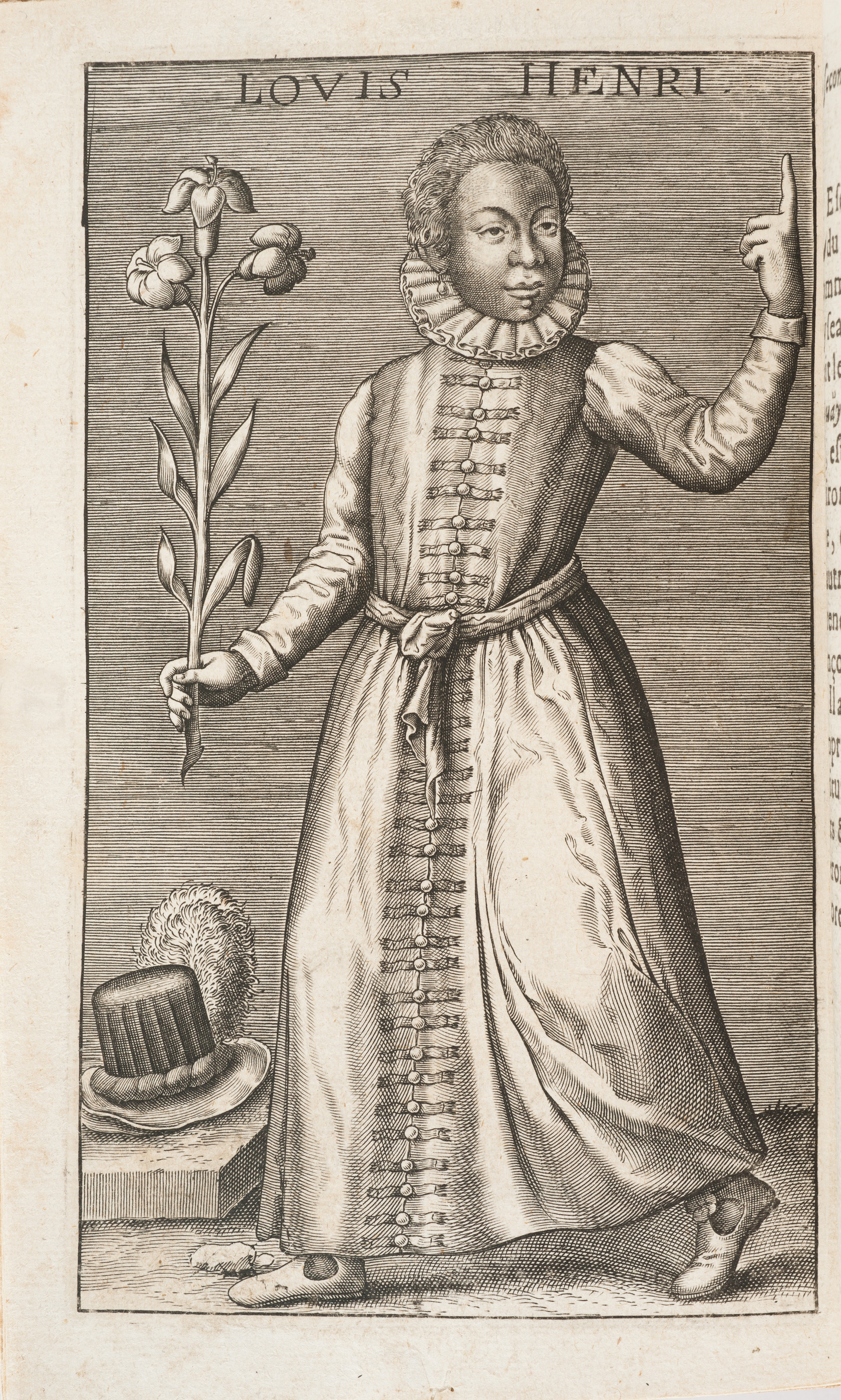
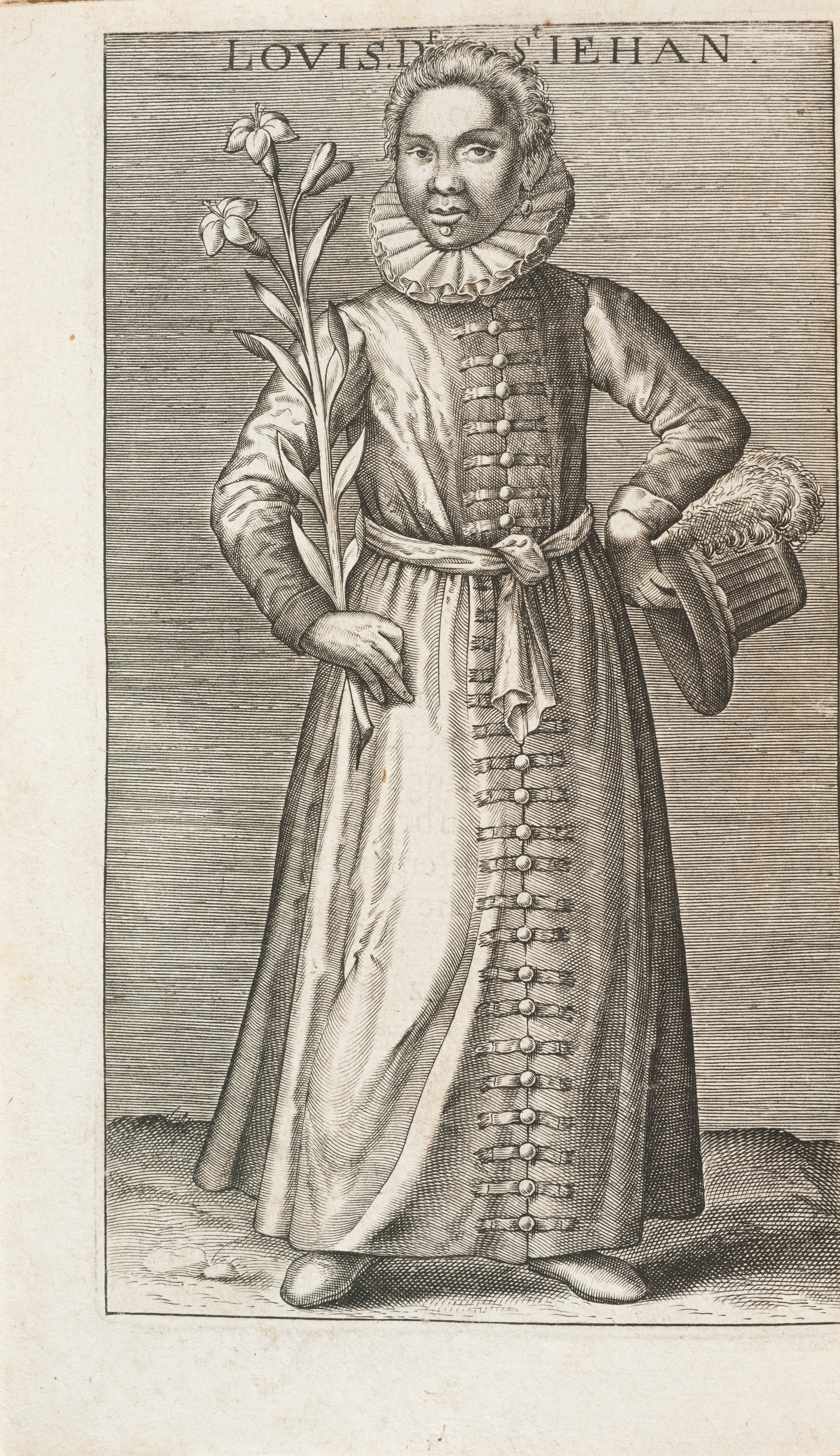
Tupinambás "Louis Henri" (left) and "Louis de St. Iehan" (right) at the court of Louis XIII, in Claude d'Abbeville Histoire de la mission, 1614

The fathers worked on the island of Maragnan in the mouth of the Amazon, where the French Fort Saint Louis was founded as a Roman Catholic mission in 1612-15. The two fathers Claude d'Abbeville and Yves D'Evreux learned the Tupinambá language and wrote about their experience.

The Catholic colonial endeavours of the early 17th century followed the earlier Protestant attempts at establishing a colony in South America, especially the short-lived France Antarctique, and marked the recent domination of the Catholic faith over Protestantism in France.

The Tupinambá were in alliance with the French, with the objective of resisting Portuguese encroachments.

The mission organized the dispatch of Tupinambá Indians from Maragnan to the court of Louis XIII in France, where they created a sensation. Père Claude d'Abbeville commented enthusiastically on the visit of the Indians in Paris with the words: "Who would have thought that Paris, used to the strange and the exotic, would go so wild over these Indians?". The Indians – only three out of a total six had survived the travel by that time – were baptized in the Church of the Capuchins.

When France and Spain (including Portugal in the Iberian Union) became allied through the marriage of Louis XIII with Anne of Austria in 1615, support for the colony was discontinued and the colonists abandoned. The Portuguese soon managed to expel the French from the colony. The book by Claude d'Abbeville was removed from circulation, and similar work by Yves D'Evreux and Francois Huby was destroyed.

== Works ==
- Claude d'Abbeville. Histoire de la mission des pères Capucins en l'isle de Maragnan et terres circonvoisines (History of the Mission of the Capuchin Fathers to the Island of Maranhão), Paris: F. Huby, 1614.

== Sources ==
- de Asúa, Miguel; French, Roger (2005). A New World of Animals: Early Modern Europeans on the Creatures of Iberian America. Aldershot-Burlington: Ashgate. ISBN 0-7546-0779-8.
- Dickason, Olive Patricia (2001). "The Sixteenth Century French Vision of the Empire: The Other Side of Self-Determination". In Warkentin, Germaine; Podruchny, Carolyn (eds.). Decentring the Renaissance: Canada and Europe in multidisciplinary perspective, 1500-1700. G - Reference, Information and Interdisciplinary Subjects Series. University of Toronto Press. pp. 87–109. ISBN 0-8020-8149-5.
- MacCormack, Sabine (2000). "Ethnography in South America: The First Two Hundred Years". In Trigger, Bruce G.; Salomon, Frank; Washburn, Wilcomb E. (eds.). The Cambridge history of the native peoples of the Americas Part I. Vol. III. Cambridge University Press. pp. 96–187. ISBN 0-521-63075-4.
- Wilson, J. G.; Fiske, J., eds. (1900). "Abbeville, Claude d'" . Appletons' Cyclopædia of American Biography. New York: D. Appleton.
