= Sítio do Picapau Amarelo =

Sítio do Picapau Amarelo may refer to:

== Literature ==
- Sítio do Picapau Amarelo (novel series), a novel series by Monteiro Lobato
- Sítio do Picapau Amarelo (fictional farm), the primary setting for the novel series

== Television ==
- Sítio do Pica-pau Amarelo (1952 TV series), a Brazilian television series
- Sítio do Picapau Amarelo (1977 TV series), a Brazilian television series
- Sítio do Picapau Amarelo (2001 TV series), a Brazilian television series
- Sítio do Picapau Amarelo (2012 TV series), a Brazilian animated television series

== Other uses ==
- Sítio do Picapau Amarelo (comics), a Brazilian comic book series
- Sítio do Picapau Amarelo (video game), a 1997 video game
