= Emilia (Sítio do Picapau Amarelo) =

Emília
- Sítio do Picapau Amarelo character
- Emília with the Visconde de Sabugosa. An illustration of J. U. Campos for Memórias de Emília.
- First appearance: 1920 (A Menina do Narizinho Arrebitado); 1977 (O Sítio do Picapau Amarelo); 2001 (Reino das Águas Claras)
- First game: Sítio do Picapau Amarelo
- Last appearance: 1947 (Histórias Diversas); 1986 (A Trilha das Araras); 2007 (O Anjinho da Asa Quebrada)
- Created by: Monteiro Lobato
- Portrayed by: Lúcia Lambertini (1952-1965); Olga Maria (1953); Dulce Margarida (Some Few Episodes In 1952 TV series); Zodja Pereira (1967-1969); Leda Zepellin (1973); Dirce Migliaccio (1977); Reny de Oliveira (1978-1982); Suzana Abranches (1983-1986); Isabelle Drummond (2001-2006); Tatyane Goulart (2007); Débora Gomez (since 2021); Lindainês Deterling (since 2023)
- Voiced by: Isabella Guarnieri (2012-2016)

In-universe information
- Species: Rag doll Human
- Gender: Female
- Occupation: Adventurer; Marchioness of Rabicó; Countess of Three Tiny Stars
- Family: Lúcia "Little Nose" Encerrabodes de Oliveira (owner); Pedro "Pedrinho" Encerrabodes de Oliveira; Benta Encerrabodes de Oliveira; Aunt Nastácia; The Viscount of Sabugosa
- Relatives: Marquess of Rabicó (spouse)
- Nationality: Brazilian

Emília, also known as the Marchioness of Rabicó or Emília, A Boneca Gente ("The Human Doll") is a fictional character and a titular of the Sítio do Picapau Amarelo series of fantasy novels written by Brazilian author Monteiro Lobato.

A rag doll with a rough, antagonistic personality and an independent, anarchist behaviour, Emília is Lobato's most popular creation alongside Jeca Tatu. According to studies and analyses of Lobato's work, she is his personification in the stories and, through the character, he expressed his own ideas. Even though Lobato has stated that Emília is "sometimes so independent that neither I, nor her father, succeed in controlling her". Since 1951, Emília has been adapted to stage plays, theatrical films and television series, being portrayed by several actresses (eleven altogether) since its creation.

== History ==
Emília is a rag doll described as "clumsy" or "ugly", resembling a "witch" that was handmade by Aunt Nastácia, the ranch's cook, for the little girl Lúcia, also known as "Little Nose". Some day, while at the creek of a nearby stream, Lucia fell asleep and was supposedly (as the narrative initially suggests the girl could be dreaming) awaken by a tiny fish and his friend, a cockchafer, while they talked to each other on her upturned nose. The two of them were flung afar after Lúcia sneezed because of their presence.

Emília, illustrated by artist Manoel Victor Filho

Thinking that Lúcia was a monster, the bug left, but the fish (dressed in suit and tie), stood, and introduced himself as the Scaly Prince from the Clear Waters Kingdom. Lúcia introduced herself and a still inanimate Emília, and both were invited to visit the Prince's underwater kingdom. Lúcia then discovered that the stream was a portal to a wondrous place full of other talking fishes and insects. As the frog guard, Major Sticky, was found sleeping at the Palace's gateway, the Prince suggested Lúcia to dress him with Emília's skirt, and obligated him to eat several sea rocks as a punishment for sleeping while working. At the dinner, Lúcia first met Doctor Snail, and complained about Emília's current situation. The Doctor then medicated the doll with a dose of his pills (the same Major Sticky later accidentally ingested, mistaking them with sea rocks), and Emília suddenly started talking, and would never stop henceforth. She immediately nominated herself as the "Marchioness of Rabicó", the "Countess of Three Tiny Stars". Lúcia then was forced to go back to surface as Aunt Nastácia screamed loud enough to shake the bottom of the sea.

Lúcia arrived home surprising her tender grandmother, Mrs. Benta, and scaring Aunt Nastácia, with her brand-new, talkative and living Emília. Later, Emília met Lúcia's cousin that arrived from town, Pedrinho. Emília's position as the "Marchioness of Rabicó" makes Lúcia have the idea of promoting a royal engagement between the doll and the greasy, fat and lazy pig of the same name, starting to treat her as an actual marchioness and bride. Emília believes when Lúcia tells her that the pig had been a charming prince one day, before an evil fairy cursed him. The doll decides she will accept the pig's "proposal", even though she won't live with Rabicó until he turns back to normal. Lúcia suggested the creation of a nearby "royal" figure. Primally using a corn cob, Pedrinho then created the "Viscount of Sabugosa", which in an unknown form came to life and, beyond the wedding prank, would become Emília's counterpart to the boy. Believing in everything, Emília was then "married" to Rabicó, for Lúcia and Pedrinho's delight, but was led to a disastrous after-party when the pig attacked the homemade candies, for Emília's disgust. The doll fainted after Pedrinho revealed her the truth about Rabicó's "curse". At a dinner, Emília roughly celebrated as everybody thought Aunt Nastácia had roasted her husband, for Lúcia's despair.

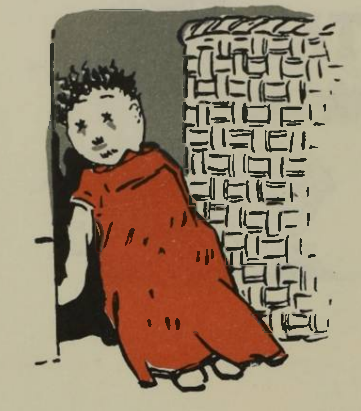
Emília in 1920

This time with Rabicó, the Viscount and Pedrinho, Lúcia and Emília returned to the Underwater Kingdom as Lúcia receives a letter from the fishes, stating that the Prince, after her sudden departure, was left in sadness. At the Kingdom, for everyone's surprise, the Viscount reveals himself to have the mind of an intellectual biologist. He and his people, for Emília's delight, are invited by Narizinho to visit their ranch. Emília insists to Mrs. Benta to exchange one of the cows for a whale from the Kingdom. As one of the guests, Miss Sardine (a pilchard), gets fried after she confuses Aunt Nastácia's boiling oil with a swimming pool, the Prince and his subjects decide to leave the Yellow Woodpecker Ranch. However, Lúcia had yet no rescue the Prince, as he had "unlearned the art of swimming" after too much time away from the water.

Emília creates dissension with who appears to be Felix the Cat, after he arrives in the rach with "gawky" stories (all of them contradicted by the Viscount). She is decided to think of a tale better than the one told by Felix the night before, and succeeds, as everybody applauds her, leaving the Cat jealous. After one of the fowls is killed and devoured, the Viscount starts a Sherlock Holmes-like investigation, and the Cat, which in fact is not Felix, is expelled by Aunt Nastácia.

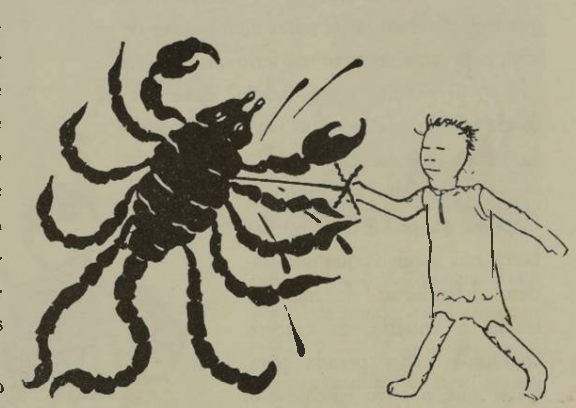
Emília in A Menina do Narizinho Arrebitado

In the most original volume of the series, A Chave do Tamanho ("The Size Key"), Emília commits her greatest act, after noticing that the horror of World War II is causing pain in everyone, particularly Mrs. Benta, and filling the ranch with sadness. Traveling by the magical powder of Pirlimpimpim, Emília visits a house where are placed the Keys that can turn on and turn off the impossible to the most unimaginable things. Attempting to turn down the Key of War, Emília chooses the wrong one, and turns down the Key that controls the size equilibrium of every human being. Emília founds herself hundreds of times smaller, among her dress, and later finds out that she caused the same to happen with the whole humanity. The doll becomes smaller enough to settle her own "ranch" on the Viscount's topper. As the small people become used to their new life, Emília manages to visit the White House, where she interacts with the President of the United States and questions him about the War. After realizing that the Size was "evil" since the scarcity from before the shrinkage have been replaced by abundance, Emília proposes a referendum, so people will vote either for or against the Size. After everyone agrees to return to their normal size, Emília takes the Viscount to the House of Keys, where he turns the Size on once again.

Other occasion was the literal reform the doll proposed to the whole nature, which ended up with earthworms, insects such like ants and centipedes, as well as microscopic beings such as fleas, having their sizes increased to the proportion of a dog (the opposite to what happened in A Chave do Tamanho).

== Tie-ins ==
Emília, alongside the Viscount and Mrs. Benta, is featured in a tie-in biographical novel written by Brazilian author Luciana Sandrini, Minhas Memórias de Lobato ("My Lobato Memories"). The story is similar to Memórias de Emília, but in Minhas Memórias, the doll decides to write about her creator, once again with the "help" of the Viscount. Mrs. Benta then tells them his story, detailing his entire life, from childhood to his final years.

Author Moacyr Scliar has a short story, Por Onde Anda Emília"? (literally "Whatever Happened to Emilia?"), in which he suggests the fates of the doll and her family after several years have passed. While Mrs. Benta and Aunt Nastácia had died, Rabicó had been turned into ham after all, and Pedrinho and Lúcia became adults and "vanished", an aged Emília was still alive and defiant as always, dreaming about switching off the keys of Poverty, Unemployment and Hunger (Brazilian social issues of the present day), and about the Yellow Woodpecker farm itself, their former world of fantasy now possessed by homeless invaders (a reference to the MST). Having a conservative and an anarchist side, Emilia demonstrates being dubious over the movement, divided between adhering and rebelling, while the most recommended person to advise her, her own creator, has already died.

== Personality ==
Emília develops from an ordinary rag doll to an "almost human" doll, as she demonstrates to be abnormally intelligent by insisting on her own ideologies and opinions, even though she insists to pronounce many words in the wrong way, or on her own way.

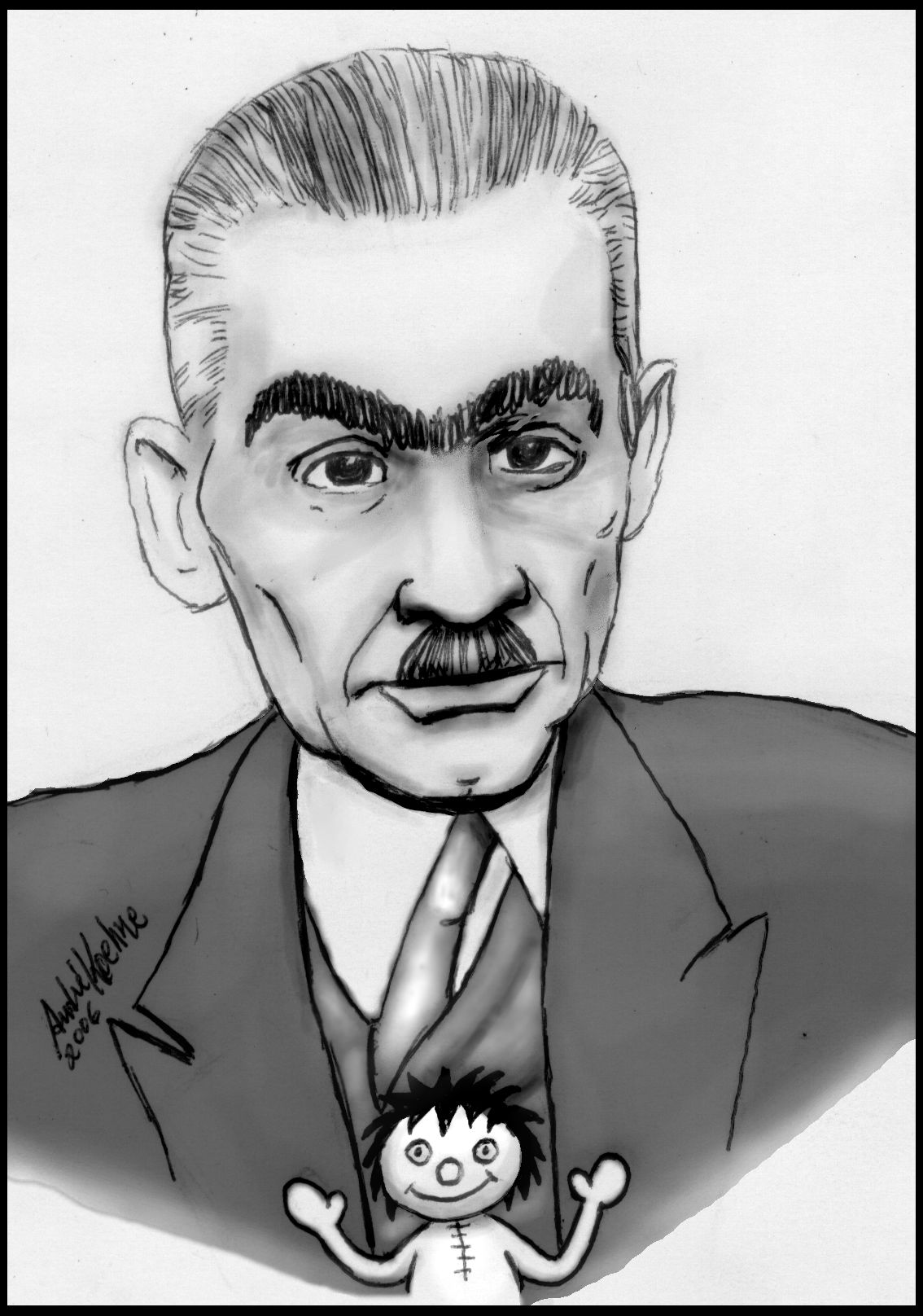
A caricature of Monteiro Lobato with Emília

For example, she prefers to say "liscabão" rather than "beliscão" ("pinch"), and insisted to refer to Doctor Snail as Doctor "Cara-de-coruja" (which is assonant to "caramujo", which is one word for "snail" in Portuguese).

According to herself, Emília is "Independência ou Morte!", a catchphrase she took from Prince Pedro I, who proclaimed the Independence of Brazil. Emília has proven herself to be rogue, rebellious, stubborn, rough and intensely determined. In Histórias Diversas, she attempts to take a group of nymphs to her own by tricking their leader. She also was decided to cut off the wings of a little angel in Memórias de Emília, but fails as the angel manage to escape.

=== Controversy ===
Monteiro Lobato has been criticized for his racist portrayal and treatment of black people in several of his works. This can be noticed in the way Emília refers to Aunt Nastácia (a mulatta), or the way she treats the cook. With the Sítio do Picapau Amarelo novel series, this has been analysed in the way he depicts Aunt Nastácia. In Peter Pan, while Mrs. Benta tells J. M. Berry's novel to her grandsons, Aunt Nastácia complains about "missing pieces" of her own shadow. It is later revealed by the Viscount that Emília was, literally, cutting of the woman's shadow with a scissor, leaving everyone to what the doll simply smiled with superiority, after spending a considerable part of the novel questioning about Nastácia's beliefs and her color.

== In other media ==
Emília's behaviour and physical aspect are intensely softened when the character is adapted into live-action portrayal. A magical subplot was added to the Rede Globo version of the character as, in their version, Emília is able to bring imagination to real only by "pretending". Her ability is constantly desired by the story's antagonists, primally the reptilian evil hag Cuca.

=== Film and television ===
The character as portrayed by Lúcia Lambertini

- Emília was played for the first time by an adult actress, and so would be for the next fifty years. Lúcia Lambertini was cast as Emília in the first television series based on the Sítio novels, produced by TV Tupi. On two occasions, when Lambertini got married and later pregnant, she was replaced by Dulce Margarida. The two actresses then started playing the doll mutually, after Lambertini left São Paulo to continue acting as Emília in Rio de Janeiro.
- After the TV series, O Saci, directed by Rodolfo Nanni, based on the novel of the same name, the second volume of the series, was released in 1953 as a first theatrical film. Child actress Olga Maria plays the doll in the movie.
- Zodja Pereira took the part in the 1967 Rede Bandeirantes' series.
- A second theatrical film, released in 1973, had Leda Zepellin in the role, directed by Geraldo Sarno.
- The most famous portrayal of Emília, as a colorful rag doll with a trademark make-up and patchwork hair, would start in 1977, after actress Dirce Migliaccio was cast as Emília for the first Rede Globo series Sítio do Picapau Amarelo, that is now considered a classic.
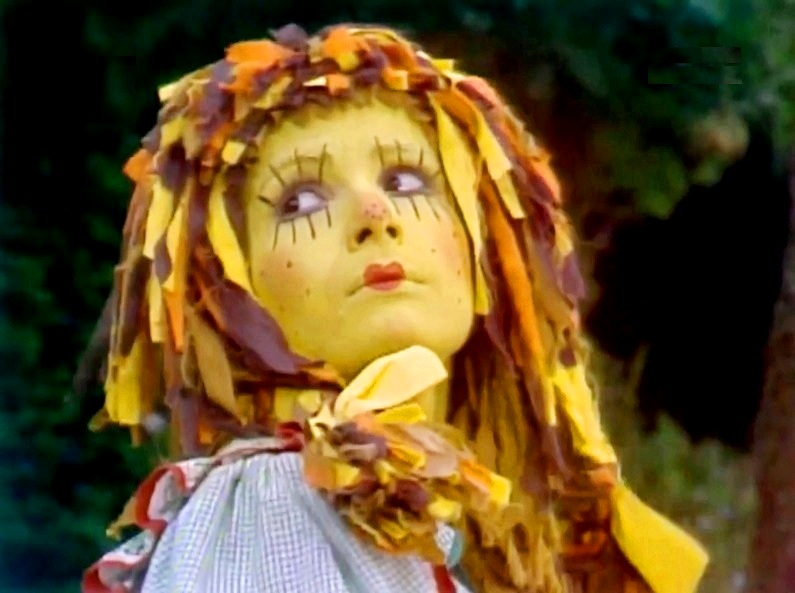
  The character as portrayed by Reny de Oliveira
  In 1978, Migliaccio was replaced by Reny de Oliveira, who left the series in 1982 after not having a positive feedback from the character. Oliveira is notorious for posing nude for Playboy Brasil in order to rid her image from Emília. Suzana Abranches then assumed her place between 1983 and 1986, when the show was then cancelled.
- Sítio do Picapau Amarelo would come back fourteen years later, in 2001, with Isabelle Drummond in the role. Drummond was supposed to read for the part of Lúcia, but choose to read Emília's by herself, being cast at the age of 8. The role debuted her career and became strongly popular in the following years.
  Dirce Migliaccio and Isabelle Drummond as Emília for the 2004 television special Estação Globo
  A Rede Globo television special presented by Drummond as Emília, in 2004, featured a scene where the doll encountered Dirce Migliaccio's character when looking through a mirror, seeing Dirce's Emília as her reflection. In another television special to celebrate Rede Globo's 40th anniversary, Isabelle Drummond (as a girl thar grew up watching the network) was digitally inserted in several programs of Globo, including past versions of Sítio. The actress left the series in 2006.
- Tatyane Goulart replaced Isabelle Drummond in 2007, the final year of the show after its 2001 revival. Sítio was cancelled due to poor ratings in that year.
- In 2012, the 2001 version of Sítio, as well as the novel Reinações de Narizinho, served as the basis for an animated series of same name, which is produced by Globo and Mixer. Isabella Guarnieri voices Emília in the episodes.
- In 2021, SBT aired a prank aimed at children using the characters from Monteiro Lobato's work on the Programa Silvio Santos, with good reception of the pranks between the years 2021 and 2023. In November 2023 SBT announced that SBT Vídeos will be rebranded to +SBT, with the educational children's television series title O Picapau Amarelo. Débora Gomez portrays Emília at the fifteen episodes, while the actress Lindainês Daterling portrays Emília Substantivo Próprio (Proper Noun) at the episode 5.

=== Comics ===
Sítio do Picapau Amarelo became a comic in 1977, published by RGE. The characters later received their own titles, including the doll, with Emília which was published between 1979 and 1980 earning 6 issues.

The 2001 series was brought into the comic book format in 2003, for the national Brazilian anti-hunger campaign Fome Zero, entitled Emília e a Turma do Sítio no Fome Zero. The series generally dealt with nutritional reeducation. Between 2006 and 2008 there was a little return of the Sítio do Picapau Amarelo comics, published by Editora Globo. In 2007 Emília returned to have her title published, and lasted until 2008 earning 12 issues.
