= Sítio do Picapau Amarelo (comics) =

Brazilian comic book series

- Cover of Sítio do Picapau Amarelo #15 (July, 1978)

Publication information
- Publisher: RGE (1977–84); Globo (2006–2008)
- Schedule: Monthly
- Format: Comic book
- Genre: Children; Comedy; Adventure; Fantasy
- Publication date: 1977–1984 (first series); 2006–2008 (second series)
- Main character(s): Emília; Pedrinho; Narizinho; Visconde de Sabugosa; Dona Benta; Tia Nastácia

Sítio do Picapau Amarelo was a Brazilian comic book series based on the eponymous novel series Sítio do Picapau Amarelo by Monteiro Lobato. It was originally released in 1977 on the success of the TV series produced by Rede Globo, comic books were published by the publisher RGE who would later become Editora Globo. It continued to be sold until 1979 when the characters Emília, Pedrinho and Visconde now has their own comics replacing the Sítio do Picapau Amarelo, but the comics only lasted two years being sold, and in 1981 the Sítio do Picapau Amarelo returned to be published. The comics remained being published until 1984, two years before the end of the TV series.

Only in 2006 a new comic series was published, this time with the seal of Editora Globo and being based by the 2001 TV series which was still being broadcast at the time, however, the character designs were adapted from the first seasons. The main reason for his return was due to exit of Monica and Friends to publisher Panini Comics, making them would cover space with other comics like O Menino Maluquinho and Cocoricó. It is derived from other comics as the comics of villain Cuca, the return of the comics Emília, among others. However, since when the TV series was canceled in 2007, as none of them gave good yields all ended up being canceled in early 2008 when Globo was decreed the end of comic book publications.

== Titles ==
Editora RGE

- Sítio do Picapau Amarelo (1977–1979; 1981–1984) - 28 issues (first series), 36 issues (second series)
- Almanaque do Sítio do Picapau Amarelo (1977–1980; 1983) - 8 issues (first series), 2 issues (second series)
- Sítio do Picapau Amarelo Especial (1978–1979) - 3 issues
- Emília (1979–1980) - 6 issues (first series)
- Pedrinho (1979–1980) - 3 issues
- Visconde (1979–1980) - 3 issues

Editora Globo

- Sítio do Picapau Amarelo (2006–2008) - 18 issues (third series)
- Cuca (2006–2008) - 15 issues
- Você Sabia? Sítio do Picapau Amarelo (2006–2008) - 15 issues
- Emília (2007–2008) - 12 issues (second series)

== Reception ==
The original comics published between 1977 and 1986 were praised and became cult classics alongside the live-action series.

The educational comics published in 2003 for the Fome Zero program were considered inferior and without the same charm as the old comics, but were praised for their altruistic intention. Globo's release of the comic in 2006 was also criticized for its lack of originality compared to comics published in the 70s and 80s, since this version chose to use realistic designs closer to the 2001 live-action series instead of opting for an original art style and new designs for the characters just like occurred in previous comics. However, the solo comic focused on Cuca was more praised.
