= O Saci (film) =

1953 film directed by Rodolfo Nanni

- DVD cover
- Directed by: Rodolfo Nanni
- Screenplay by: Rodolfo Nanni
- Story by: Arthur Neves
- Based on: O Saci & Sítio do Picapau Amarelo by Monteiro Lobato
- Produced by: Rodolfo Nanni; Arthur Neves
- Starring: Paulo Matozinho; Olga Maria; Aristéia Paula de Souza; Lívio Nanni; Maria Rosa Ribeiro
- Cinematography: Ruy Santos
- Edited by: José Cañizares
- Music by: Cláudio Santoro
- Production company: Brasiliense Filme
- Distributed by: Unida Filmes
- Release date: 10 September 1953
- Running time: 65 minutes
- Country: Brazil
- Language: Portuguese

O Saci (English: The Saci) is a 1953 Brazilian children-family fantasy film, directed by Rodolfo Nanni, written by Nanni with a story by Arthur Neves, and based on the novel of same name written by Monteiro Lobato. Noted for being the first family film to be ever made in Brazil, it is also the first theatrical Sítio do Picapau Amarelo adaptation. Introducing young actress Olga Maria as Emília and Paulo Matozinho as the title character Saci, it adapts the novel in which Pedrinho (Lívio Nanni) demonstrates interest in capturing the supernatural, one-legged mulatto boy figure, the Saci, inhabiting the nearby virgin forest. In 1954 the film won the Saci Award, that rewarded the best films of the decade.

== Plot ==
At the peaceful Sítio do Picapau Amarelo (Yellow Woodpecker Ranch), two kids, Pedrinho and Lúcia, and Lúcia's talkative and rough doll Emília, attempt to capture the Saci, advised by the wise Uncle Barnabé. After Lúcia is turned into a stone by the demonic, reptilian witch Cuca, the brave and bold Pedrinho starts a journey through the forest with the Saci, in order to make the evil hag bring the girl back.

== Cast ==
- Paulo Matozinho as the Saci - While Monteiro Lobato describes the Saci as a tiny, black gnome or elf in the novel, the film uses the one-legged boy version of the myth.
- Lívio Nanni as Pedrinho
- Aristéia Paula de Souza as Lúcia
- Olga Maria as Emília
- Maria Rosa Ribeiro as Mrs. Benta
- Otávio Araújo as Uncle Barnabé
- Benedita Rodrigues as Aunt Nastácia
- M. Meneguelli as Cuca - The old hag version of the myth replaces the reptilian, demonic aspect look of Cuca, featured in the novel and in every ensuing version of the story.
- Iara von Tressler as Yara (as Yara Trexler)
- Meninos de Ribeirão Bonito as the Sacis

== Production and reception ==
Rodolfo Nanni wrote, produced and directed the film (the very first of the children-family genre in Brazil) at the age of 28, after returning from a cinema-studying season in Paris. His niece Lívio Nanni portrays Pedrinho, following some casting auditions. Extras credited as "Meninos de Ribeirão Bonito" ("Boys from Ribeirão Bonito") portray Saci's younger brothers. Released only four years after the death of author Monteiro Lobato, on 10 September 1953, O Saci was a commercial success and helped to make Lobato's work popular for both children and adults, and especially among illiterate people. The film is still well remembered and had a second premiere at its 60th anniversary, at the Amazonas Film Festival.
