= Tatiana Belinky =

Russian-Brazilian children's writer

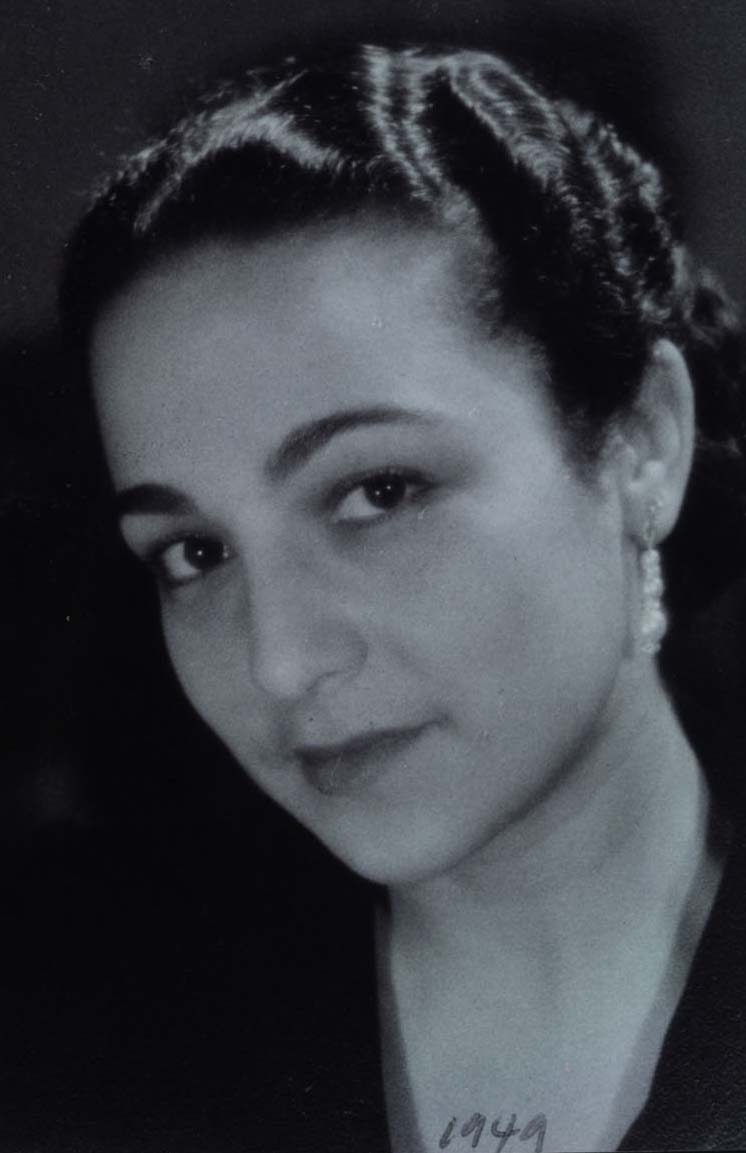
- Born: 18 March 1919; Petrograd, Russia
- Died: 15 June 2013 (aged 94); São Paulo, Brazil
- Occupation: Children's writer
- Spouse: Júlio Gouveia (m. 1940; div. 1988)

Tatiana Belinky (18 March 1919 – 15 June 2013) was a Russian-born Brazilian children's writer. She wrote over 250 books for children.

== Biography ==
Born in Petrograd, Belinky came to Brazil with her family when she was ten years old, fleeing from the civil wars in the then Soviet Union. At eighteen, after completing a preparatory course on Mackenzie University, she began working as a bilingual secretary in Portuguese and English. At twenty she enrolled at the Philosophy course of Faculdade São Bento, but she abandoned it when she married the doctor and educator Júlio Gouveia in 1940. The couple had two sons.

In 1948, Belinky begins adapting, translating, and creating children's plays for São Paulo city government in partnership with her husband. In 1952 they direct the play "The Three Bears" at the request of TV Tupi, which achieves great success. The success of this work was definitive for the budding writer's career: the couple is asked to have a fixed program on the TV network. Inside TV Tupi, Tatiana and Julio make the first version of Monteiro Lobato's Sítio do Pica-pau Amarelo, and also the third version of the series on Band. The couple worked on Tupi until 1966. Meanwhile, Tatiana Belinky receives her first award as a writer, as well as becoming president of CET (São Paulo State Commission for Theatre).

In 1972, she began to work on TV Cultura and in major newspapers of São Paulo, such as Folha de S.Paulo, Jornal da Tarde and O Estado de S. Paulo, writing articles, essays and criticism of children's literature.

Eventually, in 1985, she emerged as a writer of books, collaborating in a children and youth series. In 1987 published the first book, "Limeriques", published by FTD, based on the Irish limericks. From this publication, Tatiana began to work feverishly on new creations, and wrote over a hundred works. Her publications are accompanied by several literary awards, including the renowned Jabuti Prize, received in 1989.

From her vast work stand out "Coral dos Bichos", "Limeriques", "O Grande Rabanete", "Di-versos Russos", "Limerique das Coisas Boas," among others. Lately, the author has also published chronicle books and memoirs. On April 15, 2010, Belinky became a member of the Academia Paulista de Letras.

Tatiana Belinky died at age 94, after 11 days of hospitalization at Hospital Alvorada in São Paulo.

== Filmography ==
=== Television ===
Year	Title	Role	Notes
1952	Os Três Ursos	Main Author	Rede Tupi
1952–1957	Fabulas Animadas	Main Author	Rede Tupi
1952–1963	Sítio do Picapau Amarelo	Main Author	Rede Tupi
1967–1969	Sítio do Picapau Amarelo	Main Author	Band
1991–1992	Mundo da Lua	Screenwriter	TV Cultura
