= Sítio do Pica-pau Amarelo (1952 TV series) =

1952 Brazilian children's television series

- Genre: Children's; Fantasy
- Created by: Tatiana Belinky
- Based on: Sítio do Picapau Amarelo by Monteiro Lobato
- Directed by: Júlio Gouveia
- Starring: Sidnéia Rossi; Suzy Arruda; Leonor Lambertini; Zeni Pereira; Lúcia Lambertini; Lidia Rosemberg; Edy Cerri; Sérgio Rosemberg; Julinho Simões; David José; Rúbens Molino; Luciano Maurício; Júlio Silva; Ricardo Gouveia; Paulo Basco
- Narrated by: Júlio Gouveia
- Opening theme: Dobrado (Salatiel Coelho)
- Ending theme: Dobrado (Salatiel Coelho)
- Country of origin: Brazil
- No. of seasons: 12
- No. of episodes: 360

Production
- Running time: 45 min. each episode

Original release
- Network: Rede Tupi
- Release: 3 June 1952 – 6 March 1963

Related
- Sítio do Picapau Amarelo (1964); Sítio do Picapau Amarelo (1967); Sítio do Picapau Amarelo (1977); Sítio do Picapau Amarelo (2001); Sítio do Picapau Amarelo (2012); O Picapau Amarelo (2024)

Sítio do Pica-pau Amarelo was a 1952 Brazilian children-family television series produced and aired by Rede Tupi, Sítio was scripted by Brazilian author Tatiana Belinky, based on the series of novels of same name. The series is the first live-action adaptation of the Sítio universe. It was the first television adaptation of the homonymous work by Monteiro Lobato.

Sítio tells the story of the peaceful title Sítio, the Yellow Woodpecker Ranch, where its unique dwellers live in fantasy and learning. It starred actress Lúcia Lambertini (occasionally replaced by Dulce Margarida) in the role of Emília, the living, smart and talkative doll of the farm. The Visconde de Sabugosa was played by Rúbens Molino, and Later In 1958 Molino was replaced by Luciano Maurício. The series premiered on 3 June 1952 and ran until 6 March 1963, being cancelled after eleven years of success. The cast needed to re-enact some episodes in 1963 for the show's "reruns", since episodes were originally broadcast live.

== Plot ==
Dona Benta is an old lady who lives far from the big city in Sítio do Picapau Amarelo, the scene of several stories led by her adventurous grandchildren, Pedrinho and Narizinho. There also lives Tia Nastácia, a handy cook who sewed the cloth doll Emília for Narizinho and who, after one of Dr. Caramujo's pills, came to life, showing herself to be a talkative, lively girl who always gets on with the crowd. in trouble. Furthermore, they have the friendship of the Marquês de Rabicó, a greedy and clumsy pig, and the Visconde de Sabugosa, a doll made of corncobs who also came to life and is extremely intelligent. All the stories take place on the balcony of the mansion, where various confusions occur and many characters visit them.

The episode “País da Gramática” was made and shown on November 22, 1961.

== Cast ==
- Sidnéia Rossi as Dona Benta (1952–1953)
- Suzy Arruda as Dona Benta (1954–1957)
- Leonor Lambertini as Dona Benta (1958–1963)
- Zeni Pereira as Tia Nastácia
- Lúcia Lambertini as Emília (Note: In 1955, while Lúcia Lambertini was in Rio de Janeiro recording the Rio de Janeiro version of the series, Dulce Margarida assumed the role of Emília for a few episodes.)
- Lidia Rosemberg as Narizinho (1952–1953)
- Edy Cerri as Narizinho (1954–1963)
- Sérgio Rosemberg as Pedrinho (1952–1953) (Note: Silvio Lefèvre played Pedrinho in the first 5 episodes, but his father removed him from the series because he thought it would harm his studies.)
- Julinho Simões as Pedrinho (1954)
- David José as Pedrinho (1955–1963)
- Rúbens Molino as Visconde de Sabugosa (1952–1957)
- Luciano Maurício as Visconde de Sabugosa (1958–1963)
- Júlio Silva as Marquês de Rabicó (1952-1957)
- Ricardo Gouveia as Marquês de Rabicó (1958-1963)
- Paulo Basco as Dr. Caramujo

== Rio de Janeiro version ==
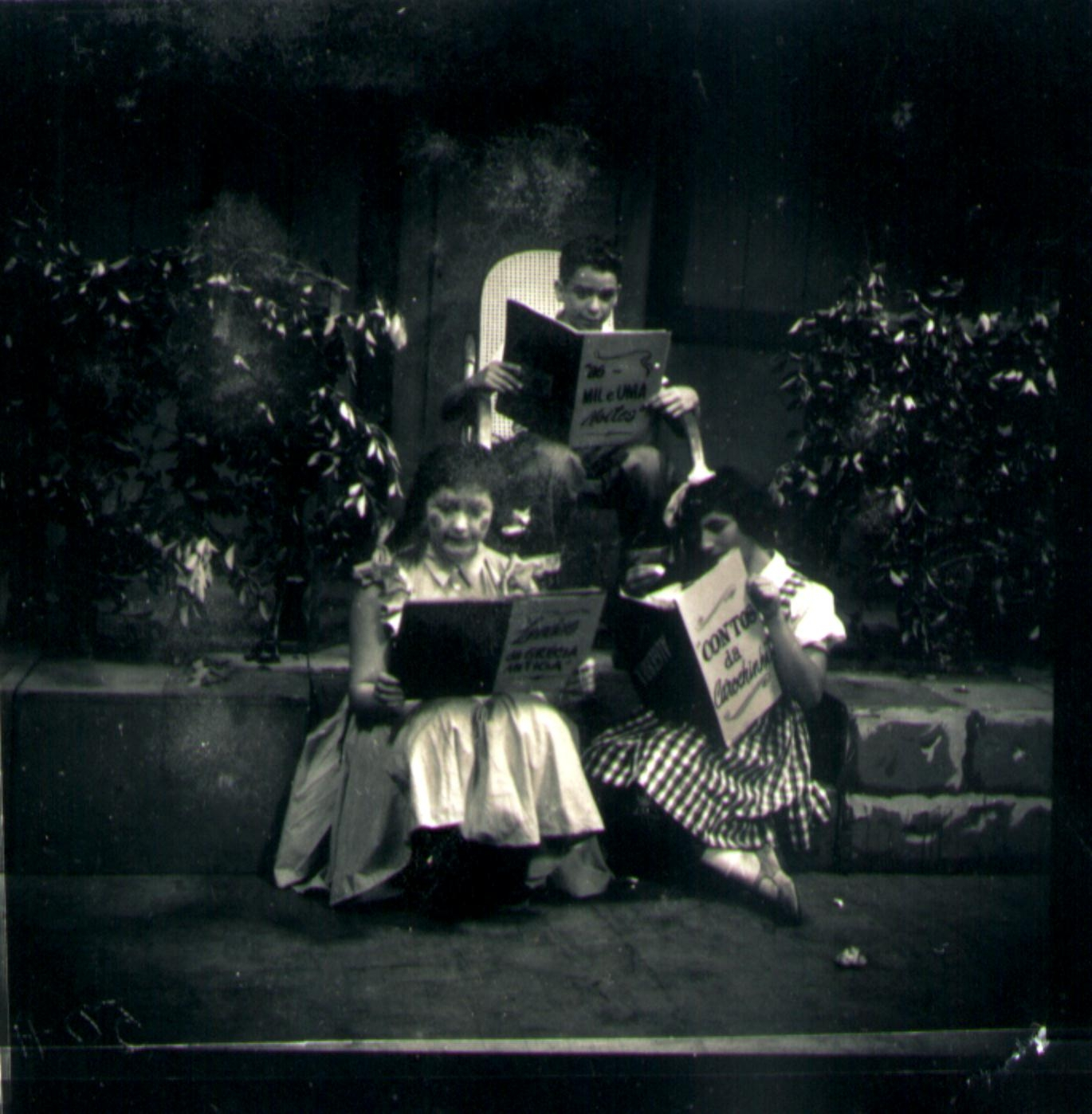
The main trio of the program.

Between 1955 and 1956, as the original program was broadcast only in São Paulo, TV Tupi produced a version at its headquarters in Rio de Janeiro with a different cast. Only Lúcia Lambertini remained in the same role, traveling weekly to appear in both versions.

- Iná Malagutti as Dona Benta (1955)
- Wanda A. Hammel as Dona Benta (1956)
- Benedita Rodrigues as Tia Nastácia
- Lúcia Lambertini as Emília
- Leny Vieira as Narizinho
- André José Adler as Pedrinho
- Elísio de Albuquerque as Visconde de Sabugosa
- Fininho as Marquês de Rabicó
- Daniel Filho as Dr. Caramujo

== Production ==
The idea was first conceived by Tatiana Belinky's husband, psychiatrist Júlio Gouveia, after he asked some adults, at a children's birthday party, to improvise a stage play version of Peter Pan for their present and bored kids. This led him to write a thesis about children's theatre and its role on the youngers' education. His article impressed TV Tupi, the only television network in Brazil at that time. He was then hired by the channel and decided to adapt Monteiro Lobato's fantasy series of novels for the teleplay, and the pilot was broadcast live as a single presentation. The good rating forced Tupi to create a television series, with Júlio Gouveia's wife Tatiana Belinky as the screenwriter. Despite Sítio's immediate repercussion, the budget was extremely limited and only one set (the ranch's gazebo) was available. Other sets required by the script would be hastily handmade by the crew. Since special effects were non-existent, the fantasy was highly improvised with available resources. For example, for the underwater scenes at the Reino das Águas Claras (Kingdom of Clear Waters), Tatiana Belinky put her own fish bowl in front of the camera. Salatiel Coelho's song "Dobrado" was the series' opening theme before Gilberto Gil composed the famous Sítio do Picapau Amarelo main title theme for Rede Globo's posterior versions.

The series was shown on Thursdays at 7:30 pm live, as there were no recording techniques yet for television. The scenes took place mostly in a single fixed setting, the balcony of the farm, since television in Brazil had only existed for a year and resources at the time were still precarious and simple. Scenes in different locations, such as in the woods or in the kitchen, were set up on specific days and the characters moved there abruptly. The stories had no interruption for the commercial break and, therefore, during the dialogues or scenes with the fixed actors, product announcements were introduced. The episodes began with images of Júlio Gouveia opening a book to tell a story. In the end, the episode ended with Júlio closing the Book.

== Soundtrack ==
Sítio do Pica-pau Amarelo

Soundtrack album by Various Artists
- Released: 1954
- Genre: Children's music
- Label: Odeon Records
- Director: Júlio Gouveia

The LP with two stories and the double single from the Brazilian series Sítio do Picapau Amarelo, released in 1954 by Odeon Records.

=== Tracks ===
- A Pílula Falante
- O Casamento da Emília
