= Sítio do Picapau Amarelo (video game) =

1997 video game

Sítio do Picapau Amarelo Yellow Woodpecker Ranch
- Developer: Tec Toy
- Publisher: Tec Toy
- Platform: Master System
- Release: BRA: 1997
- Genre: Platform
- Mode: Single-player

Sítio do Picapau Amarelo, is a 1997 platform game developed by Tec Toy for the Master System. It is based on the eponymous series broadcast in the 1970s and 1980s, which in turn was based on the novel series by Monteiro Lobato. As Férias Frustradas do Pica-Pau it was released in Brazil only. Featuring characters design by a Brazilian comics artist Ely Barbosa.

== Gameplay ==
The player chooses whether to play Pedrinho (Pete) or Emília (Emilia) in the game. Both should go the way jumping on platforms and defeating enemies throwing objects on them, Pedrinho with a slingshot and Emília only stones. Throughout the game they lose points lives they can restore freeing caged birds along the way. However it has a very heavy control that impedes the player to give high jumps.

== Plot ==
When the cook Tia Nastácia (Aunt Anastacia) gets sick, Pedrinho and Emília receive a mission to find the 5 ingredients to be able to cure her, venturing through forests found with creatures of folklore.

== Reception ==
Tom Bowen for Game Rant ranked it the tenth best Brazilian exclusive for the Master System.
