= Fundamentos =

Cultural and literary magazine in Brazil (1947–1991)

- Categories: Cultural magazine; Literary magazine
- Founder: Monteiro Lobato
- Founded: 1948
- Final issue: 1955
- Country: Brazil
- Based in: São Paulo
- Language: Portuguese

Fundamentos (Portuguese: Foundations) was a cultural and literary magazine published in São Paulo, Brazil, from 1948 to 1955. The magazine was close to the Brazilian Communist Party.

Fundamentos was established in 1948. The founder was Monteiro Lobato. The magazine was the organ of the Brazilian Communist Party and covered cultural and literary articles. The headquarters of the magazine was in São Paulo. Former Brazilian President Fernando Henrique Cardoso joined the editorial council of the magazine in 1952. Fundamentos ceased publication in 1955.
