= Tatyane Goulart =

Brazilian actress (born 1983)

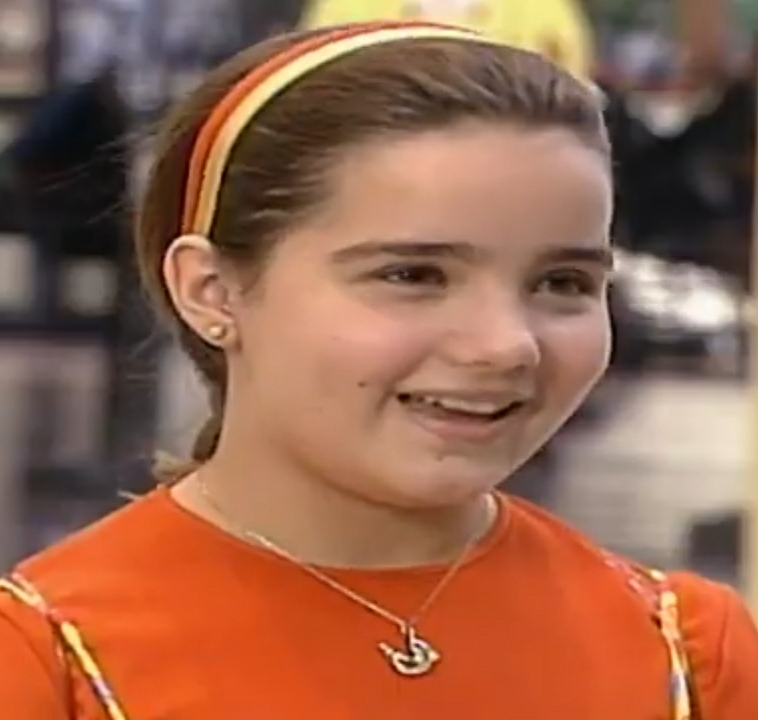
- Goulart in 1996
- Born: Tatyane Fontinhas Goulart; 18 October 1983 (age 41); Rio de Janeiro, Brazil
- Occupation: Actress
- Years active: 1991–present
- Spouse: Caio Veronese (2009–2016)

Tatyane Fontinhas Goulart (18 October 1983, in Rio de Janeiro) is a Brazilian actress.

== Career ==
Goulart debuted in 1991, working for seven years in the telenovela Felicidade, in the role of Bia.

She portrayed Ângela in Quatro por Quatro, and the last Emilia in the Sítio do Picapau Amarelo, replacing Isabelle Drummond, and Vanessa in the series Cinquentinha. In 2013, she returned to the big screen in Pecado Mortal.

In 2017, she debuted on stage with the play O Grande Amor da Minha Vida, next to Marcello Melo Jr.

== Filmography ==
=== Television ===
Year	Title	Role	Notes
1991	Felicidade	Beatriz de Sousa Peixoto (Bia)	
1992	Perigosas Peruas	Marília	Participation
1992	Você Decide		Episódio: "Testemunha Ocular"
1993	O Mapa da Mina	Carolina Torres de Almeida	
1994	Você Decide		Episode: "O Transplante"
1994	Quatro por Quatro	Ângela Sales Herrera Franco	
1995	Você Decide		Episode: "Namoro Adolescente"
1996	Você Decide		Episode: "Tempo de Namoro"
1996	Você Decide		Episode: "Não Se Esqueça de Mim"
1996	Malhação	Fátima Maria	Participation
1997	Você Decide		Episode: "A Vizinha"
1998	Sandy & Junior Especial	Betina	Episode: "Pilot"
1998–99	Globo Ciência	Presenter	
2000	Uga-Uga	Lilith Guerra Pomeranz	
2003	Kubanacan	Mercedita Pantaleón Camacho	
2004	Senhora do Destino	Alessandra / supposed Lindalva	Support cast
2005	Sob Nova Direção	Dani	Episode: "A Escola Sem Fim"
2007	Sítio do Picapau Amarelo	Emilia	Season 7
2008	Casos e Acasos	Bel	Episode: "O Concurso, o Vestido e a Paternidade"
2008	Guerra e Paz	Alice	Episode: "Pedro & Bina"
2009	TV Globinho	Presenter	Season 10
2009	Cinquentinha	Vanessa de Carvalho	
2013	Pecado Mortal	Lívia Vêneto	
