= Capelobo =

Mythical creature from Brazilian mythology

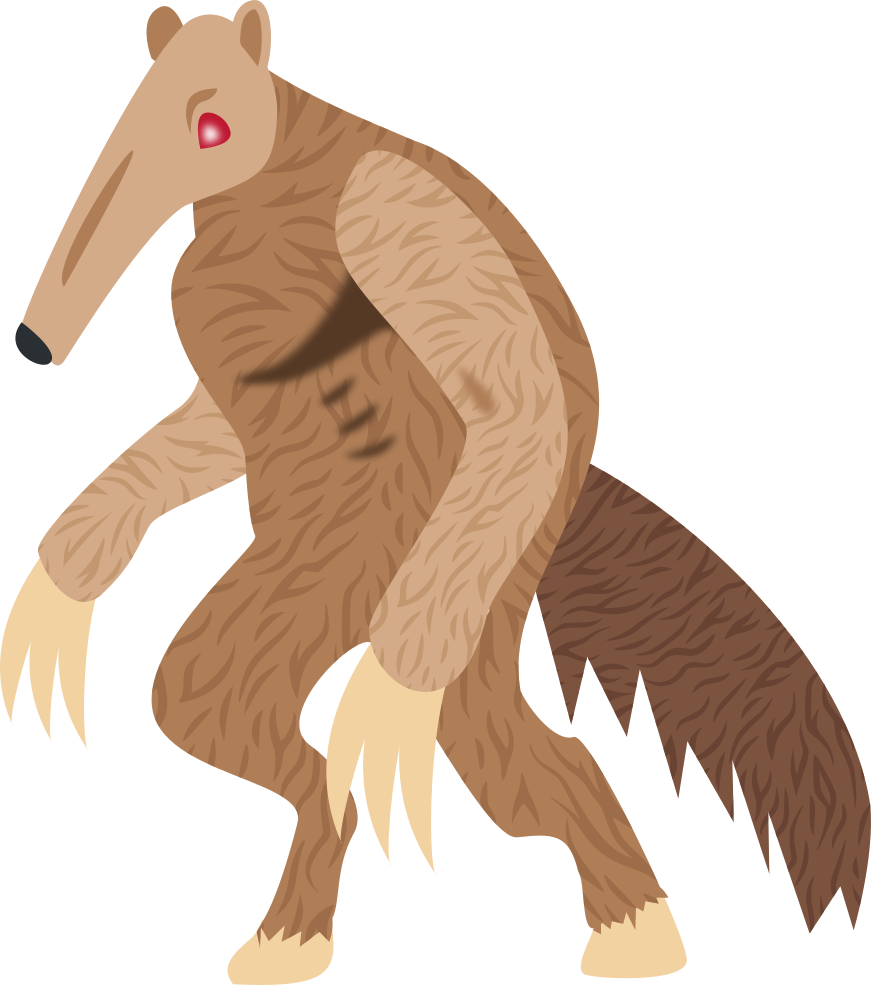
- An illustration of a Capelobo

Creature information
- Grouping: Monster
- Similar entities: Vampires, Werewolves

Origin
- Country: Brazil
- Habitat: Floodplains

The Capelobo is a therianthropic creature from Brazilian mythology, with an elongated snout of a pig, dog, or giant anteater, depending on region, as the legend is locally told in the states of Pará or Maranhão.

It is either beast-like or humanoid like a Mapinguari and stumpy-footed as well, though lacking a giant mouth. It is feared as a man-eater, more specifically a blood-sucker and brain-eater. It is known for its screaming. Its only vulnerable spot is at the navel.

== Etymology ==
The name Capelobo is a fusion of Guarani capê meaning "broken boned", "crooked", "crook-legged", or "lame" and the Portuguese word lobo, meaning wolf.

== Legend ==
The legend is locally told in the states of Pará or Maranhão, but scarcely heard of from the Amazon, and known mostly to the so-called "tame" indío population, and not known among the mixed-race people.

=== Description ===
In the version which is widely popular in the Xingu River basin, Pará, the Capelobo has two forms, an animal form and a humanoid form. In its animal form, it resembles a long, black haired and dog- or pig-snouted tapir with round paws. As for its humanoid form, there is an underlying belief that every índio of great age will transform into this monster, and the storytellers specifically describe the Capelobo as resembling a Mapinguari (monster into which very old índio men were feared to transform into (Note: Francisco Peres de Lima (1938) Folclore acreano, p. 103 describes the Mapinguari in Acre (state) as: " " ... êste animal deriva-se dos índios que alcançam uma idade avançada, transformando-se em um monstro..", etc.)) or a Quibungo (monster which old black men turned into (Note: Cascudo (1983), p. 205: "Quibungo, Negro africano, quando fica muito velho, vira Quibungo. É um macacão todo peludo, que come crianças. (Recôncavo da Bahia)" citing da Silva Campos, João (1928) “Contos e Fábulas populares da Bahia”, in O Folclore no Brasil, p. 219.)) but without their anomalous gaping mouths that run from nose to stomach.

The version in Maranhão (apparently surviving in the forests of the Pindaré River basin if nowhere else) is called Cupelobo (cupélobo) and reputed to have the snout of a giant anteater. There is a difference of opinion about the anteater-headed version, whether it has a shaggy manlike body or a (shaggy) tapir-like body. The anteater-headed, shaggy human bodied one also had round feet like the "bottom of a bottle" which left foot-tracks of such round shape. (Note: From a Timbira storyteller, second-hand via a Canela informant in the village of Ponto.) Thus it has been confounded with the Pé de Garrafa (lit. "bottle-leg"; a mythic round-footed creature which in some accounts is one-legged). (Note: In Abreu's account the native informants never explicitly reported the creature as one-legged. Nevertheless, Casudo's Geografica (1983) [1952] interpreted Cupelobo to be a one-legged ("unipedal") creature in this account. But Cascudo's later work, Dicionário (1983) [1954] merely draws comparison with Pé de Garrafa, which will be followed here. Franchini also assumed Cupelobo to be one-legged, and compared it to the saci.)

The Capelobo is described as a hematophage (blood-sucker) and likened to the werewolf Lobisomem (or considered a sub-variant thereof). It is also known to snatch away newborn puppies and kittens from people's huts or encampments ensconced in the forest, roaming in the dead of night, like a Lobisomen. It reputedly "crushes [the victim] with a deadly embrace", otherwise breaks open the carotid artery to drink the victim's blood, or inserts its snout or trunk into the embraced victim's head and sucks out the brain, its favorite food.

The only way to defeat it is by shooting it in the navel, which is covered in long strands of fur, and the natives hesitate to take arrow shots at it.

The Capelobo does a lot of screaming to announce its presence, like the Mapinguari and the Pé de Garrafa.

The lore of the cupélobo is also known to the Guajajáras people.

== See also ==
- List of vampiric creatures in folklore
- Cumacanga - flame-headed monster, equatable to capelobo
