= Sítio do Picapau Amarelo (novel series) =

Children's literature series by Monteiro Lobato

- Reinações de Narizinho (1931); O Saci (1921); Caçadas de Pedrinho (1933); Memórias da Emília (1936); Emília no País da Gramática (1934); Aritmética da Emília (1935); Fábulas (1922); Histórias Diversas (1947); Histórias da Tia Nastácia (1937); Peter Pan (1930); Viagem ao Céu (1932); O Poço do Visconde (1937); O Picapau Amarelo (1939); As Aventuras de Hans Staden (1927); Dom Quixote das Crianças (1936); Geografia de Dona Benta (1935); A Chave do Tamanho (1942); A Reforma da Natureza (1941); O Minotauro (1939); Os Doze Trabalhos de Hércules (1944); História do Mundo para as Crianças (1933); Serões de Dona Benta (1937); História das Invenções (1935)
- Author: Monteiro Lobato
- Language: Portuguese
- Genre: Fantasy; Children's literature
- Publisher: Various (originally Editora Monteiro Lobato & Cia)
- Published: December 1920 – 1947
- Media type: Print (hardcover and paperback)
- No. of books: 23

Sítio do Picapau Amarelo (literally translated and roughly known as "The Yellow Woodpecker Farm'" or "The Yellow Woodpecker Ranch") is a series of 23 fantasy novels written by Brazilian author Monteiro Lobato between 1920 and 1940. The series is considered representative of Brazilian children's literature and as the Brazilian equivalent to children's classics such as C. S. Lewis' The Chronicles of Narnia and L. Frank Baum's The Wonderful Wizard of Oz series. Lobato's single original adult fiction, a sci-fi novel entitled O Presidente Negro ("The Black President") set in the far future, would not achieve the same popularity of Sítio. The concept was introduced in Monteiro Lobato's 1920 novel A Menina do Narizinho Arrebitado, considered the first Brazilian children's book and, was later republished as the first chapter of Reinações de Narizinho 1931, which is the first novel of the actual Sítio series. The main setting is Sítio do Picapau Amarelo, where a boy, a girl and their living and thinking toys enjoy exploring adventures in fantasy, discovery and learning. On several occasions, they leave the ranch to explore other worlds such as Neverland, the mythological Ancient Greece, an underwater world known as the Clear Waters Kingdom, and outer space. Sítio is often symbolized by the character of Emília, Lobato's most famous creation alongside Jeca Tatu.

All the Sítio volumes have been published in other countries, including Russia (as Орден Жёлтого Дятла) and Argentina (as "La Finca del Benteveo Amarillo"). While this two have the whole series translated and adapted, the single volume Reinações de Narizinho was published in Italy, as Nasino. Sítio do Picapau Amarelo has never been translated to English, even though Monteiro Lobato also worked as a translator for numerous foreign novels to Portuguese, such as Tarzan of the Apes, Alice's Adventures in Wonderland and the two Pollyanna novels.

Sítio has also been adapted into two feature films in the 1950s and 1970s and several television series, the most popular being Rede Globo's 1977-1986 and 2001-2007 productions. In 2012, an animated series was produced by Rede Globo and Mixer, visually based on the 2001 version.

Globo retained the rights of Sítio do Picapau Amarelo and published the books through its publishing division Editora Globo. In January 2019, the rights of all Monteiro Lobato's works entered into public domain in Brazil.

== Background and conception ==
In 1920, while in a chess match, Lobato's friend Toledo Malta told him the story of a fish that drowned after spending too much time away from the water. The idea became fixed in Lobato's mind, forcing him to write a short tale entitled A História do Peixinho Que Morreu Afogado ("The Tale of The Fish that Drowned to Death"), now reported as lost. This tale inspired A Menina do Narizinho Arrebitado ("The Girl with the Upturned Nose"), published in Christmas 1920.

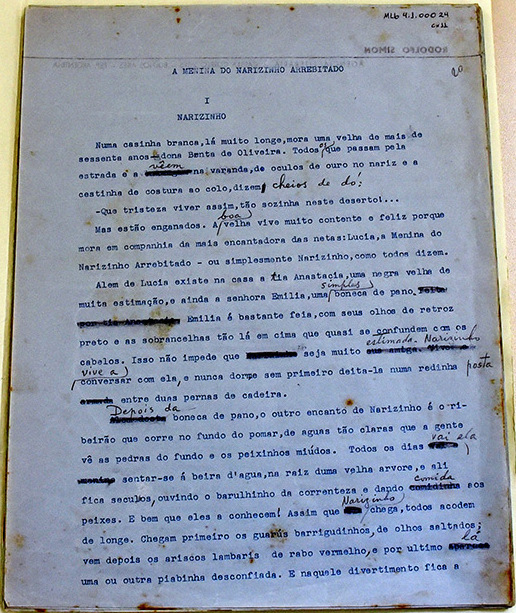
First page from A Menina with corrections by Lobato.

A Menina introduced the title character Lúcia "Little Nose" and her rag doll Emília (Lobato's most popular creation alongside Jeca Tatu). A Menina was later republished, in the following year, as the first chapter of Reinações de Narizinho ("The Adventures of Lúcia Little Nose"), that introduced the other major characters Pedrinho and the Viscount of Sabugosa, and provided an expanded vision of the Sítio universe. For the ranch setting, Lobato was inspired by memories of his childhood, living in a São Paulo countryside farm with his family. In the characters, Lobato set his own childhood personality and family characteristics. His grandfather, the Viscount of Tremembé, was an inspiration for the corncob-made Viscount of Sabugosa, as Emília features his "stubborn", "bossy" young behaviour.

A Chave do Tamanho and A Reforma da Natureza are original novels featuring Lobato's trademark creation, the character of Emília, intervening in reality and changing the world according to her will. Monteiro Lobato borrowed several stories from the public domain and inserted them in his work. In the novel Peter Pan, Mrs Benta tells her grandsons J. M. Barrie's novel of same name, which she reads in English before deciding to narrate it on her own way. In addition to the fantasy narrative, the series is known for its didactical role on young readers. Several volumes feature the farm characters literally exploring the worlds of Arithmetic and Grammar; História do Mundo para Crianças provides an overview on the history of mankind for young readers, as it is told by Mrs Benta to her grandchildren. In Geografia and Serões de Dona Benta, the old lady teaches Geography and Physical chemistry general concepts.

== Main characters ==
The major characters illustrated by Manoel Victor Filho, for the Editora Brasiliense editions. From left to right, the corncob Viscount, the rag doll Emília, Lúcia ("Narizinho"), Pedrinho, Aunt Nastácia and Mrs Benta. In the background, the rhinoceros Quindim.

- Lúcia "Narizinho" (Lucia "Little Nose") - A 7-year-old girl with a turned-up nose is Benta's granddaughter and Pedrinho's cousin. She is an orphan and lives on the farm with her grandmother.
- Pedrinho (Pete) - A 9-year-old boy is Benta's grandson and Lucia's cousin. He's a courageous and boy who's keen on adventures. He lives in a big city, and spends his holidays at Mrs Benta's Farm.
- Emília (Emilia) - Lucia's anthropomorphic rag doll, a gift she received from Nastácia. Emilia is able to talk through some of Doctor Snail's "Talking Pills". She is very opinionated and headstrong. Emilia has the power to change reality at will with her imagination.
- Dona Benta (Mrs. Benta) - The farm's owner and most frequent 'storyteller'.
- Tia Nastácia (Aunt Nastasia) - Benta's housemaid and cook. She's a middle-aged black woman who knows a lot of folk tales and is superstitious.
- Visconde de Sabugosa (Viscount of Corncob) - A puppet made of a corncob, with a high IQ, a love for sciences and a tendency to be over-polite. His ability to talk is never fully explained.
- Marquês de Rabicó (Marquis of Short-Tail) - A gluttonous and lazy pig.
- Conselheiro (Advisor) - An old donkey who was taught how to read by the Viscount and now is an eager reader and has developed a wise personality.
- Quindim (Custard Candy) - A rhinoceros who fled from a circus and was hidden by the children. He teaches them how to speak English which he learned by hearing the British while he was in his homeland, Uganda and is usually quite cowardly.
- Tio Barnabé (Uncle Barnaby) - An old black man who knows a lot about folk superstitions and works at Mrs Benta's farm.
- Coronel Teodorico (Colonel Theodoric) - Was a witness at Dona Benta's wedding and is still her best friend. He often visits and has a cup of coffee with her.
- Elias - A trader and merchant who owns a grocery store in the village.
- Iara - A river mermaid spirit, that seduces and bewitches men with her singing.
- Saci-Pererê - a one-legged trickster elf.
- Cuca - A witch in an alligator's body.

== Volumes ==
- Reinações de Narizinho ("The Adventures of Lúcia Little Nose"), published in 1931 with A Menina do Narizinho Arrebitado as its first chapter. In 2012, A Menina was released for the iPad format.
- Viagem ao Céu ("Voyage to the Sky"). Pedrinho befriends an invisible magic being nicknamed Feather, which he has to wear in the head so people can disguise where he is. This being travels to any place, time, or fictional world a powerful magic powder, the Pirlimpimpim, and Pedrinho finds himself in possession of some as Feather forgets (or intentionally leaves) his knapsack on Pedrinho's bed. Using the powder, Pedrinho and the others take a trip through the Solar System and learn a lot about the planets and get to meet several mythical beings.
- O Saci ("The Saci"). Pedrinho learns from an old man, uncle Barnabé, how to attract and entrap the mythical gnome Saci, who enjoys playing pranks on farms. After the demonic witch Cuca curses Lúcia, Pedrinho spends a night in the virgin forest with Saci, in order to make the witch bring the girl back. The boy avoids the frightening supernatural beings that inhabit the place, such as the Werewolf (or Lobisomem), the Headless Mule and the Boitatá.
- Caçadas de Pedrinho ("Pedrinho's Hunts"). Pedrinho hunts down a jaguar and the family is forced to escape from a jamboree of other jaguars that threaten the ranch. In the meantime, a tender rhinoceros escapes from a circus, is found and hid by Emilia the doll. Pedrinho is asked to help find him but is eventually beaten by the doll's greater intelligence and strong persistence.
- Aventuras de Hans Staden ("The Adventures of Hans Staden"). The tale of the 16th-century German sailor who survived a shipwreck but was taken as hostage by the Tupinamba Indians for two years is told by Mrs Benta to her grandsons over a fortnight of evening meals.
- História do Mundo Para Crianças ("History of the World for Children"). The best-seller volume of the series, and a favourite of Brazilian historians for its contribution in children's learning. A general vision of history is taught as a series of causos (folk stories) told by Mrs Benta to her grandsons.
- Memórias da Emília ("Emilia's Memoirs"). Emília takes the Viscount as her personal secretary and starts to write about her life. As she is still young, she exaggerates, which makes every previous story seem different. Meanwhile, a group of English children arrive at the ranch, curious to see the Angel with the Broken Wing.
- Emília no País da Gramática ("Emilia in the Land of Grammar"). The children come to Grammar Country, where each language has a city and, guided by the bookworm rhinoceros, Quindim, learn spelling, linguistics, the use of dictionaries, and syntax.
- Aritmética da Emília ("Emilia's Math Book"). Teaches the basics of Arithmetics and Algebra.
- Geografia de Dona Benta ("Mrs Benta's Geography"). The children are taken by Mrs Benta on a world cruise on board the ship "Terror dos Mares" ("Terror of the Seas"). Lobato describes how the United States and Japan managed to become developed nations quite recently (with the hope that the readers, when adult, would implement the same policies in Brazil).
- Serões de Dona Benta ("Night Chatting With Mrs Benta"). Mrs Benta helps Pedrinho learn Physics.
- História das Invenções ("The History of Inventions"). The children become curious to know "how things were invented" and Mrs Benta teaches them. The novel groups inventions according to the part of the body they supposedly "extend" and narrates the lives of famous inventors, like Santos-Dumont, the Wright Brothers, Thomas Edison and Guglielmo Marconi.
- Histórias de Tia Nastácia ("Aunt Nastácia's Tales"). Aunt Nastácia narrates Brazilian folk tales to the children.
- O Picapau Amarelo ("The Yellow Woodpecker"). The characters of the fables, fairy tales, greek mythology, one thousand and one nights, Neverland, wonderland and Don Quixote decide to move into Mrs Benta's farm.
- A Reforma da Natureza ("Reforming Nature"). Emilia and the Viscount dabble in genetics, anatomy and endocrinology and eventually create monsters, including a giant flea and a giant legged earthworm. Emilia takes advantage of Mrs Benta visiting a cousin, and transforms plants and animals found at the Farm. Mrs Benta returns and find things beyond recognition.
- O Minotauro ("The Minotaur"). After the disappearance of Nastácia in "O Picapau Amarelo", everybody goes to mythical Ancient Greece, in a journey to rescue the woman from the Minotaur.
- A Chave do Tamanho ("The Size Switch"). Furious with the rampant war World War II, Emilia plans to go to the "House of Keys", at the end of the world, and switch war off. However, she makes a mistake and switches off the size of humans, which causes all mankind to become two inches high. In the aftermath of the change, while the world leaders try to keep war going, common people try to organise themselves to survive against threats like rainfall, stray cats & dogs, closed doors, mice and roaches. Despite the huge number of deaths (mostly of people who cannot adapt to change), Lobato depicts a world that is possibly happier 'little' than it was 'big'.
- Fábulas ("Fables"). Aesop's and La Fontaine's fables are told by Mrs Benta and 'commented on' by the children. Emília is pitiless in her review of the fables, ranging from sardonic irony to 'blearrgh'.
- Os Doze Trabalhos de Hércules ("The Twelve Labors of Hercules"). The twelve labors are told with intervention by the children.
- Peter Pan ("The Story of Peter Pan"). Mrs Benta narrates the J. M. Barrie's story of Peter Pan for her grandchildren.
- Dom Quixote das Crianças ("Don Quixote for Children"). The story of Don Quixote de la Mancha told for children.
- O Poço do Visconde ("The Viscount's Well"). The Viscount, Emilia and the children go in the search for petroleum at the Farm.
- Histórias Diversas ("Diverse Stories"). A collection of short tales set in the farm like "As botas de sete léguas" ("The Seven-Leagues Boots"), "A rainha Mabe" ("The Queen Mabe"), "A violeta orgulhosa" ("The Proud Violet"), "O periscópio" ("The Periscope"), "A segunda jaca" ("The Second Jackfruit"), "A lampréia" ("The Lamprey"), "Lagartas e borboletas" ("Caterpillars and Butterflies"), "As fadas" ("The Fairies"), "A reinação atômica" ("The Atomic Adventures"), "As ninfas de Emília" (The Emilia's Nymphs"), "O centaurinho" ("The Little Centaur"), "Uma pequena fada" ("A Little Pixie"), "Conto argentino" ("Argentine Tale"), "O museu da Emília" ("Emilia's Museum"). Several of this stories were intended to become novels but the author died and others are stories that have never been shown in the books by Monteiro Lobato. It features the stage play "O Museu da Emília" ("Emilia's Museum"), which was specially written by Monteiro Lobato to be presented at a school in São Paulo, in 1938.

Lobato's books are in the Brazilian Public Domain, since January 1, 2019. In the US, all the works released before 1924 are already in Public Domain.

== Tie-ins ==
Emília, the Viscount and Mrs Benta, are featured in a biographical novel written by Brazilian author Luciana Sandrini, Minhas Memórias de Lobato ("My Lobato Memories"). The story is similar to Memórias de Emília, but instead the doll writes about her creator, once again with the "help" of the Viscount. Mrs Benta then tells them his story, detailing his entire life, from childhood to his final years.

Author Moacyr Scliar wrote a short story, Por Onde Anda Emília? ("Whatever Happened to Emilia?"), in which he suggests the fates of the doll and her family after several years have passed. Mrs Benta and Aunt Nastácia have died, Rabicó has been turned into ham, and Pedrinho and Lúcia have become adults and 'vanish'. An aged Emília is still alive and defiant as always, dreaming about switching off the keys of Poverty, Unemployment and Hunger (Brazilian social issues of the present day). The Yellow Woodpecker farm itself, their former world of fantasy is now possessed by homeless invaders (a reference to the MST). Having a conservative and an anarchist side, Emilia demonstrates being dubious over the movement, divided between adhering and go against it, while the most recommended person to advise her, her own creator, has already died. Scliar, however, makes no mention of the Viscount.

== Criticism ==
=== Creationism and evolutionism ===
According to Luciana Sandrini's biography Minhas Memórias de Lobato, the novels were banned from several Catholic schools due to their evolutionist nature. In 1942, a nun required all her students to burn their Sítio books in a bonfire.

=== Accusations of racism ===
Monteiro Lobato, after his death, has been accused of racism due to the portrayal and treatment of black people in several of his works. In 2010 a Brazilian educator attempted to legally ban Caçadas de Pedrinho from Brazilian junior schools for the prejudiced narrative and terms contained in the novel. For example, Lobato describes Aunt Nastácia (a mulatta), climbing up "the pole of Saint Pedro as an old monkey", and that "no one would escape" the jaguars attack, "neither Aunt Nastácia, of black flesh."

An academic analysis made by the Instituto de Pesquisas e Estudos Sociais at the Rio de Janeiro State University reportedly has proven that Monteiro Lobato was a "dangerously influential racist working on the scholastic area", and cites a letter Lobato sent to Toledo Neiva, in which he complains about "a country [Brazil] where black men don't have strength enough to organize a Ku Klux Klan", and comparing it to the United States by mentioning André Siegfried, "glad that they're not a second Brazil. Some day, justice will be done to the Ku Klux Klan." On the other hand, Ana Paula de Sousa Formighieri noticed the impossibility to even check if that letter existed in reality. On the eugenics topic, researcher José Wellington de Souza notices that Lobato never supported the Nazi-style eugenics, but only what would be called nowadays public health policies: vaccination, sanitation and so on.

On the other hand, University of São Paulo researcher Vanete Santana-Dezmann, in her article Contradictions in analyses of Monteiro Lobato's children's work ("Contradições em análises da obra infantil de Monteiro Lobato"), notes how Brazilian children's literature at the beginning of the 20th century was extremely racist, but Lobato sought to subvert this fact by creating a narrative in which Aunt Nastácia had the same importance as dona Benta (A Reforma da Natureza), and also dedicated two volumes of his work to traditional folk tales (O Saci and Histórias da Tia Nastácia), as well as noting that the voice of a character doesn't always represent the voice of the author, especially when the work contains characters who contradict each other. The researcher also notes that Uncle Barnabé is also represented in a non-stereotypical way, and the author's deconstruction of the "black-white" dichotomy in fairy tales.

As for the use of certain terms, the researcher notes that Lobato uses them to get closer to the readers of the time, even using a dose of irony and that, if the author didn't specify Aunt Nastacia's ethnicity, her position of equality with Dona Benta would lead readers to understand that she was a white person. And that, by dialoguing with the literary tradition of the time, Lobato causes a rupture, mainly by making Emília, whenever she offends her creator, end up being reprimanded, both by the characters and by the readers. The researcher also notes that the reprimands Emília undergoes make it impossible for her to be the author's main "alter ego". Also, the elements that today are considered racist are an intertextuality with children's literature that has already fallen into oblivion. As for the work Caçadas de Pedrinho, the researcher notes that Lobato uses the term "monkey" in reference to various characters, always when explaining their physical prowess in comparison to the ape (at one point, Narizinho is described in this way after jumping on a slippery rock without falling), not as a derogatory comment.

== Other media ==
=== Films and television ===
The series was first adapted into a live-action production for television in 1952, Sítio do Picapau Amarelo as a television series that produced by TV Tupi, and later in 1964 the series produced by TV Cultura. In 1953 Sítio becomes a theatrical film O Saci, based on the novel of same name, and was directed by Rodolfo Nanni. It introduced child actress Olga Maria in the role of Emília. In 1967, a new series premiered on Rede Bandeirantes. A second movie, O Picapau Amarelo, was released in 1973, directed by Geraldo Sarno and based on the novel of same name. Rede Globo bought the rights and started producing Sítio do Picapau Amarelo in 1977. The series ran for ten years until it was canceled in 1986. After the first Rede Globo series ended, playwright Cíntia Abravanel, daughter of Brazilian TV host Silvio Santos, bought Sítio's rights with the intention of adapting the series to her father's network SBT. However, Santos showed no interest in the idea (as he is known for his usual investment on foreign series such as Chiquititas and Carrossel), and the rights were returned to Rede Globo. Globo later produced a new version of Sítio in 2001, featuring the first child actress to portray Emília in more than fifty years, Isabelle Drummond. The series ran for seven years and featured original characters that had not appeared in the books. Cuca's hunchback rotten minion Pesadelo ("Nightmare"), and the tender Zé Carijó (based on other Monteiro Lobato's famous creation, Jeca Tatu) were made popular among the audience. This version was canceled in 2007 due to poor ratings, mainly because in the last seasons the series had gigantic changes in the script, visuals and change of actors. An animated series was released in 2012, produced by Globo and Mixer, and was a reboot of the 2001 version. The first two seasons premiered first on Globo, but the third and final season premiered exclusively on Cartoon Network, because of the end of children's programming at Globo in 2015. On October 10, 2021, twenty years after the launch of the fifth version on Globo, a prank aimed at children using the characters from Monteiro Lobato's work was aired on the Programa Silvio Santos. With the announcement of the rebranding of SBT Vídeos to +SBT in November 2023, the production of the series was confirmed due to the good reception of the pranks between the years 2021 and 2023, since 2019, Lobato's works have been available in the public domain. The first images of the readaptation were released on December 24, 2023, with the release of the clip Fazendo Doce on the TV ZYN channel via YouTube, in addition to the release of excerpts from behind the scenes of the work, with the first scenes being produced. With the death of Joyce Lobato on January 29, 2024, SBT confirmed that it entered into a partnership with Monteiro Lobato's heirs to acquire the texts from the author's famous universe.

=== Comics ===
The 1977 TV series became a comic a few months after the program's debut, published by RGE. The major characters later received their own titles, such as Emília, Pedrinho and Visconde. After 1981 the comics had significant changes in the art style and were discontinued in 1984. The 2001 TV series was brought into the comic book format in 2003 for the national Brazilian anti-hunger campaign Fome Zero, entitled Emília e a Turma do Sítio no Fome Zero. The series generally dealt with nutritional reeducation. In 2006 were published new comic books also based on the 2001 TV series, by Globo. Titles starring Emília and Cuca were also published in this period. The comics were discontinued in 2008 and since then there has never been another adaptation.

=== Video game ===
In 1997 the electronic toy company Tectoy developed a platform game based on Sitio do Picapau Amarelo for Master System. The game was not based on any previous adaptation, and featured a redesign of the characters by cartoonist Ely Barbosa. The game was released exclusively in Brazil and had negative reviews.

== Soundtrack ==
- 1954 - Odeon Records - Sítio do Pica-pau Amarelo
- 1977 - Som Livre - Sítio do Picapau Amarelo
- 1979 - Som Livre - Sítio do Picapau Amarelo Vol. 2
- 1982 - Som Livre - Pirlimpimpim
- 1984 - Som Livre - Pirlimpimpim 2
- 2001 - Som Livre - Sítio do Picapau Amarelo
- 2005 - Som Livre - Sítio do Picapau Amarelo
- 2006 - Som Livre - Sítio do Picapau Amarelo
- 2023 - SBT Music - O Picapau Amarelo
- 2024 - SBT Music - O Picapau Amarelo Volume 2

== See also ==
- Emilia (Sítio do Picapau Amarelo), a fictional character of the Sítio do Picapau Amarelo series
- Sítio do Picapau Amarelo (fictional farm), the main setting

== Additional reading ==
- Santana-Dezmann, Vanete (2021). "Contradições em análises da obra infantil de Monteiro Lobato" (PDF). In Santana-Dezmann, Vanete; Milton, John; D'Onofrio, Silvio Tamaso (eds.). Para Compreender Monteiro Lobato: II Jornada Monteiro Lobato (in Brazilian Portuguese). Alemanha: Oxalá Editora. pp. 97–132. ISBN 9783946277583. Archived from the original (PDF) on 4 December 2022.
