= Sítio do Picapau Amarelo (fictional farm) =

Primary setting for the series of children's novels, Sítio do Picapau Amarelo

- Created by: Monteiro Lobato
- Genre: Children's literature, Fantasy

In-universe information
- Type: Fictional farm

The Sítio do Picapau Amarelo (literally translated and roughly known as the Yellow Woodpecker Farm or the Yellow Woodpecker Ranch) is the primary setting for the series of children's novels, Sítio do Picapau Amarelo, written by the Brazilian author Monteiro Lobato. The place is described as "a small farm with a pretty cottage, surrounded by trees" and close to several other subsettings: a stream, a virgin forest and a small village, both named the Tucanos.

== The Farm ==
In the farm lives an old widow, Dona Benta ("Mrs. Benta"), and her two grandchildren, a girl, Lúcia, referred to only by her nickname "Narizinho" (roughly "Little Nose", because of her turned-up nose), and her boy cousin, Pedrinho ("Pete"); the servant and cook, a black woman named Nastácia ("Anastacia"), and two talking puppets, the rag doll Emília (animated by some of Doctor Snail's "talking pills" she somehow "ingested") and an aristocratic and learned puppet made of corncob, the Viscount of Sabugosa ("sabugo" means corncob in Portuguese, "Sabugosa" is a parody of the real Count of Sabugosa). The Viscount always wears a top hat. The farm is home to various talking animals, including the fat pig Rabicó ("Short-Tail"), the cow Mocha (pronounced "Maw-sha"), the intelligent donkey Conselheiro ("Advisor"), and a tender rhinoceros called Quindim (named after quindim, a Brazilian dessert), who fled from a circus and was kept hidden by the children.

While in the farm, the children live several adventures in fantasy, with or without the participation of the older ones. The farm was devised as an attempt to sum up widespread characteristics of the Brazilian rural living of its time for educational purposes: Lobato intended to teach children to understand, to enjoy and to be proud of their cultural heritage and tried to do so by creating an entire milieu in which to set his children's stories so that they could all have a common Brazilian feel and background. The major features of the farm were established by the novel A Menina do Narizinho Arrebitado (The Girl With the Turned Up Nose), published in December 1920.

=== The stream ===
The nearby stream is usually visited by Lúcia, where she feeds its fishes with breadcrumbs. After Emília comes to life, it becomes difficult since the doll constantly astounds the trout with her constant gabble. The stream later reveals itself to be a portal for a wondrous underwater world, the Reino das Águas Claras ("Clear Waters Kingdom"), where Lúcia creates a bond, particularly to its king, the fish Príncipe Escamado ("Scaly Prince").

=== The Tucanos ===
A virgin forest that surrounds the farm, the Tucanos are inhabited by several supernatural beings from the Brazilian folklore. It is populated by a family of Sacis, tiny, black and one-legged gnomes who enjoy their time playing pranks on the farmers. They are able to manipulate wind, traveling inside swirls. The evil, reptilian witch Cuca lives in a cave inside the Tucanos. At the river, Pedrinho is seduced and almost killed by mermaid Mother of the Waters Iara, before the Saci saves him. At night, the Tucanos are a refuge for the Werewolf (or Lobishomen) and the Headless Mule, both originally ordinary people who suffered from an eternal and grisly curse.

=== The Tucanos village ===
The "Arraial dos Tucanos" is a nearby village occasionally visited by the farm dwellers. Colonel Teodorico and Elias the Merchant, good friends of Mr. Benta, live there. This setting and its characters have minor participation in the novels, but received later prominence in Rede Globo's television series.

=== Other worlds ===
Using a powerful magic powder, the "Pirlimpimpim", the children and their living toys They can visit any place, time, or fictional world. Such as Neverland, the mythological Ancient Greece (where the group intervene in Hercules' twelve labours, befriending him and saving Aunt Nastácia from Minotaur), the Fable, lands of One Thousand and One Nights and the Outer space. Through the powder, Emília lands in the End of the World itself, searching for the House of Keys in order to switch down the War key (and consequently World War II). In O Picapau Amarelo, the farm is visited by several fairy tale characters, including Cinderella, Snow White, Red Riding Hood, all of them led by Tom Thumb (a good friend of Emília's), he runs away from the Dona Carochinha, grumpy cockroach guardian of the fairy tale book.
