= Sítio do Picapau Amarelo (2012 TV series) =

2012 Brazilian animated series

- Also known as: Pirlimpimpim (English); El Rancho del Pájaro Amarillo (Spanish)
- Genre: Animated series
- Based on: Sítio do Picapau Amarelo by Monteiro Lobato
- Developed by: Rodrigo Castilho
- Voices of: Isabella Guarnieri; Larissa Manoela; Vini Takahashi; César Marchetti; Patrícia Scalvi; Gessy Fonseca
- Opening theme: Sítio do Picapau Amarelo by Gilberto Gil
- Country of origin: Brazil
- Original languages: Portuguese (Normal), Welsh (Season 4)
- No. of seasons: 3 (TBA: 4)
- No. of episodes: 78 (TBA: 104)

Production
- Executive producers: Eliane Ferreira; Reynaldo Marchesini; Fernanda Senatori; João Daniel Tikhomiroff
- Production companies: Globo; Mixer

Original release
- Network: Rede Globo (2012-2014); Cartoon Network (2012-2016); S4C (Season 4)
- Release: 7 January 2012 – 26 September 2016

Related
- Sítio do Picapau Amarelo (1952); Sítio do Picapau Amarelo (1964); Sítio do Picapau Amarelo (1967); Sítio do Picapau Amarelo (1977); Sítio do Picapau Amarelo (2001); O Picapau Amarelo (2024)

Sítio do Picapau Amarelo (roughly Yellow Woodpecker Farm or Yellow Woodpecker Ranch) was a 2012 Brazilian animated series loosely based on the eponymous series of books Sítio do Picapau Amarelo by Monteiro Lobato. It was first aired on 7 January 2012, and it was produced by Globo and Mixer. Each episode of the series took five weeks to get ready and were all based on the book of Reinações de Narizinho, published in 1931 by Monteiro Lobato. It was the first animated series adaptation of the work, after the five live-action versions of the television adaptation by the same name.

== Background ==
The animated series began to be produced in October 2010, by Mixer Productions in partnership with Globo. The model sheet of the characters was created by designer Bruno Okada, that was chosen after a competition sponsored by Globo. The animation is directed by Humberto Avelar. Each episode of the series took five weeks to complete.

The animation has replaced the violence portrayed in the books by Monteiro Lobato.

=== Mrs. Benta's Farm ===
Original design of the characters in the books, illustrated by Manoel Victor Filho.

In the Yellow Woodpecker Farm lives an old widow, Dona Benta and her two grandchildren, Lúcia (referred mostly by her nickname Narizinho, in English, little nose), and her cousin Pedrinho, which is Portuguese for little Pedro. Other residents include the housemaid Nastácia and the two talking puppets, the loud rag doll Emília and the aristocratic and learned puppet made of corncob Visconde de Sabugosa. The farm is home to various animals as well, including the fat pig Rabicó, the intelligent donkey Conselheiro ("Advisor"), and a rhinoceros called Quindim (named after quindim), who fled from a circus and was kept hidden by the children. Conselheiro has yet to appear in the show, though they all have animated designs.

The plot of most episodes consist of the children playing all day and having adventures normally through the use of a small bag of pirlimpimpim, a mystical sand that allows the wielder to go to wherever and even whenever they imagine (imagination is what fuels the pirlimpimpim; they additionally refrain from time travel due to the confusing consequences). They normally go to the Kingdom of Clear Waters, with inhabitants such as the noble fish Príncipe Escamado, or prince scaly, the seamstress spider Dona Aranha, or miss spider, and the old snail Doutor Caramujo, or doctor snail. Entities from Brazilian folklore also make appearances, such as the witch alligator Cuca, the Saci, and Iara.

The TV show is a modern interpretation of the books as it features foods like spaghetti, popcorn, and even milkshakes, plus modern swimsuit renditions, cars, and the like.

== Characters ==
The redesign of the characters in the animated series, created by designer Bruno Okada. Screenshot of the animated series.

Emília

Emilia is Lucia's anthropomorphic rag doll with chamomile leaves for hair. She was a present from Nastácia, gaining`the ability to talk through one of Doctor Snail's pills specifically for talking, though this pill also subsequently brought her to life.

Known for her nonstop chattering about everything on her mind, she is a very enthusiastic yet naive doll, always learning lessons in most episodes (she is arguably the "main" character of the show, and the mascot) due to her childish tendency to lie. This has died down since Season 1. She is the type to act before thinking with a short temper, and her headstrong sassy nature tends to land her in unfavorable situations that grow worse due to her stubbornness & selfishness. She is quite affectionate, getting jealous when another doll takes the spotlight and enjoying playing with her friends. A running gag is that Emilia frequently mispronounces words with Lucia correcting them, possibly due to her fast nature. Another running gag is her overreactive expressions, such as her "angry walk" and large grins.

While Emilia does not need to eat and cannot even taste flavors due to "being a rag doll", she combines several humanoid and doll properties. She gets cold without her dress, be stung by insects with visible bumps forming, produce saliva, faint from terribly awful smells, curl into a ball and move at high speeds, as well as tie knots in her body with no real repercussions.

Lúcia "Narizinho" (Lúcia "Little Nose" because of her turned-up nose)

Narizinho is a 7-year-old girl with a turned-up nose. She is Benta's granddaughter and Pedrinho's cousin. Known for being cute and girly, that does not keep her away from going on adventures with the rest of her family and playing outside. She is a very affectionate and caring person, but she has her short-sighted moments. She has a big sister-little sister relationship with Emília as she is her owner. In the books, she is an orphan and lives in the farm with Dona Benta, but this is not clarified in the show. In fact, a sub of the show emphasizes little nose and Dona Benta's relationship more than Little Pedro and Dona Benta's, putting into question the true relationships of all three.

Pedrinho (Little Pedro)

A 9-year-old boy, he is Benta's grandson and Lucia's cousin. He is a courageous and active boy who loves adventure and heroism. He is acrobatic and inventive, and he does not steer away from helping others. He normally journeys with the Captain of the Curassiers in adventures of all sorts. In the books, he lives in the big city and he spends his holidays at Mrs. Benta's Farm.

Visconde de Sabugosa (roughly "Viscount of Corncob"; "sabugo" means corncob in Portuguese. "Sabugosa" is a parody of the Count de Sabugosa)

Visconde is a very polite puppet made of corncob with a high IQ & a love for all knowledge, especially science such as biology and zoology. He is very pedantic as he is seen teaching the kids & correcting exaggerated stories and falsities of all sorts, even getting visibly irritated when done enough. He came to life from the "spirit" of a corn cob inhabiting a corncob puppet, and he can be resurrected by this method as well. He may have a crush on Emília.

He does not spend a lot of time with the kids; he instead prefers to read the books by the bookshelf, and he is usually the one the farm residents approach when they are curious about something. If he is not reading he is either doing research, inventing, or teaching the kids about certain topics.

Dona Benta (Mrs. Benta)

64 years old, she is the Farm's owner and the anointed storyteller at night. She is Little Pedro and little nose’s grandmother and "mother" figure. She is a observative & wise woman who is not keen of adventure, and she tends to stay at the farm and do housework. She is not above punishing the kids when they misbehave, though she still cares for them deeply.

Tia Nastácia (Aunt nastácia)

She is Benta's black housemaid and she is 66 years old. She is a hard worker, very strict, and a routine-based person, calling the kids for eating & errands. She is also renowned for being an excellent cook, adored by everyone. She also has knack for making living dolls, seen with Visconde, Little Pedro’s doll, and Angelica's doll.

Rabicó

A gluttonous, selfish, cowardly and lazy pig. While he is the cast member who tends to get into the deepest trouble and is the butt of many jokes, he is not intrinsically evil and is normally friendly. He loves Nastácia's cooking, and she recognizes this love as well.

Cuca

Cuca is an alligator witch. She is very deceptive and evil, and she usually scares the kids even through the stories they are told. She is so vile that she does not refrain from killing targets & her "legend" extends to other kingdoms, such as the Kingdom of Clear Waters. Even with that she yearns for affection and help when she needs it. She can use magic for a variety of purposes, such as creating spikes from the ground, attacking targets with magic bolts, and even teleporting in the likeness of Dragon Ball's Instant Transmission on at least one occasion.

Príncipe Escamado (Prince scaly)

He is the royal ruler of the Kingdom of the Clear Waters. Noble and thoughtful, he makes time for his friends and is very generous & considerate of his subjects, though he can be too generous at some points. While he is anointed King by O Mistério do Reino das Águas Claras, he is still referred to as Prince afterwards. He seems to have a crush on little nose, asking her to be his princess in Season 1 and cheering for her when she tried to be the royal jester. She does not reciprocate this affection however.

Dona Aranha ("Miss Spider")

She is the royal seamstress of the Kingdom of the Clear Waters who takes great joy in making dresses for her friends, especially Narizinho. When she was a child, she was cursed by a witch that forced her to become a seamstress, broken only when one of her dresses is called "the best in the world". While the 1000 year curse was accidentally broken by Emília, she chose to continue being a seamstress as she had done it for so long & enjoyed it so much.

Doutor Caramujo ("Doctor Snail")

An old and polite snail doctor who is known in the Kingdom of the Clear Waters for being able to cure anything with his several pills such as those for allowing dolls to talk.

Tio Barnabé (Uncle Barnabé)

An kind old black man who knows a lot about folk superstitions. Much like Nastácia he works hard at Mrs. Benta's farm and even contests with her at times, but he is the least seen character of the whole cast; he's only seen after Season 1 in a couple episodes.

Saci-Pererê

A black one-legged trickster elf. He travels via miniature tornado and he is the protector of the forest. His cowl is integral to his character- whoever holds the cowl and commands it also commands Saci. The Saci primarily shown is not a sole Saci- several other Saci exist with the same get-up.

Angelica

The 9 year old granddaughter of one of Dona Benta's friends, she is a girl from the city. In contrast to the adventurous little nose, she is what she considers "grown up": discarding all playing & toys and doing things such as painting her fingernails and sunbathing. Due to this lack of experience & tendency to stay in her lane she is more susceptible to fear (such as of the forest). By the end of her debut she is more open as she receives a "living" doll in her likeness from Nastacia.

Visconde's family (father, grandmother, nephew)
Lua

Lua is a cute polite girl who was found bathing in the river water in her debut A Namorada do Saci. It was revealed later she was the moon who took human form. She loves Saci as Saci loves her, though both are heartbroken by the end of the episode.

== Voice cast ==
- Gessy Fonseca - Dona Benta
- Patrícia Scalvi - Tia Nastácia (Season 1-2)
- Patrícia Pichamone - Tia Nastácia (Season 3)
- Larissa Manoela - Narizinho (Season 1)
- Luiza Telles Rosa - Narizinho (Season 2-3)
- Vini Takahashi - Pedrinho (Season 1)
- Pedro Volpato - Pedrinho (Season 2)
- Renato Cavalcante - Pedrinho (Season 3)
- Isabella Guarnieri - Emília
- César Marchetti - Visconde de Sabugosa / Tio Barnabé / Quindim
- Hugo Picchi - Rabicó / Doutor Caramujo
- Alessandra Araújo - Cuca
- Fernanda Bock - Saci
- Daniel Figueira - Príncipe Escamado
- Zayra Zordan - Dona Aranha

== Episodes ==
=== Season 1 (2012) ===
1. "Um Lugar Diferente (A Different Place)"
2. "Um Grande Aventureiro (A Great Adventurer)"
3. "As Promessas do Rabicó (The Promises of Rabicó)"
4. "O Bolo de Tia Nastácia (Aunt Nastácia’s Cake)"
5. "A Pílula do Doutor Caramujo (Doctor snail’s pill)"
6. "A Princesa do Reino das Águas Claras (The Princess of the Kingdom of the Clear Waters)"
7. "A Viagem de Dona Benta (The Voyage of Mrs. Benta)"
8. "A Pipa da Emília (Emília’s kite)"
9. "As Tarefas do Visconde (The Tasks of Visconde)"
10. "A Fuga da Emília (Emília’s trail)"
11. "O Amigo Invisível (The Invisible Friend)"
12. "A História do Gato (The History of the Cat)"
13. "A Sorte da Emília (Emília’s luck)"
14. "O Circo do Pica-Pau Amarelo (The Yellow Woodpecker Circus)"
15. "A Dieta do Rabicó (Rabicó’s diet)"
16. "O Feitiço do Visconde (Visconde’s spell)"
17. "O Vestido Mais Bonito do Mundo (The World’s Most Beautiful Dress)"
18. "Os Carimbos da Emília (Emília’s stamps)"
19. "A Marquesa de Rabicó (Rabicó’s Marquise)"
20. "O Polvo de Estimação (The Pet Octopus)"
21. "A Fábula de Tia Nastácia (The Fable of Aunt Nastácia)"
22. "O Roubo do Pirlimpimpim (The Theft of the Pirlimpimpim)"
23. "A Fada do Sono (The Sleep Fairy)"
24. "A Língua das Formigas (The Language of The Ants)"
25. "Uma Boneca Sem Paciência (A Doll Without Patience)"
26. "O Outro Boneco (The Other Doll)"

=== Season 2 (2013–2014) ===
27. "O Saci (The Saci)"
28. "O Tratamento de Beleza da Cuca (Cuca's Beauty Treatment)"
29. "O Segredo da Emília (Emilia's Secret)"
30. "Um Sabugo Muito Estranho (A Very Strange Corncob)"
31. "A Batalha dos Piratas (the Battle of the Pirates)"
32. "O Bobo da Corte (The Court Jester)"
33. "A Varinha de Condão (The Magic Wand)"
34. "Uma Visita para Narizinho (A Visit to Little Nose)"
35. "O Futuro do Rabicó (Rabicó’s future)"
36. "O Aniversário da Cuca (The Cuca's Birthday)"
37. "A Serpente do Mar (The Sea Serpent)"
38. "A Escola da Emília (Emília's School)"
39. "A Máquina de Risadas (The Laughter Machine)"
40. "O Protetor da Floresta (The Protector of the Forest)"
41. "A Coragem do Rabicó (Rabicó’s courage)"
42. "O Mistério do Reino das Águas Claras (The Mystery of the Kingdom of the Clear Waters)"
43. "A Cura da Emília (Emília's Cure)"
44. "A Fonte de Pirlimpimpim (The Fountain of Pirlimpimpim)"
45. "O Dia Perfeito (The Perfect Day)"
46. "O Clone do Visconde (Visconde’s clone)"
47. "A Festa de São João (The São João Party)"
48. "O Melhor Lugar do Mundo (The Best Place in the World)"
49. "A Família do Visconde (Visconde’s family)"
50. "Os Borboletogramas da Emília (Emilia's Butterflygrams)"
51. "A Namorada do Saci (The Saci's Girlfriend)"
52. "O Rapto do Príncipe Escamado (The Kidnapping of the prince scaly)"

=== Season 3 (2015–2016) ===
53. "O Quindim (The Quindim)"
54. "O Álbum de Figurinhas (The Sticker Album)"
55. "A Corrida de Cavalos-Marinhos (The Seahorse Race)"
56. "A Última Chance do Rabicó (Rabicó’s last chance)"
57. "As Histórias de Dona Benta (Mrs. Benta's Stories)"
58. "O Banho da Emília (Emília's Bath)"
59. "A Paixão do Rabicó (Rabicó’s love)"
60. "A Onça Pintada (The Jaguar)"
61. "Uma Boneca Muito Famosa (A Very Famous Doll)"
62. "A Inteligência do Rabicó (Rabicó’s Intelligence)"
63. "O Mistério da Sereia (The Mystery of the Mermaid)"
64. "As Medalhas da Emília (Emília's Medals)"
65. "O Gênio da Lâmpada (The Lamp Genie)"
66. "O Super Porco (Super Pig)"
67. "A Máquina de Ler Pensamento (The Thoughts Reading Machine)"
68. "O Quarto do Quindim (The Quindim’s Room)"
69. "O Show de Horror (The Horror Show)"
70. "A Reforma da Natureza (The Reform of Nature)"
71. "O Lobisomem (The Werewolf)"
72. "O Anjo da Emília (Emília's Angel)"
73. "A Escola dos Sacis (The School of the Sacis)"
74. "A Gincana da Emília (Emília’s scavenger hunt)"
75. "O Cavaleiro Andante (The Andante knight)"
76. "O Casamento da Cuca (Cuca's Marriage)"
77. "A Caça ao Tesouro (The Treasure Hunt)"
78. "Um Lugar Especial (A Special Place)"

== Reception ==
The series featured a regular audience among the public, although many fans of the franchise have not enjoyed this compared to other adaptations due to its more childlike version. Nevertheless, it became one of the most watched shows on Cartoon Network. Moreover, the series was very successful in other countries of Latin America where it is displayed as El Rancho del Pájaro Amarillo through the branches of Cartoon Network and Tooncast including being awarded the "International Festival of Animation Chilemonos" in Chile as the Best Latin American Animated Series.
