= Sítio do Picapau Amarelo (2001 TV series) =

2001 Brazilian children's television series

- Also known as: Pirlimpimpim (in European Portuguese)
- Genre: Children's television, Fantasy, Comedy
- Based on: Sítio do Picapau Amarelo by Monteiro Lobato
- Directed by: Márcio Trigo (2001-2002); Roberto Talma (2001-2002); Pedro Vasconcelos (2001-2002); Marcelo Zambelli (2001-2002); Cininha de Paula (2002-2005); Paulo Ghelli (2002-2005); Luiz Antonio Pilar (2003-2004); Marco Rodrigo (2005); Carlos Manga (2006); Ulysses Cruz (2006); Federico Bonani (2006); Creso Eduardo Macedo (2006-2007); Carlos Magalhães (2007); Carlo Milani (2007); Alexandre Guimarães (2007); Maria José Rodrigues (2007)
- Starring: Nicette Bruno; Suely Franco; Bete Mendes; Dhu Moraes; Rosa Marya Colin; Isabelle Drummond; Tatyane Goulart; Lara Rodrigues; Caroline Molinari; Amanda Diniz; Raquel de Queiroz; César Cardadeiro; João Vítor Silva; Rodolfo Valente; Vitor Mayer; Cândido Damm; Aramis Trindade; Kiko Mascarenhas; João Acaiabe; Gésio Amadeu; Izak Dahora; Fabrício Boliveira
- Voices of: Voice actors: Mário Jorge de Andrade; Mauro Ramos; Márcio Simões; Mônica Rossi
- Opening theme: Sítio do Picapau Amarelo (Gilberto Gil)
- Ending theme: Sítio do Picapau Amarelo (Gilberto Gil)
- Country of origin: Brazil
- Original language: Portuguese
- No. of seasons: 7
- No. of episodes: 61 stories and 1.159 chapters

Production
- Running time: 23-27 minutes (2001-2004); 25–30 minutes (2005-2007)
- Production company: Central Globo de Produção

Original release
- Network: Rede Globo
- Release: 12 October 2001 – 7 December 2007

Related
- Sítio do Picapau Amarelo (1952); Sítio do Picapau Amarelo (1964); Sítio do Picapau Amarelo (1967); Sítio do Picapau Amarelo (1977); Sítio do Picapau Amarelo (2012); O Picapau Amarelo (2024)

Sítio do Picapau Amarelo (European Portuguese title: Pirlimpimpim) is a Brazilian children's television series, based on the work of Monteiro Lobato, adapted by Márcio Trigo and Roberto Talma. It was the fifth television adaptation of the work, after the first version aired by Rede Tupi between 1952 and 1963, the second version aired by TV Cultura in 1964, the third version aired by Band between 1967 and 1969 and the fourth version aired by Rede Globo itself between 1977 and 1986.

It was produced and aired by Rede Globo from 2001 to 2007, After its original airing on Rede Globo, the first 4 seasons of the series were aired by Futura channel from 8 December 2008, the series was also aired by Viva and TV Cultura channel in 2013.

== Reruns ==
The series began to be rerun by Canal Futura from 8 December 2008, but the channel only aired the episodes of the first four seasons of the series, except for the last episode of the fourth season "O Pequeno Samurai" with only half of the episode, due to the following seasons being formatted as a telenovela and the episode "O Pequeno Samurai" being considered inadequate and too strong for the channel's educational standard. For some reason, the seventh and final season, which is not in the soap opera format, was never released by Rede Globo. The series was also aired on the subscription channel Gloob, which managed to release all seasons, but the show only aired until the fourth season, and after some time took the series off its schedule, before airing the last few seasons. It was also shown by Canal Viva, and by TV Cultura from 30 August 2013 to 27 June 2014, until it went off the air because of the return of the series Castelo Rá-Tim-Bum on the channel's programming from 30 August 2014. June. It was aired again by the same station on 10 January 2015, on Saturdays at 6:30 pm. It is also shown internationally with its original audio by TV Globo Internacional, and has also been shown in Portugal by SIC that aired until the fifth season, but with the title of Pirlimpimpim, which did not have much repercussion and soon went off the air.

== Synopsis ==
The series exhibited several stories based on Brazilian folklore, always with characters such as Cuca, Saci Pererê, Iara. The residents of Sítio, Emília, Narizinho, Pedrinho, Dona Benta and Tia Nastácia lived several adventures, a lot of mystery and dangers that haunted the remote town of Arraial do Tucanos.

== Cast and characters ==
=== Main ===
- Isabelle Drummond as Emília (2001–2006)
- Tatyane Goulart as Emília (2007)
- Lara Rodrigues as Narizinho (2001–2003); Samira Turco (2006)
- Caroline Molinari as Narizinho (2004–2005)
- Amanda Diniz as Narizinho (2006)
- Raquel de Queiroz as Narizinho (2007)
- César Cardadeiro as Pedrinho (2001–2003)
- João Vítor Silva as Pedrinho (2004–2005); Caipora (2006)
- Rodolfo Valente as Pedrinho (2006)
- Vitor Mayer as Pedrinho (2007)
- Nicette Bruno as Dona Benta (2001–2004)
- Suely Franco as Dona Benta (2005–2006)
- Bete Mendes as Dona Benta (2007)
- Dhu Moraes as Tia Nastácia (2001–2006)
- Rosa Marya Colin as Tia Nastácia (2007)
- Cândido Damm as Visconde de Sabugosa (2001–2004)
- Aramis Trindade as Visconde de Sabugosa (2005–2006)
- Kiko Mascarenhas as Visconde de Sabugosa (2007)
- João Acaiabe as Tio Barnabé (2001–2006)
- Gésio Amadeu as Tio Barnabé (2007)
- Jacira Santos (body)/Mônica Rossi (voice) as Cuca (2001–2006)
- Solange Couto as Cuca (2007)
- Izak Dahora as Saci (2001–2006)
- Fabrício Boliveira as Saci (2007)
- Roberto Dornelles (body)/Mário Jorge de Andrade as Rabicó (2001–2002)
- Alinne Mendonça (body)/Mário Jorge de Andrade as Rabicó (2003–2006)
- Ricardo Tostes (body and voice) as Rabicó (2007)
- Zé Clayton (body)/Márcio Simões (voice) as Conselheiro (2001–2007)
- Sidney Beckencamp (body)/Mauro Ramos (voice) as Quindim (2001–2005)
- Cassiano Carneiro as Zé Carijó (2002–2006)
- Leandro Léo as Pesadelo (2002–2005)

=== Recurring ===
- Ary Fontoura as Coronel Teodorico de Menezes (2001–2005)
- Isaac Bardavid as Miguelito Ramirez de Souza Rodrigues (2001); Elias Turco (2006)
- Edson Celulari as Dom Quixote (2001)
- Deborah Evelyn as Astrônoma (2001)
- Deborah Secco as Herself (2001)
- Tony Ramos as Himself (2001)
- Isabela Garcia as Mrs. Merenguita (2001)
- Maurício Mattar as Tupã (2001)
- Herson Capri as São Jorge (2001)
- Carlos Vereza as Dr. Austregésio (2001); Trovoada (2002)
- Malu Mader as Herself disguise by Cuca (2001)
- Reynaldo Gianecchini as Himself (2001)
- Ivete Sangalo as Cassia (2001)
- Murilo Rosa as Himself (2001)
- Cissa Guimarães as Cissa (2001)
- Ney Latorraca as Baron Munchausen (2001)
- Regiane Alves as Snow White (2001)
- Samara Felippo as Snow White (2001–2002)
- Bruno Gagliasso as Romildo / Romeu (2002)
- Antônio Calloni as Conde Xis Parmesan (2002)
- Zezé Polessa as Aranha Secretária (2002)
- Fernanda Rodrigues as Cinderela (2002)
- Maria Maya as Tonica Ventania (2002)
- Maria Luísa Mendonça as Palas Atena; Flora (2002)
- Bruna Marquezine as Broken Wing Angel (2002); Jajale / Marina (2004)
- Lília Cabral as Hera (2002)
- Danielle Winits as Drª. Jaqueline / Cuca (2002)
- Márcio Garcia as Príncipe Rajá Codadade (2002)
- Eva Todor as Maria José (Mazé) (2002)
- Ana Maria Braga as Herself (2002)
- Juliana Paes as Jurema (2002)
- Nizo Neto as Nestor / Frankeinstein (2002–2005)
- Susana Werner as Sereia Serena (2002)
- Humberto Martins as Long John Silver (2002)
- Thiago Lacerda as Hans Staden (2002)
- Angélica as Herself disguise by Cuca (2002)
- Helena Fernandes as Evil Queen (2002)
- Leandra Leal as Wallet Disguised By Cuca (2002); Guinevere (2003)
- Guilherme Leme as Hermes (2002)
- Lupe Gigliotti as Bruxa Velha (2002); Senhora que dá carona para o Bacamarte (2003); Dona Joaninha (2004–2005)
- Darlan Cunha as Zé (2002)
- Ludmila Dayer as Juliana (2002)
- Rodrigo Faro as Hércules (2002)
- Elias Gleizer as Rei Euristeus (2002); Berloque (2003)
- Marilu Bueno as Dona Carochinha (2003-2005)
- Carla Diaz as Cléo (2003)
- Carla Marins as Headless Mule / Berta (2003)
- Alessandra Negrini as Rapunzel (2003)
- Luana Piovani as Morgana (2003)
- Leticia Spiller as Gravita (2003)
- Cássio Gabus Mendes as Nicanor (2003)
- Cláudia Raia as Medéia (2003)
- Arlete Salles as Hermengarda (2003)
- Paulo Goulart as Bartolomeu Bueno da Silva (2003)
- Norton Nascimento as Maldoror (2003)
- Guilherme Karan as Anibal (2003)
- Luiz Carlos Tourinho Mefisto (2003)
- Lima Duarte as João Melado (2003)
- Priscila Fantin as Bela (2003)
- Luigi Baricelli as Fera (2003)
- Fernanda Paes Leme as Clarice (2003)
- Márcia Cabrita as Dulce (2003); Estelita (2005); Cacá (Cuca) (2006)
- Mara Manzan as Tetéia (2003)
- Juliana Knust as Piracema (2003)
- Supla as Elvis McCartney (2004)
- Rita Guedes as Amorzinho (2004)
- Flávia Alessandra as Branca Flor (2004)
- Marcelo Serrado as Polidoro (2004)
- Wanessa Camargo as Diana Dechamps (2004)
- Maria João Bastos as Isabel (2004)
- Thávyne Ferrari as Patty Pop (2005); Flora Caipora (2006)
- Chico Anysio as Dr. SaraIva (2005)
- Lu Grimaldi as Marcela (2005)
- Thiago Fragoso as Rabicó Humano (2005)
- Yachmin Gazal as Antonica (2005)
- Bel Kutner as Flor (2006)
- Thiago de Los Reyes as Príncipe Theo (2006)
- Flávio Migliaccio as Iaú (2004); Eremita (2006)
- Dirce Migliaccio as Mãe de Valdo (2006)
- Lidi Lisboa as Jurema (2006)
- Sophie Charlotte as Cinderela (2006)
- Maria Gladys as Fátima (2006)
- Nelson Xavier as Barão de Tremembé (2007)
- Humberto Carrão as Caipora (2007)
- Aglido Ribeiro as Coronel Teotônico (2007)
- Paulo Gustavo as Delegado Lupicínio (2007)
- Mateus Solano as Pop Man (2007)
- Duse Nacaratti as Velha Firinfiféia (2007)

== Production ==
Years after the end of the contract between Monteiro Lobato's heirs and Rede Globo, for the production of the series in the 70s and 80s of Sítio do Picapau Amarelo, in 1999 Cíntia Abravanel, daughter of television presenter Silvio Santos, intended to get the rights for a new adaptation of the works of Monteiro Lobato on SBT, his father's network. However, Silvio Santos showed no interest in the idea, and the rights then returned to Rede Globo.

Rede Globo, in turn, began producing a new adaptation of Sítio in July 2000 and on 12 October 2001, it began airing it within the children's program Bambuluá, in a special edition for Children's Day. Finally, from 22 December 2001, Sítio was shown separately until 2007, when it began airing within the program TV Xuxa.

== Seasons ==
| Seasons | Episodes | Original transmission (Brazil) | |
| Seasons | Episodes | Start | End |
|---|---|---|---|
| 1 | 186 | 12 October 2001 | 30 August 2002 |
| Especial | | 26 December 2001 | |
| 2 | 85 | 9 September 2002 | 7 December 2002 |
| Especial | | 24 December 2002 | |
| 3 | 169 | 7 April 2003 | 26 February 2004 |
| 4 | 179 | 12 April 2004 | 25 February 2005 |
| 5 | 194 | 4 April 2005 | 29 December 2005 |
| 6 | 184 | 3 April 2006 | 14 December 2006 |
| 7 | 164 | 9 April 2007 | 7 December 2007 |

== Soundtrack ==
=== Sítio do Picapau Amarelo (2001 album) ===
Sítio do Picapau Amarelo

Soundtrack album by Various Artists
- Released: 2001
- Genres: Pop; MPB; Children's music
- Language: Brazilian Portuguese
- Label: Som Livre
- Director: Mariozinho Rocha
- Producer: Ricardo Ottoboni

Sítio do Picapau Amarelo is the soundtrack of the Brazilian television series of the same name. The album was released in 2001 by the Som Livre record company, which carries the soundtrack of the series with songs already known to the general public, as most of the songs are re-recordings of the songs from the first version of Sítio do Picapau Amarelo (such as Sítio do Picapau Amarelo in 1977 and Sítio do Picapau Amarelo Vol. 2 in 1979) was aired by Rede Globo between 1977 and 1986, featuring only 5 new songs, was released in late 2001 along with a VHS of the first episode of the series "Reino das Águas Claras".

=== Sítio do Picapau Amarelo (2005 album) ===
Sítio do Picapau Amarelo

Soundtrack album by Various Artists
- Released: 2005
- Genres: Pop; Sertanejo music; Children's music
- Language: Brazilian Portuguese
- Label: Som Livre

Sítio do Picapau Amarelo is the soundtrack for the 5th season of the Brazilian television series of the same name. It was released in 2005 by the Som Livre record company in CD format.

=== Sítio do Picapau Amarelo (2006 album) ===
Sítio do Picapau Amarelo

Soundtrack album by Various Artists
- Released: 2006
- Genres: Soundtrack; Instrumental; Children's music
- Language: Brazilian Portuguese
- Label: Som Livre

Sítio do Picapau Amarelo is the last soundtrack of the 6th season of the Brazilian television series of the same name. The album was released in 2006 by Som Livre on CD, which contains 12 songs by the characters and 13 instrumental songs composed by Tim Rescala.
