= Lobisomem =

Mythological creature from South American folklore

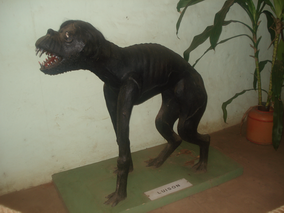
Luisón, a variant of the Lobisomem from Guarani Mythology

The lobisomem is a creature in the folklore of South America. In Brazil, it is usually thought to be a werewolf, and "lobisomem" is the usual Portuguese word for it. In some versions, however, he is depicted as a ball of fire, or an unusually large pig. In human form, it is said to look like a normal person except for slightly pointed ears and yellowish pale skin. In werewolf form it has no difference whatsoever from other cultures' descriptions.

== Creation ==
There are a variety of ways that one can become a lobisomem:

1. Being bit by a lobisomem;

2. Coming into contact with a lobisomem's blood;

3. Being a family's seventh son, in which case the son can be saved by making one of his elder brothers his godfather;

4. Being the first male son of a couple with seven daughters. In which case the first transformation takes place on the said son's thirteenth birthday;

5. Punishment for incest, concubinage, or a woman having sexual relations with a priest;

Some say that a lobisomem transforms every day in which the moon is in its full phase, others say that the change only occurs on Fridays with such condition. Either way, in all versions it transforms at night, usually attacking travelers and animals on the road.

== Etymology ==
The name is derived from Latin lupus + homo, respectively lobo ("wolf"), and homem ("man") in Portuguese.

In some parts of the Amazon the term Cumacanga is used, though it is unclear if this is the female version of lobisomem, or if this is a different but related story. The term cumacanga comes from Acanga ("Head") and cunhã ("Indian Woman"), so it can be interpreted as "Head of a woman."

== See also ==
- Capelobo
- Werewolf
