= Sítio do Picapau Amarelo (1977 TV series) =

1977 Brazilian children's television series

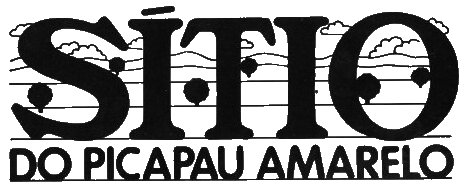
- Genre: Children's television, Fantasy, Comedy
- Created by: Monteiro Lobato (series of novels)
- Based on: Sítio do Picapau Amarelo by Monteiro Lobato
- Directed by: Geraldo Casé
- Starring: Zilka Salaberry; Jacira Sampaio; Rosana Garcia; Daniele Rodrigues; Izabella Bicalho; Gabriela Senra; Júlio César; Marcello José; Daniel Lobo; Dirce Migliaccio; Reny de Oliveira; Suzana Abranches; André Valli; Samuel dos Santos; Tonico Pereira; Canarinho; Ivan Setta; Dorinha Duval; Stella Freitas; Catarina Abdala; Romeu Evaristo
- Opening theme: Sítio do Picapau Amarelo (Gilberto Gil)
- Ending theme: Sítio do Picapau Amarelo (Gilberto Gil)
- Composer: Dori Caymmi
- Country of origin: Brazil
- Original language: Portuguese
- No. of seasons: 10
- No. of episodes: 1.552 (69 stories)

Production
- Editor: Paulo Rice
- Production company: Central Globo de Produção

Original release
- Network: Rede Globo
- Release: 7 March 1977 – 31 January 1986

Related
- Sítio do Picapau Amarelo (1952); Sítio do Picapau Amarelo (1964); Sítio do Picapau Amarelo (1967); Sítio do Picapau Amarelo (2001); Sítio do Picapau Amarelo (2012); O Picapau Amarelo (2024)

Sítio do Picapau Amarelo was a Brazilian children's television series, which aired on Rede Globo from 1977 to 1986. It was produced in partnership with TVE and the Brazilian Ministry of Education, It was the fourth television adaptation of the homonymous work by Monteiro Lobato, after the first version aired by Rede Tupi between 1952 and 1963, the second version aired by TV Cultura in 1964 and 1965 and the third version aired by Band between 1967 and 1969.

== Plot ==
Dona Benta is an old lady who lives in Sítio do Pica-Pau Amarelo, away from the hustle and bustle of the big city. With her live Tia Nastácia, who cooks delicacies for everyone, and her granddaughter Lúcia, better known as Narizinho. Living alone and having only two elderly women for company, the girl creates a world of fantasies, in which the main character is her doll Emília, made by Tia Nastácia with scraps of cloth. Old Tio Barnabé and his helpers Zé Carneiro and Malazarte, who are responsible for maintaining the ranch, also live on the ranch.

One day Narizinho meets Príncipe Escamado, sovereign of the Kingdom of Águas Claras, which, by coincidence, is located on the riverside of the ranch. The Prince is delighted with the girl and invites her to visit her kingdom. There, she is introduced to the most prominent subjects, such as the sour Carochinha, responsible for administering the fairy tales, and determined to keep Little Thumb trapped in her books. Also Dr. Caramujo, a renowned scientist, who gives Emília the talking pill. After taking the medicine, Emília starts talking and doesn't stop.

During school holidays, Narizinho is accompanied by her cousin Pedrinho, who studies in the big city where he lives with his mother. The Boy also has a friend built by Tia Nastácia, the Visconde de Sabugosa, made from an old corn cob, which also comes to life. For having been forgotten, for a long time among the books, the Visconde acquired an admirable wisdom, becoming an intellectual and scientist.

Sítio do Pica-Pau Amarelo is a place where everything is possible. Fantasy mixes with reality, becoming part of Narizinho's and her cousin Pedrinho's daily lives. Together with adult characters, the children share their adventures in a fantastic world where the doll Emília, Visconde de Sabugosa, Saci Pererê, Cuca, Iara and other fantasy characters appear.

== Cast ==
- Zilka Salaberry - Dona Benta
- Jacira Sampaio - Tia Nastácia
- Rosana Garcia - Narizinho (1977 to 1980)
- Daniele Rodrigues - Narizinho (1981 to 1982)
- Izabella Bicalho - Narizinho (1983 to 1984)
- Gabriela Senra - Narizinho (1985 to 1986)
- Júlio César - Pedrinho (1977 to 1980)
- Marcello José Reina Patelli - Pedrinho (1981 to 1984)
- Daniel Lobo - Pedrinho (1985 to 1986)
- Dirce Migliaccio - Emília (1977)
- Reny de Oliveira - Emília (1978 to 1982)
- Suzana Abranches - Emília (1983 to 1986)
- André Valli - Visconde de Sabugosa
- Samuel dos Santos - Tio Barnabé
- Tonico Pereira - Zé Carneiro
- Canarinho - Garnizé / Malazarte
- Ivan Senna - João Perfeito
- Romeu Evaristo - Saci Pererê
- Genivaldo Santos - Saci Tric
- Dorinha Duval - Cuca (1977 and some 1980 episodes)
- Stela Freitas - Cuca (1978, 1979 and some 1980 episodes) / Abelha Nair (1978)
- Catarina Abdala - Cuca (1981 to 1985)
- Rosana Israel - Cuca (1986)
- Chaguinha - Rabicó e Besouro 1
- Nelson Camargo - Compadre Zé Bento
- Germano Filho - Seu Elias Turco (1977)
- Francisco Nagen - Seu Elias Turco (1978 to 1986)
- Zezé Macedo - Dona Carochinha
- Cacá Silveira - Príncipe Escamado
- Paulo César Soares - Sapo Major * Agarra e Não Solta Mais
- Shulamith Yaari - Dona Aranha
- Richard Eggenstein - Tonho
- Cláudio Savietto - Tommil
- Thaís Portinho - Ritinha
- Wilson Grey - Jeca Tatu
- Lajar Muzuris - índio Harú
- Nilson Condé - Príncipe Ahmed
- Carlos Adib - Postman
- Francisco Silva - Boticário
- Apolo Correia - Barbeiro
- Dary Reis - Captain Hook
- Jayme Barcellos - Coronel Teodorico
- Ankito - Curupira and the Little Tin Soldier
- José Mayer - Burro Falante (1977 to 1982)
- Ivan Setta - Burro Falante (1983 to 1986)
- Lina Rossana - Das Dores
- Júlio Braga - Besouro 2
- Gabriela Alves Storace - Anjinho 1
- Luis Carlos Niño - Farukinho
- Renata Abreu - Criança 1
- Sokram Sommar - Anjinho 2
- Túlio Abreu - Criança 2
- Isabela Garcia - Tinker Bell
- Maitê Proença - Bela
- Flávio Migliaccio - Ptolomeu
- Myriam Pérsia - Antonica, mother of Pedrinho
- Isaac Bardavid - Cássio (1978); Antônio Carreiro (1979)
- Nélia Paula - Arminda
- Lucinha Lins as Rapunzel (1981)
- José de Abreu - Rapunzel's Father (1981); Blue Beard (1984)
- Arthur Oscar Junior - Tom Thumb (1978)
- José Leonardo - Tom Thumb (1982)
- Bia Lessa - Ordélia
- Cininha De Paula - Mofélia
- Rinchando e Correndo - Mula sem cabeça
- Orlando Borges - Big Bad Wolf
- Tereza Rachel - Evil Queen
- Mário Maya - Aladdin / Gato Félix
- Marco Nanini - Guarda Anselmo
- Nizo Neto as Raulzinho
- Ary Fontoura as Mágico Mandarino
- Daniel Filho as Tom Mix

== Production ==
The ideal designation for the format of the program is "serial", due to its division into episodes that form complete stories. The episodes of the series varied in duration, with a variable number of chapters – 5, 10, 15, 20 (mostly), 25, 30, 35, 40, 65 and 90.

This version, shown between 1977 and 1986, was the best known of all the TV versions of Monteiro Lobato's book series. The scripts were written by important names in Brazilian television drama, such as Benedito Ruy Barbosa, Marcos Rey, Silvan Paezzo and Wilson Rocha. The general direction and idealization of the program was by Geraldo Casé, considered the "father" of the program in its almost 10 years of airing. Other directors also went through the program, such as Fábio Sabag, Gracindo Júnior, Roberto Vignati, Reynaldo Boury. The general direction, however, was always Geraldo Casé. Edwaldo Package was the general supervisor.

The neighborhood of Barra de Guaratiba received the fixed location for the recordings. A farm, with a house, corral and gardens, was rented and adapted for the program on Estrada Burle Marx. There, the external scenes were recorded on the porch, on the patio and in the gardens, as well as some internal ones, carried out in the living room, kitchen and barn environments. The other interior scenes – the library, the laboratory of the Visconde de Sabugosa, the bedrooms, the Cuca cave, the Reino das Águas Claras, among other environments – were recorded in the Cinédia studios. Scenes in the woods were recorded in Floresta da Tijuca, Barra de Guaratiba and Pedra de Guaratiba. The "Arraial dos Tucanos" was built scenographically next to the Sítio and all the internal environments - such as the sale of Seu Elias - were located there. The beach where he appears in some episodes, such as The Minotaur, The Pirates of Captain Hook, Dom Quixote, The Terrible Bird Roca and Robson Crusoe, among others, was Grumari beach, close to Barra de Guaratiba, which served and serves until nowadays a backdrop for other Rede Globo productions.

After a few years of abandonment, the house that served as the setting for the filming has been restored and since June 2021 it is open for visits from Wednesday to Sunday.

== Seasons ==
Seasons	Episodes	Chapters	Original transmission (Brazil)	
Seasons	Episodes	Chapters	Start	End
1	6	195	7 March 1977	2 December 1977
2	9	180	6 March 1978	27 November 1978
3	9	180	19 March 1979	23 November 1979
4	8	190	3 March 1980	21 November 1980
5	10	210	16 March 1981	31 December 1981
6	13	145	26 April 1982	10 December 1982
7	7	217	7 March 1983	31 December 1983
8	5	195	19 March 1984	28 December 1984
9	1	20	1 July 1985	26 July 1985
10	1	20	6 January 1986	31 January 1986

== Broadcast ==
The series was shown on TV Globo between March 7, 1977 and January 31, 1986, with 69 episodes and 1,552 chapters. From 1977 to 1981, the program was shown at 5:30 pm, with a repeat the following morning at 8:30 am. From 1982 it changed to 4:45 pm.

In 1983 it started to be shown at 12:00, returning to 16:45 in 1984. In 1985 and 1986, the last seasons, it returned at 17:30. In 1996, Rede Globo, reprised the episodes "As Caçadas de Pedrinho" and "A Chave do Tamanho", referring to the 1981 season, within TV Colosso.

With the end of the original exhibition by Globo in 1986, TVE Brasil reprised the program from 1986 to 1988, with some episodes from 1979 to 1984, among them: O Curupira, Quem Quiser Que Conte Outra, Olhos de Retros, O Gênio da Lâmpada, Emília, Romeo and Juliet, A Santa do Pau Oco, Não Era Uma Vez, The Hen that lays the Golden Eggs, The Mask of the Future, Rapunzel, Cuca's Great Revenge, Journey to Heaven, Robson Crusoe, The Talking Donkey and The Emilia's Ark.

Between October 1994 and May 1998, TVE reruns Sítio, together with TV Cultura, this time showing episodes from 1977 and 1978, among them: A Cuca Vai Pegar, O Minotauro, Memórias da Emília, Os Piratas do Captain Hook, Who Has Mouth Goes to Rome, João Pretend, The Little Angel with the Broken Wing, Peninha - The Invisible Boy, The Terrible Roca Bird, Crazy Cupid, The Other Side of the Moon, The Miraculous Root, Atomic Reign and The Death of the Viscount.

From 2008 to 2010, Globo Marcas released 1 episode of Sítio per year, among them: Memórias da Emília, O Minotauro and Reinações de Narizinho.

It is being rerun on Viva on March 1, 2021 to September 2, 2022 on Channel mornings at 10:30 am. The series has become one of the network's most requested products since its founding in 2010.

In Portugal, the first year (1977) premiered on RTP in 1981. The remaining years were shown until 1989.

In July 2017, during the school holidays, Memórias da Emília entered the Globoplay catalogue. On October 12, 2017, as part of the special program for Children's Day, Reinações de Narizinho was released. Since then, Sítio do Picapau Amarelo has been gradually made available on the platform.

== Legacy ==
In 1979, UNESCO recognized the series as the best children's program that year.

== Soundtrack ==
=== Sítio do Picapau Amarelo (album) ===
Sítio do Picapau Amarelo

Soundtrack album by Various Artists
- Released: 1977
- Genres: Soundtrack; Latin music; MPB; Children's music
- Language: Brazilian Portuguese
- Label: Som Livre
- Director: Guto Graça Mello
- Producer: Dori Caymmi (executive)

Sítio do Picapau Amarelo is the first soundtrack album for the series, released in 1977 by Som Livre, and contained 13 tracks.

=== Sítio do Picapau Amarelo Vol. 2 (album) ===
Sítio do Picapau Amarelo Vol. 2

Soundtrack album by Various Artists
- Released: 1979
- Recorded: 1977
- Genres: MPB; Children's music
- Language: Brazilian Portuguese
- Label: Som Livre
- Producer: Guto Graça Mello

Sítio do Picapau Amarelo Vol. 2 is the second soundtrack for this series, released in 1979 also by Som Livre, and contained 11 tracks.
