= Brazilian mythology =

Mythical myths of the Brazilian culture

Brazilian mythology is the subset of Brazilian folklore, with cultural elements of diverse origin found in Brazil, comprising folk tales, traditions, characters and beliefs regarding places, people, and entities. The category was originally restricted to indigenous elements, but has been extended to include:

- Medieval Iberic traditions brought by the Portuguese settlers, some of which are forgotten or very diminished in Portugal itself; as well as other European nations folklore, such as Italy, Germany and Poland.
- African traditions brought by Africans to Brazil as slaves during the colonial times—including their religious beliefs;
- Elements originated in Brazil by the contact between the three different traditions;
- Contemporary elements that are re-elaborations of old traditions.

Because Brazil is a melting pot of cultures, many elements of Brazilian mythology are shared by the traditions of other countries, especially its South American neighbors and Portugal.

== Prominent figures ==
- Alemoa – the ghost of a blond (German-like) woman that is connected to the island of Fernando de Noronha. She is said to seduce imprudent men and carry them to death. Alemoa is a nonstandard way of pronouncing "alemã" ("German female" in Portuguese).
- Anhangá – A spirit that often protects animals (especially the females and young ones) and tends to appear as a white deer with red eyes. Often mistaken for Anhanguera due to the words being similar, however, the Anhinga is not considered a devil, though it was feared. One legend involves an indigenous person who tortured a young fawn so the screams would attract the mother. When she came near, he killed her just to realize that the Anhanga had used an illusion and he had just killed his own mother!
- Anhanguera – Name used by the early Jesuit missionaires as an equivalent of the Devil.
- Bernunça – a strange beast of the folk tales of the state of Santa Catarina.
- Besta-fera – a centaur-like creature, thought to be the Devil. The name can be roughly translated as "Feral Beast" or "Bestial Beast".
- Boi-Bumbá is also called Bumba Meu Boi (described below).
- Boitatá – a giant snake with bull horns and enormous fiery eyes that crawls over the open fields at night. Sometimes described as a giant fiery snake. Looking at its eyes blinds people.
- Boiuna ("The Black Snake") – a gigantic, nocturnal serpent that is the personification of the Amazonian rivers and is feared by many anglers who live in that area. As part of the TV show, The River, it is a sacred area and no one is to enter.
- Boto – an Amazon river dolphin encantado that shapeshifts into a handsome man to seduce young women (Amazon). After impregnating them, he would abandon the woman and never return to her village with the same disguise again. This tale was possibly created by single mothers in an attempt to explain away to fatherless children who their fathers were.
- Bumba-meu-Boi – an ox that is part of a folk tale celebrated with dance and music by the peoples of the Brazilian north (states of Maranhão and Amazonas, where it is known as Boi-Bumbá).
- Cabeça Satânica – The wandering head is a widespread Brazilian ghost story of European origin. Appears to people that wander alone in the night as a stranger with its back turned to the victim. Its body melts to the ground and only the head with long hair, wide eyes, and a large mischievous smile remains, hopping or rolling towards the victim. Its name means "Satanic Head" or "Satan's Head".
- Caipora – jungle spirits that lived in trees but came out at night to haunt those who were astray.
- Capelobo – A hybrid weird creature that has the head of a anteater, the torso of a man, and the hindquarters of a goat, This creature brutally attacks and kills his victims, sucking their brains.
- Ci – Tupian primeval goddess (the name means simply "mother").
- Cobra-Grande ("The Big-Snake") – see Boiuna.
- Corpo-Seco ("The Dried-Corpse") – a man so evil that the earth would not rot its flesh and the devil would return his soul. He was condemned to wander fruitlessly the world until the judgment day.
- Cuca – menacing, supernatural, old hag that attacks and tortures small children who do not go to bed early. Her name comes from a very old and obsolete Portuguese word for "skull" or "cruel".
- Curupira – a (male) jungle genie/ Demon of the Forest that protects the animals and the trees of the forests. It has red hair with the capacity to ignite and turn into fire and backward feet to confuse hunters. Hates hunters and lumberjacks. It was the first figure in the history of folklore to be documented in Brazil.
- Encantado ("The Charmed") – someone who is magically trapped in another dimension, living an eternal, but hapless life (usually a punishment for pursuing riches at any cost or doing some wrong).
- Homem do Saco (literally, "Sack Man" or "Bag Man") – a mid-aged or elder drifter who visits households in search of naughty young children for him to carry away with him, in his sack or bag. When the Bag Man happens to knock at a house whose residents have a naughty kid that they no longer want, these parents give the Bag Man their kid, which he puts up in his sack and carries away forever. This story was told to children as a way to make them behave and respect their parents, under the fear of being given away to the Bag Man if they didn't act well.
- Iara – a type of freshwater mermaid (Central-West, Southeast, North).
- Iemanjá – the Afro-Brazilian sea goddess worshiped in umbanda, candomblé and another Afro-Brazilian religions.
- Jaci / Jasy – Tupi-Guarani goddess of the moon, capable of turning people into stars or mermaids.
- Jurupari – a god limited to worship by men, considered a devil by the Jesuits.
- Lobisomem – the Brazilian version of the werewolf.
- M'Boi – Serpentine god of the river. Responsible for the legend of Iguazu Falls, the tragic story of Tarobá and Naipi, a man who fell in love with a woman consecrated to M'Boi. Iguazu Falls are one of the great wonders of the world at the corner of Brazil, Argentina and Paraguay.
- Maní – the name of an indigenous girl with a very fair complexion. The legend is connected to Manioc, a woody shrub of the Euphorbiaceae native to South America.
- Mãe-do-Ouro – a powerful and lethal being that protects gold ores. Nobody has survived seeing it, so no description exists. It is usually seen from afar as a globe of fire that flies from mountain to mountain (Southeast). It can be roughly translated as "Mother of Gold" and it is possibly a popular attempt to explain the ball lightning phenomenon.
- Mapinguari – a bipedal, hairy, one-eyed giant that wanders the Amazon jungle. Considered the Brazilian version of the Yeti or the last memory of the now extinct giant sloths passed through generations by the native peoples of Brazil.
- Matinta Pereira – a malevolent hag with supernatural powers whose legend is very well known in the state of Pará.
- Moura Encantada ("Enchanted Moura") – a beautiful moura shapeshifted into a hideous snake to guard an immense treasure. One who breaks the spell will have the gold and marry the maiden.
- Muiraquitã – a greenish amulet of supernatural qualities connected to the legend of the Icamiabas, the Brazilian Amazons.
- Mula sem Cabeça (literally "Headless Mule") – shape taken by the woman accursed for having sex with a priest (Southeast, Northeast, Central-West, South).
- Mulher de Branco – "Lady in White", also "Woman in White": the most widespread type of ghost seen in Brazil. Urban legend equivalent of the Mexican La Llorona.
- Negrinho do Pastoreio – a slave boy that died an awful death (similar to Candyman's) for not keeping his owner's horses. He helps people who are looking for lost things. Roughly translated as "Black Boy of Farm" or "The Little Black Farmer".
- Pisadeira ("The Stomper") – An old witch who steps on people's bellies at night, leaving them breathless. It usually appears when people go to bed on a full stomach, and is associated with sleep paralysis.
- Romãozinho – an evil boy who bears the burden of immortality, cursed by his own dying mother.
- Saci Pererê – a mischievous single-legged black elf-like creature who is blamed as the culprit of anything that goes wrong at a farm (Central-West, Southeast). The Saci is known as a trickster and usually appears in farms inside wind swirls. If someone steals its red cap he'll exchange it for a favor.
- Uaica
- Vitória Régia – tells the story of the origin of the vitória-régia, the giant water lily, in which a Tupi-Guarani young woman named Naiá falls into a lake and drowns after trying to kiss the reflection of the moon-goddess Jaci, which often turns beautiful virgin girls into stars to be her companions. Moved by the incident, the Moon then transforms her into a different kind of star, a giant water lily, also known as the "Star of the Waters."

== See also ==
- West African mythology
- Luís da Câmara Cascudo, Brazilian folklorist
- Guarani mythology, the native Guarani peoples live in Paraguay and parts of the surrounding areas of Argentina, Brazil, and Bolivia.
