= List of Um Menino Muito Maluquinho episodes =

Below follows a list of episodes of the Brazilian series Um Menino Muito Maluquinho. The series was originally broadcast from March 19 to July 10, 2006 by TVE Brasil, with 26 episodes. From June 26, 2006, the new episodes aired from Monday to Friday at 8 p.m.

== Episodes ==
No.	Title	Original release date
1	"Adivinha Que Dia é Hoje?" "Guess What Day is Today?"	March 16, 2006
In Maluquinho's 10th anniversary, he learns about time. In his fifth anniversary, he needs to dispose of his baby bottle, but he resists. He eventually throws it on the roof.
2	"O Menino que Tinha Panela na Cabeça" "The Boy With a Pan on His Head'"	March 26, 2006
The teacher asks the students to write their autobiography. 10-year-old Maluquinho tries to find his origin, but everyone makes him confused, so he decides to write what he thinks of himself.
3	"O Primeiro Dia de Aula" "First Day of School"	April 2, 2006
10-year-old Maluquinho is about to start a new school year, and he is terrified of Math. 5-year-old Maluquinho is concerned about the life in the new school.
4	"Eu não Sei Arrumar, Eu Só Sei Bagunçar" "I Don't Know How To Clean Up, I Only Know How to Mess Up"	April 9, 2006
10-year-old Maluquinho finally decides to clean his room after he loses a paper with Julieta's phone number on it. At age 5, he must deal with his friend Leandro's nanny, who's crazy for cleaning.
5	"Feio, Bonito!" "Ugly, Beautiful!"	April 16, 2006
A new student named Bianca arrives at school and quickly all the boys fall in love with her. She brushes Maluquinho off by calling him ugly, which makes him become depressed. When Maluquinho's back to school, Bianca is using dental braces and glasses, and apologizes to him. At age 5, Maluquinho and Bocão go to the zoo, and the two end up arguing to judge whether the animals are beautiful or ugly.
6	"O Melhor Amigo do Menino" "A Boy's Best Friend"	April 23, 2006
At age 5, Maluquinho is given a pet dog called Fofinho (Fluffy). But at age 10, Fuffly escapes and Maluquinho wants to find him anyway.
7	"Meu Pior Amigo" "My Worst Friend"	April 30, 2006
At age 10, Maluquinho's cousin, Gregório visits him and Maluquinho is jealous because Bocão doesn't pay attention to him and the two end up fighting.
8	"O Canguru Campeão" "The Champion Kangaroo"	May 7, 2006
To seriously reflect on what they want to be when they grow up, 10-year-olds Maluquinho and Bocão decide to become football players, but they find out the training is very tough.
9	"Liga, Desliga" "Off & On"	May 14, 2006
10-year-old Maluquinho is addicted to video games until his computer is faulty and he snaps, but his friends call him to play elsewhere and he forgets the video game.
10	"O Melancia" "The Watermelon"	May 21, 2006
Bocão tells a 10-year-old Maluquinho that he'll soon have a little sister and he's jealous, but Maluquinho helps him to overcome it by telling a story of when he was 5 years old and he wanted a brother very much. He ended up inventing an imaginary friend, a doppelganger called "Paçoquinha".
11	"Azul e Rosa" "Blue and Pink"	May 28, 2006
After a fight, boys and girls decide to throw parties to prove who is better (boys or girls), while Maluquinho and Julieta try to reconcile them.
12	"Baleia de Rio" "River Whale"	June 4, 2006
Reluctantly, Maluquinho goes to his grandfather's farm with his mother, but after meeting his friend Tatiana there, he changes his mind and the two fall in love with one another.
13	"Festa do Pijama" "Pajama Party"	June 11, 2006
At age 10, Maluquinho throws a successful pajama party, but in the process he remembers another party he threw when he was 5, in which his friend Pedroca left early.
14	"Porquê Comigo" "Why Me?"	June 18, 2006
10-year-old Maluquinho and his friends try to save a new student, Tito, from Herman's bullying.
15	"A Fada-Madrinha do Consumo" "The Fairy Godmother of Consumption"	June 25, 2006
After failing to get the "Super-Hyper Adventures Vest" they wanted, 10-year-olds Maluquinho, Junim and Bocão invent an imaginary contest called "The Fairy Godmother of Consumption", in which they can have all the toys they want. However, they learn a lesson about consumerism.
16	"Maluquinho Galã" "Maluquinho Heartthrob"	June 26, 2006
Arriving late at school, Maluquinho picks up a working group with girls only. During the work, he kisses Mari, holds Julieta's hand and hugs Carol, which causes them to become angry and ask who is his girlfriend. He says he only wants the three of them as friends, and in the end everything's fine. In class, Maluquinho is praised by the other girls. At age 5, Maluquinho is spoiled by his great-aunts.
17	"Vovô, Papai e Eu" "Grandpa, Dad and I"	June 27, 2006
At age 5, Maluquinho gives a clay duck to his father on Father's Day, but he loses it and Maluquinho is disappointed. At age 10, Maluquinho won't care for Father's Day because of this fact.
18	"Chove, Chuva Maluquista" "It Rains, Maluquista Rain"	June 28, 2006
At age 5, due to rain, Maluquinho, Bocão and grandfather Hortêncio cannot go to the beach, and Hortêncio has the idea to introduce the children to the world of MPB. At age 10, the family had to cancel their fishery due to similar reasons, and Maluquinho's father, Pedro, introduces him to art history.
19	"O Ilusionista" "The Illusionist"	June 29, 2006
Maluquinho tries to hide from his mother a low grade in mathematics and he remembers he did something similar at age 5, stealing Carol's pencil case and Junim's cap.
20	"Eu Sou o Melhor" "I Am The Best"	June 30, 2006
At age 5, Maluquinho locks himself in the bathroom after losing a card game against Mrs. Irene, Bocão and Junim, who complain that he doesn't stand losing. But at age 10 he snubs his friends after winning a race. The one who lost the race would do the champion's homework.
21	"Fome de Doce" "Sweet Tooth"	July 3, 2006
At age 5, Maluquinho undergoes a sweet tooth and ends up developing two cavities. With that, his mother goes to strictly control the boy's eating habits. At 10, he must learn to like Japanese food, as his grandfather has just returned from Japan and asks for a Japanese dinner to celebrate.
22	"Mãe Só Há Duas" "There Are Only Two Mothers"	July 4, 2006
At age 10, Maluquinho wants to return to a camp that had gone to when he was 5, but his mother won't let him for two reasons: at age 5, Maluquinho went to the same camp and became sad without his mother nearby and due to his low grade in mathematics.
23	"Flicts"	July 5, 2006
Maluquinho's class enacts the play Flicts, based on Ziraldo's book, who appears in a cameo.
24	"Mas... Para onde Foi o Peixe?" "But... Where Is The Fish?"	July 6, 2006
Herman's grandfather dies, and Maluquinho tries to comfort him. Then he is also afraid that their relatives die. At age 5, Maluquinho gets a fish that dies when he leaves home, and his mother tries to hide it.
25	"Feliz Natal" "Happy Christmas"	July 7, 2006
At age 5, Maluquinho discovers that Santa Claus does not exist. That's when his father tries to deliver the gifts dressed as Santa Claus, but fails. At age 10, Maluquinho doesn't get what he wanted for Christmas.
26	"Eu, Eu, Eu e o Mar" "Me, Myself, I and the Sea"	July 10, 2006
The three Maluquinhos, 5, 10 and 30 years old go to the same beach and meet each other by chance.

== See also ==
- Um Menino Muito Maluquinho
- O Menino Maluquinho
- Ziraldo
