= Fernando Alves =

Fernando Alves may refer to:

- Fernando Alves (footballer, born 1979), Equatoguinean football centre-back
- Fernando Alves (footballer, born 1984), Uruguayan football attacking midfielder
