= Apinayé =

Apinayé or Apinajé may refer to:

- Apinayé people, an ethnic group of Brazil
- Apinayé language, a language of Brazil
