= Um Menino Muito Maluquinho =

- Genre: Sitcom, adventure, comedy
- Based on: O Menino Maluquinho by Ziraldo Alves Pinto
- Developed by: Cao Hamburger; Anna Muylaert
- Screenplay by: Anna Muylaert
- Directed by: César Rodrigues
- Starring: Felipe Severo; Pedro Saback; Fernando Alves Pinto; Maria Mariana; Eduardo Galvão; Ilva Niño
- Narrated by: Fernando Alves Pinto
- Country of origin: Brazil
- Original language: Portuguese
- No. of seasons: 1
- No. of episodes: 26 (list of episodes)

Production
- Camera setup: Multi camera
- Running time: 30 minutes

Original release
- Network: TVE Brasil
- Release: March 19 – July 10, 2006

Um Menino Muito Maluquinho was a Brazilian children's show, produced and aired by TVE Brasil and was originally broadcast from 19 March to 10 July 2006. The series was based on book of the same name by Brazilian cartoonist Ziraldo, with 26 episodes and one season. It was directed by César Rodrigues. Cao Hamburger and Anna Muylaert wrote the screenplay. Muyalert is also author of some of the character's books.

The series focuses on the adventures of the fictional protagonist, Maluquinho, and his friends at 5 and 10 years of age, which covers topics about art, time, friendship, school and other aspects of life, usually narrated by a 30-year old Maluquinho. The series received positive reviews from television critics, earned high ratings, and has won some awards, such as Japan's NHK Japan Prize award. It was also nominated for an International Emmy Award for Best Children and Youth program in 2007.

== Plot ==
The story follows two timelines: Maluquinho's life at 5 and 10 years, while being narrated by his 30-year old version. They teach important lessons about art, consumerism, value of money, time, friendship, school and other aspects of life.

Sometimes, the characters give their opinion about a current event or foreshadow some event that will eventually take place in the episode, speaking to the cameras, in front of a white wall.

== Cast ==
Cast of 5-year old Maluquinho's story

- Felipe Severo as Menino Maluquinho
- Rafael Ritto as Bocão
- Myla Christie Bonifácio as Julieta
- Luiz Eduardo Dias as Junim
- Alexandro Domingos as Lúcio
- Eduardo Akira as Sugiro
- Eduardo Aiella as Herman
- Thiago Marcelo Magalhães as Pedroca

Cast of 10-tear old Maluquinho's story

- Pedro Saback as Menino Maluquinho
- Cristian Zucolotto as Bocão
- Sarah Maciel as Julieta
- Júlia Mattos as Bianca
- Gabriel Sequeira as Junim
- Andrey Emerich as Lúcio
- Felipe Santos as Fred
- Leonam Akira as Sugiro
- Vinícius Kubrusly as Herman
- Maria Clara Mendonça as Carolina
- Karolina Afonso as Pagu
- Rayane Menezes as Vera
- Fellipe Thuler as Pedroca
- Rita de Cássia de Oliveira as Renata
- Mariana Azevedo as Mariana

Adult cast

- Fernando Alves Pinto as 30-year old Menino Maluquinho
- Maria Mariana as Ana (Maluquinho's mother)
- Eduardo Galvão as Pedro (Maluquinho's father)
- Antônio Pedro as Seu Hortêncio (Maluquinho's grandfather)
- Ilva Niño as Irene (maid)
- Clarice Niskier as Paula (Teacher)
- Ellen Rocche as Fairy Godmother
- Luiz Nicolau as Baiaco

== Production ==
Filming lasted six months and were done in a studio of 600 square meters, which had a full floor, with Maluquinho's room, his parents' room, a living room, a kitchen and a bathroom. Most of the furniture the art direction decided to use was old in order to convey the reality of a house.

== Broadcast ==
The series premiered on March 19, 2006 on TVE Brasil with new episodes every Sunday at 6:30 p.m. It was moved to Fridays at 11:30 a.m. and 2 p.m., and on Saturdays at 10 a.m. On July 2, 2006, TVE Brasil broadcast a binge-watch of ten episodes from 9h to 14h. Another novelty was the change in the broadcast schedule, with new episodes airing from June 26, 2006 from Monday to Friday at 8 p.m.

On 24 March 2006, the series premiered on TV Cultura with new episodes every Fridays at 2 p.m (later with reruns on Thursdays at 10 a.m.). The program stopped airing on TV Cultura on January 25, 2008.

On December 4, 2006, the series premiered on Disney Channel from Monday to Friday at 12 p.m.
It was broadcast on TV Brasil from September 26, 2011 to January 20, 2013.

The series aired on TV Escola from April 1, 2013 on Saturdays and Sundays. The program is no longer broadcast as of December 1, 2014, due to the new programming schedule of the network.

== Awards and nominations ==
Academy	Award		Result	Reference
Academy	Category	Date	Result	Reference
NHK Japan Prize	The Best Program in Early Education	2006	Won	
Associação Paulista de Críticos de Arte	Best Children TV Show	2006	Won	
Divercine	International Film Festival for Children and Youth	2006	Won	
CinePort 2006	Film Festival of Portuguese Language	2006	Nominated	
2007 International Emmy Awards	Best Children's Program	2007	Nominated	
