= Turma do Pererê =

Brazilian comic book series

- The protagonists of the Turma do Pererê.

Publication information
- Publisher: Editora Abril (1975-76); Editora Globo (2010)
- Schedule: Monthly
- Format: Comic book
- Genre: Comedy
- Publication date: 1959 – 1976

Creative team
- Created by: Ziraldo Alves Pinto
- Written by: Ziraldo Alves Pinto

Turma do Pererê, or just Pererê, was a Brazilian comic book series created by writer and cartoonist Ziraldo in 1959. The series was originally launched in single-panel cartoons originally published in the pages of magazine O Cruzeiro that through their popularity eventually earning his own comic book in 1960 then called only "Pererê", one of the first children's comic books series in Brazil. The comics tagged generation among many Brazilians, but were eventually canceled in 1964, only returning to be published in 1975 by Abril with the current title "Turma do Pererê" which was canceled the following year and shall have only republications in subsequent years, until 1980 when he dedicated to the comics of the Menino Maluquinho.

The stories showed the adventures of Saci Pererê (a character of Brazilian folklore) and his friends who live in the Brazilian interior forest known as Mata do Fundão.

== Characters ==
- Pererê - The title character of the series, being a Saci who lives in Fundão. Unlike the Sacis of folklore, Pererê is characterized by being more domesticated, preferring not to cause pranks, however, he is always having fun with his friends and often walks inside whirlpools. In one of the comics it is revealed that he was born from a black flower planted by Mãe Docelina, whom he sees as a mother figure. He is usually just referred to as Saci by his friends.
- Tininim - An indigenous Brazilian boy that is Pererê's best friend. He is very sensitive, paranoid and fearful, he often gets into trouble from which he always needs his friend's help to help him, especially Pererê. One of his main fears are the diseases.
- Galileu, a white jaguar with brown spots. He is characterized by being the biggest and strongest of the group and tends to star in his own stories, often having Compadre Tonico and Seu Neném as antagonists. He is constantly hunted by the two farmers who often create plans to try to capture him, but Galileu always manages to beat them in the end and punishes them by beating them. In the original concept he was quadrupedal and used to be yellow like a real jaguar, but during development he became bipedal and white as a way to facilitate the art.
- Geraldinho, a red rabbit. He is the youngest of the group and usually stars in stories about his naivety and antics.
- Moacir, a pink tortoise. Among his friends, he is the only one who works and is a postman. Despite being a tortoise, he is often seen running around and making deliveries.
- Alan, a monkey
- Pedro Vieira, a pink armadillo
- Joao-de-Barro Pimentel and his wife Quiquica, a bird couple
- Boneca, Pererê's girlfriend. She is an Afro-Brazilian girl who wears a red dress and a hair with two pigtails big red bows. She is the daughter of farmer Seu Nereu and most of the time she is seen walking with her best friend Tuiuiú.
- Tuiuiú, Tininim's girlfriend. She is an indigenous girl, however unlike Tininim she is more civilized wearing a blue dress and is often seen walking with her best friend Boneca.
- Compadre Tonico and Seu Neném, two farmers who usually act as antagonists for Galileu. They often create plans in each story to try to trick Galileu and capture him in a similar way to Elmer Fudd with Bugs Bunny, but they are always unmasked and defeated by him who beats them down. They rarely call Galileu by name, always referring to him as "The Jaguar".
- Professor Nogueira, a wise yellow owl. He serves as a tutor to the children, often teaching them moral lessons.
- Mãe Docelina, an Afro-Brazilian lady who lives alone in a house in the middle of the countryside, but who appears to be very kind to the residents of Fundão. She is often seen cooking and making sweets. The character is a little reminiscent of Tia Nastácia from Sitio do Picapau Amarelo.
- Rufino and Flecha Firme, Pererê and Tininim's rivals. Both are naughty boys who often compete for Boneca and Tuiuiú's attention and affections. Rufino is an Afro-Brazilian boy (having brown skin, unlike Pererê and Boneca) and Flecha Firme is a blue-skinned indigenous boy.

== Adaptations ==
With the legacy of the series on October 12, 1983 Rede Globo produced a live-action television special in celebration of Children's Day. The special musical served as the basis of inspiration for a TV series that was produced in 1998 with the same structure produced by the channel TVE Brasil (current TV Brasil) which was broadcast from 2002 to 2004, when the channel started to dedicate a series of Menino Maluquinho. For some years, it was also broadcast on TV Cultura.

In 2011, celebrating 50 years of comics were announced a film in animation and his return to comics, but so far nothing has been confirmed. In the same year the TV series gained new episodes this time with new actors acting characters.

== Commercial use ==
In the late 1980s, Ziraldo was commissioned to redesign the mascots of major Brazilian soccer teams in his signature art style, the mascot for Sport Club Internacional, a saci, was drawn with the exact same design as the character from Pererê (except for wearing the team uniform), which helped boost the mascot's popularity. Since then, the team has alternated between using Ziraldo's version or an original version of the Saci as their mascot.

== Reception ==
Pererê is considered one of the most important Brazilian comics to be remembered throughout generations. The comic is often referred to for having innovated when seeking to explore themes of Brazilian folklore, fauna and culture (one of them for being to explore the mythological creature Saci in the media), as well as the fact that it was the first Brazilian children's magazine entirely in color, serving as an inspiration for other future Brazilian comics.

As it was one of the most important works in Ziraldo's career, Pererê's characters are often referenced in other works by the author. One of them occurs in the first O Menino Maluquinho film.
