= Karajá =

Indigenous people of Brazil

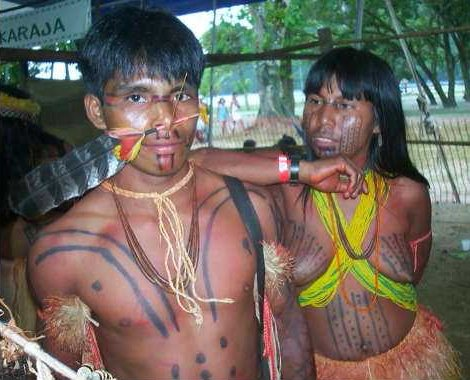

Total population
- 2,500-3,000

Regions with significant populations
- Brazil

Languages
- Karajá language

Religion
- traditional tribal religion

The Karajá, also known as Iny, are an Indigenous tribe located in Brazil.

== Territory ==
Karajá people live in a 180-mile-long area in central Brazil, in the states of Goiás, Mato Grosso, Pará, and Tocantins. They currently reside in 29 villages in the Araguaia River valley, near lakes and tributaries to the Araguaia and Javaés Rivers, and the Ilha do Bananal.

== Population ==
Earlier in the 20th century, there were 45,000 Karajá. In 1999, there were 2500–3000 Karajá. Today, they number around 3200-3700 people, all living in 20 different villages (Instituto Socioambiental, 2016; Museu do Índio 2016).

== History ==
In 1673 the tribe first encountered European explorers. The Karajá first encountered the Europeans through two interactions, one with Jesuit missionaries as early as 1658 (Ribeiro, 2012; Museu do Índio, 2016) and the second with groups of bandeirantes throughout the 1600s (Ribeiro 2012). These bandeirantes were explorers, mainly from São Paulo, who went in search of gold and slaves. In their exploration of the interior of Brazil they came across the Karajá and used violence in order to confront and control them (Ribeiro, 2012; Museu do Índio, 2016). In 1811, the Portuguese Empire, based in Rio de Janeiro at the time, waged war against the Karajá and neighboring tribes. The Karajá and Xavante retaliated by destroying the presidio of Santa Maria do Araguia in 1812. More recently, the Karajá have been subject to renewed interest in areas west of the Araguaia River (Ribeiro, 2012), known as the ‘March to the West’. During this period, the area attracted the likes of anthropologists, governors, and presidents of the republic (Ribeiro 2012; Instituto Socioambiental, 2016). During the mid-20th century, the tribe was overseen by Brazil's federal Indian bureau, the Serviço de Proteção aos Índios or SPI.

In the 1980s and 1990s, the Karajá community leader, Idjarruri Karaja, campaigned for better education, land rights, and employment opportunities for the tribe. Karaja also brought electricity and telecommunications to the tribe in 1997.

These contacts with outsiders has resulted in cultural exchange to the extent that many Iny have now integrated themselves into Brazilian society, dominating the Portuguese language and working in official government roles (Museu do Índio, 2016). The Karajá language is one aspect of Iny culture where this exchange is visible. The Iny to this day have loan words that are taken from Língua Geral (Ribeiro, 2012). This was a hybrid language between European Portuguese and native languages that facilitated communication between these two groups. In addition, the Iny have a set of loan words from other indigenous communities due to repeated contact with groups such as the Tapirapé and the Kaiapó (Ribeiro, 2012).

== Language ==
They speak the Karajá language, which is part of the Macro-Jê language family. It was suggest as being a part of this family as early as 1886 but remained as an unclassified language for the majority of the 20th century until around 1967 (Ribeiro, 2012, p. 268). The language has four dialects: Northern Karajá, Southern Karajá, Javaé, and Xambioá. Within these dialects, there are differences in speech between males and females (Ribeiro, 2012; Insituto Socioambiental, 2016). The Karajá language is generally the first language spoken by children, indicating that the majority (if not all) of people are fluent speakers of the language (Museu do Índio, 2016).

== Economy ==
Although they are known as one of Brazil's poorest tribes, they are self-sufficient. Their livelihood is based upon agriculture and craft work. Crops are diverse and include bananas, beans, manioc, maize, peanuts, potatoes, watermelons, and yams. Fishing is also highly important, as is hunting. Ceramics dolls are commonly made for export.

== Culture and arts ==
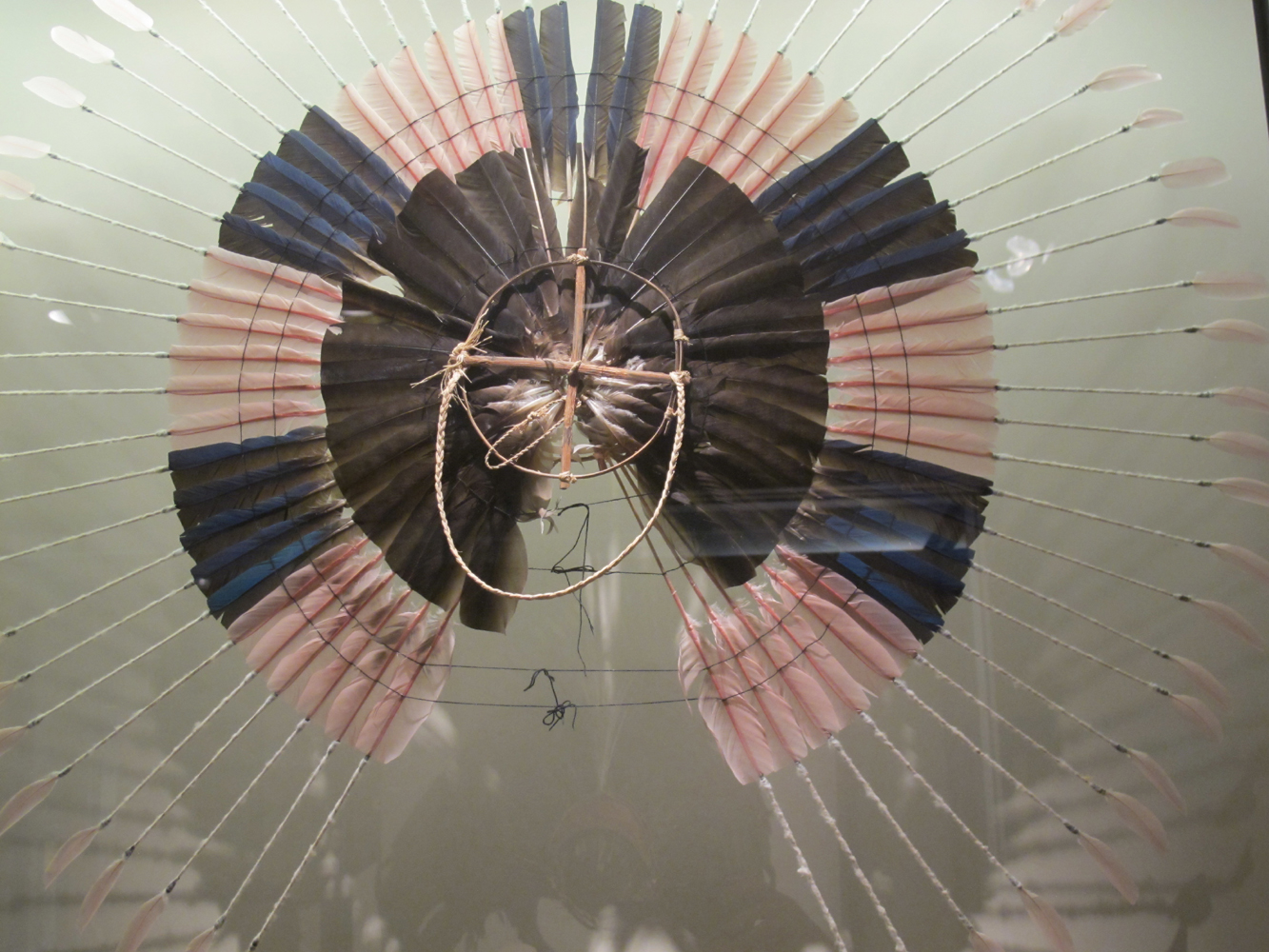
Karajá feather headdress from Mato Grosso, Muséum d'Histoire naturelle de La Rochelle

Karajá are highly mobile people. Families often build temporary fishing camps. During the dry season, the tribe hosts festivals. In the rainy seasons, families move to villages on high ground. They employ swidden or slash-and-burn techniques in farming. Men govern group decision-making and negotiation with outside groups, such as NGOs.

Body painting still thrives as an art among Karajá, with women specializing in this medium, which employ paints made from genipap juice, charcoal, and annatto dye. Both women and men weave baskets, while only women create ceramics. Karajá excel at feather work.

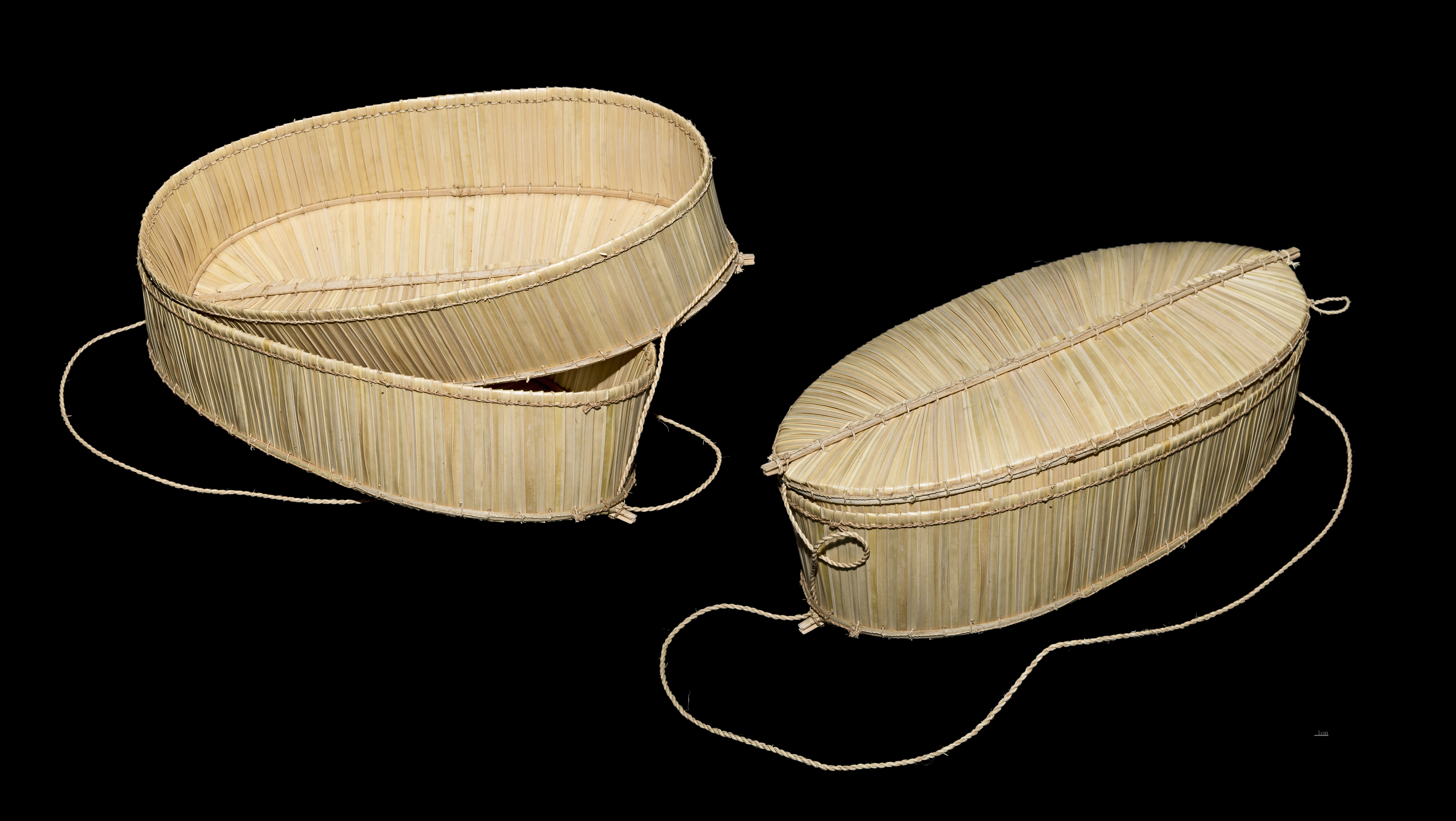
Cart art lid "Warabahu" MHNT

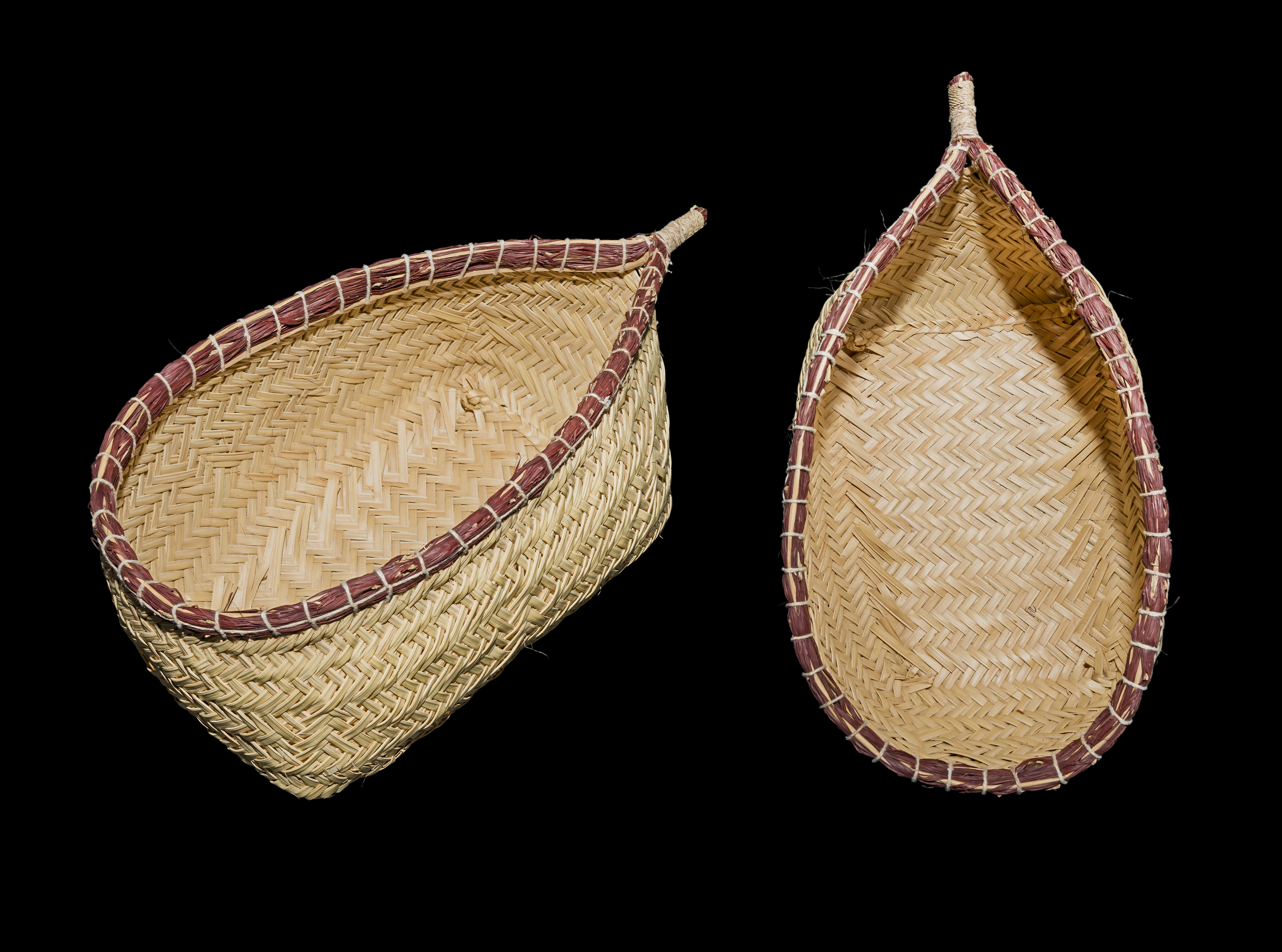
Cart art lid "tarirana" MHNT

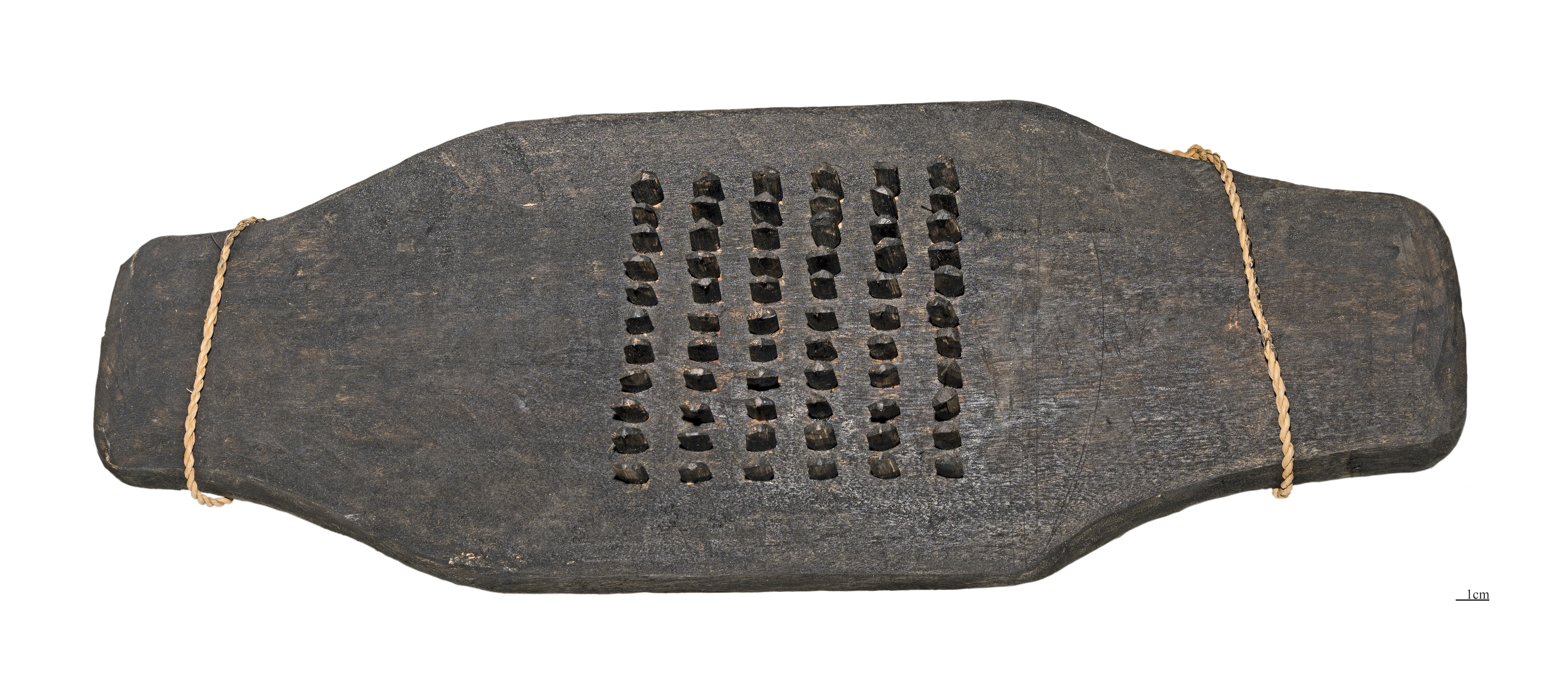
"Orana" - Cassava grater MHNT

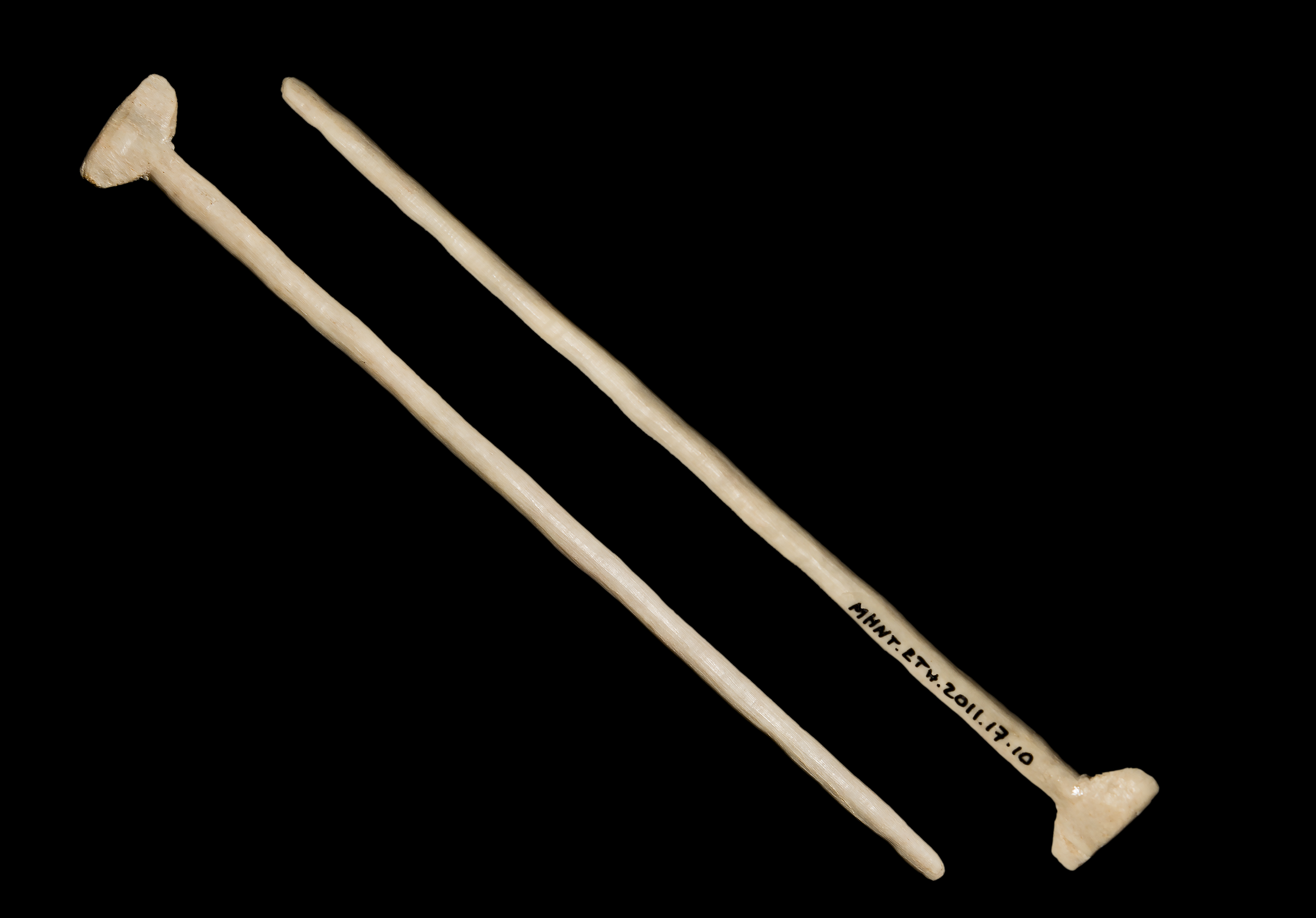
"Holua" - Vertical labret MHNT

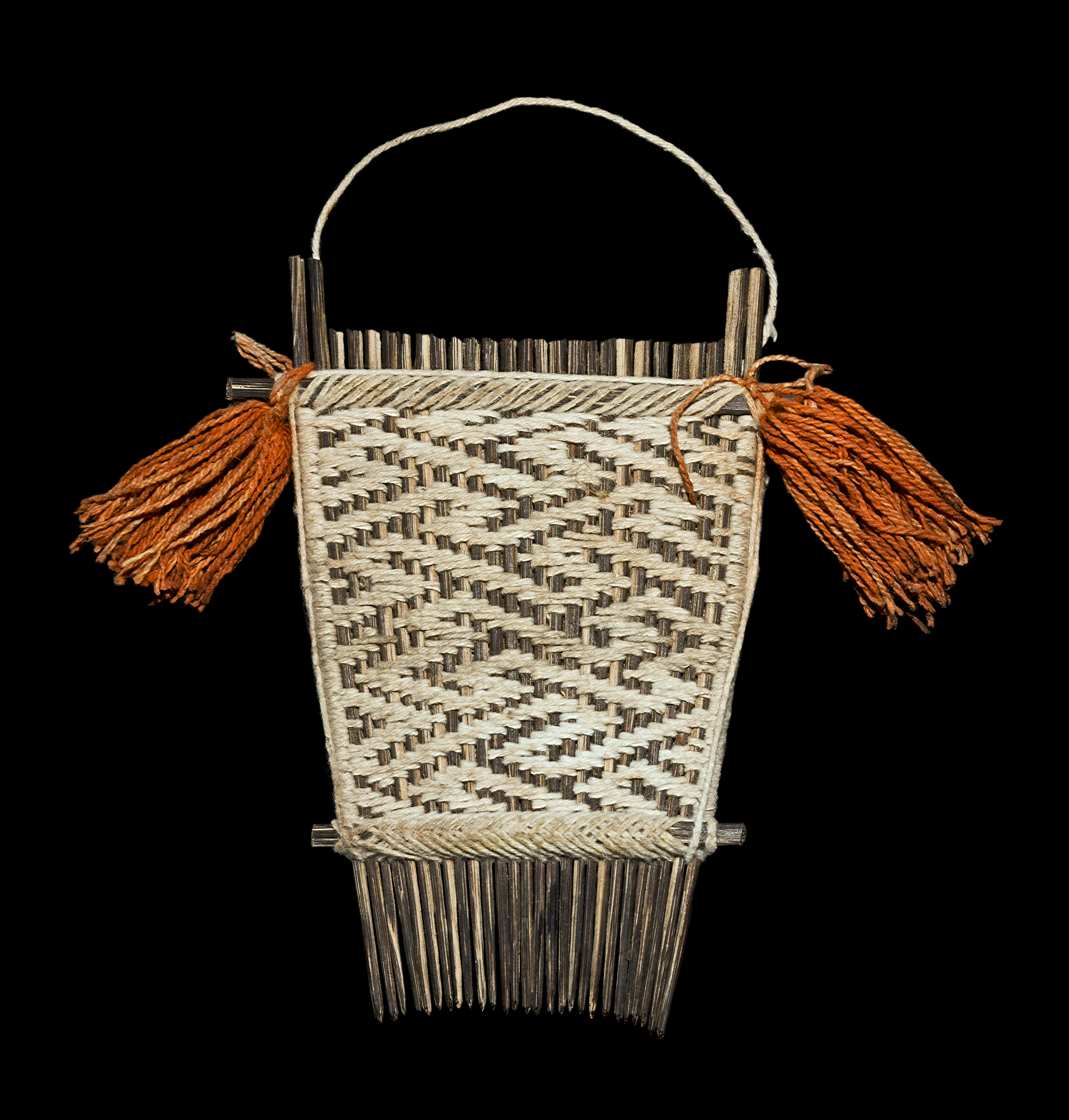
“Siho” comb MHNT

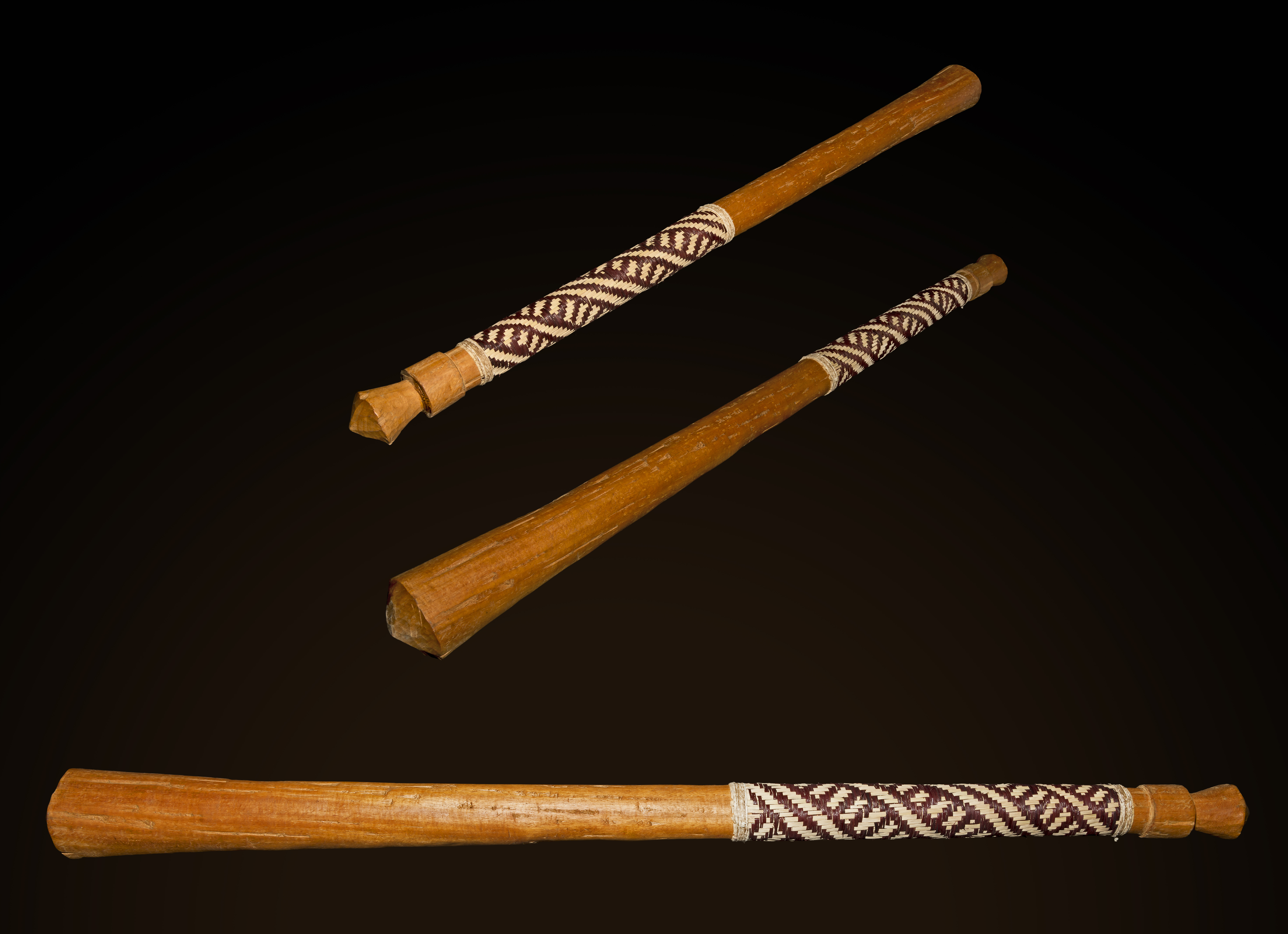
Mace "Otote" MHNT

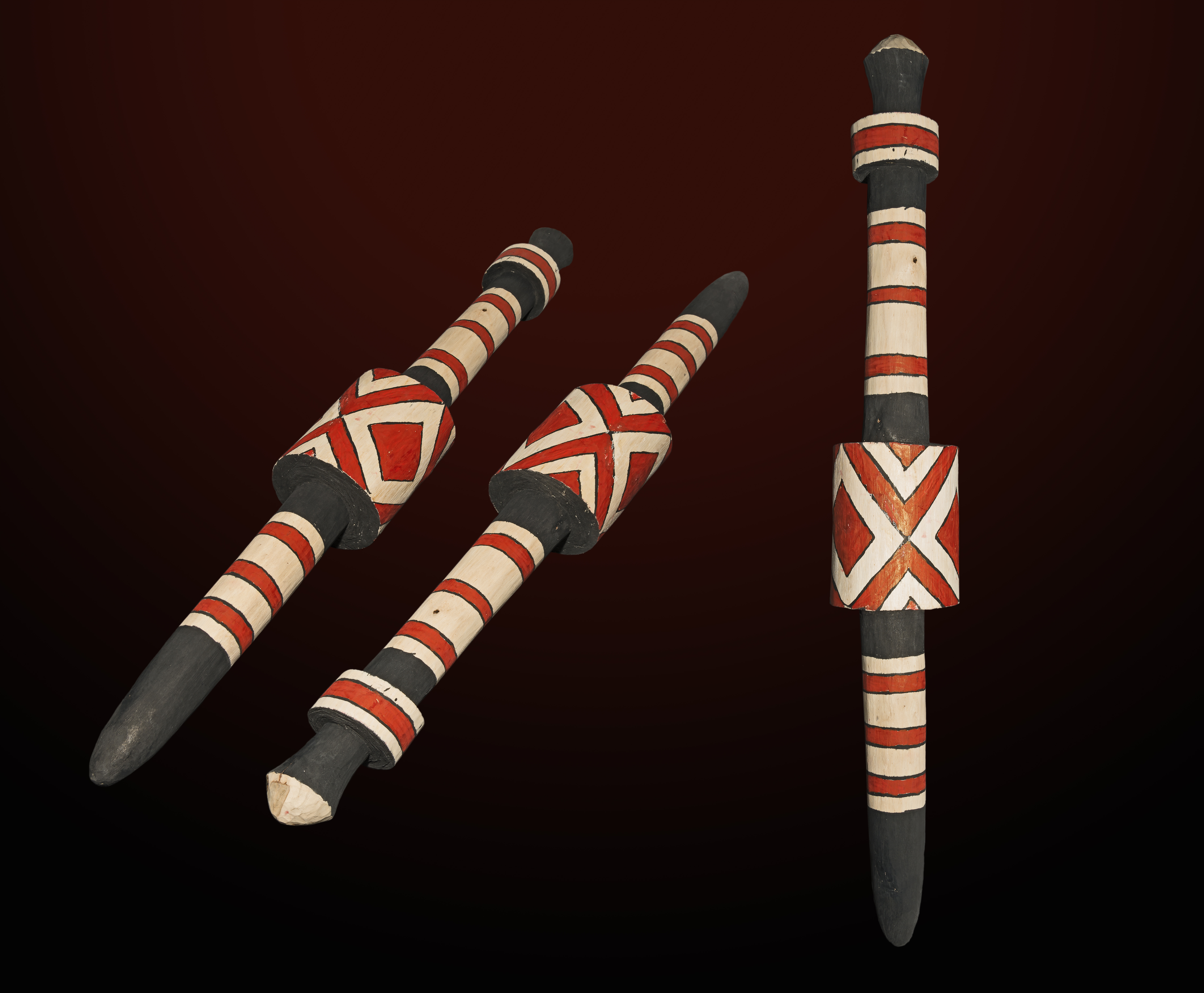
Funeral pile "itxeo"

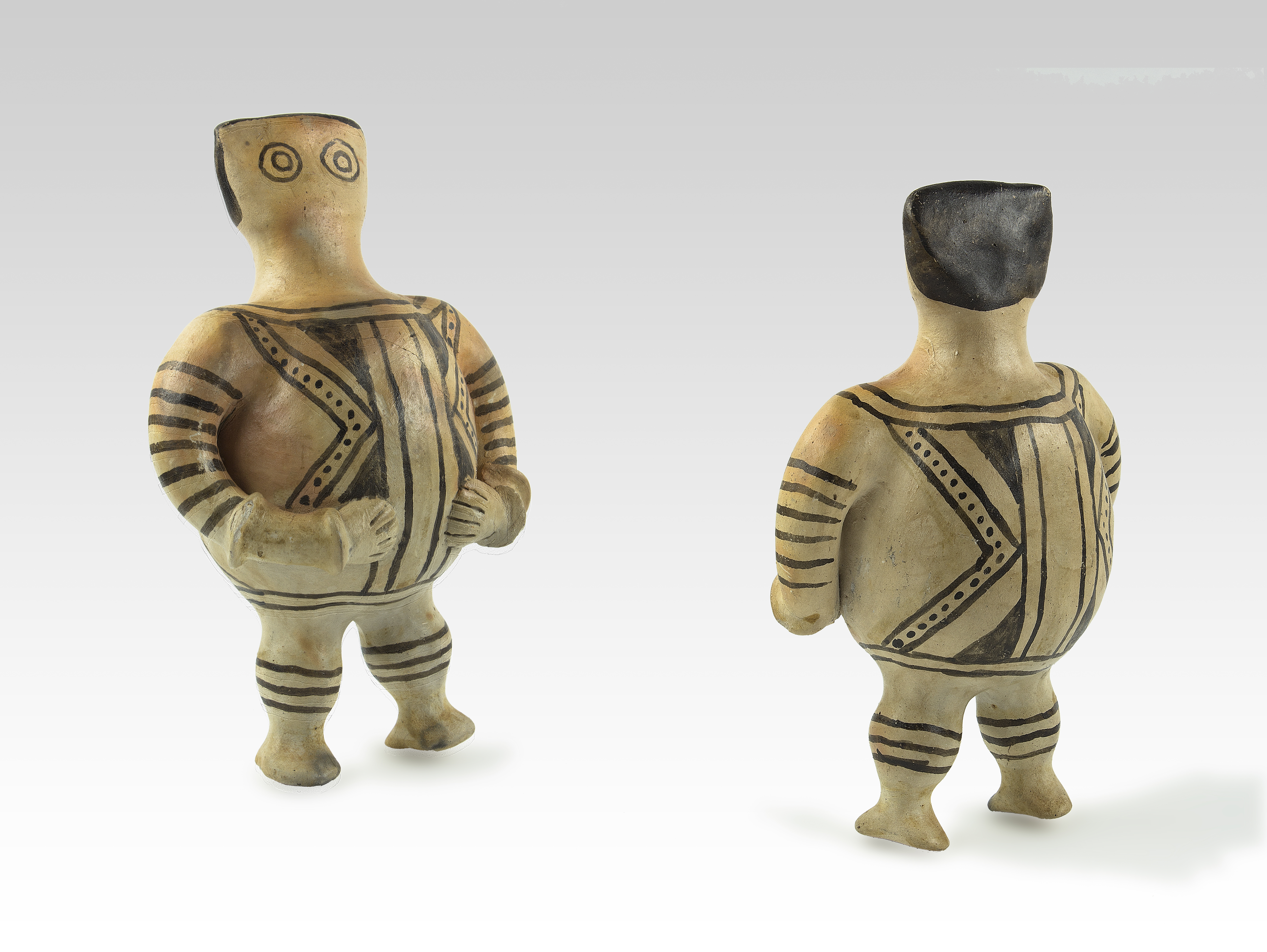
Ceramic statuette MHNT

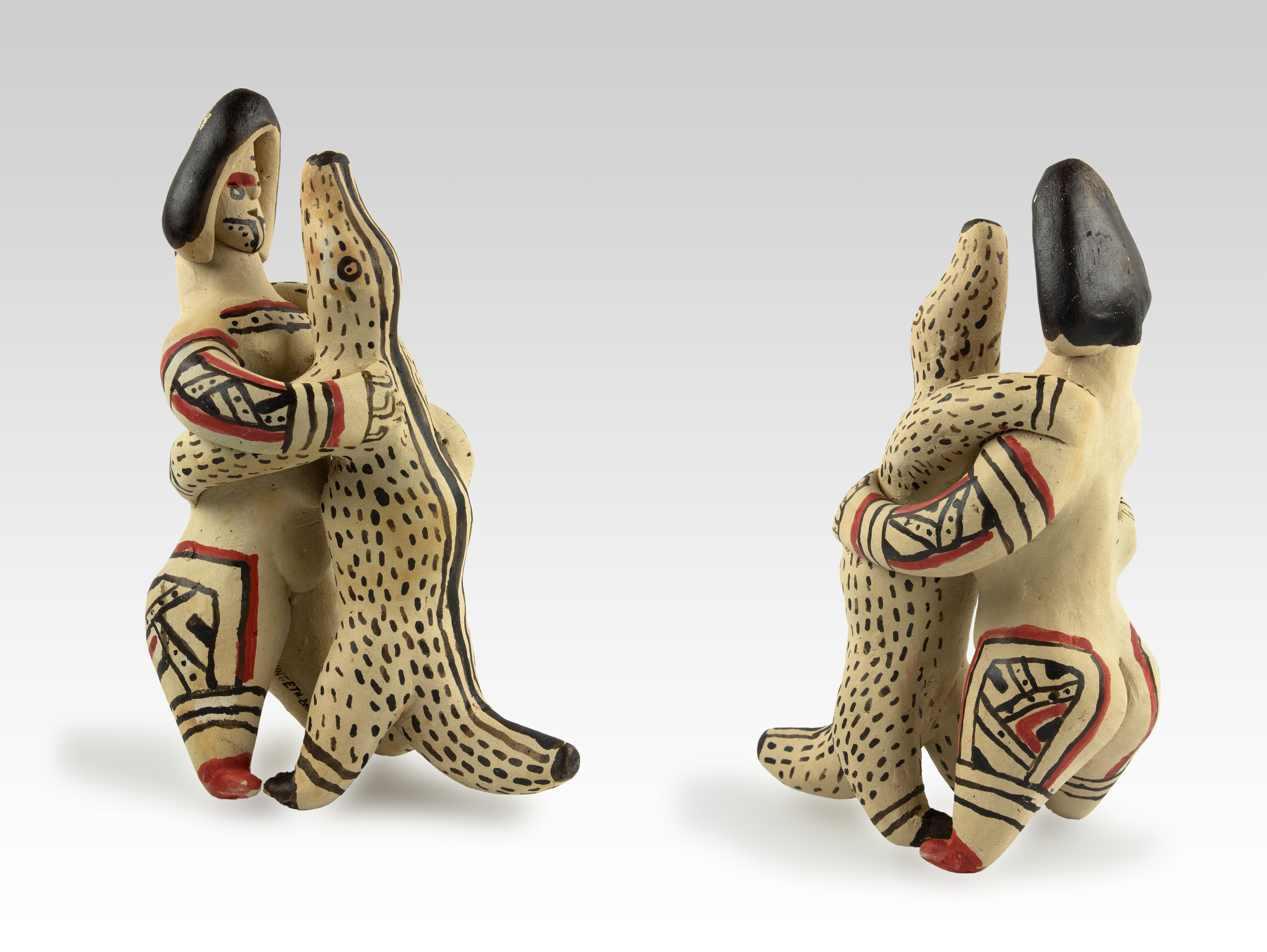
woman with cayman – MHNT

== Research ==
There have been a number of studies done regarding the Karajá (Fortune & Fortune, 1963; Viana, 1995) such as the thorough and detailed descriptive grammar provided by Eduardo Rivail Ribeiro in the Department of Linguistics through the University of Chicago (2012). This descriptive grammar provided by Ribeiro focuses on the phonological and morphological characteristics of the Karajá language. In the phonological context, Ribeiro writes about language characteristics such as syllable patterns, stress placement, inventory, and consonants, among others. In terms of morphology, Ribeiro focuses on word-formation, verbs, and nouns, among others. In addition, one of the interesting focuses of this descriptive grammar is the difference in speech that is present between males and females (Ribeiro, 2012). This is ultimately not a major difference in the styles of speech but a slight one, such as the inclusion of the letter ‘k’ in some words of the female form of speech. Additional studies on the Karajá include the study of Marcus Maia (2010) who looks at various aspects of Karajá grammar including interrogative constructions, evidentials, hierarchy, and complementizers and the study done by Fulop and Warren (2014) which focuses on the presence of advanced tongue root in the Karajá vocalic system.

There has been a documentation project done on the Karajá culture and language by the Museo do Índio, coordinated by Cristiane Oliveira through ProDocLín (2016). The project aimed to increase and digitalize data on Karajá language and culture. In addition, the project aimed to create material that can be used in the future to preserve and encourage the safekeeping of the language (such as an encyclopedic dictionary). Members of the project worked with community members in order to teach them techniques in how to use different forms of media and equipment that would aim them in their goal of preserving their language and culture (Museu do Índio, 2016). Beyond language documentation, additional ethnographies include the work of do Socorro Pimentel da Silva (2014) which looks at the negative effects of Portuguese in Karajá culture, such as language endangerment, and the work of Marcus Maia (2001) which also looks at bilingualism within Karajá society but through the lens of the educational system present within Karajá communities.

== See also ==
- Uaica, hunter in Karajá legend
