= Flicts =

1969 picture book by Ziraldo

- Author: Ziraldo
- Illustrator: Ziraldo
- Language: Portuguese
- Genre: Picture book
- Publisher: Melhoramentos
- Publication date: 1969
- Publication place: Brazil
- Pages: 48

Flicts is a picture book written and illustrated by Brazilian author Ziraldo. The first children's book by the author, published in 1969, it tells the story of a color known as Flicts, that does not seem to fit anywhere on planet Earth alongside the other colors.

== Background ==
According to Ziraldo's daughter, Daniela Thomas, the book was conceived when the author, in search of help to publish his comic Jeremias, o Bom, approached editor Fernando de Castro Ferro, who asked Ziraldo if he instead had a children's book ready to be published. He lied and said yes, and spent the next two days designing what would become Flicts.

== Major themes ==
Published in 1969 during the military dictatorship in Brazil, some national authors, such as Pedro Bandeira and Roger Mello, have compared the feeling of exclusion felt by the book's protagonist to the persecution of artists during that time by the government.

== Reception ==
Brazilian poet Carlos Drummond de Andrade published a review of Flicts on Jornal do Brasil where he called it "wonderful", saying he lacked the words to truly define what the book was, concluding by saying that's "exactly one of the wonders of Flicts: it doesn't need defining. It is."
