= Saci (folklore) =

Character in Brazilian folklore

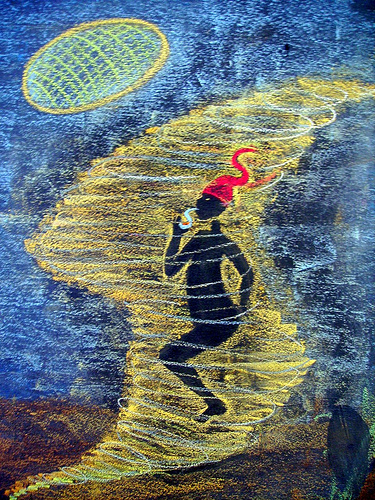
Portrait of the Saci-pererê (2007) by J. Marconi.

Saci (pronounced [saˈsi]) is a character in Tupi and Guarani folklore. He is a one-legged black boy, who smokes a pipe and wears a magical red cap that enables him to disappear and reappear wherever he wishes (usually in the middle of a dirt devil). Considered an annoying prankster in most parts of Brazil, and a potentially dangerous and malicious creature in others, he nevertheless grants wishes to anyone who manages to trap him or steal his magic cap. Legend says that a person can trap a Saci inside a bottle when he is in the form of a dust devil (see Fig. right where he is portrayed in the center of the whirlwind).

The Saci legend is seen as a combination of native Tupi lore with African-Brazilian and European myth or superstition combined into it. Also, much of the currently told folklore about the Saci is traceable to what writer Monteiro Lobato collected and published in 1917–1918, and the children's book version he created and published in 1921.

According to present-day folklore, this genie can be captured and trapped inside a corked bottle to grant the wishes of its master, or its magic can be acquired by stealing its cap (§ Capturing and subjugating), and the sulfuric smell about the black genie is emphasized, leading to criticism of racism. (Note: Cf. Queiroz under § Origin theories.)

== Etymology ==
The term saci derives from Tupinambá: çaci meaning "sick eye", (Note: According to Teodoro Sampaio.) or rather Tupinambá: çua ci "evil eye". The suffixed -pererê also derives from Tupinambá perérég meaning "bouncy, jumpy". (Note: Though the correct form is "-taperê" (Çacy-taperê or Maty-taperê in the north), or so insists Barbosa Rodrigues (1890), later corrupted to Saci-pererê, etc., by European redactors, according to .) The Saci-pererê of myth originally referred to a Cuculiformes (cuckoo family) bird, more specifically the striped cuckoo.

German ethnologist Horst H. Figge, who sees extensive influence of African Umbanda religion in Brazilian culture, has argued that Saci-Cerere can be explained as deriving from Ewe language asiɖẽɖẽ "one hand", while the form Matimpererê was even more amenable to interpretation as Ewe matĩ-[a]fɔɖeɖẽ "without one foot".

Saci-pererê is also known variously as saci-sapererê, -sererê, -saperê, -siriri; saci-triqué; saci-mofera, etc. (Note: Additionally: Çacy-Pererê, -Sareré, Matim-taperê.) Eventually the name became fully Portuguesized to Matinta-Pereira, (Note: The Matinta-Pereira is sometimes described only as a wizard.) later even earned surnames and called Matinta-Pereira da Silva or -da Matta.

== Description ==
The saci legend as currently known is a composite of folklore and superstition from native Amerindian, Black Brazilian, and European myth and superstition. It also appears in Sítio do Picapau Amarelo (cf. § Origin theories).

One informant spoke of three subtypes, the Saci-pererê (pronounced [sɐˈsi peɾeˈɾe]), the stereotypical one-legged black man with red cap and pipe; Saci-trique (pronounced [sɐˈsi ˈtɾiki]), bi-racial and a more benign prankster, playing tricks like tying up the tails of animals; and Saci-saçurá (pronounced [sɐˈsi sɐsuˈɾa]), with red eyes. (Note: Araújo, Alceu Maynard (1964). Folclore nacional (in Portuguese). Vol. 1. São Paulo: Ed. Melhoramentos. p. 419, 2004 edition, p. 509; partially quoted bilingually with English, from the 2nd edition of 1967, by MacGregor-Villarreal (2015).)

=== Physical appearance ===
While the Saci often takes the form of the namesake bird (cuckoo, the matiaperê) and remains unspotted. He makes whistling noises by day or night, which sounds like "Maty-taperê", (Note: Hubner: "one-legged child whistling across forest at night", citing Giese, Wilhelm (1963) "(Book Review) Folklore del Paraguay by Paulo de Carvalho Neto." Zeitschrift fur Ethlnologie 88(1): 159–160.) while others say he sings his melancholy song (cf. § Trickster on how this deceives people)

He can also appear as a one-legged young boy (Note: Tupinambá: kurumi, glossed as "boy", but came to be used mainly for a son of an indeo or a tapuyo.) with red hair (lore of Pará), which has been changed to his wearing a red cap by the influence of civilization. The one-legged boy is always accompanied either by his mother, or an old woman of tapuya or black descent called tatámanha, dressed in rags (Pará).

Certain details as the smoking the clay pipe, and the ability to create whirlwind and to dance and twirl inside it, were part of the folklore solicited in 1917 from the readership of São Paulo and its periphery by newspaper contributor Monteiro Lobato, subsequently published in book form in 1918.

Saci has a hole in both palms of his hands. A favorite pastime of Saci is passing a lit match through these holes.

=== Trickster ===
Usually an incorrigible prankster, the Saci causes no major harm, but there is no little harm that he won't do. In the barn, he sets farm animals loose, sours the milk, chases horses in the meadow and sucks their blood (Note: Portuguese: "..persegue os cavalo no pasto, chupando o sangue dêles".) (in vampiric fashion), torments the chicks, tramples the hens, and spoils the eggs. Besides drinking blood, the Saci tangles the horses' manes. This braiding of elflocks and souring of milk resembles the lore about German kobolds (cf. schrat), as Monteiro Lobato (1927) had noted.

In the kitchen, he causes soup to burn, or the bean to burn, or drops flies into the soup. If popcorn kernels are not popping properly, Saci has been interfering.

Given half a chance, he dulls or breaks the tip of the seamstress's needles, makes her thimble roll into a hole, and tangles her sewing threads. He will hides nail scissors and children's toys.

Anything turned upside-down (e.g. nail lying on the ground turned point up.), inside the house or outside on the farmstead, is blamed on the Saci.

Saci can disappear or turn invisible, but all his powers including invisibility is vested in the hat. Also in order to do his deeds unseen, the Saci can transform himself into a bird, the striped cuckoo (called Matitaperê, Matita Pereira, or saci in Brazilian Portuguese), whose melancholic song seems to come from nowhere: that is to say, the bird uses high-pitched and low-pitched calls to falsely simulate the closeness/lowness or distance/height of its perch, thus confusing travelers and making them lose the way.

He is fond of juggling embers or other small objects and letting them fall through the holes on his palms. An exceedingly nimble fellow, the lack of his right leg does not prevent him from bareback-riding a horse, and sitting cross-legged while puffing on his pipe (a feat comparable to the Headless Mule's gushing fire from the nostrils).

=== Punisher ===
However, if offended, Saci is wont to murder the human by tickling or beating.

=== Counteraction and protection ===
As aforementioned, the Saci can raise the dust devil (dusty whirlwind) and spin-dance inside it, according to folk belief. It is believed the Saci's whirlwind can be diverted and broken up by casting a rosary of white beads or a straw cross from Palm Sunday.

The Saci prefers dryness, or is a desiccated being, and dares not cross a water stream, fearing it will lead to loss of all his powers. Thus one can escape a pursuing Saci by crossing a stream. Another way is to drop ropes full of knots. The Saci is compelled to stop and undo the knots.

One can also try to appease him by leaving behind some cachaça, or some tobacco for his pipe.

==== Capturing and subjugating ====
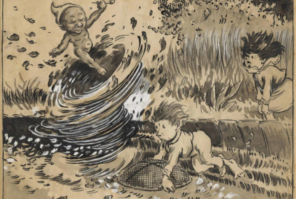
Saci riding the whirlwind, by Voltolino, printed in Monteiro Lobato's children's book O Sacy (1921)

One can even capture him by throwing into the dust devil the beads of a rosary seed (or rosary made of grass or sedge (Note: "rosário de capim")), or by pouncing on it using a sieve with a cross-shape on it. (see Voltolino's painting on right (Note: There are also full color (watercolor) pieces by Voltolino on the same theme of Saci attempted to being captured.。)).

The captured Saci can be imprisoned inside a bottle, and be forced to grant wishes in exchange for freedom, just like Aladdin and the Magic Lamp in Arabian Nights. But this how the character Pedrinho captures the Saci (lure it inside a dark glass bottle, stoppered by a cork with a cross marked on it) in Monteiro Lobato's children's story (originally published 1921), and the understanding here is that "tales of Saci [which] abound in Brazil and .. traced in more recent history to [Monteiro Lobato's 1921 children's book]".

If one can steal the Saci's cap, this is another way one will have dominion over him, and make him do your bidding. In the children's story, Pedrinho is instructed to capture and conceal the Saci's hat (endued with all of the Saci's supernatural powers), with which it can regain its power and escape. This is also part of the general present-day folklore, where the magic power transfers to the captor who takes the Saci's cap, but there will be a "lingering odor" on that person for having touched it.

== Origin theories ==
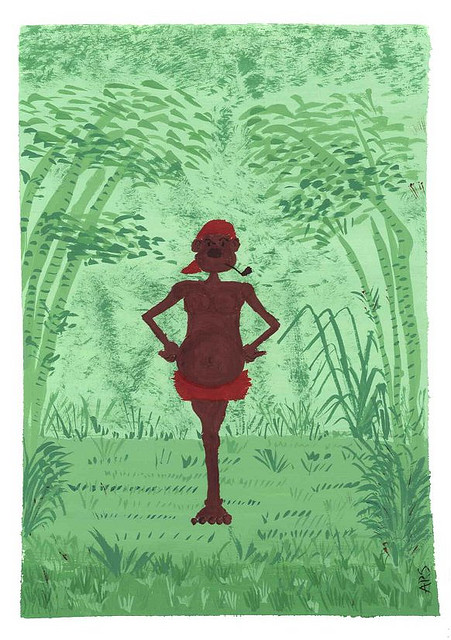
Saci-pererê

The Saci as it developed in the 19th century and onward, is a composite of Tupi spirit and other layers, partly from African slave culture, and partly from European influence. It has optimistically been characterized as a sort of melting pot lore of three races by Alceu Maynard Araújo (1964) (Note: Ziraldo also writes of "sincretismo das três raças.. o indio, o negro e o português" in his discussion of the Saci.) But different socio-ethnic groups had differing views; the Saci was basically considered to be African or dark-skinned, and certain negative stereotypes about the blacks as held by wealthy landowners and those in power have been reflected into the image of the Saci from those quarters of the population (cf. Monteiro Lobato § Racism in his work and thoughts).

Just as saci is also the name of a bird, the "striped cuckoo", Saci was probably originally an avian myth, as Luís da Câmara Cascudo (1976) has argued. A bird will often perch on just one standing leg, and this can easily lead to the legend that the Saci in human form was one-legged. There is also a myth which casts Jaci the Moon and Saci the curassow (Portuguese: mutum) bird as former siblings in incestuous love before their transformations, which would explain such names as Jaci-Taperê ("tapera da Lua", "ruin or abandoned house of the moon").

However, a more anthropomorphic type of Saci (dubbed "Saci-moleque" or "Saci-imp" by Queiroz), nocturnal and shy, was introduced to Southern Brazil in the late 18th century, from further down south from the Tupi-Gurani population in Paraguay, and the Saci underwent further modification in the 19th century. The original Paraguayan Yací-Yateré has been described by Cascudo as a red duende about the size of a 7 year-old child, who stole camp fire, having no knowledge how to strike fire. In the name Yací-Yateré, yací ([jaˈsi]) indeed means "Moon" in Old Tupi.

Couto de Magalhães (1876) also held the view that although he knew Saci Cerêrê to be a red capped, small-sized tapuio like figure, lame in one foot bearing wound marks on each knee, he thought the lore was too contaminated with Christian superstition to know the genuine indigenous lore at the heart of it. Thus the exact role of the Saci Cerêrê in the stewardship of plants was unclear to him, though it must have been assigned one, being a subservient spirit to Jaci who was the supreme mother of all vegetation as well as being a lunar goddess.

There have been various origin theories emphasizing the influenced of various ethnic groups, as collated in the studies by Renato da Silva Queiroz (1995a, 1995b). A different picture from Cascudo's on the origins of Saci contended that it was based on the Brazilian-African (Bantu) myth of Dudu Calunga, a one-legged, one-eyed black boy or man, proposed by Antônio Joaquim de Souza Carneiro (1937). But Europe also spoke of the race of the one-legged Sciapod or Monopod goes which might have been a source, since this legend goes back to Classical times, later to be prominently illustrated in printed books.

His red cap is a trait shared by the trasgo or "goblin", and (while the red cap is common in household spirits all over Europe), the trasgo in Portuguese lore has all its supernatural powers concentrated in the cap.

The Saci-Pererê concept shows some syncretism with Christian elements: he bolts away when faced with crosses, leaving behind a sulphurous smell – classical attributes of the devil in Christian folklore. It has been argued by Queiroz that Saci's sulfur smell, devilishness, thievery, sorcery, etc., are things that the "rural dominant class" among the Paulistas had ascribed black laboring population, while the common rural folk were free of such bigotry. Monteiro Lobato was not the inventor of the sulfur legend, having only collected it from readers. But Monteiro Lobato's children's book (1921) made Saci familiar to the urban populace, as a heroic figure black color, nevertheless retained the negative stigma of the sulfuric smell and capturability, resulting the modern media subsequently censuring and downplaying those aspects (thus "taming" the Saci from the wild) .

== Parallel ==
A similar creature of lore is Romãozinho, a mythic black boy who hit his mother and was condemned to roam the fields and forests.

== Saci day ==
State of São Paulo in 2004 designated that October 31 be celebrated not as Halloween (aka "Dia das Bruxas") but as Saci Day. The nation of Brazil followed suit and made this official in 2010.

== In popular culture ==
- The character remains quite popular in present-day Brazilian urban culture, mainly due to the immensely popular children's book O Saci by Monteiro Lobato (1921). Saci also has appearances in other films and TV series adaptations of Sítio do Picapau Amarelo.
- In the 1960s, the one-legged gnome – by now "domesticated" into a prankish but inoffensive and lovable creature – was chosen by premier Brazilian cartoonist Ziraldo as the leading character of his comics magazine Turma do Pererê. This original publication, the first of its genre to feature entirely "national" characters, was short-lived, but paved the way for other Brazilian cartoonists like Angeli, Laerte, and Mauricio de Sousa.
- The Saci-Perrere appears as Akuman-kun's 11th disciple in Shigeru Mizuki's manga Akuma-kun ("devil boy", aka "Shingo Umoregi" version, serialized 1988- and printed in 3 volume set, 1995) (Note: Neither the original Akuma-kun aka "Ichiro Matsushita" (1963–1964) for rental manga mpr ala "Shingo Yamada" for Shōnen Magazine (1966–) had Saci-Perrere as disciple.)
- Tom Jobim's song "Águas de Março" mentions the Matinta Pereira, and Nei Lopes's samba song entitled "Fumo de Rolo" tells a tale of a fisherman being accosted by the saci while collecting reeds in the forest. The Saci demands some tobacco for his pipe, but the poor fellow has lost his.
- In the 2012 video game Max Payne 3, set mainly in São Paulo, Brazil, a trickster Saci makes a cameo as a villain in the in-game cartoon show The Adventures of Captain Baseball Bat Boy. In it Saci has his trademark pipe, red cap and shorts, and is missing his right leg. However, his skin is green.
- The Saci appears in AdventureQuest Worlds. This version has a human-like appearance, wields a spoon, and has a tornado where his legs should be while also performing wind attacks.
- The Saci appears in Invisible City (2021), played by Wesley Guimarães.
- In 2024, the indie horror game "Saci: The Cursed Hunt" by Marcos Silva reimagines Saci as a terrifying figure rooted in Brazilian folklore. Set in the Amazon rainforest, the game challenges players to survive his relentless pursuit.

== In science ==
A novel species of dinosauromorph, discovered in 2001 at Agudo (southern Brazil), was named Sacisaurus because the fossil skeleton was missing one leg.

The names of the Brazilian satellites SACI-1 and SACI-2 were backronyms on the character's name, as well as four retrotransposons in the DNA of the fluke Schistosoma mansoni were named Saci-1, Saci-2, Saci-3, and Perere, for their ability to jump around in the parasite's genome.

Since the Saci's one-legged physique reminds us of people with a physical disability, a social network named SACI (an acronym of Solidariedade, Apoio, Comunicação e Informação, meaning "Solidarity, Support, Communication, and Information") was created at the University of São Paulo with the purpose of stimulating these four efforts towards the social and medical rehabilitation of physically disabled people.

== As a mascot ==
Sport Club Internacional (and Social Futebol Clube) has the figure of Saci as its mascot, owing to the club's popular roots, the red color of his clothing and the fans' hope that the team could pull tricks on their opponents. When Wason Rentería played for the club, in the 2005 and 2006 seasons, he would often celebrate his goals by doing an impersonation of Saci.

== See also ==
- Afro-Brazilian – Ethno-racial group in Brazil
- Candomblé – Syncretic religion from Brazil
- Indigenous peoples of Brazil
- Monopod (creature) – Mythological humanoids with a single leg
- Prêmio Saci
- Romãozinho - myth of a black boy who hit his mother and was condemned to roam the wilderness
