= Chapeuzinho Amarelo =

1970 book by Chico Buarque

- Author: Chico Buarque
- Illustrator: Ziraldo
- Language: Portuguese
- Genre: Children's
- Publication date: 1970
- Publication place: Brazil
- Pages: 36
- ISBN: 8551301829

Chapeuzinho Amarelo is a children's book written by musician Chico Buarque in 1970, and later becoming known for having been illustrated by cartoonist and writer Ziraldo in 1979. The book was originally dedicated to Buarque's daughters and by 2017 there had been 40 editions released.

It is known for being a retelling of Little Red Riding Hood addressing a story about overcoming fear. It's considered a cult classic of Brazilian children's literature, it was awarded the Highly Recommended for Children seal from the National Children's Book Foundation (FNLIJ) in 1979 and won the Jabuti award in the Illustration category in 1998.

== Plot ==
The book tells a story in poetry form about a girl called Chapeuzinho Amarelo (lit. Little Yellow Riding Hood), a girl wearing a yellow hat who is known for being afraid of everything with her greatest fear being an imaginary wolf that she had never met and as her fears grew, the greater her fear of the wolf grew. After thinking so much about the wolf she decides to meet him, but after meeting him her fear gradually disappears until her fear for him disappears. The wolf, unhappy with seeing the girl lose her fear, decides to scare her by shouting "I'm a wolf!" several times, but Little Yellow laughs and ignores him until the wolf after shouting so much and reversing the syllables from lobo (wolf) to bolo (cake) turns into a cake that is afraid of being eaten by her. Little Yellow ignores the wolf and all her fears, and from then on starts to personify each creature that scares her in a different way, reversing the syllables of their names.

== Adaptations ==
The book was adapted into animation in 2001 in one of the episodes of the first season of Livros Animados, which aired on the Futura.

On January 12, 2019, an animated series titled Chapeuzinho de Todas as Cores (lit. Little All-Colors Riding Hood) premiered on Saturday mornings on TV Cultura with just one season with 13 7-minute episodes produced by the animation studio Animaking.

Adaptations of the book in the form of plays have also occurred over the years.

== Reception ==
The book was listed as one of the best children's books to help children deal with fears in addition to being praised for its humorous narrative adapting the original fairy tale.

The illustrations made by Ziraldo have been the target of critical praise, considering that his arts helped to better interpret Buarque's story, being awarded for best illustration in 1998. Because of this, the book is considered one of Ziraldo's main works, who would later be known for writing more children's books throughout his career.
