= Estádio Louis Ensch =

Brazilian football stadium

Louis Ensch
- "Luizão"
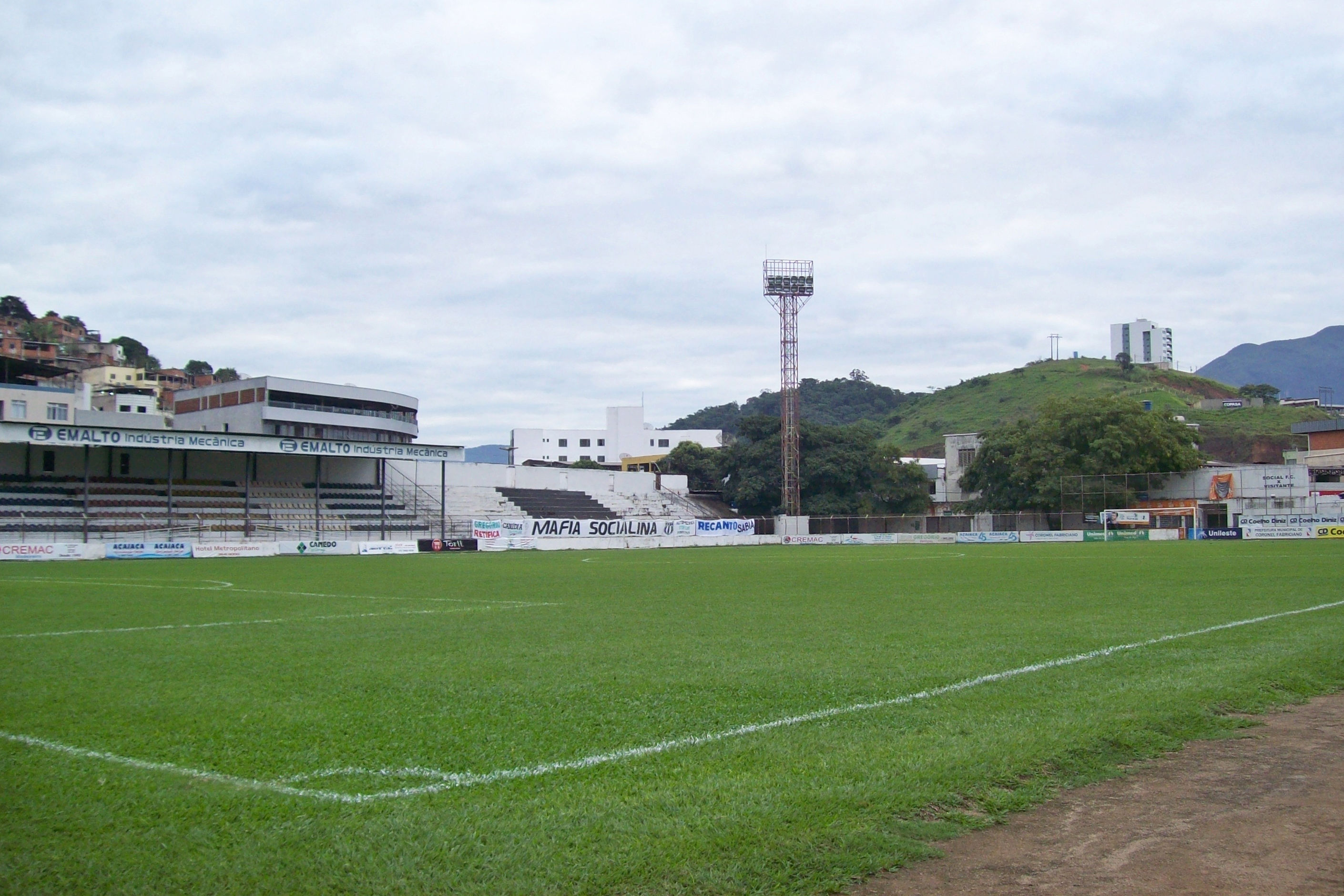
- Interactive map of Louis Ensch
- Full name: Estádio Louis Ensch
- Location: Rua São Sebastião 673, Coronel Fabriciano, Minas Gerais, Brazil
- Coordinates: 19°31′21″S 42°37′35″W
- Owner: Social Futebol Clube
- Operator: Social Futebol Clube
- Capacity: 1900 (Current) - 300 in covered seats
- Surface: Grass
- Record attendance: 7,000
- Field size: 110 m × 75 m (361 ft × 246 ft)

Construction
- Opened: 1950

Tenants
- Social Futebol Clube other Clubs from Coronel Fabriciano

Estádio Louis Ensch is the football stadium of the Brazilian football club Social Futebol Clube. It is in the city of Coronel Fabriciano, Minas Gerais. In 2014, it can attend 2,290 people, but has a capacity for 6,000 people.

== History ==
It has a maximum capacity of 6,000 people and was officially inaugurated in 1950 with a commemorative match against América Mineiro.

The largest public attendance registered was 7000 people, in the semi-finals of 1997 State's Championship, when Social drew 2–2 with Villa Nova

In the state's championship of 2009, attending to a more rigorous regulation, the stadium's capacity was reduced to only 1900 supporters, with 190 of them reserved to the away team supporters.

== Gallery ==
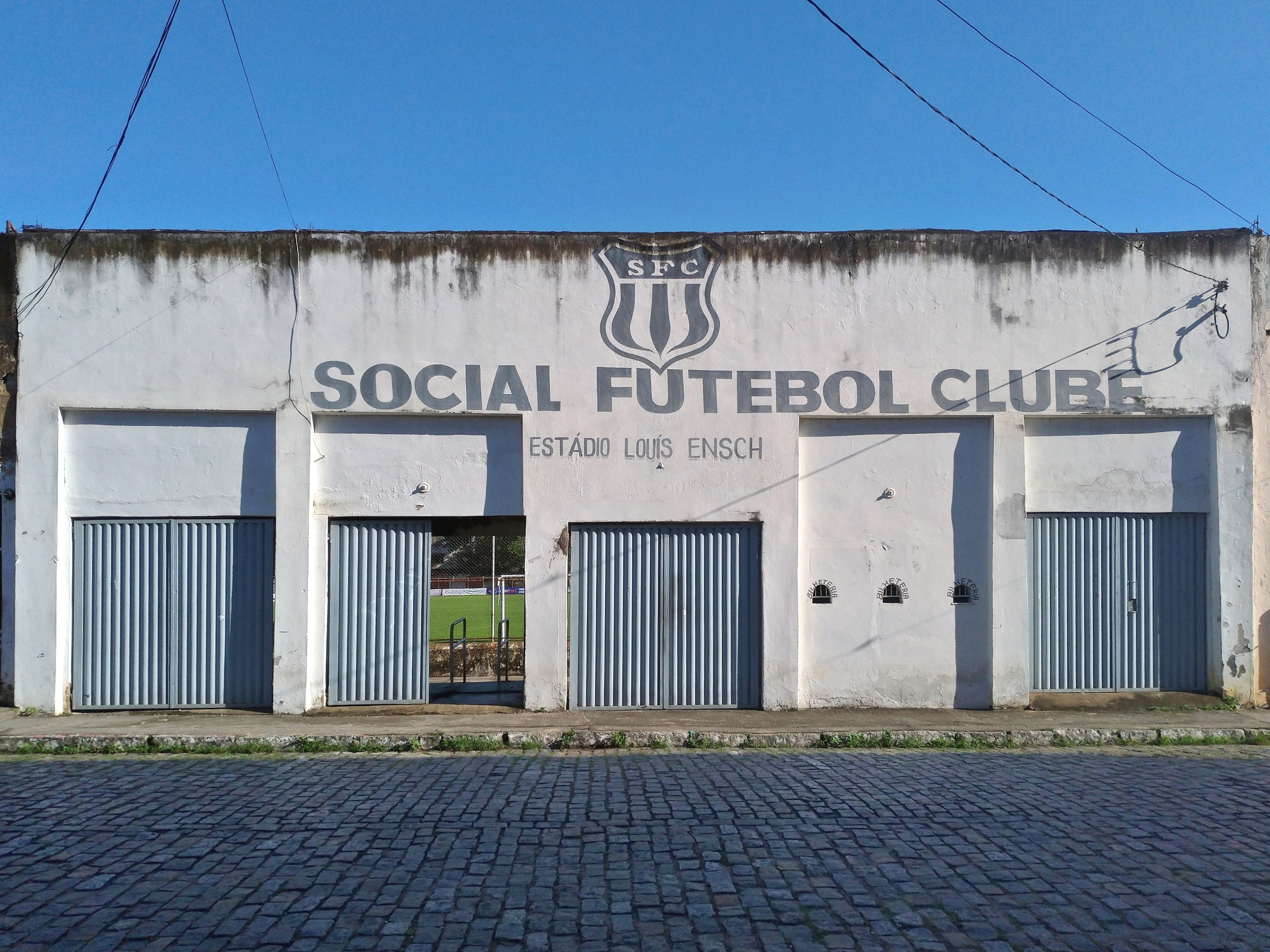
Main entrance.

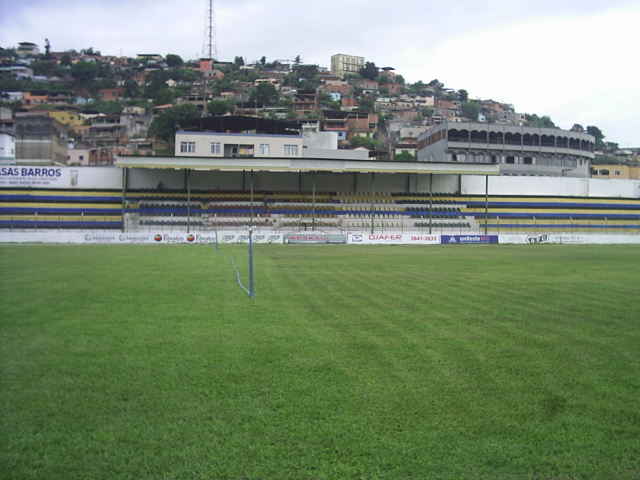
Louis Ensch in 2008.
