= Fernando Alves (footballer, born 1979) =

Brazilian footballer (born 1979)

Personal information
- Full name: Fernando Alves dos Santos
- Date of birth: 23 March 1979 (age 47)
- Place of birth: Rio de Janeiro, Brazil
- Height: 1.82 m (6 ft 0 in)
- Position: Centre-back

Senior career*
Years	Team	Apps	(Gls)
2003	Tombense		
2004–2005	Estrela do Norte		
2006	Americano	2	(0)
2006	Social		
2007–2008	Tupi	3	(0)
2009	Democrata		
2009	Juazeirense		
2009	Villa Nova		
2010	Vitória da Conquista		
2010	Maranhão		
2010–2011	Uberlândia		
2011	Oeste	5	(0)
2012	Uberlândia		
2012	Aracruz	8	(0)
2012	Minas Futebol		
2013	Estrela do Norte		
2013	Novo Esporte		
2014	Independente Tucuruí		
2015	Social		

International career^{‡}
2007	Equatorial Guinea	2	(0)
- * Club domestic league appearances and goals as of 16 August 2012 ‡ National team caps and goals as of 2 June 2007

Fernando Alves dos Santos (born 23 March 1979), sometimes known mononymously as Fernando, is a former footballer who played as a defender. Born in Brazil, he represented Equatorial Guinea at international level.

== Club career ==
Fernando played for Tombense (2003), Estrela do Norte (2004–05), Social (2006) when the team won the access to the Campeonato Mineiro's First Division, and for Tupi in the winning seasons of the club on 2007 and 2008. He then played for Democrata and Juazeirense.

== International career ==
Fernando was one of the Brazilian-born naturalised Equatoguinean players by the Brazilian Antônio Dumas (Equatorial Guinea's former coach).

Through of his naturalisation, he has been international for the Equatoguinean national team on 25 March 2007 in an Africa Cup of Nations 2008 Qualifying match against Rwanda, in Malabo, that his national team won 3–1.
Also he was called for other Africa Cup of Nations 2008 Qualifying match, against Rwanda in Kigali on 2 June 2007.

== Honours ==
=== Club ===
Tupi

- Taça Minas Gerais: 2008
