= The Little Black Boy of the Pasture =

Brazilian folklore legend

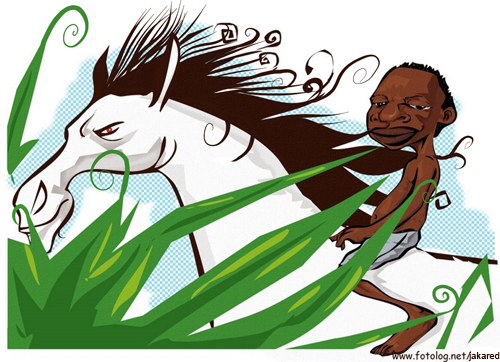
The Little Black Boy of the Pasture on Baio, his dun-colored horse.

The Little Black Boy of the Pasture (Portuguese: Negrinho do Pastoreio) is a Brazilian folklore legend with origins in the Afro-Catholic traditions of southern Brazil, especially in the state of Rio Grande do Sul. It is one of the most iconic examples of syncretic folklore, combining Christian devotion, slavery-era injustices, and regional pastoral culture.

== The Legend ==
According to the legend, the Little Black Boy was an enslaved child tasked with herding horses for a cruel ranch owner. Despite his obedience and hard work, one day he lost a few horses during his watch. Enraged, the master beat him mercilessly, left him bleeding and starving in an anthill, and ordered him not to return until all the horses were found.

That night, the boy prayed to Our Lady (Nossa Senhora) with great faith. A miracle occurred: the horses reappeared, and the boy, now radiant and surrounded by light, was seen riding a beautiful horse beside Our Lady, free from pain and slavery.

He was never seen again in human form, but gauchos (cowboys) say that he continues to ride through the fields at night, helping those who are lost or who have lost objects or animals, as long as they light a candle and pray with faith.

== Religious significance ==
The story reflects the intense Catholic devotion found in Brazil, which is the country with the largest number of Catholics in the world, especially the cult of Our Lady. The legend portrays the child as a symbol of innocence, faith, and redemption. It is often seen as a spiritual response to the injustices of slavery, reimagining the enslaved child as a saintly, eternal helper.
