= Social Futebol Clube =

Social
- Full name: Social Futebol Clube
- Nickname(s): Saci de Aço (Steel Saci)
- Founded: October 1, 1944
- Ground: Luizão
- Capacity: 6,000
- President: Francisco Simões
- 2018: Mineiro Módulo II, 12th (relegated)
| Home colors | Away colors |

Social Futebol Clube, usually known simply as Social, is a currently inactive Brazilian football club from Coronel Fabriciano, founded in 1944.

Their home stadium is Louis Ensch Stadium, which has a maximum capacity of 6,000 people. The club competed in the Brazilian Championship Third Level in 1997.

== History ==
The club was founded on October 1, 1944, more than four years before Coronel Fabriciano's emancipation from Antônio Dias. The name Comercial was considered for the new club, because of the influence of businessman from Antônio Dias city. But the name Social was chosen to make the team represent all social classes of the town. In Portuguese, the word social has the same meaning as in English, but has a different pronunciation.

In the first years of the club's history the players were usually workers of Belgo Mineira Siderurgic and the supporters were mostly Fabriciano's downtown population, from varied social classes. The club's first professional game was played in 1981.

In 1997, Social competed in the Brazilian Championship Third Level, reaching the second stage of the competition, after being defeated by Juventus of São Paulo.

== Achievements ==
=== Professional titles ===
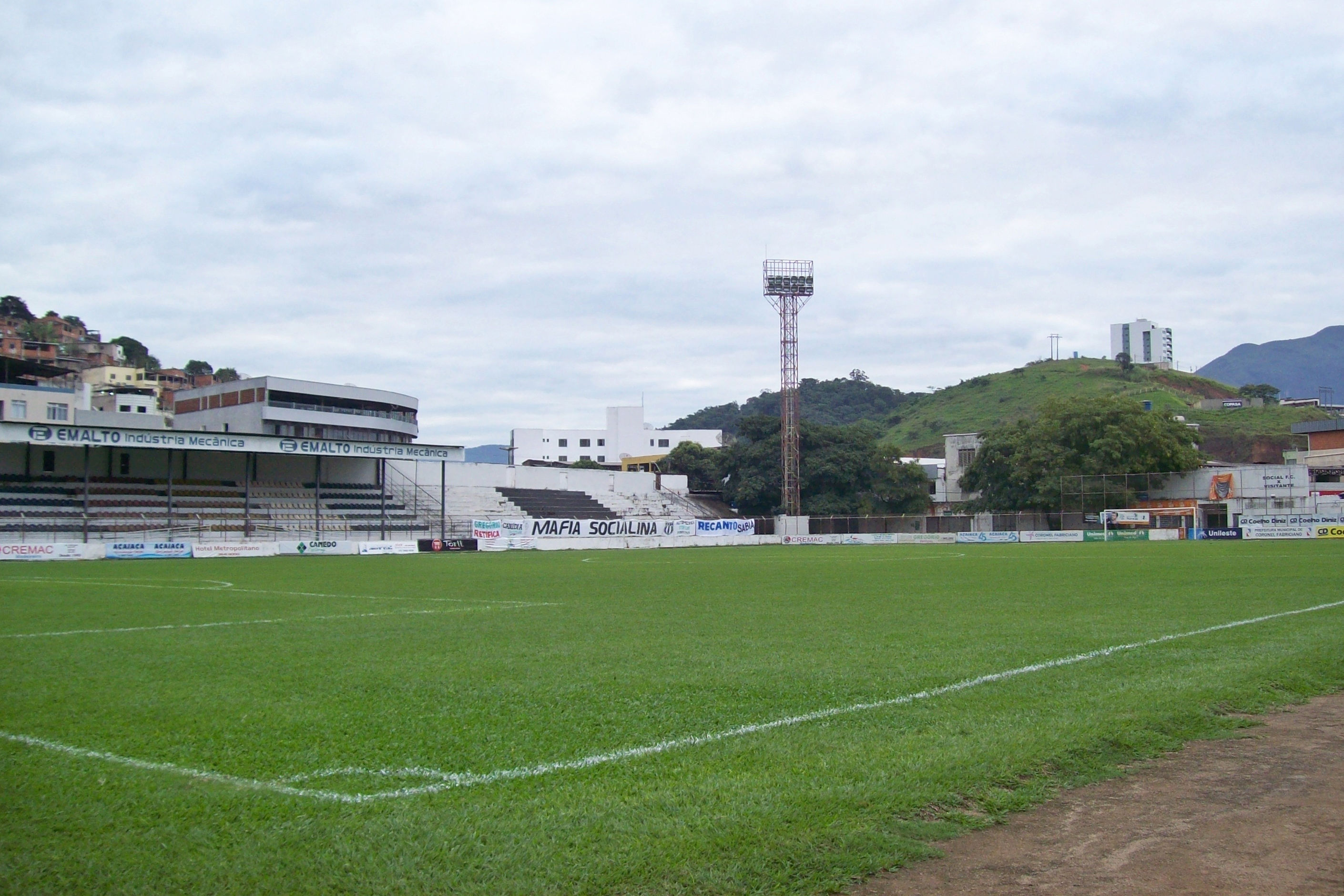
Estádio Louis Ensch

- Campeonato Mineiro Módulo II: (2) 1996, 2007

runner-up: 2002

- Campeonato Mineiro Segunda Divisão: (1) 1995

runner-up: 2011

=== Amateur achievements ===
==== Champion ====
- Amavaço Cup: 2005, 2008
- 6 times Cel Fabriciano's Champion (record).
- Torneio do Asfalto (Tournament in João Monlevade): 1957
- Troféu Rubem Maia: 1956

==== Runner-up ====
- Troféu Usisaúde: 2001

== Stadium ==
The club's home matches are usually played at Louis Ensch stadium, which has a maximum capacity of 6,000 people. When needing a larger capacity, the club usually play at Ipatingão.
