= Giant Water Lily legend =

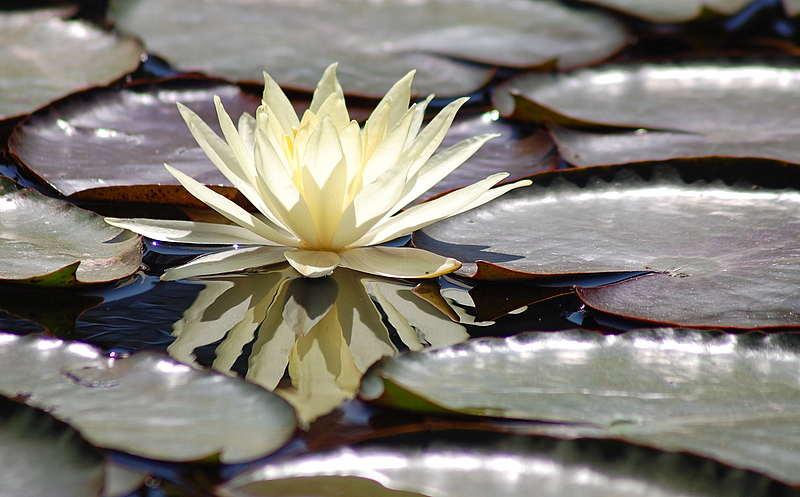
Water Lilly in São Paulo

The Giant Water Lily or Vitória Régia legend (Portuguese: Lenda da vitória-régia) is an origin story among the Tupi-Guarani indigenous people of Brazil.

== Plot ==
Per the legend, an indigenous tribe believed that the moon was the goddess Jaci, (Note: Not to be confused with Jasy Jatere, a separate figure from Guaraní mythology; he is also associated with sleep, but of the daytime siestas of children.) who came at night and kissed and lit up the faces of the most beautiful virgins in the village, the cunhantãs-moças. When the moon hid behind the mountain, she would take girls with her and turn them into stars.

A beautiful virgin named Naiá dreamed of becoming a star, despite warnings that girls taken by Jaci lost their blood and flesh in becoming stars. Naiá roamed the mountains seeking out the moon each night, so obsessed she did not sleep or eat. While resting on the edge of the lake, she saw the moon's reflection on the water, and desperately seeking the goddess, dove into the water and drowned. To reward her for this sacrifice, Jaci turned her into a star different from all the others, the "star of the waters", which is the giant water lily (Victoria amazonica) plant.

A number of versions of the legend exist, based on a girl attempting to unite with the moon.
