= Apinajé people =

Indigenous people from Brazil

Apinajé
Apinayé
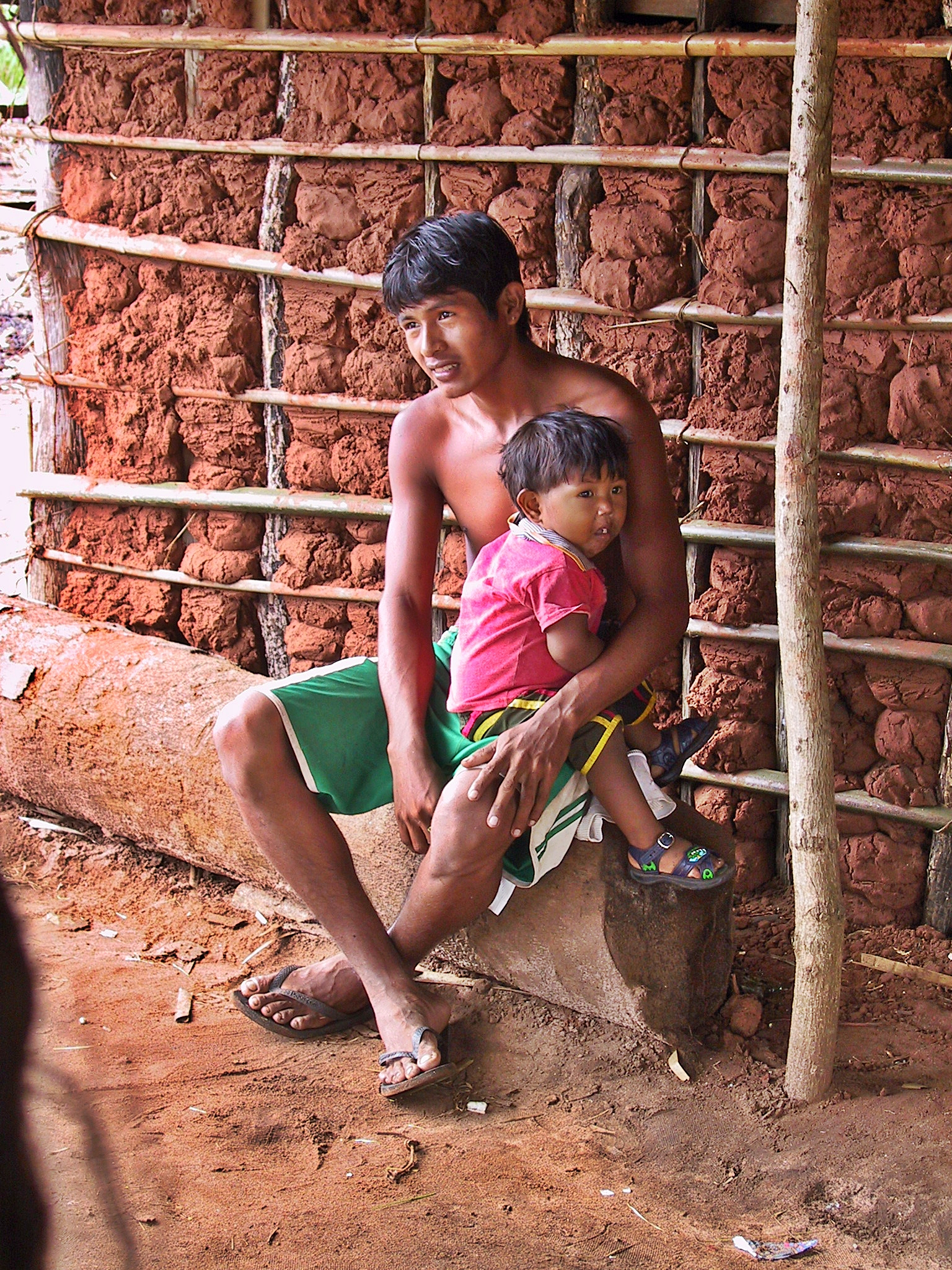
- Apinajé father holding his son

Total population
- 2,277 (2014)

Regions with significant populations
- Brazil
- Tocantins: 2,277

Languages
- Apinayé, Portuguese

Religion
- Animism

The Apinajé (otherwise known as Apinayé, Afotigé, Aogé, Apinagé, Otogé, Oupinagee, Pinagé, Pinaré, Uhitische, Utinsche, and Western Timbira) are an Indigenous people of Brazil called Gê, living in the state of Tocantins, Eastern Central Brazil.

== History ==
Before the 20th century, there used to be three main Apinajé groups known as the Rõrkojoire, the Cocojoire, and the Krĩjobreire, each with their own land and political division, which totaled more than half of the current territory. Currently, the three distinct Apinajé groups have been living together, though São José is controlled by the Krĩjobreire, and Mariazinha has Cocojoire leadership. During the first quarter of the nineteenth century the Apinajé had a successful economic growth fueled by extensive cattle farming and the extraction of babaù palm oil which brought an increase in migration. In the late 20th century, immigrants encroached on Apinajé lands. Their lands divided when highways such as the Belém-Brasilia Highway and the Trans-Amazonian Highway. Part of their lands separated by the Trans-Amazonian Highway was taken from them and the tribe is working to regain it. The land rights of the Apinajé have been recognized by the federal government of Brazil in the 1988 Constitution.

=== Contact ===
The Apinajé indigenous population has had contacts with the Jesuits, military bands and explorers, similar to the experiences of other indigenous groups. Between 1633 and 1658, the Jesuits journeyed up the Tocantins River in order to “[persuade] the Indians to ‘descend’ the river to the villages of Pará”. This ushered in the potential of further encounters. On one of his expeditions, Captain-General D. Luiz Mascarenhas was confronted by “war-like” people, the Apinajé, in 1740. Another confrontation between the Portuguese settlers and the Apinajé occurred in 1774 when Antônio Luiz Tavares Lisboa and his band of explorers were traveling by way of the Tocantins River. These early contacts did not greatly disrupt the lifestyle of the Apinajé people. It was not until the 19th century that the indigenous group would suffer from colonization. This was due to the shrinking of their territory and population reduction in the face of settlement establishment by the Portuguese. Da Matta (1982) believes that the Apinajé were saved from extinction mainly due to the fact that the area they were situated in did not have true economic value.

=== Conflict ===
During the initial colonization period, the Apinajé had been recorded as being hostile to European expeditions. This prompted the construction of the military post of Alcobaça in 1780. However, it was soon abandoned due to the successful raids of the Apinajé. This only prompted further fortifications. In 1791 “another military post was founded on the Arapary river” and the same occurred in 1797 with the construction of the post of São João das Duas Barras. Regardless of previous conflicts, the Apinajé participated in the War for Independence of 1823 after sending “250 warriors to join the troops of José Dias de Mattos”. The most recent area of conflict was during the construction of the Trans-Amazon highway in 1985, which was supposed to be built over indigenous land. With the support of Krahô, Xerente, Xavante, and Kayapó warriors, the Apinajé had their lands recognized by the Brazilian state and the route of the highway was altered to avoid passing through this indigenous territory.

=== Schools ===
Schools existed in the area of the Apinajé as early as the early 19th century, however it is unclear if their purpose was for the indigenous group or the general settler population. The first instructional materials for the Apinajé language were organized by the missionaries of the Summer Institute of Linguistics, in this particular case, missionary Patricia Ham. Governmental support for indigenous schools was established as part of the 1988 Constitution. In the current school system of the Apinajé, children start to learn in their native language up to the 4th grade, when Portuguese is introduced. The schools are run by the Apinajé community, with some non-Indigenous instructors and assistants. These schools further support the hypothesis that transmission rates are high; children are monolingual until they reach an age when they can start learning another language, leading to the majority of the population as being bilingual. The Apinayé language is still an important part of the culture of the group, and therefore has the ability to continue thriving.

== Literature ==
=== Ethnography ===
The most recent ethnographic study done on the Apinayé people is from 2017, where the education system is analyzed (Sousa et al.). The most prominent ethnography of the Apinayé language and people is Oliveira's thesis dissertation (2005). This was preceded by Da Matta's work (1982) which explores Apinayé customs and traditions. Curt Nimuendajú was a German anthropologist and ethnologist who wrote The Apinayé (1939). The book is based on the social structure of the indigenous group, though it also includes minimal information regarding the linguistic formation of the Apinayé language.

== Economy ==
Apinajé woman farm subsistence gardens, while men fell trees and plant rice. Common crops include bananas, beans, broad beans, papayas, peanuts, pumpkins, sweet potatoes, watermelons, and yams. Apinajé families raise cattle, pigs, and chickens. Hunting and fishing supplement domestic foods. In the past, babaçu nuts were sold for cash.

== Language ==
Apinajé people speak the Apinayé language, a Macro-Jê language. It is spoken in thirteen villages by the majority of the tribe. Some Apinajé people also speak Portuguese.

=== Related languages ===
The Jê family is the largest language family in the Macro-Jê stock. It contains eight languages, some of which have many dialects within them. The languages of this family are concentrated mostly in “the savanna regions of Brazil from the southern parts of the states of Pará and Maranhão south to Santa Catarina and Rio Grande do Sul”. Unfortunately, many other languages in the Macro-Jê stock have become extinct, because their eastern coast location resulted in earlier contact with Europeans, which was violent and detrimental to many indigenous communities.

== See also ==
- Uaica, hunter in Apinajé legend
