= Romãozinho =

Romaozinho (Portuguese: Romãozinho [xomãw'ziɲu]) is a character from Brazilian folklore who bears the burden of immortality. As he is cursed with unending life, he is somewhat similar to the character Ahasvero. The legend of Romãozinho started in the Boa Sorte district, Pedro Afonso, Goiás.

== Text ==
In the parable which bears his name, he is the son of a serf, and is disobedient from birth. He takes great pleasure in treating animals cruelly and destroying plants.

Sometimes, his mother orders him to carry a meal to his father, who works in a garden, and Romãozinho goes, albeit unwillingly. One afternoon en route to delivery, he eats the chicken his mother has sent, puts its bones back in the box, and carries it to his father. Upon opening the box, the perplexed father asks what the bones mean. Romãozinho replies:

"That's what they gave me. I thought that my mother had eaten a chicken with a man who always goes to our home when you're not there, and sent you just the bones."

Mad with rage, the father immediately returns home, whereupon he pulls out a dagger and kills his wife. Before dying, the mother curses the laughing son, saying:

"You will never die! You won't know heaven or hell, or even rest until there's just one person left living on Earth!"

Romãozinho laughs at the curse and leaves. From that moment onward, the boy never grows. He breaks roof tiles with stones, frightens people and tortures chickens, and is presumably walking through the streets and causing mischief to this day.

However, despite his sadistic and sociopathic personality, Romãozinho isn't pure evil and has been known to occasionally use his mischief for noble and selfless reasons. For example, there is a pregnant woman in labor, but there was no midwife to help, so she begged for help. Romãozinho promptly assists by scaring a local midwife's chicken to the woman, helping the woman to give birth.
