= Fernando Alves (footballer, born 1984) =

Uruguayan footballer

Personal information
- Full name: Fernando Daniel Alves Olivera
- Date of birth: 26 November 1984 (age 41)
- Place of birth: Montevideo, Uruguay
- Height: 1.65 m (5 ft 5 in)
- Position: Attacking midfielder

Team information
- Current team: Real Estelí
- Number: 24

Senior career*
Years	Team	Apps	(Gls)
2004–2010	Cerro	96	(9)
2011	Rentistas	9	(0)
2012–	Real Estelí		
- * Club domestic league appearances and goals

Fernando Daniel Alves Olivera (born 26 November 1984) is a Uruguayan footballer who plays for Real Estelí in the Nicaraguan Primera División.

== Honours ==
Rentistas

- Uruguayan Segunda División: 2010-11
