= O Menino Maluquinho =

Comic series by Ziraldo

- Cover of the original 1980 book
- Created by: Ziraldo
- Original work: O Menino maluquinho (1980)

Print publications
- Book(s): List of books
- Comics: O Menino Maluquinho (1989 – 1994) • O Menino Maluquinho (2000 – 2001) • O Menino Maluquinho (2004 – 2007)
- Magazine(s): Revista do Menino Maluquinho (1994 – 1996)

Films and television
- Film(s): O Menino Maluquinho (1995) • O Menino Maluquinho 2 (1998)
- Television series: Um Menino muito Maluquinho (2006)
- Animated series: O Menino maluquinho (2023)

Miscellaneous
- Voiced by: Marcus Pejon (2022)

O Menino Maluquinho (lit. 'The Nutty Boy') is a children's media franchise created by the Brazilian writer and cartoonist Ziraldo in 1980. It started as a children's book published in 1980 which for many years was regarded as a classic of children's literature in Brazil, getting spun off into comics, movies, plays and TV series, as well being known for being Ziraldo's longest running comic book series and the second most popular, after "Turma do Pererê".

The main character, Maluquinho is a cheerful and optimistic 10-year-old boy who wears a pan on his head like a hat. Most of the stories revolve around the misadventures of Maluquinho and his friends with a light humour.

== Plot ==
The book describes an unnamed fictional child known only as "The Nutty Boy". The boy is absurdly described as having "the eyes bigger than the belly, fire in the tail, feet of wind, huge legs that could hug the world and little monkeys in the attic" at the beginning of the book (as a way of describing how eccentric he is).

Throughout the book, the boy's behavior in his daily life is described, being an intelligent student at school, who loves to play kite and visit his grandmother, having several girlfriends, frequently having accidents while playing, having his secrets and always accompanying and encouraging his friends at soccer matches.

In the end, the boy grows up and becomes a nice person and realizes that he had not been a Nutty Boy, but a Happy Boy.

== Characters ==
- Maluquinho (lit. 'Nutty') - The main character, an eccentric and smart boy, mischievous and troublemaking but good-hearted. He is always close to his friends Bocão and Junim, and is popular with girls (it is said in the book that he has 10 girlfriends, all at once), mainly Julieta. He often wears a cooking pot on his head as an improvised Napoleon's hat, an adult-sized blue jacket and brown dress shoes, both pieces looking quite oversized on him. Aside from that, his main attire is a yellow T-shirt, black shorts and white and sky blue sneakers. In the English dub his name was changed to Nutty.
- Julieta - Maluquinho's girlfriend. She's also a 10-year-old girl, sometimes considered a female version as "Menina Maluquinha" ("The Nutty Girl"). Julieta is cheerful, energetic, and talkative. She has a blue pet cat named Romeu (a reference to the Shakespearean tragedy Romeo and Juliet). She had her own comic that was released in 2004. She has long, black, frizzy hair, wears a red T-shirt with a lightning bolt design (very similar to Captain Marvel's symbol), pleated white skirt and red and white sneakers. In the Netflix series, she is African-Brazilian. In the English dub her name was changed to Juliet.
- Bocão (lit. 'Gobber' or 'Big Mouth') - One of Maluquinho's best friends, a chubby and gluttonous boy which often is always beside of Maluquinho in most of his plans and jokes. Usually he is ingenuous and is induced to the conversations of his friends. He has a little sister named Nina, that usually annoys him. He is a bit taller than the others and dresses all in blue. In the English dub his name was changed to Bazoo.
- Junim (a corruption of Juninho, in turn an affectionate form of Junior) - Another one of Maluquinho's best friends, short in stature and with thick-rimmed glasses. Often gets stressed when his friends make fun of his little size. Like Maluquinho and Julieta, he also had his own comic that was released in 2007. Has blond hair which stands upright to resemble a flattop, wears a black-and-red striped shirt, blue pants and tennis shoes. In the English dub his name was changed to Junior.
- Carolina "Carol" - Julieta's best friend. She is a vegetarian who cares about nature. She has black hair done in braided pigtails and wears a green dress.
- Herman - A bully and Maluquinho's rival. He is a tall strong boy who is jealous of Maluquinho for always being the center of attention and often threatens to beat him. Has strawberry blond hair and wears mainly a blue sweater with jogging pants in the same color.
- Lúcio - A friend of Maluquinho. He is the most intellectual kid in the class, always with a book in his hands. He is an African-Brazilian boy, usually wears a plaid shirt in the black and yellow colors.
- Sugiro Fernando - Another friend of Maluquinho. He is a Japanese-Brazilian boy who loves technology, computers and video games. He is usually seen with closed eyes, wears a red shirt and white pants, and has buckteeth.
- Shirley Valéria - Julieta's frenemy. A rich girl who is always obsessed with fashion and fitness and always buy new clothes to attract the boys. She is blonde and is the only character to have blue eyes, usually wears a pink sleeveless shirt, blue gym pants, pink legwarmers and white-pink sneakers.

== Adaptations ==
=== Comics ===
The first time a comic featuring the character was published was in 1988 in the comic book magazine "Revistinha do Ziraldo" (Ziraldo's Little Magazine) which was published by Editora Abril being a comic book that brought together stories of different characters from Ziraldo's books. The title lasted a short time with only 6 issues, because in the following year Ziraldo started to focus only on developing newspaper strips and comic books of O Menino Maluquinho, with the first title being sold initially under the title of "O Menino Maluquinho em Quadrinhos" (The Nutty Boy in Comics). In the last years of publication during Editora Globo they have been sold titles starring Julieta and Junim. There were a total of 162 comic books have been published over the years.

Editora Abril

- O Menino Maluquinho (1989–1994) - 70 issues
- Revista do Menino Maluquinho (1994–1996) - 18 issues

Editora Terra

- O Menino Maluquinho (2000–2001) - 10 issues

Editora Globo

- O Menino Maluquinho (2004–2007) - 29 issues
- Julieta (2004–2007) - 29 issues
- Junim (2007) - 6 issues

=== Films ===
In 1995 Nutty Boy - The Movie was released, directed by Helvécio Ratton, with a cast of Samuel Costa, Roberto Bomtempo, Patrícia Pillar, Othon Bastos and Luís Carlos Arutin (in his final film role). The movie follows Maluquinho's life with his friends and their pranks, dealing with his parents divorce and his relationship with his grandfather, that is a retired aviator who lives on a farm and dies at the end of the film.

The film had a sequel in 1998 titled Nutty Boy 2 - The Adventure, directed by Fernando Meirelles, with the same cast as the first film. In this movie Maluquinho tells his friends a story of another trip to his grandfather's house, where they discover a creature of fire called Tatá and become her friends.

In 2019 it was announced the production of an animated film based on the character by the studio Chatrone in partnership with Netflix.

=== TV series ===
==== Live action ====
In 2006, the channel TVE Brasil (currently TV Brasil) produced a live-action sitcom called Um Menino Muito Maluquinho. This was the channel's second adaptation of Ziraldo's comics, following A Turma do Pererê. The series, usually narrated by an adult, follows the life of Maluquinho and his friends, alternating between their early childhood (up to age 5) and his current age of 10. The show became popular, winning several awards and being broadcast on other channels— TV Cultura and Disney Channel— but did not have a second season.

==== Animated series ====
In 2014, the production of an animated series based on the character was announced. In November 2021, it was revealed that Netflix will be distributing the show in selected territories. The series was released on October 12, 2022. An additional batch of episodes were eventually released on April 6, 2023.

== Other books ==
With the success of the comics, other books based on the character were written by Ziraldo over the years. These books started to use the characters created in the comics, such as Julieta, Bocão and Junim. Some of the published books were:

- O Livro do Riso do Menino Maluquinho (November 20, 2000)
- O Livro das Mágicas do Menino Maluquinho (2000)
- A Panela do Menino Maluquinho (November 2007)
- O Livro do Sim and O Livro do Não (April 30, 2009)
- O Livro de Receitas do Menino Maluquinho (July 23, 2014)
- Os Hai-Kais do Menino Maluquinho (2012)
- O Livro dos Jogos, Brincadeiras e Bagunças do Menino Maluquinho (2014)
- Eu, Eu, Eu e o Mar (August 2018) - Adaptation of one of the episodes of the TV series.
- O Pior Amigo (August 2018) - Also an adaptation of one of the episodes of the TV series.

In 1996 Ziraldo also created a series of spin-off book series with the characters as babies entitled Bebê Maluquinho (Nutty Baby). Julieta's success in the comics published by Globo resulted in a book focused on the character entitled Uma Menina Chamada Julieta (A Girl Called Julieta) published in 2009.

=== Crossover with Monica's Gang ===
In 2018, a book entitled MMMMM: Mônica e Menino Maluquinho na Montanha Mágica (Monica and Nutty Boy in the Magic Mountain), written by Manuel Filho with illustrations made by both Mauricio de Sousa and Ziraldo. The book marks the first official crossover between O Menino Maluquinho and Monica's Gang, two of the most popular comic book franchises in Brazil. The book's success spawned a sequel the following year entitled 5... 4... 3... 2... 1: Mônica e Menino Maluquinho Perdidos no Espaço (Monica and Nutty Boy Lost in Space), also written by Manuel Filho.

== Reception and legacy ==
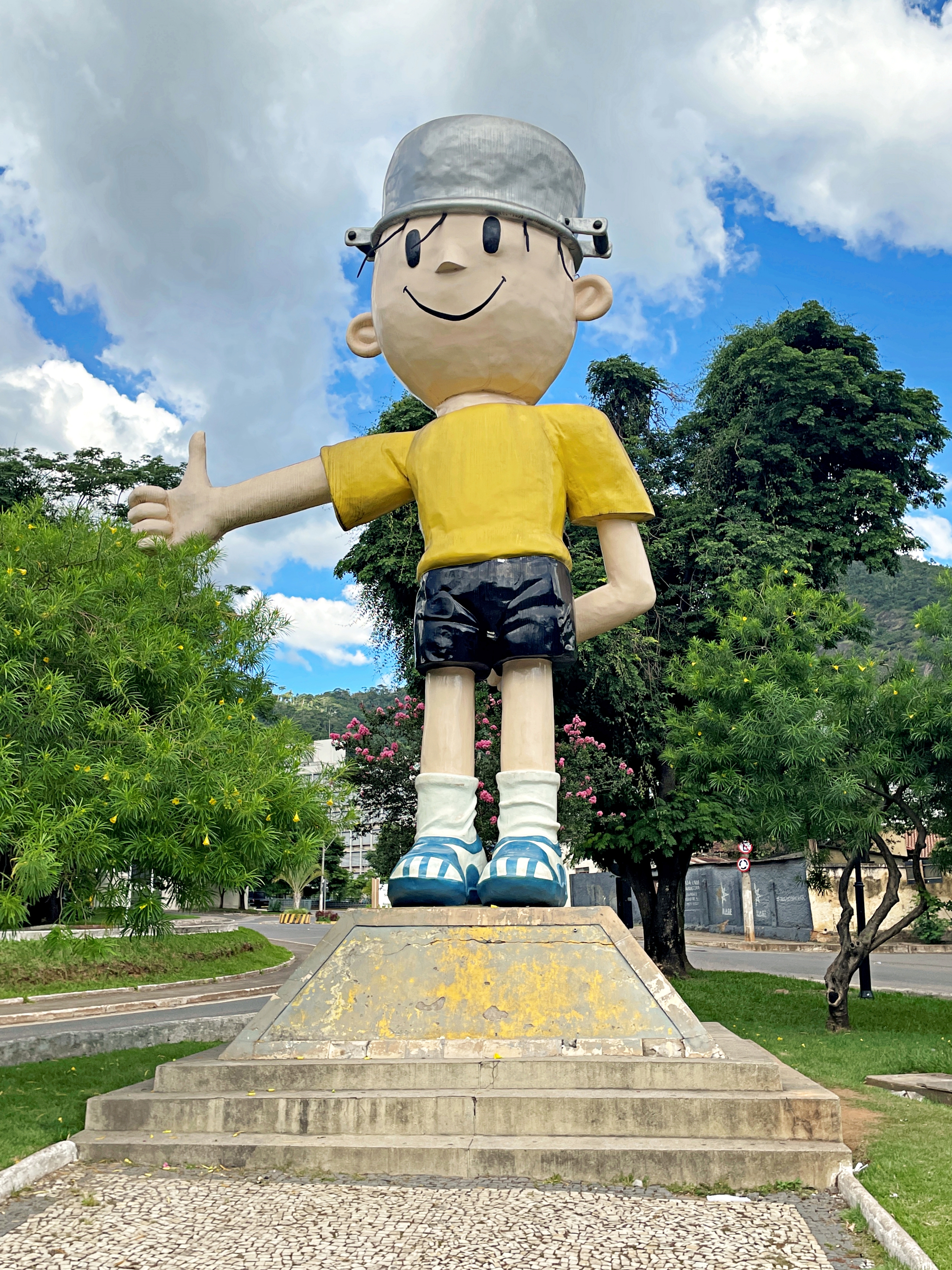
Statue of Menino Maluquinho in Caratinga, Minas Gerais

The first book is known for having had an impact on Brazilian literary culture, having not only helped to form new generations of readers, but the book has added 18 editions, 165 reprints and 4.1 million copies sold since its first publication, in addition to being Ziraldo's best-known work. The success of the book has inspired Ziraldo to write more children's books in the following years, most notably "Uma Professora Muito Maluquinha" (lit. A Very Nutty Teacher) from 1995. A statue of the character was built on June 21, 2003, in Caratinga, Minas Gerais as a way of honoring Ziraldo, who is a native of this place, the statue has been undergoing renovations, even receiving a mask during the time of the COVID-19 pandemic.

When released the first title of the comic book by Abril in 1989 the magazine was awarded as "Best Release" in 1990 by Prêmio Angelo Agostini. In 2018 Maluquinho was chosen as the model for the trophy for the 30th edition of Troféu HQ Mix along with the character Monica.
