= Uaica =

Karajá and Apinayé mythological character

Uaica is a hunter in the story "The Sleep Tree" of the Karajá and Apinaye people of the rain forests in the central and northern Amazonian plateau.
