= Ziraldo =

Brazilian cartoonist, writer, illustrator (1932–2024)

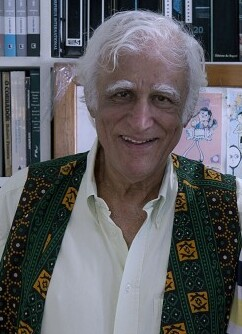
- Ziraldo in 2015
- Born: October 24, 1932 Caratinga, Minas Gerais, Brazil
- Died: April 6, 2024 (aged 91) Rio de Janeiro, Brazil
- Areas: Cartoonist; writer; journalist; painter
- Notable works: O Menino Maluquinho

Ziraldo Alves Pinto (October 24, 1932 – April 6, 2024), known mononymously as Ziraldo, was a Brazilian author, cartoonist, painter, comics creator, and journalist. Ziraldo began his career as a cartoonist in the 1950s, working for several Brazilian magazines and newspapers. His unique style and humorous take on everyday life quickly garnered a significant following.

His books have sold about ten million copies, have been translated to many foreign languages and adapted to the theater and cinema. His children's books, such as the popular O Menino Maluquinho (The Nutty Boy), have also been the basis of successful films and television series in Brazil, following its original publishing in 1980.

In addition to his work in children's literature, Ziraldo also made contributions to adult literature and satire. He was a co-founder of the influential Brazilian humor magazine "O Pasquim," which played a role in the country's political and cultural landscape during the military dictatorship.

== Work ==
Ziraldo first published his work when he was six years old, a year before he started going to school. This was a drawing printed in the newspaper A Folha de Minas in 1938. He began working at the newspaper Folha de S.Paulo in 1954, with a column dedicated to humor. Ziraldo gained national notoriety when he worked at the magazine O Cruzeiro in 1957 and subsequently at Jornal do Brasil in 1963. His characters (including Jeremias o Bom, the Supermãe and Mirinho) won readers.

In 1960, he launched the first Brazilian comic book made by a single author, Turma do Pererê, featuring the Saci of Brazilian folklore, which was also the first comic book produced entirely in color in Brazil. This comic book promoted and also satirized Brazilian traditional values. Although it reached one of the largest runs of the season, Turma do Pererê was canceled in 1964, shortly after the start of the military regime in Brazil. In the 1970s, Editora Abril relaunched the magazine, this time, however, without the same success. Together with other progressive artists, Ziraldo also created the non-conformist comic newspaper O Pasquim in Rio de Janeiro during a period of military dictatorship in Brazil. This tabloid became popular for its humorous critique of the military government.

One of Ziraldo's latest works, "A Última Flor" (The Last Flower), published in 2021, is a reflective and introspective narrative that explores themes of love, loss, and the passage of time. The book explores the human experience, offering readers a contemplative and deeply personal journey. "A Última Flor" has been well-received, showcasing Ziraldo's ability to connect with audiences of all ages.

== Personal life and death ==
Born in the town of Caratinga, he was brother to Zélio Alves Pinto who was also a cartoonist and writer. Ziraldo moved briefly to Rio de Janeiro, having spent two years in the then-capital city, but later returned to his hometown, where he concluded his education. He then joined the undergraduate Law School program at the Minas Gerais Federal University, graduating in 1957.

Ziraldo was the father of the film director Daniela Thomas and the Golden Globe Award-nominated film score composer Antônio Pinto.

He died of natural causes in his apartment in Rio de Janeiro, on 6 April 2024, at the age of 91.

== Works ==
=== Comics ===
- O Pererê (1959 – 1976)
- Jeremias, O Bom (1965–1969)
- The Supermãe (1968–1984)
- O Menino Maluquinho (1988–2007)

=== Books ===
- Flicts (1969)
- O Planeta Lilás (1979)
- O Menino Maluquinho series
  - O Menino Maluquinho (1980)
  - Uma Menina Chamada Julieta (2009)
  - Mônica e o Menino Maluquinho na Montanha Mágica (2018; collaboration with Mauricio de Sousa)
  - O Bebê que Sabia Brincar (2020)
- O Bichinho da Maçã / Bichim series
  - O Bichinho da Maçã (1982)
  - Como ir ao Mundo da Lua (1995)
  - Cada um Mora Onde Pode (2008)
  - As Anedotinhas do Bichinho da Maçã (2011)
  - As Flores da Primavera (2020)
  - Um Amor de Família (2020)
  - O Bichinho que Queria Crescer (2020)
  - As Cores e os Dias da Semana (2020)
- A Fábula das Três Cores (1985)
- O Pequeno Planeta Perdido (1985)
- O Menino Marrom (1986)
- Corpim series
  - Pelegrino & Petrônio
  - Os Dez Amigos
  - Um Sorriso Chamado Luiz
  - Rolim
  - Dodó
  - O Joelho Juvenal
  - O Calcanhar de Aquiles
- O Menino Quadradinho (1989)
- Professora Maluquinha series
  - Uma Professora Muito Maluquinha (1995)
  - As Aventuras da Professora Maluquinha em Quadrinhos (2010)
- Vito Grandam: Uma História de Vôos (1995)
- O Menino do Rio Doce (1996)
- Tia Nota Dez (1996)
- Menina Nina: Duas Razões Para Não Chorar (2002)
- O Menino e seu Amigo (2003)
- Os Meninos Morenos (2004)
- O Aspite (2005)
- Os Meninos dos Planetas series
  - O Menino da Lua
  - O Namorado da Fada ou Menino de Urano
  - O Menino da Terra
  - O Capetinha do Espaço: ou o Menino de Mercúrio
  - Os Meninos de Marte
  - O Menino Que Veio de Vênus
  - Nino, o Menino de Saturno
  - O Menino D´Água e o Planeta Netuno
  - Ju, o Menino de Júpiter: O Maior Menino do Mundo
  - As Cores do Escuro e os Meninos de Plutão
- Menina das Estrelas (2007)
- A Bela Borboleta (2009)
- Meninas (2016)

=== Illustration only ===
- Chapeuzinho Amarelo (1970)
- Pra Boi Dormir (1992)
- Noções de Coisas (1995)
