= List of Troféu Angelo Agostini winners =

This article is a list of winners of Troféu Angelo Agostini, sorted by category.

== Current categories ==
=== Penciller ===
- 1986: Watson Portela
- 1987: Mozart Couto
- 1988: Spacca
- 1989: Laerte
- 1990: Gustavo Machado
- 1991: Hector Gomez
- 1992: Gustavo Machado / Lourenço Mutarelli
- 1993: Marcelo Campos
- 1994: Marcelo Campos
- 1995: Fernando Gonsales
- 1996: Arthur Garcia
- 1997: Sebastião Seabra
- 1998: Marcelo Campos
- 1999: Laerte
- 2000: Marcelo Campos
- 2001: Flavio Colin
- 2002: Flavio Colin
- 2003: Julio Shimamoto
- 2004: Mozart Couto
- 2005: Wanderley Felipe
- 2006: Fábio Moon and Gabriel Bá
- 2007: Fábio Moon and Gabriel Bá
- 2008: Laudo Ferreira Jr.
- 2009: Laudo Ferreira Jr.
- 2010: Adauto Silva
- 2011: Hélcio Rogério
- 2012: Maurílio DNA
- 2013: Danilo Beyruth
- 2014: Shiko
- 2015: Mario Cau
- 2016: Di Amorim
- 2017: Mary Cagnin
- 2018: Mario Cau
- 2019: Mauro Fodra
- 2020: Shiko
- 2021: Laura Athayde
- 2022: Bianca Mól

=== Writer ===
- 1986: Júlio Emílio Braz
- 1987: Gilberto Camargo
- 1988: Fernando Gonsales
- 1989: Luiz Aguiar
- 1990: Novaes
- 1991: Laerte
- 1992: Laerte
- 1993: Laerte
- 1994: Marcelo Campos
- 1995: Arthur Garcia
- 1996: Lúcia Nóbrega
- 1997: Laerte
- 1998: Marcelo Cassaro
- 1999: Marcelo Cassaro
- 2000: Gian Danton
- 2001: André Diniz
- 2002: Wellington Srbek
- 2003: Wellington Srbek
- 2004: Marcelo Cassaro
- 2005: Fábio Moon and Gabriel Bá
- 2006: Marcatti
- 2007: Anita Costa Prado
- 2008: Anita Costa Prado
- 2009: Daniel Esteves
- 2010: Laudo Ferreira Jr.
- 2011: Marcos Franco
- 2012: Daniel Esteves
- 2013: Petra Leão
- 2014: Gustavo Duarte
- 2015: Felipe Cagno
- 2016: Alex Mir
- 2017: Alex Mir
- 2018: Marcelo Marchi
- 2019: Rafael Calça
- 2020: Fefê Torquato
- 2021: Mary Cagnin
- 2022: Leandro Assis and Triscila Oliveira

=== Release ===
- 1986: Chiclete com Banana, by Angeli (Circo) / Revista Medo, by many authors (Press)
- 1987: Bundha, by many authors (Press)
- 1988: Radar, by many authors (Press)
- 1989: Seleções do Quadrix: Garra Cinzenta, by Francisco Armond and Renato Silva (Waz)
- 1990: Menino Maluquinho, by many authors (Abril)
- 1991: Piratas do Tietê, by Laerte (Circo)
- 1992: Graphic Trapa, by many authors (Abril)
- 1993: Pau-Brasil, by many authors (Vidente)
- 1994: SemiDeuses, by Alessandro A. Librandi and Walter Jr. (Saga)
- 1995: Mulher-Diaba no Rastro de Lampião, by Ataíde Braz and Flavio Colin (Nova Sampa)
- 1996: Coleção Assombração, by many authors (Ediouro)
- 1997: Gibizão da Turma da Mônica, by many authors (Globo)
- 1998: Metal Pesado, by many authors (Metal Pesado)
- 1999: Cybercomix, by many authors (Bookmakers)
- 2000: O Dobro de Cinco, by Lourenço Mutarelli (Devir)
- 2001: Fawcett, by André Diniz and Flavio Colin (Nona Arte)
- 2002: Fábrica de Quadrinhos 2001, by many authors (Devir)
- 2003: Madame Satã, by Luiz Antonio Aguiar e Júlio Shimamoto (Opera Graphica)
- 2004: Roko-Loko e Adrina-Lina, by Marcio Baraldi (Opera Graphica)
- 2005: Roko-Loko e Adrina-Lina Atacam Novamente, by Marcio Baraldi (Opera Graphica)
- 2006: Tattoo Zinho, by Marcio Baraldi (Opera Graphica)
- 2007: Katita - Tiras Sem Preconceito, by Anita Costa Prado and Ronaldo Mendes (Marca de Fantasia)
- 2008: Menino Caranguejo, by Chicolam (Splinter Comics)
- 2009: Menina Infinito, by Fábio Lyra (Desiderata)
- 2010: Roko-Loko - Hey Ho, Let's Go!, by Marcio Brandi (Rock Brigade)
- 2011: Bando de dois, by Danilo Beyruth (Zarabatana)
- 2012: Ação Magazine, by many authors (Lancaster)
- 2013: Astronauta - Magnetar, by Danilo Beyruth (Panini)
- 2014: Meninos e Dragões, by Lucio Luiz and Flavio Soares (Abril)
- 2015: Yeshuah - Onde tudo está, by Laudo Ferreira Jr. (Devir)
- 2016: Valkíria - A fonte da juventude, by Alex Mir and Alex Genaro (Draco)
- 2017: Spectrus - Paralisia do Sono, by Thiago Spyked (Crás)
- 2018: Labirinto, by Thiago Souto (Mino)
- 2019: Gibi de Menininha, by Germana Viana, Renata C B Lzz, Roberta Cirne, Camila Suzuki, Mari Santtos, Clarice França, Katia Schittine, Fabiana Signorini, Milena Azevedo, Carol Pimentel, Ana Recalde, Talessa K and Camila Torrano (Zarabatana)
- 2020: Contos dos Orixás, by Hugo Canuto (Ébórá Comics Group)
- 2021: Apagão: Fruto Proibido, by Raphael Fernandes, Abel and Fabi Marques (Draco)
- 2022: Confinada, by Leandro Assis and Triscila Oliveira (Todavia)

=== Jayme Cortez Trophy ===
- 1988: Marcatti
- 1989: Jal and Gualberto
- 1990: Franco de Rosa
- 1991: Franco de Rosa
- 1992: Worney Almeida de Souza
- 1993: Gibiteca Henfil
- 1994: Edgard Guimarães
- 1995: Edgard Guimarães
- 1996: Edgard Guimarães
- 1997: Edgard Guimarães
- 1998: Editora Metal Pesado
- 1999: Editora Bookmakers
- 2000: Edgard Guimarães
- 2001: Edgard Guimarães
- 2002: Editora Opera Graphica
- 2003: Editora Opera Graphica
- 2004: André Diniz / Sidney Gusman / Editora Opera Graphica
- 2005: Roberto Guedes
- 2006: Bigorna.net
- 2007: Edgard Guimarães
- 2008: Eloyr Pacheco
- 2009: Coletivo Quarto Mundo
- 2010: José Salles
- 2011: José Salles
- 2012: Festival Internacional de Quadrinhos
- 2013: Gibicon
- 2014: Sidney Gusman
- 2015: Confraria do Gibi
- 2016: Gibiteca de Santos
- 2017: Ivan Freitas da Costa
- 2018: Fabio Tatsubô
- 2019: Quadrinhos (exhibition in São Paulo Museum of Image and Sound)
- 2020: Butantã Gibicon
- 2021: Mina de HQ magazine
- 2022: Alessandro Garcia

=== Fanzine ===
- 1993: Panacea
- 1994: Panacea
- 1995: Marvel News
- 1996: Informativo de Quadrinhos Independentes
- 1997: Informativo de Quadrinhos Independentes
- 1998: Informativo de Quadrinhos Independentes
- 1999: Mocinhos e Bandidos
- 2000: Quadrinhos Independentes
- 2001: Quadrinhos Independentes
- 2002: Quadrinhos Independentes
- 2003: Quadrinhos Independentes
- 2004: Quadrinhos Independentes
- 2005: Quadrinhos Independentes
- 2006: Quadrinhos Independentes
- 2007: Justiça Eterna
- 2008: Justiça Eterna
- 2009: Quadrinhos Independentes
- 2010: QI
- 2011: QI
- 2012: Miséria
- 2013: Quadrante Sul
- 2014: Quadrinhos Ácidos
- 2015: 3ADFZPA - Terceiro Anuário de Fanzines, Zines e Publicações alternativas
- 2016: Peibê
- 2017: Café Ilustrado
- 2018: Tchê
- 2019: Credo, que delícia
- 2020: Vigilante Rodoviário
- 2021: Peibê
- 2022: Tchê

=== Editorial Cartoonist, Political Cartoonist or Caricaturist ===
- 2003: Cláudio / Spacca / Marcio Baraldi / Lupin / Bira Dantas
- 2004: Bira Dantas / Marcio Baraldi
- 2005: Marcio Baraldi
- 2006: Bira Dantas
- 2007: Marcio Baraldi
- 2008: Marcio Baraldi
- 2009: Marcio Baraldi
- 2010: Sivanildo Sill
- 2011: Marcio Baraldi
- 2012: Gustavo Duarte
- 2013: Jean Galvão
- 2014: Angeli
- 2015: DaCosta
- 2016: Brum
- 2017: Carlos Henrique Guabiras
- 2018: Guilherme Bandeira
- 2019: Carol Andrade
- 2020: Laerte
- 2021: Nando Motta
- 2022: Renato Aroeira

=== Independent Release ===
- 2011: Lucas da Vila de Sant'anna da Feira, by Marcos Franco, Marcelo Lima and Hélcio Rogério
- 2012: Love Hurts, by Murilo Martins
- 2013: Last RPG Fantasy, by Yoshi Itice, Marcel Keiiche and Kendy Saito
- 2014: Plataforma HQ, by many authors
- 2015: Nenhum dia sem um traço, by Ernani Cousandier
- 2016: Nos bastidores da Bíblia - Êxodo, by Carlos Ruas and Leonardo Maciel
- 2017: Protocolo: A Ordem, by Thiago da Silva Mota and Ton Marx
- 2018: Bilhetes, by many authors
- 2019: Saudade, by Melissa Garabeli and Phellip Willian
- 2020: Orixás: Ikú, by Alex Mir
- 2021: Quarentena em Quadrinhos, by Rose Araujo
- 2022: Não Ligue, Isso É Coisa de Mulher!, by Bianca Mól, Eliane Bonadio, Fabiana Signorini, Flávia Gasi, Ligia Zanella, Luiza Lemos, Mari Santtos, Nanda Alves, Renata C B Lzz and Roberta Cirne

=== Webcomic ===
- 2015: Blue e os Gatos, by Paulo Kielwagen
- 2016: Nuvens de Verão, by Charles Lindberg and Israel de Oliveira
- 2017: Marco e Seus Amigos, by Tako X and Alessandra Freitas
- 2018: Na Mira da Lena, by Luciano Freitas
- 2019: Armandinho, by Alexandre Beck
- 2020: Capirotinho, by Guilherme Infante
- 2021: Téo & o Mini Mundo, by Caetano Cury
- 2022: Téo & o Mini Mundo, by Caetano Cury

=== Colorist ===
- 2019: Cris Peter
- 2020: May Cagnin
- 2021: Fabi Marques
- 2022: Orlandeli

=== Children's Release ===
- 2020: Como Fazer Amigos e Enfrentar Fantasmas, by Gustavo Borges and Eric Peleias
- 2021: Jeremias: Alma, by Rafael Calça e Jefferson Costa
- 2022: Chico Bento: Verdade, by Orlandeli

== Extra categories ==
In some years, there were extra categories that were not later incorporated into the main award.

=== Special trophy ===
- 1987: Union of Journalists of São Paulo / Jayme Cortez (for 50 years dedicated to comics)

=== Art-technique (colorist and letterer) ===
- 2003: Alexandre Silva / Lilian Mitsunaga / André Vazzios / André Hernandez / Alexandre Jubran
- 2004: Alexandre Jubran / André Vazzios

=== Inker ===
- 2003: Erica Awano / Emir Ribeiro / Marcelo Borba / Sílvio Spotti / Omar Viñole
- 2004: Mozart Couto / Renato Guedes

=== Publisher ===
- 2003: Franco de Rosa / Carlos Mann / Roberto Guedes / André Diniz / Edgard Guimarães
- 2004: Bira / Marcio Baraldi

=== School ===
- 2003: Impacto / Quanta / Esa / Graphis / Abra

=== Classic publishing house ===
- 2003: D-Arte / Ebal / Vecchi / Grafipar / GEP

=== Current publishing house ===
- 2003: Escala / Via Lettera / Devir / O Pasquim / Virgo

=== Comic store ===
- 2003: Comix Book Shop / Revistas & Cia / Point HQ / Banca Flávio / Itiban Comic Shop

=== Friend of the national comic ===
- 2003: Cida Cândido / Gonçalo Junior / Gualberto Costa / Sidney Gusman / Giovanni Voltolini

=== Institution ===
- 2003: Gibiteca de Curitiba / Gibiteca Henfil / Salão de Humor de Piracicaba / Núcleo de Quadrinhos da FAU

=== Hermes Tadeu Special Award - colorist ===
- 2005: Diogo Saito

== Winners by year ==
The year refers to the year the award was presented. The winners are based on production from the previous year.

- 1st Troféu Angelo Agostini (1985)
- 2nd Troféu Angelo Agostini (1986)
- 3rd Troféu Angelo Agostini (1987)
- 4th Troféu Angelo Agostini (1988)
- 5th Troféu Angelo Agostini (1989)
- 6th Troféu Angelo Agostini (1990
- 7th Troféu Angelo Agostini (1991)
- 8th Troféu Angelo Agostini (1992)
- 9th Troféu Angelo Agostini (1993)
- 10th Troféu Angelo Agostini (1994)
- 11th Troféu Angelo Agostini (1995)
- 12th Troféu Angelo Agostini (1996)
- 13th Troféu Angelo Agostini (1997)
- 14th Troféu Angelo Agostini (1998)
- 15th Troféu Angelo Agostini (1999)
- 16th Troféu Angelo Agostini (2000)
- 17th Troféu Angelo Agostini (2001)
- 18th Troféu Angelo Agostini (2002)
- 19th Troféu Angelo Agostini (2003)
- 20th Troféu Angelo Agostini (2004)
- 21st Troféu Angelo Agostini (2005)
- 22nd Troféu Angelo Agostini (2006)
- 23rd Troféu Angelo Agostini (2007)
- 24th Troféu Angelo Agostini (2008)
- 25th Troféu Angelo Agostini (2009)
- 26th Troféu Angelo Agostini (2010)
- 27th Troféu Angelo Agostini (2011)
- 28th Troféu Angelo Agostini (2012)
- 29th Troféu Angelo Agostini (2013)
- 30th Troféu Angelo Agostini (2014)
- 31st Troféu Angelo Agostini (2015)
- 32nd Troféu Angelo Agostini (2016)
- 33rd Troféu Angelo Agostini (2017)
- 34th Troféu Angelo Agostini (2018)
- 35th Troféu Angelo Agostini (2019)
- 36th Troféu Angelo Agostini (2020)
- 37th Troféu Angelo Agostini (2021)
- 38th Troféu Angelo Agostini (2022)
- 39th Troféu Angelo Agostini (2023)
- 40th Troféu Angelo Agostini (2024)
- 41st Troféu Angelo Agostini (2025)
