= 37th Troféu HQ Mix =

- Awarded for: Brazilian comics
- Sponsored by: ACB and IMAG
- Date: 2025
- Venue: São Paulo
- Country: Brazil
- Website: https://hqmix.com.br

The 37th Troféu HQ Mix (also spelled Troféu HQMIX) was an event organized by Associação dos Cartunistas do Brasil (ACB) and by Instituto do Memorial das Artes Gráficas do Brasil (IMAG) with the purpose of awarding the best Brazilian comic book publications of 2024 in different categories.

== History ==
Entries for the 37th Troféu HQ Mix were open from January 15 to March 15, 2025. Artists, publishers, and authors could submit comic book publications, events, academic works, and other productions related to comics that were released in Brazil during 2024 (in the case of academic works, based in the defense's date). Registration of works and authors was done through the award's official website, and the finalists were announced on September 4.

On October 3, it was announced that this year's trophy would represent the character Tiodora, from the graphic novel Mukanda Tiodora, by Marcelo D'Salete, who was also announced as one of the winners of the grand master of national comics award, alongside Maurício Pestana. The trophy design changes each year to honor different Brazilian comics artists and characters, and this time it was developed by artist Bruno Neves Braga, founding partner of the Instituto Impressão 3D from Pernambuco.

The list of nominees for Troféu HQ Mix was released on November 8th after analysis by a technical jury composed of comics journalists and critics. There were more than 1,500 entries and five months of evaluation by the jury members. With the exception of the categories of graphic design, editorial design, international relevance, grand master, and grand tribute, whose winners are determined by the organizing committee, the other categories had their voting open to approximately 2,000 comics professionals registered as voters from September 10 to 25, 2025. The judging committee was composed of Anne Quiangala, Nara Bretas Lage, Thiago de Barros Carneiro, Natania Aparecida da Silva Nogueira, José Alberto Lovetro, and Daniela Baptista (committee president).

The categories related to academic research (thesis, dissertation, and final course work) also had a specialized judging committee, coordinated by Sonia Bibe Luyten and with the participation of Ricardo Jorge, Waldomiro Vergueiro, Carlos Alberto Machado, and Nobuyoshi Chinen.

The results were announced on November 8, 2025, on the official Troféu HQ Mix website. The awards ceremony took place on December 10, 2025, at the Raul Cortez Theater, SESC 14 Bis, in São Paulo, hosted by Serginho Groisman and featuring DJ MZK, and was broadcast on the official HQ Mix YouTube channel.

One of the main highlights of the HQ Mix Trophy this year was the number of nominations and wins for artists from the North region of Brazil, respectively 14 nominations and 4 trophies, won by comics artists Luiz Andrade (for the exhibition Sangue, Suor e Nanquim), TAI and NIL (both in three categories for the graphic novel Onde Habita o Medo).

== Winners and nominees ==
Category	Winner(s)	Nominees
Adaptation for Comics	Quarto de Despejo; Triscila Oliveira, Preta Ilustra, Hely de Brito and Emanuelly Araujo (Ática)	A Estrada, by Manu Larcenet (Pipoca & Nanquim); A Revolução dos Bichos em Quadrinhos, by Yuri Andrey, Pedro Okuyama and Laís Bicudo (Principis); Frankenstein, by George Bess (Risco); Morte e Vida Severina, by Odyr (Quadrinhos na Cia.); Música Popular em Quadrinhos: Samba, by Ilustralu, Rafael Calça, Tainan Rocha, Karmaleão, Leandro Assis, Evandro Alves, Odyr, Christiano Mascaro and André Diniz (Brasa); Não Sou Orlando, by Helena Cunha (independente); Noite de Almirante e Outros Contos de Machado de Assis, by Germana Viana (Editora do Brasil); Pocahontas, by Patrick Prugne (Taverna do Rei); Senhor Das Moscas em Quadrinhos, by Aimée de Jongh (Suma); Teen Orixás Go! volume 3: O Acarajé Lendário, by Rafa Bonfim (Mingos); Vidas Secas em HQ, by Severino Rodrigues and Débora Santos (Editora do Brasil)
National Inker	Jefferson Costa; Quando Nasce a Autoestima?	Al Stefano (Em Cantos da Mata); Amanda Freitas (The Flower Pot: O Começo); Amanda Miranda (Braba: Antologia Brasileira de Quadrinhos); André Caliman (Era Uma Vez no Contestado); Guilherme Petreca (Superpunk); Hely de Brito and Emanuelly Araujo (Quarto de Despejo); Hiro Kawahara (Yowiya); Marcelo Costa (Capitão Feio: Memórias); Mario Cau (Residiuum: Tales Of Coral nº 1); Wander Antunes (O Silêncio e a Tempestade)
National Colorist	Verônica Berta; Marina: Expressão	Amanda Miranda (Braba: Antologia Brasileira de Quadrinhos); Diogo Mendes (Ringue); Fred Rubim (Le Chevalier e a Volta ao Mundo em 80 Horas); Germana Viana (Orixás: Griô); Janis Ierullo (Capa de Culpa); Jefferson Costa (Quando Nasce a Autoestima?); Mariane Gusmão (Coringa: O Mundo); Piero Bagnariol (Luzia e os Povos do Brasil); Pris Gallicchio (Colorindo a Dor); Thais Leal (Monstros Não Dizem Adeus); Wander Antunes (O Silêncio e a Tempestade)
National Artist	Jefferson Costa; Quando Nasce a Autoestima?	Alcimar Frazão (A Filha do Homem); Aline Zouvi (Pigmento); Bianca Mól (Zuri); Bianca Pinheiro (O Menino de Ouro & A Caixa de Alcebias); Braziliano (Valongo); Germana Viana (Gibi de Menininha: Damas da Noite); Gustavo Duarte (DC Sem Palavras); Preta Ilustra (Quarto de Despejo); Talles Rodrigues (Mayara & Annabelle: Conflitos Internos); Thiago Souto (O Teatro Fantasma); Verônica Berta (Marina: Expressão)
Master's Thesis	Obras abertas em quadrinhos: estratégias semióticas de abertura no campo da manualidade Lya Brasil Calvet (Universidade Federal do Ceará)	Selected by the expert jury
Master's Thesis	Purgatório: a construção de si nas histórias em quadrinhos autobiográficas Ana Carolina Oliveira (Universidade Federal do Rio de Janeiro)	Selected by the expert jury
Foreign Special Edition	O Eternauta: Edição Definitiva; Héctor Germán Oesterheld and Francisco Solano López (Pipoca & Nanquim)	Céleste e Proust, by Chloé Cruchaudet (Nemo); Dark Spaces: Wildfire, by Scott Snyder, Hayden Sherman and Ronda Pattison (Taverna do Rei); DC Sem Palavras, by Gustavo Duarte (Panini); Diário de Oaxaca, by Peter Kuper (Marsupial); É Solitário no Centro da Terra, by Zoe Thorogood (Conrad); Meu Amigo Kim Jong-Um, by Keum Suk Gendry-Kim (Pipoca & Nanquim); Minha Coisa Favorita É Monstro: Livro Dois, by Emil Ferris (Quadrinhos na Cia.); Mulher Vida Liberdade, by Marjane Satrapi, organizadora (Quadrinhos na Cia.); Odile e Os Crocodilos, by Chantal Montellier (Comix Zone!); Pagar a Terra, by Joe Sacco (Quadrinhos na Cia.); Roaming, by Jillian Tamaki and Mariko Tamaki (Nversos)
National Special Edition	Quando Nasce a Autoestima? Regiane Braz and Jefferson Costa (Trem Fantasma)	As Sereias de Haarlem, by Felipe Pan and Gio Guimarães (Nemo); Bem-Vinda de Volta, by Paola Yuu Tabata (Seguinte); Carimbê: Uma História do Capão Pecado, by Ferréz and Doug Firmino (Comix Zone!); Do Contra: Herança, by Yoshi Itice (Panini); Júlio Lancellotti #Acolhe, by Rogério Faria, Laudo Ferreira, Lila Cruz, Danilo Dias and Pedro Balduíno (Draco); Laerte Total Gigante volume 1, by Laerte Coutinho (Z Edições); Marina: Expressão, by Verônica Berta (Panini); Música Popular em Quadrinhos: Samba, by Ilustralu, Rafael Calça, Tainan Rocha, Karmaleão, Leandro Assis, Evandro Alves, Odyr, Christiano Mascaro and André Diniz (Brasa); Muzinga, by André Diniz (Comix Zone!); Não Sou Orlando, by Helena Cunha (independente); Pigmento, by Aline Zouvi (Quadrinhos na Cia.)
Publisher of the Year	Brasa	Comix Zone!; Conrad; Draco; JBC; Nemo; Pipoca & Nanquim; Quadrinhos na Cia.; Risco; Veneta; Zapata
Event	12º Festival Internacional de Quadrinhos	1º Encontro Internacional da ASPAS; 6ª CDQ CON: Feira de Quadrinhos; 6ª Semana do Quadrinho Nacional de Manaus; 40 Anos de Rê Bordosa: A Festa da Porraloca; 51º Salão Internacional de Humor de Piracicaba; Educa HQ; Poc Con 2024; Sesc Geek Literacon; Top! Top! Convenção Paraibana de Quadrinhos: 7ª Edição; Virada Nerd e o Dia do Quadrinho Grátis
Exhibition	Sangue, Suor e Nanquim; Luiz Andrade, curador / 6ª Semana do Quadrinho Nacional de Manaus	51º Salão Internacional de Humor de Piracicaba; Heróis DC (Morumbi Shopping); Negreiros (Ivan Freitas da Costa, curador / Quanta Academia de Artes); Nos Braços do Violeiro (João Carlos Villela, curador); Quadrinhos Sonoros (Fabrício Martins, curador / 6ª CDQ CON: Feira de Quadrinhos); Reconstruir Sobre o que Apagam: Os Espaços Reimaginados de Ana Koehler e Alves (12º Festival Internacional de Quadrinhos); Sabor Das Cores: Obras e Preparos Artísticos de Carol Rossetti (6ª CDQ CON: Feira de Quadrinhos)
Great Contribution	Brazilian Ministry of Culture, by the law that recognizes cartoons, caricatures, and graffiti as expressions of culture.	Elected by the organizing committee
Great Master of National Comics	Marcelo D'Salete	Elected by the organizing committee
Great Master of National Comics	Maurício Pestana	Elected by the organizing committee
Special Homage	May Solimar, pelo G20 em Quadrinhos	Elected by the organizing committee
Theoretical Book	Arquivo Ota: Um Mergulho na Mente Mais Maluca da HQ Brasileira; Bruno Porto and Marcelo Martinez, organizadores (MMarte)	Branquitude, Representações & Privilégios: Estudo sobre as Identidades Brancas nas Histórias em Quadrinhos, by Elbert Agostinho and Fernanda Pereira da Silva, organizadores (Observatório Carioca de Histórias em Quadrinhos and Studio Patinhas); Histórias em Quadrinhos e Divulgação Científica: As Tiras de Armandinho e um Estudo dos Comentários dos Leitores no Facebook, by Eduarda Fernandes da Rosa (Editora UEMS); Histórias em Quadrinhos e Interdisciplinaridade: Desafios Metodológicos, by Natania Aparecida da Silva Nogueira, Amaro Xavier Braga Jr. and Maiara Alvim de Almeida, organizadores (ASPAS); Humor Gráfico na Alfabetização Visual, by Betania Dantas (Contexto); Imagens Negras nos Quadrinhos, by Fredrik Strömberg (ASPAS); Japão: O Império da Cultura Pop, by Alexandre Nagado (MaisCultura); O Que as Famílias Precisam Saber Sobre Cultura Pop Asiática: Mangás, Animes, Dramas e Música J-, C-, K-Pop, by Ivelise Fortim, João Victor Rezende dos Santos and Maria Thereza de Alencar Lima, organizadores (Homo Ludens); Os Donos da Rua: Representatividade Racial e as Transformações do Protagonismo Negro no Universo Turma da Mônica, by Rodrigo Sérgio F. de Paiva (Appris); Quadrinhos, Comunicação & Entremeios: Diálogos Possíveis volume 1, by Antonio Davi Delfino Ferreira, Lya Brasil Calvet, Márcio Moreira dos Santos Filho, Ricardo Jorge de Lucena Lucas, Soraya Madeira da Silva, Thainá Marques Moreira, Thiago Henrique Gonçalves Alves, organizadores (Oficina Invisível de Investigação em Quadrinhos); Supergays: Mais de 180 Super-Heróis Fora do Armário, by Guilherme Smee (Marsupial)
Manga and Related Productions	Amarelo Seletivo; Ricardo Tayra and Talessak (Conrad)	Astro Boy nº 1, by Osamu Tezuka (JBC); Bruno Tem um Namorado, by Ture (MPEG); Ikkyu nº 3, by Hisashi Sakaguchi (Veneta); Jiraiya: O Novo Império dos Ninjas, by Chris Tex, Santtos and Jhonny Domingos (JBC); O Céu para Conquistar, by Yudori (Conrad); Púrpura, by Paula Zanotelli (independente); Romaria, by Jun Sugiyama and Alexandre Carvalho (JBC); Sailor Moon Eternal Edition nº 1, by Naoko Takeuchi (JBC); Simone, by Douglas Docelino (independente); Yojimbot nº 1, by Sylvain Repos (Conrad)
Manga and Related Productions	Daruma: Perseverança; Monge Han (Pitaya)	Astro Boy nº 1, by Osamu Tezuka (JBC); Bruno Tem um Namorado, by Ture (MPEG); Ikkyu nº 3, by Hisashi Sakaguchi (Veneta); Jiraiya: O Novo Império dos Ninjas, by Chris Tex, Santtos and Jhonny Domingos (JBC); O Céu para Conquistar, by Yudori (Conrad); Púrpura, by Paula Zanotelli (independente); Romaria, by Jun Sugiyama and Alexandre Carvalho (JBC); Sailor Moon Eternal Edition nº 1, by Naoko Takeuchi (JBC); Simone, by Douglas Docelino (independente); Yojimbot nº 1, by Sylvain Repos (Conrad)
New Talent - Artist	Débora Santos; Vidas Secas em HQ	Benitta (Manga e Sal); Cecilia Marins (Passarinho); Cora Ronron (Maldição!!! volume 2); Cucas (Lama); Douglas Docelino (Simone); Magô Pool (Bicho Selvagem); Oberas (Campo de Vaga-Lumes); Ray Cardoso (Maramunhã: Na Terra do Waraná); Robson Moura (Contos Negros); Sasyk (Pillow Talks)
New Talent - Writer	TAI; Onde Habita o Medo	Benitta (Manga e Sal); Jailson Soares and Rafael Moura (Campo de Vaga-Lumes); Kael Vitorelo (Filosofia do Mamilo); Laura Han Jin and Yasmim di Giovanni (Infinitos Dias Restantes); Luiza Lemos (Erotika Occultum); Magô Pool (Bicho Selvagem); Monge Han (Daruma: Perseverança); Nádia Freire (Brado Retumbante); Pris Gallicchio (Colorindo a Dor); Wagner Diesel (Odilo)
Production for Other Languages	Cabeça Oca no Mundo de Cora Coralina [peça de teatro] Christie Queiroz, autor	Além dos Quadros: Memória dos Quadrinhos de Santo André [documentário em curta-metragem] (Thina Curtis, Kash Fyre, Victor Zanellato and Wilian Paiva, produtores); GoeTube: Augusto Paim Entrevista [canal de YouTube] (Augusto Paim, apresentador); Marco e Seus Amigos [animação] (Tako X and Eduardo Moreira, autores); Traços do Amanhã [documentário] (Juliana Oliveira and Felipe Amaral, diretores)
Production for Other Languages	Ogiva: O Mundo Não É Mais Nosso [filme em média-metragem] Cadu Rosenfeld, diretor	Além dos Quadros: Memória dos Quadrinhos de Santo André [documentário em curta-metragem] (Thina Curtis, Kash Fyre, Victor Zanellato and Wilian Paiva, produtores); GoeTube: Augusto Paim Entrevista [canal de YouTube] (Augusto Paim, apresentador); Marco e Seus Amigos [animação] (Tako X and Eduardo Moreira, autores); Traços do Amanhã [documentário] (Juliana Oliveira and Felipe Amaral, diretores)
Editorial Project	Música Popular em Quadrinhos: Samba; Ilustralu, Rafael Calça, Tainan Rocha, Karmaleão, Leandro Assis, Evandro Alves, Odyr, Christiano Mascaro and André Diniz (Brasa)	Eleito pela comissão organizadora
Graphic Project	Minha Coisa Favorita É Monstro: Livro Dois; Emil Ferris (Quadrinhos na Cia.)	Eleito pela comissão organizadora
Adventure/Horror/Fantasy Publication	Onde Habita o Medo; TAI and NIL (Quadrinistas Indígenas)	A Menina Que Vomitava Monstros, by Lil Curto and Lucas Leandro (independente); Cinzas da Memória, by Luma Rodrigues (independente); Condado Maldito nº 8, by Cullen Bunn and Tyler Crook (DarkSide); Contos Negros, by Robson Moura (independente); Crônicas do Horror: O Devorador de Almas, by Marcella Rossetti and Alexandre Bar (Kaiju); Em Cantos da Mata, by Al Stefano (Zapata); Gibi de Menininha: Damas da Noite, by Camila Suzuki, Clarice França, Flávia Gasi, Mari Santtos, Dane Taranha, Fabiana Signorini, Germana Viana, Katia Schittine, Renata C B Lzz and Roberta Cirne (Zarabatana); Kililana Song, by Benjamin Flao (Nemo); Não Se Assuste, Isso É Coisa de Mulher, by Bianca Mól, Eliane Bonadio, Fabiana Signorini, Flávia Gasi, Larissa Palmieri, Lorena Valquíria, Luiza Lemos, Má Matiazi, Mari Santtos, Marília Aguiar, Renata C B Lzz, Roberta Cirne, Tatiana Tatsch and Thina Curtis (independente); No Andar de Baixo, by Cecília Ramos (independente); Quadrinhos Sonoros, by Fabrício Martins, organizador (CDQ CON)
Classic Work Publication	O Eternauta: Edição Definitiva; Héctor Germán Oesterheld and Francisco Solano López (Pipoca & Nanquim)	A Insustentável Leveza do Ser e Outras Histórias, by Laerte Coutinho (Conrad); Astro Boy nº 1, by Osamu Tezuka (JBC); Biblioteca Mauricio de Sousa: Cebolinha 1974, by Mauricio de Sousa (Panini); Biblioteca Mauricio de Sousa: Magali 1989, by Mauricio de Sousa (Panini); Ciranda da Solidão: Edição Deluxe, by Mário César (EntreQuadros); Coleção Crepax: Drácula, Frankenstein e Outras Histórias, by Guido Crepax (Pipoca & Nanquim); Coleção MSP 50, by Sidney Gusman, organizador (Panini); Mortadelo e Salaminho: O Sulfato Atômico, by Francisco Ibáñez (Figura); Os Cavaleiros do Zodíaco: Saint Seiya Final Edition nº 1, by Masami Kurumada (JBC); Sangue & Terror, by Julio Shimamoto (Tábula); Usagi Yojimbo nº 5, by Stan Sakai (Hyperion)
Humor Publication	Linha do Trem: Mas, Doutor... Raphael Salimena (Draco)	A Balada para Passear, by Camilo Solano (Conrad); Cerrado em Quadrinhos, by Alves (Peirópolis); Cuscuz Surpresa, by Helô D'Angelo and Daniel Cesart (independente); DC Sem Palavras, by Gustavo Duarte (Panini); Esquisitona, by Sarah Andersen (Seguinte); Ladras, by Lucie Bryon (Risco); Nós Quatro, by Germana Viana (independente); Só as Melhores, by Paulo Moreira (Conrad); Só com a Gente: Uma Viagem em Quadrinhos ao Deserto do Atacama, by Helô D'Angelo (Bebel); Tirinhas Para Ler Enquanto Enrola na Firma, by Guilherme Infante (independente); Velhos Millennials: Coletânea de Tirinhas, by Gui Bon (independente)
Comic Strip Publication	Cerrado em Quadrinhos; Alves (Peirópolis)	Aprendiz de Bruxa, by Milena Azevedo, Ju Loyola and Mari Santtos (GHP); Batata The Gato: Carmim, by Rebeca Armus (independente); C de Coração: Uma Coletânea de Insights Emocionais, by Aline Cristine (Anticomix); Cuscuz Surpresa, by Helô D'Angelo and Daniel Cesart (independente); Defeito de Fábrica, by Rafa Figueiredo (Umlivro); Infinito Vol. 01; Laerte Total Gigante volume 1, by Laerte Coutinho (Z Edições); Margô, by Luciano Freitas (independente); Só as Melhores, by Paulo Moreira (Conrad); Tirinhas Para Ler Enquanto Enrola na Firma, by Guilherme Infante (independente)
Miniseries Publication	Tools Challenge: Edição Definitiva nº 2 Max Andrade (JBC)	Alack Sinner nº 2, by José Muñoz and Carlos Sampayo (Pipoca & Nanquim); Bitch Planet: Planeta das Vagabundas nº 1-2, by Kelly Sue DeConnick and Valentine de Landro (Conrad); Borboleta Assassina nº 2-3, by Yuka Nagate (Pipoca & Nanquim); Cálculo Renal: As 13 Almas do Joelma, by Raphael Fernandes and Danilo Dias (Draco); Fire! nº 1-2, by Hideko Mizuno (Pipoca & Nanquim); Savants of Sounds nº 4, by Abel, Gabriel Arrais and Rodrigo Catraca (RQT); Serigy: O Herói dos Excluídos, by Marlone Santana (Serigy); Twinkle: A Jornada das Estrelas Gêmeas, by Marina Dutra (Abyme)
Group Independent Publication	Café Espacial nº 22; Sergio Chaves and Lídia Basoli, organizadores (independente)	A Viagem de Maíra, by Mandy Modesto, Felipe Marques, Rafael Gonzaga, Bell Modesto, César Modesto, Keoma Calandrini, Hélio Ramon and Guilherme Souza (independente); Aquele da Capa Azul Com o Título Grande, Leandro Reboredo (independente); Eterno, by Francy Botelho, Marina Pantoja, Lívia and Louise Guimarães and Julia Lustosa (independente); Melhores do Mundo: A Última HQ do MdM (É Verdade Mermo), by vários autores (MdM); Não Se Assuste, Isso É Coisa de Mulher, by Bianca Mól, Eliane Bonadio, Fabiana Signorini, Flávia Gasi, Larissa Palmieri, Lorena Valquíria, Luiza Lemos, Má Matiazi, Mari Santtos, Marília Aguiar, Renata C B Lzz, Roberta Cirne, Tatiana Tatsch and Thina Curtis (independente); No Andar de Baixo, by Cecília Ramos (independente); Orixás: Griô, by Alex Mir, Bruno Brunelli, Germana Viana, Luiza Lemos, Roberta Cirne and Talessak (independente); Quadrinhos À Margem: Narrativas Interioranas sobre Identidade e Pertencimento, by Felipe Furtado, organizador (independente); Quadrinhos Sonoros, by Fabrício Martins, organizador (CDQ CON)
Group Independent Publication	Almanaque Kitembo 2K24: Quadrinhos Afrofuturistas vários autores (Kitembo)	
One-Shot Independent Publication	Onde Habita o Medo; TAI and NIL (Quadrinistas Indígenas)	A Menina Que Vomitava Monstros, by Lil Curto and Lucas Leandro (independente); Belmonte: O Cavaleiro da Triste Figura, by Rai Guimarães (independente); Campo de Vaga-Lumes, by Jailson Soares, Rafael Moura and Oberas (independente); Capa de Culpa, by Lucas Oda and Janine Ierullo (independente); Cinzas da Memória, by Luma Rodrigues (independente); Ciranda da Solidão: Edição Deluxe, by Mário César (EntreQuadros); Mais uma História para o Velho Smith, by Orlandeli (independente); Manga e Sal, by Rebecca Nitta (independente); Não Sou Orlando, by Helena Cunha (independente); O Feminismo que eu Comprei, by Lila Cruz (independente); Sendo Mulher Errado, by Má Matiazi (independente); Simone, by Douglas Docelino (independente)
Serialized Independent Publication	Não Se Assuste, Isso É Coisa de Mulher; Bianca Mól, Eliane Bonadio, Fabiana Signorini, Flávia Gasi, Larissa Palmieri, Lorena Valquíria, Luiza Lemos, Má Matiazi, Mari Santtos, Marília Aguiar, Renata C B Lzz, Roberta Cirne, Tatiana Tatsch and Thina Curtis (independente)	Almanaque Kitembo 2K24: Quadrinhos Afrofuturistas de vários autores (Kitembo); Asas da Vingança, by Fralvez (Pé-de-Cabra); Cara-Unicórnio Vol. 1, by Adri A. (independente); Espera; Monstros Não Dizem Adeus, by Thais Leal and Guilherme de Sousa (independente); Nós Quatro, by Germana Viana (independente); O Jardim das Fadas Selvagens, by Mireli Oliveira (independente); O Retrato Inacabado de Madame Bardin, by Lari Macedo (independente); Orixás: Griô, by Alex Mir, Bruno Brunelli, Germana Viana, Luiza Lemos, Roberta Cirne and Talessak (independente); Purgatório: A Cozinha Fica Aqui, by Ana Carolina Oliveira (independente)
Children's Publication	Do Contra: Herança; Yoshi Itice (Panini)	A Viagem de Maíra, by Mandy Modesto, Felipe Marques, Rafael Gonzaga, Bell Modesto, César Modesto, Keoma Calandrini, Hélio Ramon and Guilherme Souza (independente); Maramunhã: Na Terra do Waraná, by Evaldo Vasconcelos, Ray Cardoso, Malika Dahil and Izabelle Regina (independente); Meninas, by Amma and Angélica Kalil (Veneta); Mila e Milio em Orques e Crepiocas, by Alexandre Esquitini, Emilio Garcia, Mila Massuda and Rodrigo de Freitas (Mistifório); Monstros Não Dizem Adeus, by Thais Leal and Guilherme de Sousa (independente); Ninguém Trabalha Mais do que as Operárias, by Wagner Willian (independente); Santuário dos Dinossauros, by Itaru Kinoshita and Shin-Ichi Fujiwara (MPEG); Sonho de Herói, by Leonardo Cássio and Erik Cruz (Baderna Literária); Teen Orixás Go! volume 3: O Acarajé Lendário, by Rafa Bonfim (Mingos); Zuri, by Eliane Bonadio and Bianca Mól (independente)
Youth Publication	Quando Nasce a Autoestima? Regiane Braz and Jefferson Costa (Trem Fantasma)	A Menina Que Vomitava Monstros, by Lil Curto and Lucas Leandro (independente); Achados & Perdidos, by Mario Oshiro and Dominic Amaral (Srkipt); Ladras, by Lucie Bryon (Risco); Lama, by Ea Damaia and Cucas (independente); Marina: Expressão, by Verônica Berta (Panini); Onde Habita o Medo, by TAI and NIL (Quadrinistas Indígenas); Orixás: Griô, by Alex Mir, Bruno Brunelli, Germana Viana, Luiza Lemos, Roberta Cirne and Talessak (independente); Pigmento, by Aline Zouvi (Quadrinhos na Cia.); Só com a Gente: Uma Viagem em Quadrinhos ao Deserto do Atacama, by Helô D'Angelo (Bebel); Toda Crespa, by Isabella Ismile (independente); Zuri, by Eliane Bonadio and Bianca Mól (independente)
Mix Publication	Gibi de Menininha: Damas da Noite; Camila Suzuki, Clarice França, Flávia Gasi, Mari Santtos, Dane Taranha, Fabiana Signorini, Germana Viana, Katia Schittine, Renata C B Lzz and Roberta Cirne (Zarabatana)	Almanaque Kitembo 2K24: Quadrinhos Afrofuturistas, by vários autores (Kitembo); Arreda!, by vários autores (Copo Sujo); Coleção MSP 50, by Sidney Gusman, organizador (Panini); Crônicas da Augusta, by Yuri Andrey, organizador (Tábula); Júlio Lancellotti #Acolhe, by Rogério Faria, Laudo Ferreira, Lila Cruz, Danilo Dias and Pedro Balduíno (Draco); Mulher Vida Liberdade, by Marjane Satrapi, organizadora (Quadrinhos na Cia.); Não Se Assuste, Isso É Coisa de Mulher, by Bianca Mól, Eliane Bonadio, Fabiana Signorini, Flávia Gasi, Larissa Palmieri, Lorena Valquíria, Luiza Lemos, Má Matiazi, Mari Santtos, Marília Aguiar, Renata C B Lzz, Roberta Cirne, Tatiana Tatsch and Thina Curtis (independente); O Outro Lado do Mucuruçá, by Francy Botelho, Fabiana Pina, Milton Santos and Sérgio Angelim (independente); Quadrinhos Sonoros, by Fabrício Martins, organizador (CDQ CON); Música Popular em Quadrinhos: Samba, by Ilustralu, Rafael Calça, Tainan Rocha, Karmaleão, Leandro Assis, Evandro Alves, Odyr, Christiano Mascaro and André Diniz (Brasa); Vozes Da Marvel: Orgulho nº 3, by vários autores (Panini)
International Relevance	Anderson Shon and Daniel Cesart	Eleitos pela comissão organizadora
National Writer	Regiane Braz; Quando Nasce a Autoestima?	Alex Mir (Orixás: Griô); Aline Zouvi (Pigmento); Felipe Castilho (Coringa: O Mundo); Felipe Pan (As Sereias de Haarlem); Ferréz (Carimbê: Uma História do Capão Pecado); Helena Cunha (Não Sou Orlando); Orlandeli (Mais uma História para o Velho Smith); Triscila Oliveira (Quarto de Despejo); Verônica Berta (Marina: Expressão); Wander Antunes (O Silêncio e a Tempestade)
Doctoral Thesis	Quadrinhos Famintos: A 9ª Arte Como Linguagem do Limiar; Nathalia Xavier Thomaz (Universidade de São Paulo)	Selected by the expert jury
Final Course Project	Laboratório de Quadrinhos: Memórias e Modos Experimentais de Construir Narrativas; Carlos Vinícius Jenisch da Silva (Universidade Federal do Rio Grande do Sul)	Selected by the expert jury
Webcomics	Homem-Grilo; Cadu Simões and Fred Hildebrand	Cuscuz Surpresa, by Helô D'Angelo and Daniel Cesart; Dandara: A Filha do Fogo, by Jean Lins; Manifesto de uma Lésbica de 20 Anos, by Júpiter Uchoa; Memória em Quadrinhos, by Toni Rodrigues; Memórias da Intifada, by Norberto Liberator; Pillow Talks, by Sasyk; Planeta em Colapso: Reportagem em Quadrinhos sobre a Enchente no Rio Grande do Sul, by Pablito Aguiar; Rios de Junho: Performances e Governamentalidade nas ruas de 2013, by Carlos Daniel Medeiros; Sonhando com Coragem, by Giulia Crovador; Um Quadrinho pra falar de Vulvodínia, by Lari Macedo
Web Comic Strip	Cerrado em Quadrinhos; Alves	As Tirinhas de Helô D'Angelo, by Helô D'Angelo; Batatinha Fantasma, by Carol Borges and Filipe Remedios; Cartumante, by Cecília Ramos; Cecilia Marins; Coletivo Educartum; Cuscuz Surpresa, by Helô D'Angelo and Daniel Cesart; Helô Rodrigues; Joãozim; Sofia e Otto, by Pedro Leite; Tirinhas da Carol Ito, by Carol Ito
