= 41st Troféu Angelo Agostini =

- Awarded for: Brazilian comics
- Sponsored by: AQC-ESP
- Date: 2025
- Venue: São Paulo
- Country: Brazil
- Website: https://angeloagostini.com.br

The 41st Troféu Angelo Agostini was an event organized by the Associação dos Quadrinhistas e Caricaturistas do Estado de São Paulo (AQC-ESP) with the purpose of awarding the best Brazilian comics works of 2024 in different categories.

== History ==
Following a special event honoring the 40th anniversary of the Troféu Angelo Agostini, held between October 3rd and 5th, 2025, the organizing committee announced some new developments, including updating the names of the three categories related to works, which changed from "Lançamento" ("Release") to "Quadrinho" ("Comic Book"), "Quadrinho independente" ("Independent Comic Book") and "Quadrinho infantil" ("Children's Comic Book"). The category "Cartunista, chargista ou caricaturista" ("Editorial Cartoonist, Political Cartoonist or Caricaturist") was also renamed "Desenhista de Humor Gráfico" ("Graphic Humor Artist").

Another new development was the creation of the category "Desenhista/Roteirista" ("Artist/Writer"), aimed at authors simultaneously responsible for the drawings and scripts of Brazilian comics published in the year prior to the award edition, meaning that the "Artist" and "Writer" categories now focus on professionals who have drawn from scripts by other people and vice versa.

Finally, three special categories were presented (the last time this occurred was in the 2005 edition): "Editor", "Specialized Journalist" and "Podcaster or YouTuber". It was also announced that, in 2026, three other special categories, different from these, will be announced.

The nominees were announced on December 2, 2025, and the popular vote was held from December 3 to 19. The four selected as Masters of National Comics were announced on December 12.

The winners were announced on December 22, and the awards ceremony will take place in 2026, at an in-person event that will also involve the 42nd edition of the award in a format similar to the special event for the 40th anniversary of the Troféu Angelo Agostini in 2025.

== Winner and nominees ==
Category	Winner(s)	Nominees
Master of National Comics	Adão Iturrusgarai	Elected by the organizing committee
Master of National Comics	Gian Danton	Elected by the organizing committee
Master of National Comics	Márcia D'Haese	Elected by the organizing committee
Master of National Comics	Zélio Alves Pinto	Elected by the organizing committee
Comic Book	Gibi de Menininha: Damas da Noite; Camila Suzuki, Clarice França, Flávia Gasi, Mari Santtos, Dane Taranha, Fabiana Signorini, Germana Viana, Kátia Schittine, Renata C B Lzz and Roberta Cirne (Zarabatana)	Era Uma Vez no Contestado, by André Caliman (Figura); Filosofia do Mamilo, by Kael Vitorelo (Veneta); Intempol: Agora Volume 2, by Luma Rodrigues, Lúcio Manfredi, Luís Felipe Vasques, André Flauzino, Will Tom, Rubens Ângelo, Alexandre Soares, Mariana Queiroz, Ana Carolina Recalde, Mig Mendes, Octavio Aragão, Alexandre Mandarino, Hamilton Kabuna and Carlos Hollanda (Infinitum/Caligari); Muzinga, by André Diniz (Comix Zone!); O Homem do Lado de Fora, by Laudo Ferreira and Rodrigo Mazer (Jupati); O Teatro Fantasma, by Thiago Souto (Conrad); Pigmento, by Aline Zouvi (Quadrinhos na Cia.); Quando Nasce a Autoestima?, by Regiane Braz and Jefferson Costa (Trem Fantasma); Quarto de Despejo, by Triscila Oliveira, Preta Ilustra, Hely de Brito and Emanuelly Araujo (Ática)
Independent Comic Book	Orixás: Griô; Alex Mir, Bruno Brunelli, Germana Viana, Luiza Lemos, Roberta Cirne and Talessak (independent)	A Grande Aventura de Moacy Cirne em Quadrinhos, by Luiz Elson Dantas (independent); Abandonado Por Elena, by Gabriel Dantas (independent); Não Se Assuste, Isso É Coisa de Mulher, by Bianca Mól, Eliane Bonadio, Fabiana Signorini, Flávia Gasi, Larissa Palmieri, Lorena Valquíria, Luiza Lemos, Má Matiazi, Mari Santtos, Marília Aguiar, Renata C B Lzz, Roberta Cirne, Tatiana Tatsch and Thina Curtis (independent); Mais uma História para o Velho Smith, by Orlandeli (independent); Não Sou Orlando, by Helena Cunha (independent); Onde Habita o Medo, by TAI and NIL (Quadrinistas Indígenas); Receitas Para (Fingir Que Sabe) Confeitar, by Digo Freitas (independent); Terror em Nanquim 2, by Mhorgana Alessandra, Felipe Manhães, Felipe Tazzo, Nicolas Santos, Rodrigo Ortiz Vinholo, Mari Rolin, Marlos Quintanilha, Marília Aguiar, JP Schimidt and Eder Modanez (independent); Trabalho de Ciências, by Guilherme de Sousa (independent)
Children's Comic Book	Toda Crespa; Isabella Ismile (independent)	Aprendiz de Bruxa, by Milena Azevedo, Ju Loyola e Mari Santtos (GHP); As Aventuras do Homem-Chiclete, by Ede Galileu, Edde Wagner, Al Stefano and CMK (Heroica); Maramunhã: Na Terra do Waraná, by Evaldo Vasconcelos, Ray Cardoso, Malika Dahil and Izabelle Regina (independent); Marina: Expressão, by Verônica Berta (Panini); Meu Gibizinho TEA 2, by Gabriel Sorriso (independent); Monstros Não Dizem Adeus, by Thais Leal and Guilherme de Sousa (independent); Super, by Gui Lipari (independent); Teen Orixás Go! e Outras Histórias, by Rafa Bonfim (Mingos); Zuri, by Eliane Bonadio and Bianca Mól (independent)
Fanzine	Por Que Chora? Renata C B Lzz	Aisha e o Ghoul, by Samir Mourad; Cocó Contos, by Vivian & Rafael Munhoz; Corpo Rascunho, by Daniel Figueiredo; CosmoAgonia Parte IV: Ou Sobre a Origem da Dúvida, by Daniel Figueiredo; Desvios Transtornates Zero, by Luana Cristini; Diário de Campo I: Uma Crônica Cemiterial, by Daniel Figueiredo de Oliveira; Lés Moderna e Lésbica Retrô, by Anita Costa Prado and Regi Munhoz; SobretudoZine, by Edgar Franco; Tchê #48, by Denilson Reis
Webcomic	O Capirotinho; Guilherme Infante	Anésia, by Will Leite; Cantinho do Caio, by Caio Oliveira; Cartumante, by Cecília Ramos; Cuscuz Surpresa, by Helô D'Angelo and Daniel Cesart; Homem-Grilo, by Cadu Simões and Fred Hildebrand; Memória em Quadrinhos, by Toni Rodrigues; Pillow Talks, by Sasyk; Sonhando com Coragem, by Giulia Crovador; Um Quadrinhos Pra Falar de Vulvodínia, by Lari Macedo
Artist	Jefferson Costa; Quando Nasce a Autoestima?	Al Stefano (As Aventuras do Homem-Chiclete); André Freitas (META: Depto. de Crimes Metalinguísticos volume 3); Bianca Pinheiro (O Menino de Ouro & A Caixa de Alcebias); Germana Viana (Orixás: Griô); Gio Guimarães (As Sereias de Haarlem); Laudo Ferreira (Labirintite); Luiza Lemos (Orixás: Griô); Mari Santtos (Aprendiz de Bruxa); Rodrigo Mazer (O Homem do Lado de Fora)
Writer	Triscila Oliveira; Quarto de Despejo	Alex Mir (Orixás: Griô); Daniel Esteves (Labirintite); Eliane Bonadio (Zuri); Felipe Pan (As Sereias de Haarlem); Ferréz (Carimbê: Uma História do Capão Pecado); Laudo Ferreira (O Homem do Lado de Fora); Milena Azevedo (Aprendiz de Bruxa); Pacha Urbano (Sociedade de Investigações do Oculto: O Caso do Churrasco na Laje); Regiane Braz (Quando Nasce a Autoestima?)
Artist/Writer	Thiago Souto; O Teatro Fantasma	Al Stefano (Em Cantos da Mata); Aline Zouvi (Pigmento); André Diniz (Muzinga); Camilo Solano (A Balada Para Passear); Germana Viana (Contatos Alienígenas); Helena Cunha (Não Sou Orlando); Orlandeli (Mais uma História para o Velho Smith); Verônica Berta (Marina: Expressão); Wander Antunes (O Silêncio e a Tempestade)
Colorist	Germana Viana; Orixás: Griô	Amanda Miranda (Braba: Antologia Brasileira de Quadrinhos); André Caliman (Era Uma Vez no Contestado); Janis Ierullo (Capa de Culpa); Jefferson Costa (Quando Nasce a Autoestima?); Mariane Gusmão (Coringa: O Mundo); Orlandeli (Mais uma História para o Velho Smith); Thais Leal (Monstros Não Dizem Adeus); Verônica Berta (Marina: Expressão); Wander Antunes (O Silêncio e a Tempestade)
Graphic Humor Artist	Laerte Coutinho	Aroeira; Bira Dantas; Caio Oliveira; Carol Ito; Fabiane Langona; Gilmar Machado; Nei Lima; Quinho Ravelli; Will Leite
Jayme Cortez Award	Benedita da Silva, author of Bill No. 24/2020, which gave rise to Law No. 14.996/2024 that "Recognizes the artistic expressions of political cartoon, caricature, editorial cartoon and graffiti as manifestations of Brazilian culture"	12th Festival Internacional de Quadrinhos (Prefeitura de Belo Horizonte); 8th Gibifest (Coletivo Alvoradense de Quadrinhos); 8th Top! Top!, convenção paraibana de quadrinhos (Manassés Filho); Arquivo Ota: Um Mergulho na Mente Mais Maluca da HQ Brasileira (Bruno Porto and Marcelo Martinez, organizadores / MMarte Editora); Associação de Pesquisadores em Arte Sequencial; Guia dos Quadrinhos (Edson Diogo); Letícia Ferreira (Gibiteca Balão); Prateleira de Quadrinhos, which ceased operations in June 2024, after eight years (Jonatas Varela); Quadrinistas Contra a Fome (Quadrinistas Uni-vos and Poc Con)
Special: Editor	Thiago Ferreira; Comix Zone!	Carlos Rodrigues (Editora Criativo); Cassius Medauar (Conrad Editora); Daniel Esteves (Zapata Edições); Francisco Ucha (Ucha Editorial); Raphael Fernandes (Editora Draco); Rodrigo Rosa (Figura Editora); Rogério de Campos (Veneta); Sandro Lobo (Brasa Editora); Sidney Gusman (MSP Estúdios)
Special: Specialized Journalist	Mariana Viana; Fora do Plástico	Daniela Capuzzi (Páginas Amarelas HQs); Érico Assis (Virapágina); Gabriela Borges (Mina de HQ); Heitor Pitombo (Mundo dos Super-Heróis); Patricia Visconti (O Barquinho Cultural); Paulo Floro (Revista O Grito!); Pedro Ferreira (Fora do Plástico); Ramon Vitral (Vitralizado); Télio Navega (O Globo)
Special: Podcaster or YouTuber	Alexandre Linck; Quadrinhos na Sarjeta	Alessandro Garcia (Ministério dos Quadrinhos); Cássio Witt (Milhas e Milhas Nerd); Fernanda Zomer (Por Dentro da Estória); Marcelo Naranjo (Confins do Universo); Presto Gaudio (Chapéu do Presto); Rapha Pinheiro (Canal do Rapha Pinheiro); Rômulo Leão (Além dos Quadrinhos); Sidney Gusman (Confins do Universo); Vinicius (2quadrinhos)
