= Comix Book Shop =

Brazilian comic book store

- Company type: Private
- Genre: Retail
- Founded: October 31, 1986
- Founders: Carlos Mann
- Headquarters: Rua da Consolação, 2685, São Paulo, Brazil
- Area served: Greater São Paulo (in-person) and Brazil (online)
- Products: Comics
- Owner: Camilo Rodrigues and Jorge Rodrigues
- Website: http://www.comix.com.br/

Comix Book Shop is a Brazilian comic book store founded October 31, 1986, by Carlos Mann.

== History ==
Carlos Mann worked for a few years at newsstands, until he decided to buy his own in 1986, at Alameda Lorena, in the Jardins neighborhood, in São Paulo. Looking for a differentiator, Carlos started working with an importer that offered a kind of "subscription" to imported comic books, guaranteeing the regularity of their distribution (at the time, it was practically impossible to get imported comics in Brazil). In a short time, there were 200 permanent customers who regularly purchased a large amount of magazines.

With the success, the store, already called Comix, started to sell collectible card game, which made the space full on Saturdays. As the space was relatively small for the growing number of customers, Mann moved the store to a two-story high street store on Alameda Jaú, in the same neighborhood. With around 40,000 national and foreign items, on the first floor are the main publications and various materials related to comics, such as films, collectible figures and toy arts. On the second floor are the old magazines, in a kind of second-hand bookstore. Comix still has a warehouse with over 1 million products.

Initially, Mann worked with his father, Camilo Rodrigues. In 1995, his brother, Camilo José, started working at the company and today manages the warehouse and publications. In 2000, another brother, Jorge Rodrigues, also started working at Comix. In 2008, Mann left the command of the store, which was managed by Jorge and his father. The following year, the store's revenue (including participation with its own booth in events such as the Book Fairs in Rio and São Paulo, FIQ, among others) was R$ 1.5 million.

In the 1990s and 2000s, Comix had a printed magazine, with the same name as the store, which featured articles on comic books, manga, films and anime, in addition to a catalog of products from the comic book store. The magazine was distributed free of charge in the store and by mail. It was published until issue 40 by the publisher Escala and, in 2003, was taken over by Opera Graphica, which was founded by Carlos Mann.

In 2001, the Comix Book Shop held the first edition of the Fest Comix festival, inspired by the holiday sales that the store did regularly. In this first edition, which took place on the street in front of the store, 200 people attended to buy with high discounts, participate in launches and meet artists and personalities, such as Álvaro de Moya, André Diniz, Eugenio Colonnese, Franco de Rosa, Fábio Zimbres, Lourenço Mutarelli, Marcatti and Wellington Srbek, among many others.

In March 2022, the comic book store moved from Alameda Jaú to Rua da Consolação, just one block away.

== Awards and honors ==
In 2003, Comix Book Shop was honored with the incentive medal of Prêmio Angelo Agostini as "Best Store" alongside the comic stores Banca Flávio, Itiban Comic Shop, Point HQ and Revistas & Cia.
