= Mary Cagnin =

Brazilian comic artist

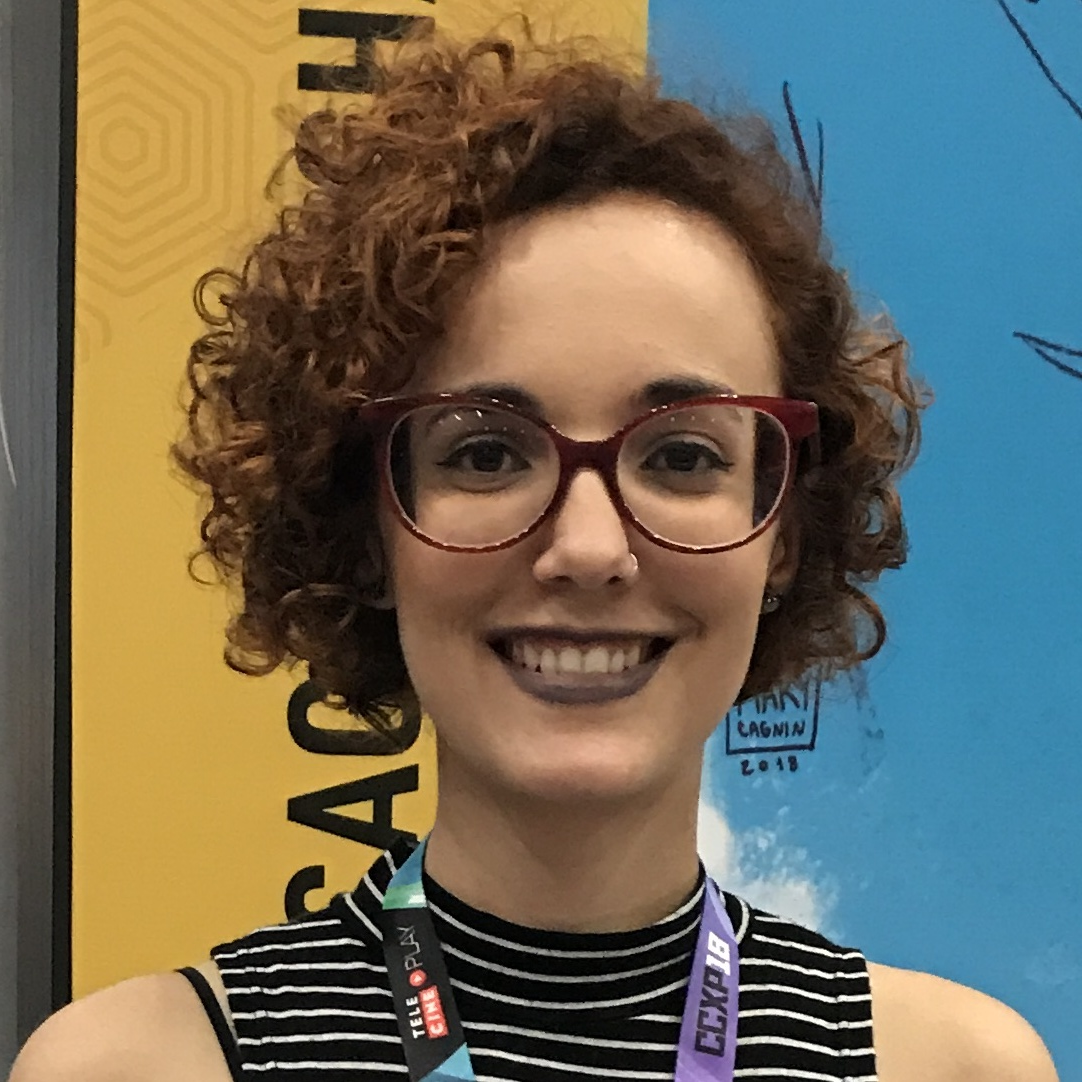
- Mary Cagnin in CCXP 2018.
- Born: 23 March 1990
- Works: Bittersweet, Black Silence
- Awards: Prêmio Angelo Agostini for Best Penciller (Black Silence, 2017); Prêmio Angelo Agostini for Best Writer (Bittersweet, 2021); Prêmio Angelo Agostini for Best Colorist (Bittersweet, 2020)
- Website: www.marycagnin.com

Mariana Cagnin, better known as Mary Cagnin, is a Brazilian comic artist.

== Biography ==
Having graduated in Visual Arts at Unesp, Cagnin currently works as an illustrator and cartoonist. In 2009 she started the manga-style series Vidas Imperfeitas in fanzine format; the sixth and final issue was released as a free PDF in 2012. The following year, the series was published by HQM Editora under the HQM Mangá label, in a total of 3 issues. In 2016, she launched the sci-fi story Black Silence, crowdfunding the project on the website Catarse. In 2017, she participated in the graphic novel A Samurai: Primeira Batalha, by Mylle Silva. She was awarded the Prêmio Angelo Agostini as illustrator and writer. Also in 2017, she was invited by the Brazilian Embassy to participate in the Gothenburg Book Fair. In 2019 she launched the webcomic Bittersweet, which was nominated for Troféu HQ Mix in 3 categories.

== Awards and nominations ==
Year	Award	Category	Work	Result	Ref
2017	Prêmio Angelo Agostini	Best Penciller	Black Silence	Won	
2017	Troféu HQ Mix	Best New Talent (Penciller)	Black Silence	Nominated	
2017	Troféu HQ Mix	Best New Talent (Writer)	Black Silence	Nominated	
2020	Prêmio Angelo Agostini	Best Colorist	Bittersweet	Won	
2020	Prêmio Angelo Agostini	Best Webcomic	Bittersweet	Nominated	
2020	Troféu HQ Mix	Best Colorist	Bittersweet	Nominated	
2020	Troféu HQ Mix	Best Pencille	Bittersweet	Nominated	
2021	Prêmio Angelo Agostini	Best Penciller	Bittersweet	Nominated	
2021	Prêmio Angelo Agostini	Best Writer	Bittersweet	Won	
2021	Prêmio Angelo Agostini	Best Independent Release	Bittersweet	Nominated	
