= André Vazzios =

Brazilian colorist, artist, and architect

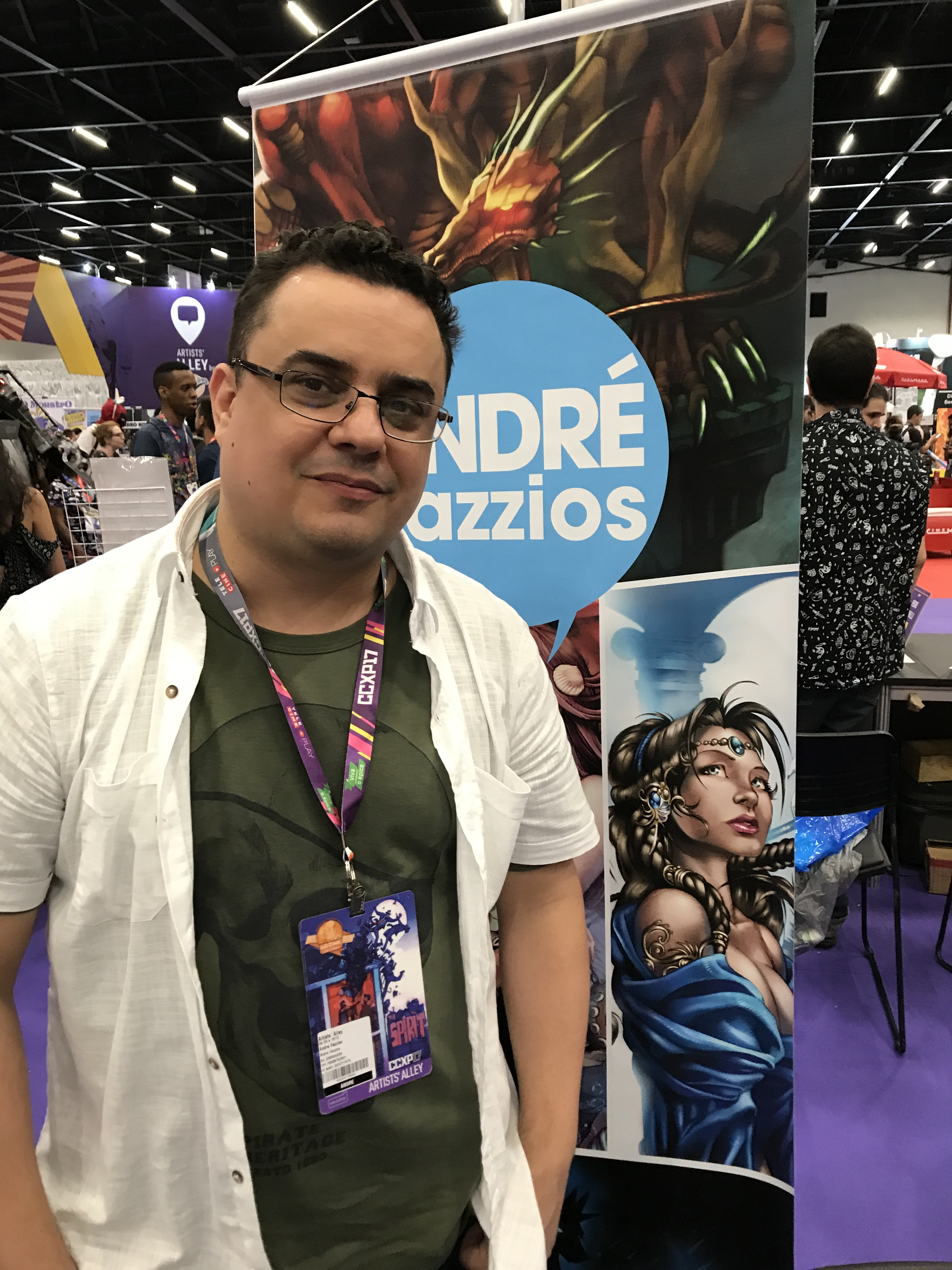
- André Vazzios in 2017 Comic Con Experience.
- Born: July 22, 1975; Santo André
- Occupation: Comics artist
- Works: Holy Avenger
- Awards: Troféu HQ Mix for best colorist (2002); Prêmio Angelo Agostini for Best Technical Art (2003); Prêmio Angelo Agostini for Best Technical Art (2004)

André Luiz da Silva Pereira, known as André Vazzios (Santo André, July 22, 1975) is a Brazilian colorist, comics artist and architect. He graduated in Architecture from Mackenzie Presbyterian University. He began his career as an illustrator in 1995 at Abril Jovem publishing house.

== Career ==
Vazzios gained prominence in the Brazilian comics market for his work as a colorist for comic books Holy Avenger and Lua dos Dragões, both part of the fictional universe of Tormenta RPG system. For these works, he won the Troféu HQ Mix in 2002 in the category "best colorist" and the Prêmio Angelo Agostini in 2003 and 2004 as "best art-technique" (award for colorists and letterers). He also won the Troféu HQ Mix in 1999 for "best national miniseries" by Lua dos Dragões.

Other works by Vazzios are the colors of the comic book Victory, covers of the Brazilian magazine Metal Pesado, illustrations of the role-playing game magazine Dragão Brasil and participation in the graphic novel MSP +50 - Mauricio de Sousa por Mais 50 artists.

In 2009, Vazzios published the independent graphic novel Uiara e os filhos do Eco. The book was produced with funding from the São Paulo State's Secretary of Culture and addressed ecological issues. The script was made by Vazzios and Jussara Nunes. He shared the pencils with Monique Novaes and Everton Teles Valério.

== Bibliography ==
There are related only the works of André Vazzios as writer and/or penciller.

- Lua dos Dragões (6 issues mini-series, written by Marcelo Cassaro, Trama Editorial, 1998-1999)
- Uiara e os filhos do Eco (independent, 2009)
- MSP +50 – Mauricio de Sousa por Mais 50 Artistas (many artists, Panini Brasil, 2010)
