= Itiban Comic Shop =

Brazilian comic shop

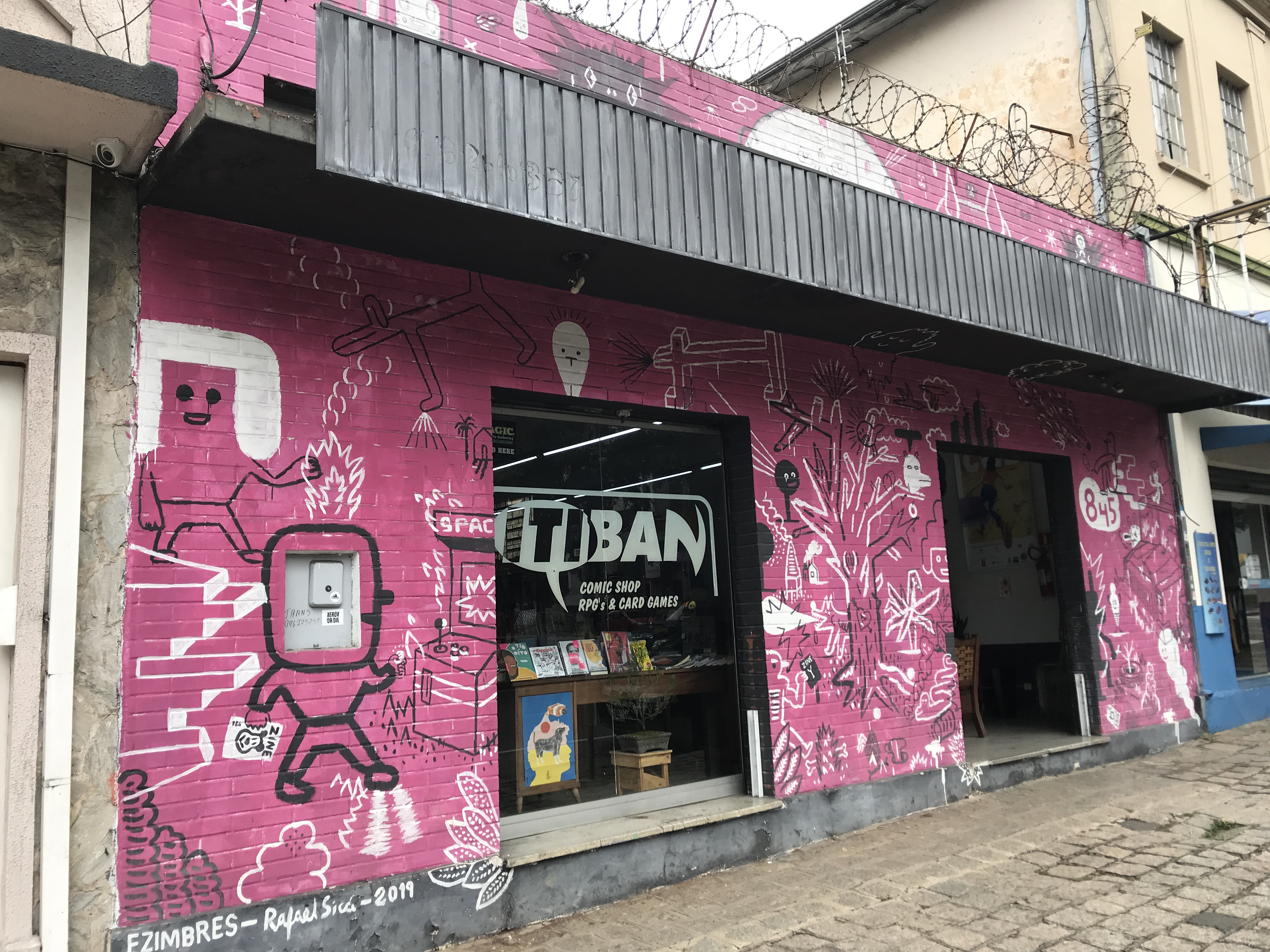
- Store's facade with graffiti by Brazilian comics artists Fábio Zimbres and Rafael Sica
- Company type: Private
- Genre: Retail
- Founded: 1989
- Founders: Mitie Taketani and Xico Utrabo
- Headquarters: Av. Silva Jardim, 845, Curitiba, Brazil
- Area served: Greater Curitiba (in-person) and Brazil (online)
- Products: Comics
- Owner: Mitie Taketani and Xico Utrabo
- Website: www.itibancomicshop.com.br

Itiban Comic Shop is a Brazilian comic book store founded in 1989 by the couple Mitie Taketani and Francisco Utrabo (better known as Xico Utrabo) in Curitiba. It was the first bookstore specializing in comics in the Brazilian South Region and one of the pioneers in Brazil. The name references the Japanese word "ichiban" (一番), meaning "number 1".

== History ==
In its early years, Itiban also sold newspapers and magazines due to the rules of the distributors. Over time, they managed to increase the amount of material related to comics, music and cinema. They also started to sell comics from the United States and the United Kingdom after an agreement with Devir Livraria, which acted as comic book's importer.

In all its years of operation, Itiban has held events related to comics and launches of works by various artists such as Lourenço Mutarelli, Bianca Pinheiro, Laerte Coutinho, Rafael Coutinho, Fábio Moon, Gabriel Bá and Marcello Quintanilha, among others. Some of its main activities are the regular chats with authors from all over Brazil, the ItiClub (its free monthly reading club) and the Itiban Jam Session (a live "drawing battle"). In addition, Mitie is also one of the curators of Bienal de Quadrinhos de Curitiba, which counts with Itiban as one of the supporters.

The store has already operated at three different addresses: Rua Visconde do Rio Branco, Avenida Marechal Floriano and Avenida Silva Jardim (current address, since 1999). The store's facade usually has graffiti by Brazilian comic artists, which are usually replaced without regularity. Currently, the facade features the art of Fábio Zimbres and Rafael Sica, who painted the store in honor of its 30th anniversary in 2019.

In 2021, Itiban went through a crisis due to a sharp drop in revenue as a result of the operating restrictions imposed by the COVID-19 pandemic, as its main clientele came from in-person sales, especially during the various events held in the store during the year. In March, Mitie made an appeal on social media, talking about the risk of the store closing after more than 30 years. The appeal mobilized customers and comic book fans from all over Brazil, increasing online sales (which were negligible until then), in addition to several messages of support.

== Awards and honors ==
Itiban Comic Shop was elected in 1998 as Best Comics Retailer by Troféu HQ Mix and, in 2003, it was honored with the incentive medal of Prêmio Angelo Agostini as "Best Store" alongside the comic stores Banca Flávio, Comix Book Shop, Point HQ and Revistas & Cia.
