= Bienal de Quadrinhos de Curitiba =

Bienal de Quadrinhos de Curitiba is a Brazilian comic book festival held since 2011 in Curitiba.

== History ==
In 2011, the event Gibicon nº 0 ("Gibi" is an informal way of calling comic books in Brazil) took place, with the subtitle "Curitiba's International Comics Convention", organized by Quadrinhofilia Produções Artísticas with Znort Ilustradores. They were invited by Curitiba's Cultural Foundation. There were several events, such as meetings, debates, lectures and exhibitions, held in different places in Curitiba (Gibiteca de Curitiba, Museum of Photography, Memorial de Curitiba, Goethe-Institut, Alliance française, Instituto Cervantes, Sesc Paço da Liberdade and Jokers Pub), with 32 Brazilian guests and seven international guests: Hervé Bourhis, Fabio Civitelli, Lucio Filippucci, Jens Hardes and Salvador Sanz. The event, which was made as a pilot project in anticipation of the 30th anniversary of Gibiteca (which would take place in 2012), had as main objective to assess the receptivity of the local public to this kind of event.

Gibicon reached about 10 thousand visitors in the "test" edition, so the event became regular from 2012 with Gibicon nº 1, this time effectively celebrating the 30th anniversary of Gibiteca de Curitiba. The event, whose periodicity was defined as a biennial for the subsequent editions, continued to be held in several locations around the city and increased the number of guests and related activities. The main activity was the exhibition Tesouros da Grafipar, in honor of Grafipar, a historic publishing house from Paraná.

In 2014, Gibicon nº 2 stopped being held in several places, concentrating its activities in the Municipal Museum of Art (MuMA). Exhibitions were held in honor of artists Solda (who also won the first edition of the Claudio Seto Award, started this year), David Lloyd, Kim Jung Gi, among others. This edition reached 20 thousand visitors and had more than 30 booths, in addition to several tables of independent artists.

With the end of the partnership between the event's organizers and Quadrinhofilia, which owned the name "Gibicon", the event was officially renamed the Bienal de Quadrinhos de Curitiba (Curitiba Comics Biennial) and had a mixed curatorship, formed by Mitie Taketani (owner of Itiban Comic Shop), by journalist Heitor Pitombo and by comic artists André Caliman, Lobo and Rafael Coutinho, in addition to consulting with Ibraim Roberson and Antônio Éder. With a project approved by the Rouanet Law, this edition received about 30 thousand people and brought as a novelty the availability of a space of 1,000 m^{2} in three areas of the event for the Comics Fair, a space destined for artists, publishers and exhibitors to present and sell comics and related works. In addition, the following year, Curitiba's Cultural Foundation made official the intention to intersperse the Bienal with the event Traços Curitibanos, which is focused only on local artists and whose first edition, in 2015, also took place at MuMA.

In 2018, the Bienal had as its theme "The city in comics" (with the proposal to discuss the relationship between the urban environment and the body in different cultures) and curated by Mitie Taketani and journalist and translator Érico Assis. With more than 300 exhibitors and more than 60 invited artists, the event received about 30 thousand people. One of the main highlights was the exhibition of works of visual arts by architect Key Imaguire Jr., produced since the 1970s but until then unknown to the public. The works were presented at the insistence of Mitie, who had met the production when she invited the architect to be honored at the event.

Due to the COVID-19 pandemic, the 2020 edition of the Bienal was postponed to the following year, but an online edition of the event was still held in August with similar characteristics to the in-person event, with exhibitions, lectures, workshops, chats and debates (all carried out with the support of the event's social networks and digital platforms such as Zoom). The event was curated once again by Mitie, this time with the comic artist Fabio Zimbres and with the special curatorship of the musician and producer Vadeco Schettin on account of the event's theme: "Comics & music: the relationship and the mutual influences of these two forms of artistic expression".

In 2021, however, with the maintenance of restrictions for face-to-face events in Curitiba, the sixth edition of the Bienal was online again, but this time during five months, from August to December. It had the same theme as the 2020 online edition, "Comics & Music". In addition to having 140 national and international artists invited, the event also brought the launch of an unprecedented collection with works by Luiz Gê, artist honored in the edition, an online comics fair, lectures, debates, workshops, co-creation of works and actions aimed at to the public of cities in the metropolitan region of Curitiba.

== Awards ==
In 2013, the then Gibicon received two of the most important Brazilian comics awards: the Jayme Cortez Trophy (which is part of Prêmio Angelo Agostini and aims to reward great contributions to Brazilian comics) and the Troféu HQ Mix for Best Event.

In 2020, the Bienal was again awarded at the Troféu HQ Mix, this time as Best Exhibition for "Angola Janga de Marcelo D'salette em Angola/Moçambique". The traveling exhibition was part of the "Brasil em Quadrinhos" project, a partnership between the Bienal and Itamaraty, and took the works of comics artist Marcelo D'Salete (especially the graphic novel Angola Janga) to Angola and Mozambique the previous year.

== Locations and dates ==
| No. | Date | Location | Notes |
|---|---|---|---|
| 0 | July 15–17, 2011 | Many places | |
| 1 | October 25–28, 2012 | Many places | |
| 2 | September 4–7, 2014 | MuMA | |
| 3 | September 8–11, 2016 | MuMA | |
| 4 | September 6–9, 2018 | MuMA | |
| 5 | August 20–23, 2020 | On-line | |
| 6 | August–December, 2021 | On-line | |

== Prêmio Claudio Seto ==
In 2014, Bienal de Quadrinhos de Curitiba started the Prêmio Claudio Seto (Claudio Seto Award), in honor of the comic artist of the same name. Artists are awarded for their body of work, receiving the Maria Erótica Trophy (a famous character by Claudio Seto) and winning exhibitions, lectures and debates on the life and work of those honored.

=== Winners ===
- 2014 - Solda
- 2016 - Benício
- 2018 - Key Imaguire
- 2020 - Luiz Gê
