= Festival Internacional de Quadrinhos =

Biennial comics festival in Belo Horizonte, Brazil

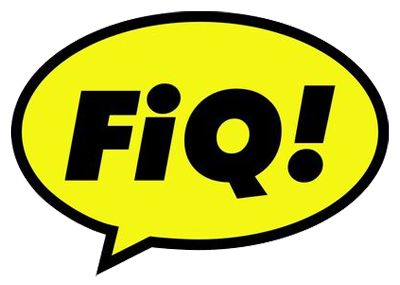
- Status: Active
- Genre: Comics
- Frequency: Biennial
- Locations: Belo Horizonte, Minas Gerais
- Country: Brazil
- Inaugurated: 1999
- Most recent: May 22–26, 2024
- Next event: November 4–8, 2026
- Organizer: Municipality of Belo Horizonte; Municipal Foundation for Culture
- Website: portalbelohorizonte.com.br/fiq

The Festival Internacional de Quadrinhos de Belo Horizonte, known as FIQ BH, is a comics festival held in Belo Horizonte, Minas Gerais, Brazil. Founded in 1999, it brings together a publications fair, exhibitions, discussions, workshops, launches, autograph sessions, and activities related to comics creation and the comics market. Municipal Law No. 11,059, enacted on July 17, 2017, established a biennial schedule for the festival under the Municipality of Belo Horizonte and its municipal cultural agency.

FIQ followed the International Comics Biennial, which was held in Rio de Janeiro in 1991 and 1993. The Biennial's third edition took place in Belo Horizonte in 1997 as part of the celebrations for the city's centennial. The first FIQ was held two years later.

== History ==
=== Background ===
The International Comics Biennial held its first two editions in Rio de Janeiro in 1991 and 1993. After a four-year hiatus, the Biennial moved to Belo Horizonte in 1997. Its third edition opened on October 16, with Serraria Souza Pinto as one of its main venues, and formed part of the city's centennial celebrations.

Following the 1997 event, the Municipality of Belo Horizonte created the Festival Internacional de Quadrinhos. Roberto Ribeiro of Casa 21 curated the first edition, and Casa 21 took part in creating the new festival.

=== 1st FIQ, 1999 ===
The first edition was held from December 1 to 5, 1999. Most activities took place at the Cultural Center of the Federal University of Minas Gerais, with exhibitions also held elsewhere in Belo Horizonte. Angeli was the honored artist and received a retrospective exhibition of original work. France was the country in focus, with exhibitions and appearances by French artists including François Boucq and Philippe Vuillemin.

Miguelanxo Prado, Mauricio de Sousa, Lourenço Mutarelli, and Laerte were among the participants. The program included discussions, exhibitions, workshops, and launches, and drew about 5,000 people.

=== 2nd FIQ, 2001 ===
The second FIQ was held from October 10 to 14, 2001, at Matriz in the JK Tourist Terminal on Olegário Maciel Avenue. The program included workshops, a comics fair, exhibitions, discussions, launches, films, and musical performances. Admission cost five reais and included a magazine.

Jô Oliveira was the honored artist and Argentina was the honored country. Foreign guests included José Muñoz, Carlos Nine, Jano, and Miguelanxo Prado. Brazilian participants included André Diniz, Marcello Gaú, Eloar Guazzelli, and other artists.

Launches included Mendelévio by João Marcos, the ninth issue of Graffitti, Saino a Percurá by Lélis, and a new edition of A Guerra do Reino Divino by Jô Oliveira. The audiovisual program screened the short films A Flor do Caos and Selenita Acusa! by Luiz Nazário.

=== 3rd FIQ, 2003 ===
The third edition was held from September 24 to 28, 2003, at Casa do Conde de Santa Marinha. Minas Gerais artist Mozart Couto was the honoree, created the festival poster, and received a retrospective exhibition of work dating from 1979.

Foreign guests included Sergio Toppi, Lorenzo Mattotti, David Lloyd, Kyle Baker, and Jacques de Loustal. Brazilian participants included Chantal, Angeli, Allan Sieber, Adão Iturrusgarai, Fábio Zimbres, and Ota. The edition also held the first Maratona de Quadrinhos, a program for students and educators in the municipal school system.

=== 4th FIQ, 2005 ===
The fourth edition ran from October 5 to 9, 2005, again at Casa do Conde. Lourenço Mutarelli was the main honoree and received an exhibition of 110 original works.

Collector Antônio Roque Gobbo, founder of the city's comics library, and cartoonist Lacarmélio Alfeo de Araújo, creator of Celton, received other tributes. The program also had a gathering of animators, role-playing game sessions, and portfolio reviews. Gary Panter, Gianfranco Manfredi, and Frédéric Boilet were among the foreign guests. Fábio Moon, Gabriel Bá, LOR, and João Marcos were among the Brazilian participants.

=== 5th FIQ, 2007 ===
The fifth edition was held from October 16 to 21, 2007, at Serraria Souza Pinto, which had also hosted activities during the 1997 Biennial. Japan was the country in focus. Programming devoted to Japanese comics included the exhibitions Nouvelle Mangá and Dreamland.

Julio Shimamoto was the honored artist and drew the poster for the edition. Foreign guests included Eduardo Risso, Domingos Mandrafina, Carlos Sampayo, Juan Sáenz Valiente, Pascal Rabaté, Benoît Sokal, Giancarlo Berardi, Eddie Berganza, and Kan Takahama. Roberto Ribeiro shared curatorial duties with Afonso Andrade.

=== 6th FIQ, 2009 ===
The sixth edition ran from October 6 to 12, 2009, with activities at Palácio das Artes and Américo Renné Giannetti Municipal Park. The festival was part of the France in Brazil Year, with France as the country in focus.

Renato Canini received an exhibition devoted to his work. Ciça Fittipaldi received another exhibition, and William Salvador, who died in 2008, was remembered by the organizers. Guests included Teresa Valero, Reinhard Kleist, Cizo, Liniers, Ben Templesmith, Becky Cloonan, Craig Thompson, Zhang Bin, and Guy Delisle. Attendance was estimated at 75,000.

The edition received the Troféu HQ Mix in the "Event" category the following year.

=== 7th FIQ, 2011 ===
The seventh edition was held from November 9 to 13, 2011, at Serraria Souza Pinto and drew 148,000 visitors. Mauricio de Sousa was the honoree. South Korea had a dedicated program, with appearances by Park Sang-sun and Cheon Kye-young.

Other foreign guests included Olivier Martin, Cyril Pedrosa, Kelly Sue DeConnick, Matt Fraction, Jill Thompson, Bill Sienkiewicz, and Horacio Altuna. Brazilian participants included Ana Luiza Koehler, Adriana Melo, Marilda Castanha, Ricardo Tokumoto, Jean Galvão, Vitor Cafaggi, Mateus Santolouco, Piero Bagnariol, Eloar Guazzelli, and Gualberto Costa.

The edition introduced an area of individual tables for independent artists, in a format similar to the artist alleys found at comics conventions. A special issue of Graffiti was created, printed, bound, and distributed inside Serraria Souza Pinto during the festival.

=== 8th FIQ, 2013 ===
The eighth edition ran from November 13 to 17, 2013, at Serraria Souza Pinto. Laerte Coutinho was the honoree and received a multimedia exhibition curated by Rafael Coutinho.

The edition introduced the Rodada de Negócios, a business matchmaking program organized with Sebrae. About 200 comics artists presented projects and portfolios to publishers and agents. Eduardo Risso, Salvador Sanz, George Pérez, Ivo Milazzo, and Jérémie Nsingi were among the foreign guests.

=== 9th FIQ, 2015 ===
The ninth edition was held from November 11 to 15, 2015, at Serraria Souza Pinto. Antônio Cedraz was the honoree. The festival hosted the "Leitura para todos" project by Marguerite Abouet and the Faísca graphic fair.

The independent artists' area grew from 34 tables in 2011 to 123. Foreign guests included Gail Simone, Jen Wang, Howard Chaykin, Amy Chu, Jeff Smith, Babs Tarr, Cameron Stewart, Birgit Weyhe, and Marguerite Abouet. Daniel Werneck and Ana Luiza Koehler were the curators.

=== 10th FIQ, 2018 ===
The tenth edition was initially planned for 2017 but was moved to the first half of 2018. It was held from May 30 to June 3 at Serraria Souza Pinto and the Youth Reference Center.

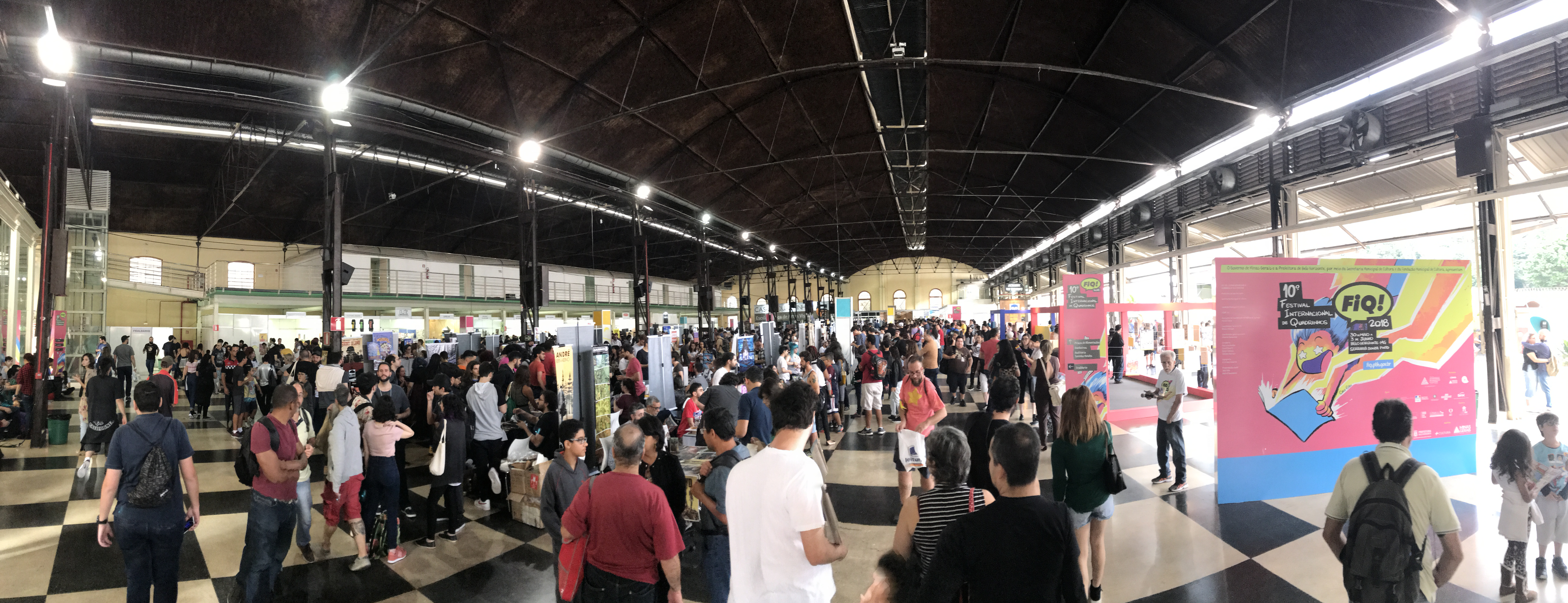
Panoramic view of the 10th FIQ at Serraria Souza Pinto in 2018

Érica Awano, artist of the series Holy Avenger, was the honoree. Foreign guests included Dave McKean, Anne-Charlotte Gauthier, Claudia Ahlering, Flore Balthazar, Mario Alberti, Zerocalcare, Troche, and Power Paola. Daniel Werneck, Ana Luiza Koehler, Fabiano Azevedo, and Carol Rossetti formed the curatorial team.

=== FIQ em Casa, 2020 ===
The 11th in-person edition was canceled in 2020 because of the COVID-19 pandemic. In its place, the organizers created FIQ em Casa, a special online program.

The program had 12 live conversations with comics artists, animators, and editors. Participants included Paulo Moreira, Aline Lemos, Carol Ito, Cristiano Seixas, Eduardo Damasceno, Germana Viana, André Dias, and editor Janaina de Luna. Audio from the interviews was released as podcasts. Seven videos with eight invited comics artists were posted on the festival's Instagram and IGTV accounts. Aline Lemos, Rebeca Prado, Vitor Cafaggi, and Erick Ricco curated the online edition, with Afonso Andrade and Gabriel Nascimento as coordinators.

=== 11th FIQ, 2022 ===
FIQ returned to an in-person format from August 3 to 7, 2022, at Minascentro, in partnership with Instituto Lumiar. Admission was free and the theme was "Comics and the world of work". Marcelo D'Salete was the honoree, and Amma and Lucas Ed. served as curators.

More than 40,000 people attended the event. The fair brought together 321 artists at 176 tables. The edition received the 2023 Troféu HQ Mix in the "Event" category.

=== 12th FIQ, 2024 ===
The 12th edition was held from May 22 to 26, 2024, at Minascentro, in partnership with Instituto Periférico. Its theme was "Where do comics fit?". Ana Luiza Koehler and Evandro Alves were the honored artists.

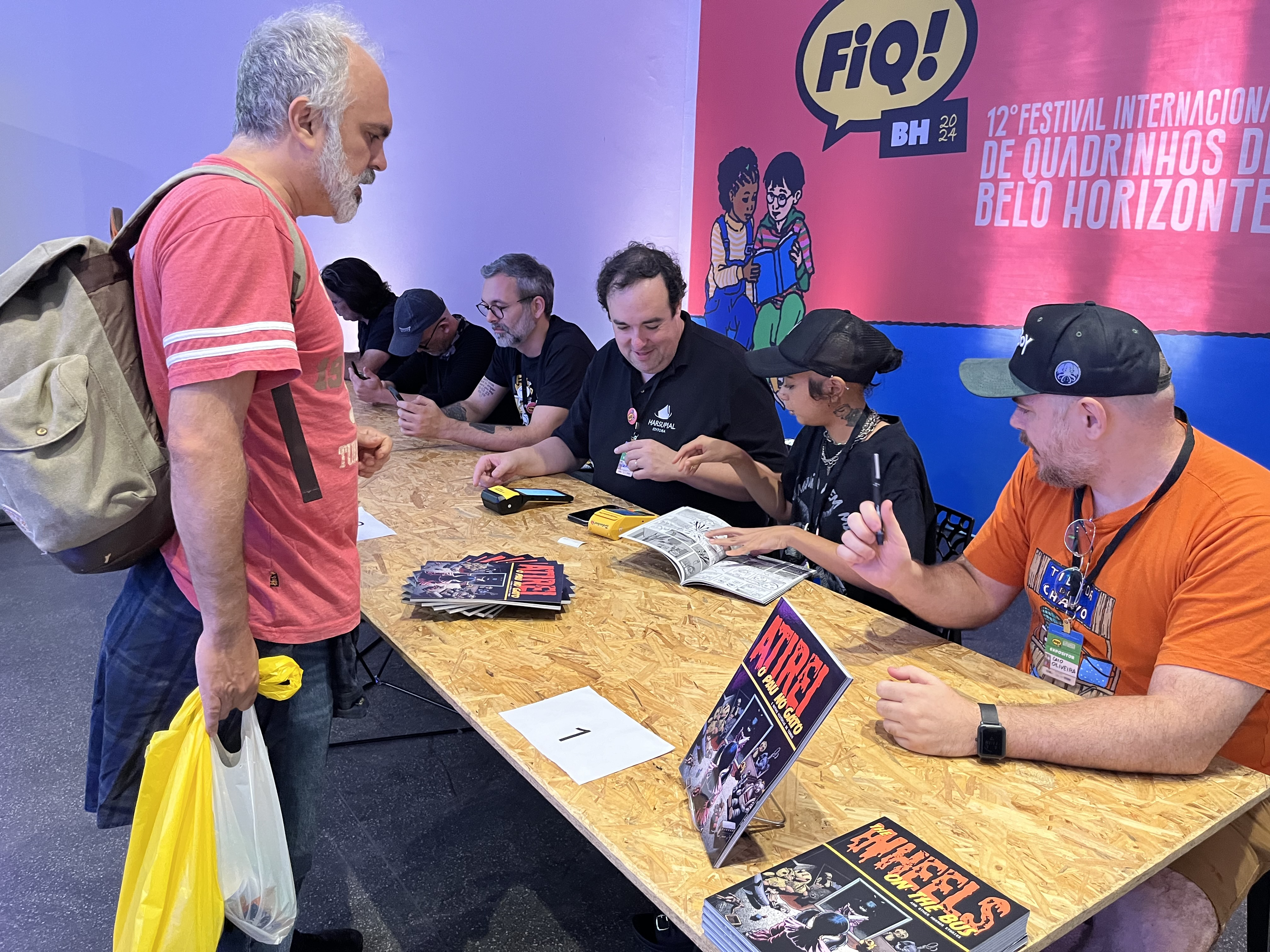
Autograph session during the 12th FIQ at Minascentro in 2024

More than 400 artists took part over the five days, and attendance was about 45,000. The festival had 266 artist tables and 93 guests from Brazil and other countries.

In December 2025, the edition received the 2025 Troféu HQ Mix in the "Event" category. It was FIQ's eighth win in the category, following awards in 2004, 2006, 2008, 2010, 2012, 2014, and 2023.

=== 13th FIQ, 2026 ===
On January 24, 2026, the Municipal Foundation for Culture published a public call to select a civil society organization to work on the 13th and 14th editions of FIQ. The selection process was approved in July 2026, and the collaboration agreement was signed that same month.

The 13th edition is scheduled for November 4 to 8, 2026, at Minascentro, in partnership with Instituto Periférico. Admission will be free, and the program is set to include discussions, talks, workshops, a comics fair, launches, film screenings, exhibitions, and business matchmaking sessions.

The same public call covers the 14th edition. The notice provides for pre-production in 2027 and the festival's return in May 2028.

== Dates and honorees ==
FIQ received the Troféu HQ Mix in the "Event" category in 2004, 2006, 2008, 2010, 2012, 2014, 2023, and 2025.

No.	Dates	Venue	Honoree	Country in focus	Troféu HQ Mix "Event"	Ref.
1	December 1–5, 1999	UFMG Cultural Center	Angeli	France	–	
2	October 10–14, 2001	Matriz, JK Tourist Terminal	Jô Oliveira	Argentina	–	
3	September 24–28, 2003	Casa do Conde	Mozart Couto	Italy	2004	
4	October 5–9, 2005	Casa do Conde	Lourenço Mutarelli	Spain	2006	
5	October 16–21, 2007	Serraria Souza Pinto	Julio Shimamoto	Japan	2008	
6	October 6–12, 2009	Palácio das Artes and Américo Renné Giannetti Municipal Park	Renato Canini	France	2010	
7	November 9–13, 2011	Serraria Souza Pinto	Mauricio de Sousa	South Korea	2012	
8	November 13–17, 2013	Serraria Souza Pinto	Laerte Coutinho	–	2014	
9	November 11–15, 2015	Serraria Souza Pinto	Antônio Cedraz	–	–	
10	May 30–June 3, 2018	Serraria Souza Pinto and Youth Reference Center	Érica Awano	–	–	
11	August 3–7, 2022	Minascentro	Marcelo D'Salete	–	2023	
12	May 22–26, 2024	Minascentro	Ana Luiza Koehler and Evandro Alves	–	2025	
13	November 4–8, 2026	Minascentro	–	–	–	

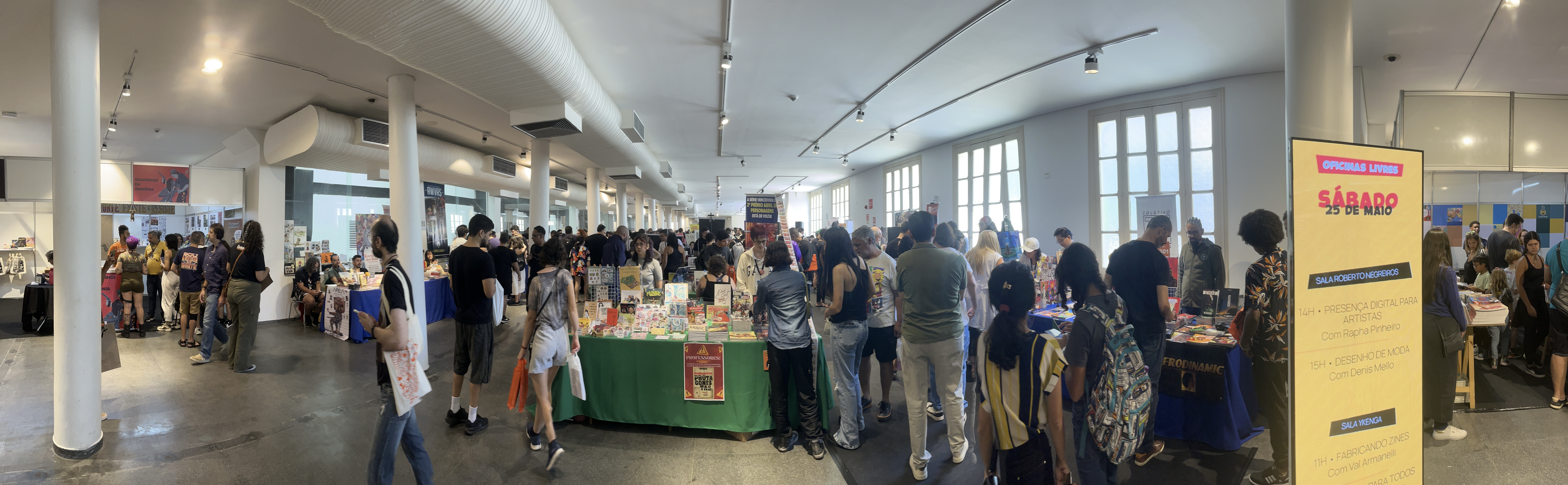
12th Festival Internacional de Quadrinhos in 2024

== See also ==
- International Comics Biennial, predecessor to FIQ
- Bienal de Quadrinhos de Curitiba, event formerly known as Gibicon
- Troféu HQ Mix Best Event, category won by FIQ eight times
