= Ju Loyola =

Brazilian cartoonist and illustrator

Juliana Loiola de Paula, also known as Ju Loyola, (born 1979) is a Brazilian cartoonist and illustrator. She is one of Brazil's first deaf female comic creators. Ju Loyola gained international recognition for her work on "silent manga", a manga genre where the lack of dialogue allows the work to be understood regardless of the reader's native language or level of literacy. Since 2015, she has been participating in the Silent Manga Audition, an international competition of the silent comic format.

== Early life ==
Ju Loyola was born in São Paulo in 1979. Her mother, Regina Mara Loiola de Paula, contracted the rubella virus while she was pregnant with Juliana, contributing to the artist being born deaf. She was diagnosed when she was 3 years old.

Ju Loyola became interested in illustration as a young child, at around 7 or 8 years old. Her early inspirations included Garfield by Jim Davis, Fido Dido by Joanna Ferrone and Sue Rose, and Strawberry Shortcake by Muriel Fahrion. She read such comics as Turma da Mônica by Mauricio de Sousa and The Phantom and Mandrake the Magician by Lee Falk. Later in life she became interested in Japanese anime and manga, including Saint Seiya and Sailor Moon. These works inspired her to pursue a career in comics.

Ju Loyola began her education in a traditional school. In 1991, she enrolled in a special school for the deaf, focused on teaching Brazilian Sign Language. She had trouble adapting and later returned to traditional schooling.

== Career ==
Ju Loyola first considered pursuing a career as a cartoonist during her teenage years, but at the time she believed that it was necessary to be fluent in spoken Portuguese to write dialogue for comics, so she put her dream on hold. Between 1998 and 1999, she worked as a denture technician, but felt unfulfilled and later abandoned her dental career.

In 2003, Ju Loyola graduated with a graphic design degree from the Pan-American School of Art and Design in São Paulo, and began working as a freelance cartoonist. Among her most notable freelance work during this period are contributions to the manga-style webcomic Combo Rangers in 2002. In 2007, she worked as an animator and collator for Lightstar Studios, including on the animated film Rio 2096: A Story of Love and Fury, which was directed by Luiz Bolognesi. However, she became increasingly interested in comics after attending the Festival Internacional de Quadrinhos and discovering silent manga, a dialogue-less comics format that tells stories without speech. She subsequently left her career as an animator to focus on comics.

An important aspect of Loyola's career is her participation in the Silent Manga Audition, an international competition in which she has received several honors, including an honorable mention and the 2016 SMAC! Editors Award.

While Loyola has said that her deafness no longer impedes her ability to create comics thanks to the silent comics medium, she still continues to experience prejudice and discrimination as a person with disabilities and a woman in the industry.

== Works ==
- Lost in the Forest (2015)
- The Witch Who Loved #1 (2015)
- The Charming (Love) Gift (2015)
- The Promise of Happiness (2016)
- Maria e Cia: Aventura das Estrelas (2016)
- Everybody Can Dance (2017)
- The Friend or Enemy?! (2017)
- The Witch Who Loved #2 (2018)
- The Imagination (2018)
- I’ll Be Back (2019)
- Heart of The True Friend (2019)

In 2019, she also contributed to the collections Shoujo Bomb and Gibi de Menininha #2.
