= Franco de Rosa (editor) =

Brazilian journalist, editor and comics artist

Franco de Rosa (born in São Paulo on January 2, 1956) is a Brazilian journalist, editor and comics artist. He started his career in 1974, with the comic strips Chucrutz and Capitão Caatinga, published in some Brazilian newspapers, such as Notícias Populares. From 1980, he started to make illustrations for newspapers and magazines. In 1984 he founded, alongside Paulo Paiva, the publishing house Maciota (also known as Press), which lasted until the 1990s. In 1997, he founded, alongside Dorival Vitor Lopes and Hélcio de Carvalho, the publishing house Mythos Editora. Rosa won the Troféu Jayme Cortez in 1990 and 1991, the Prêmio Angelo Agostini as best editor in 2003 and 2004 and as "Master of the National Comics" category in 2010.
