= Sidney Gusman =

Brazilian journalist

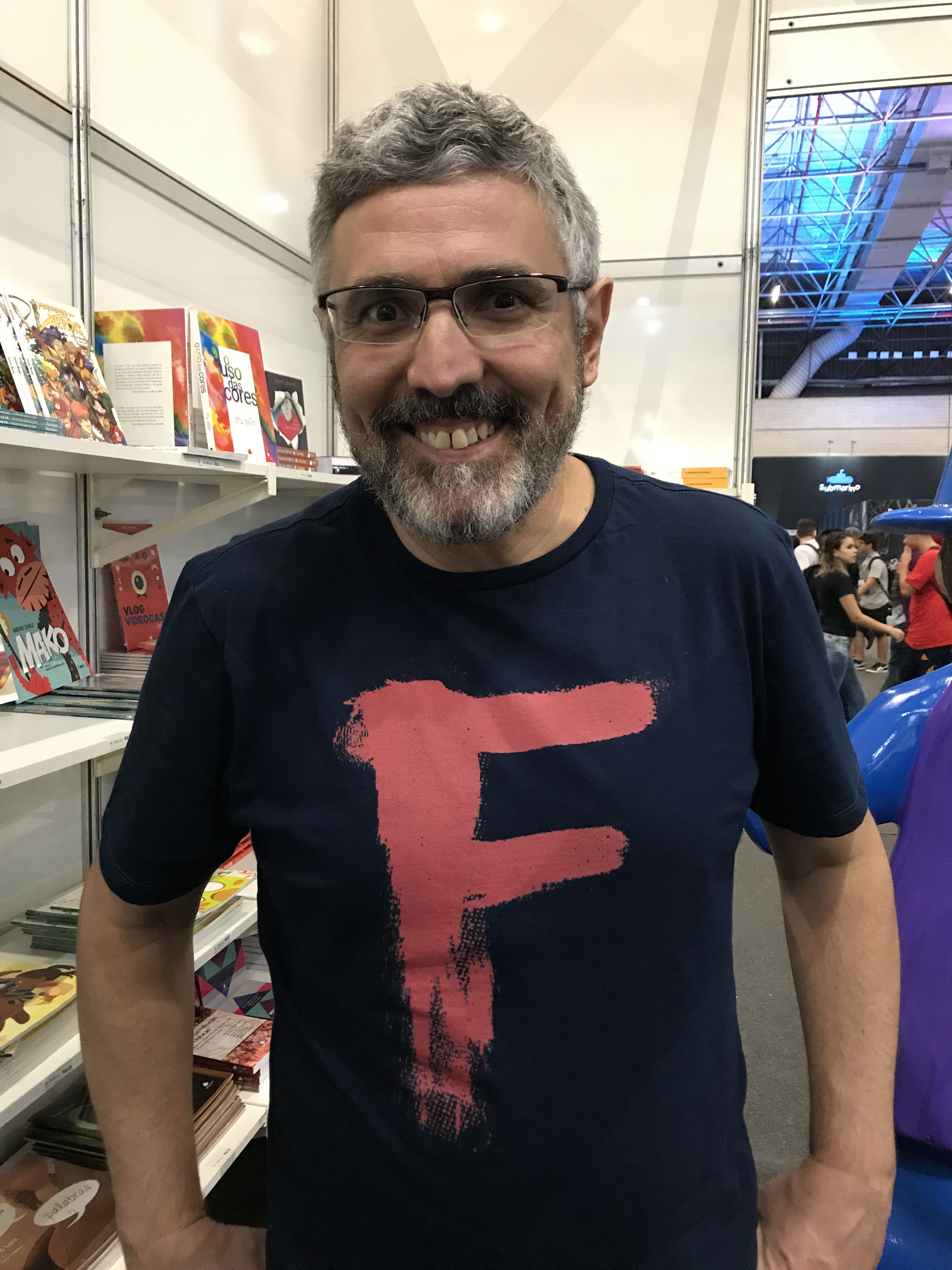
- Gusman in 2017
- Born: August 29, 1966 (age 59); São Paulo, Brazil
- Occupation: journalist

Sidney Gusman (born August 29, 1966) is a Brazilian journalist and editor. Gusman graduated in journalism at the Methodist University of São Paulo and started writing professionally about comics in 1990, with articles published in newspapers such as Folha de S.Paulo, O Estado de S. Paulo, among others, as well as magazines such as Imprensa, Superinteressante, Duas Rodas etc. Between 2003 and 2006 he was editor of the Brazilian version of Wizard magazine. In 2006, he became responsible for the Editorial Planning area of Mauricio de Sousa Produções, where, among several other projects, he was the creator of the Graphic MSP series, which since 2012 has published several graphic novels with reinterpretations of the classic characters created by Mauricio de Sousa by several Brazilian artists. He is also editor-in-chief of Universo HQ, the most important news portal about comics in Brazil. Gusman won the Troféu HQ Mix as best specialized journalist seven times (from 2001 to 2007). He also won the Troféu Jayme Cortez twice, in 2004 and 2014.
