= André Diniz =

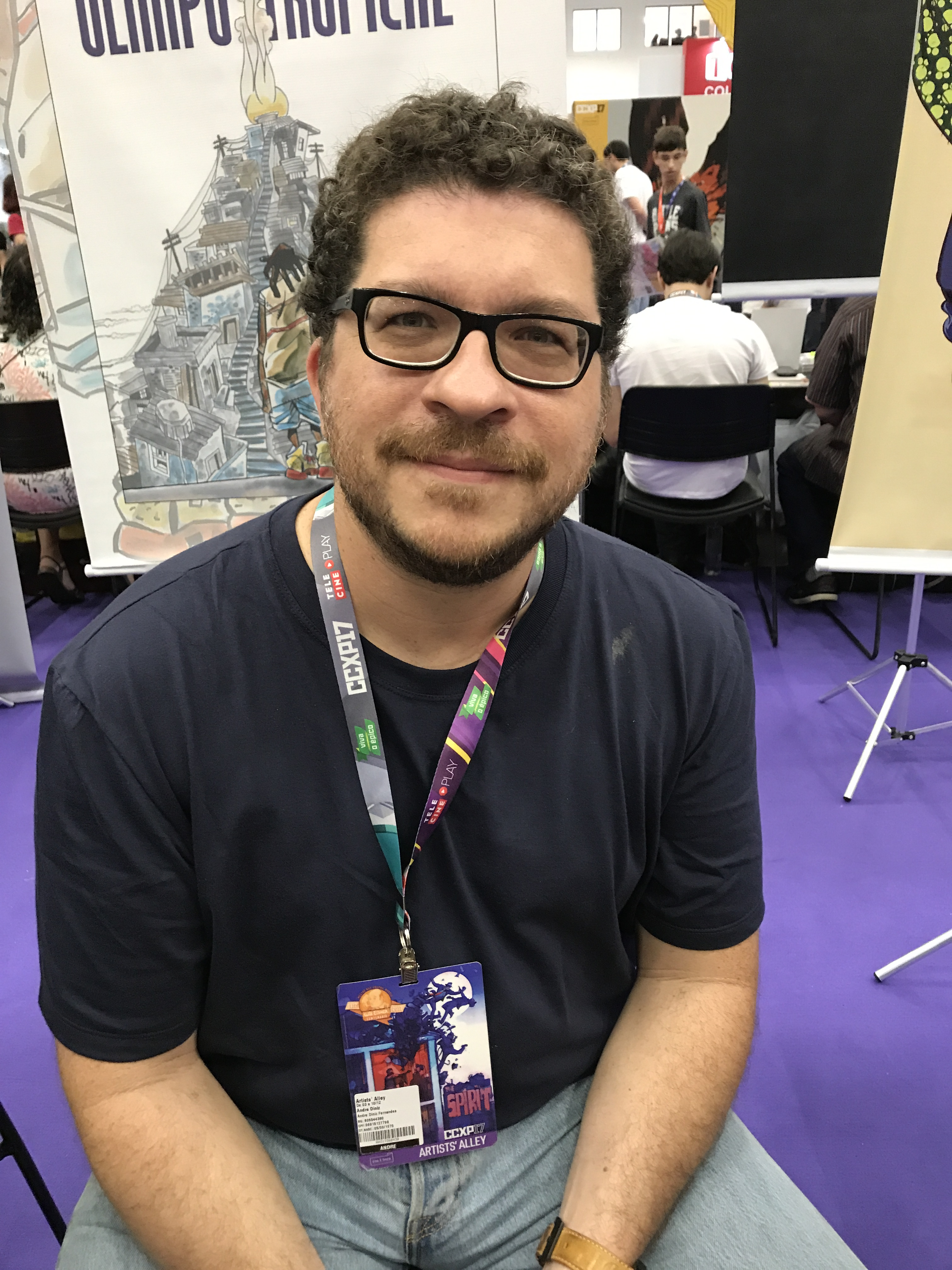
- André Diniz in 2017 Comic Con Experience.
- Born: 5 September 1975; Rio de Janeiro
- Occupation: Comics artist
- Works: 7 Vidas, Duas Luas, Fawcett, Picture a Favela
- Website: muzinga.net

André Diniz (Rio de Janeiro, September 5, 1975) is a Brazilian comics artist. He began working with comics in 1994 with the fanzine Grandes Enigmas da Humanidade, which had a circulation of 5,000 copies.

Diniz's first professional works were in 1997 and 1998, when he participated in two projects of Taquara Editorial: Tiririca em Quadrinhos and O Estranho Mundo de Zé do Caixão, respectively comics adaptations for the clown Tiririca and the movie character Coffin Joe, created by the filmmaker José Mojica Marins. In 1999, Diniz released his first independent comic: Subversivos, about the armed struggle against the Brazilian military dictatorship.

In 2000, Diniz created the publishing house Nona Arte, initially destined to publish his own works, but that later began to publish books of other independent Brazilian artists. The first graphic novels released by Nona Arte were Fawcett (inspired in Percy Fawcett, pencils by Flavio Colin) and Subversivos - Companheiro Germano (pencils by Laudo Ferreira Jr.). Both books had scripts by Diniz. In 2001, Fawcett won Troféu HQ Mix and Prêmio Angelo Agostini, respectively in the categories "best national graphic novel" and "best new release".

Nona Arte provided its comics in digital format through PDF files free of charge, even those that were sold printed. Between 2000 and 2005, when the publisher was closed, there were over 80,000 downloads of various comics. The publishing house won the Troféu HQ Mix, the most important Brazilian comic book award, in the category "best comics' website" from 2002 to 2006 and in the category "publisher of the year" in 2003, dividing the award with Panini Brasil.

Between 2002 and 2004, Diniz and the artist Antonio Eder published the fanzine Informal, which featured short comics by several independent artists. In 2003, the fanzine won the Troféu HQ Mix in the category "best fanzine". Other prizes won by Diniz were: Troféu HQ Mix for best writer in 2004, 2010 and 2012; Troféu HQ Mix for international highlight (that awards Brazilian artists who had his works published internationally) in 2013, 2014 and 2015; Prêmio Angelo Agostini for best writer in 2001; and Jayme Cortez Trophy (that awards great contributions to Brazilian comics) in 2004.

One of André's most prominent works is the graphic novel Morro da Favela, which tells the story of Brazilian photographer Maurício Hora, who was born and raised in Morro da Providência the first favela of Rio de Janeiro. This graphic novel won the 2012 Troféu HQ Mix as "best national special edition" and was also published in Portugal, the United Kingdom (as "Picture a Favela") and France (with the name Photo de la Favela). In 2017 and 2018, André published, respectively, the graphic novel Olimpo Tropical (with Laudo Ferreira Jr.) and a comic adaptation for The Idiot, from Fyodor Dostoevsky, both published in Brazil and Portugal.

== Bibliography ==
- Subversivos (independent, 1999)
- Subversivos - Companheiro Germano (pencils by Laudo Ferreira Jr., inks by Omar Viñole, Nona Arte, 2000)
- Fawcett (pencils by Flavio Colin, Nona Arte, 2000)
- Subversivos - A Farsa (pencils by Marcos Paz, Nona Arte, 2001)
- 31 de Fevereiro (Nona Arte, 2001)
- A Classe Média Agradece (Nona Arte, 2003)
- Chalaça, o Amigo do Rei (pencils by Antonio Eder, Conrad Editora, 2005)
- Ponha-se na Rua (pencils by Tiburcio, Franco Editora, 2006)
- Chico Rei (Franco Editora, 2006)
- Collections História do Brasil em Quadrinhos, História Geral em Quadrinhos and Filosofia em Quadrinhos (12 volumes) (2008)
- 7 Vidas (pencils by Antonio Eder, Conrad Editora, 2009)
- Ato 5 (pencils by José Aguiar, independent, 2009)
- O Quilombo Orum Aiê (Galera Record, 2010)
- MSP +50 – Mauricio de Sousa por Mais 50 Artistas (many artists, Panini Brasil, 2010)
- Morro da Favela (Leya Brasil/Barba Negra, 2011)
- A Cachoeira de Paulo Afonso (Pallas, 2011)
- O Negrinho do Pastoreio (Ygarapé, 2012)
- Z de Zelito (Desiderata, 2013)
- Homem de Neanderthal (Desiderata, 2013)
- Duas Luas (pencils by Pablo Mayer, Giz Editora, 2013)
- Que Deus Te Abandone (pencils by Tainan Rocha, SESI-SP Editora, 2015)
- Quando a Noite Fecha os Olhos (pencils by Mario Cau, independent, 2015)
- Mako (Marsupial Editora/Jupati Books, 2016)
- Olimpo Tropical (pencils by Laudo Ferreira Jr., Marsupial Editora/Jupati Books, 2017)
- Matei Meu Pai e Foi Estranho (Marsupial Editora/Jupati Books, 2017)
- O Idiota (Companhia das Letras, 2018)
