= Germana Viana =

Brazilian comic book artist and writer (born 1972)

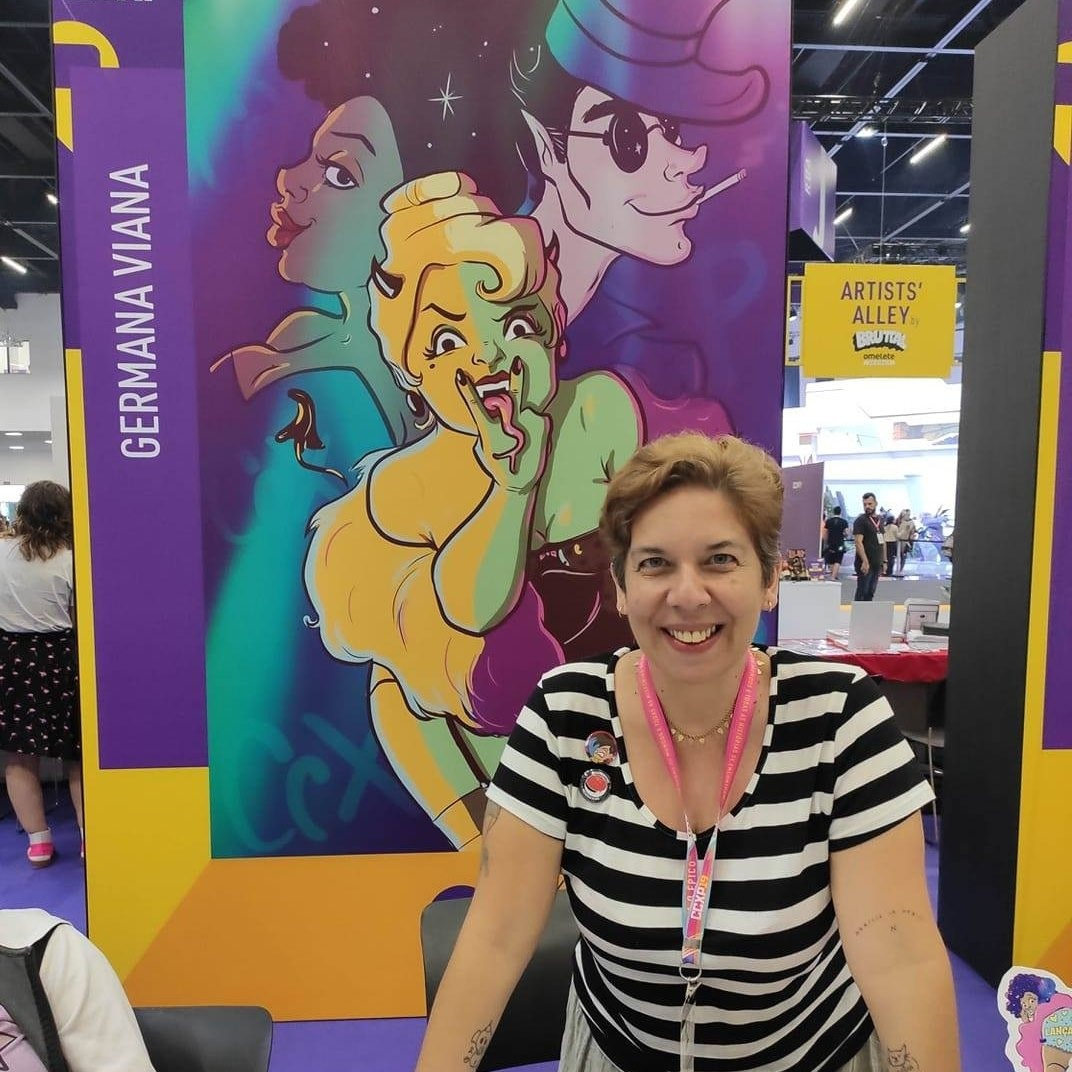
- Germana Viana at Comic Con Experience 2019
- Born: October 16, 1972 (age 53); Recife, Brazil
- Education: Universidade Estadual Paulista
- Occupations: comic book artist, comic book writer, illustrator

Germana Viana (born October 16, 1972) is a Brazilian comic book artist and writer.

== Biography ==
Born in Recife on October 16, 1972, Viana graduated in Arts from the São Paulo State University and began her career in the 1990s illustrating children's books. Since the early 2000s, she started acting as a graphic designer and comics letterer, having been assistant to Joe Prado in agencing Brazilian artists for the North American market.

From 2013 she started publishing her own comic books, starting with the Lizzie Bordello e as Piratas do Espaço (Lizzie Bordello and the Space Pirates) series, which was released in two volumes, respectively in 2014 and 2016, by the Jambô publishing house.

As of March 8, 2016, she started publishing the webcomic As Empoderadas, which won the 29th HQ Mix Trophy in the "best web comic" category. Viana also edited and was one of the authors of the anthology series Gibi de Menininha (2018), which also won the Troféu HQ Mix and the Troféu Angelo Agostini.In August 2020, alongside Laudo Ferreira and Marcatti, she launched the crowdfunding campaign for the comic Ménage on the website Catarse.

She is married to writer and editor Rogério Saladino.
