= Laudo Ferreira =

Brazilian comics artist

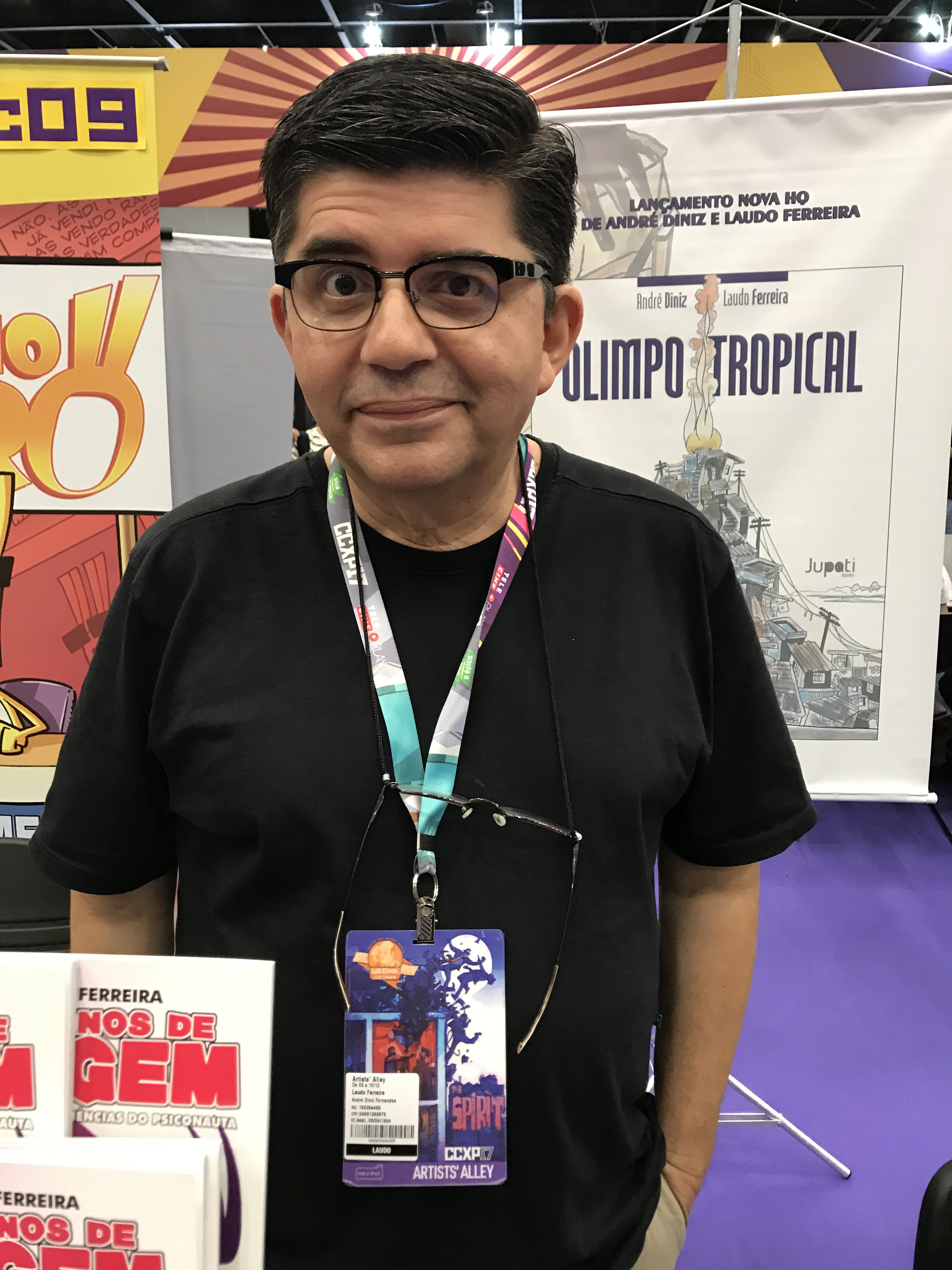
- Areas: Cartoonist, Writer, Penciller
- Notable works: comic adaptations of José Mojica Marins's Coffin Joe movies
- Awards: Troféu HQ Mix (1995, 2008, 2014, 2015 and 2016); Troféu Angelo Agostini (2008, 2009, 2010, 2015)

Laudo Ferreira (also known as Laudo Ferreira Jr.) is a Brazilian comics artist.

He began his career in 1983, illustrating for several publishers, as well as working with Advertising and the development of scenarios and costumes for theater. He won the Troféu HQ Mix (most important Brazilian comic related award) in 1995, 2008, 2014, 2015 and 2016. He created the comic adaptations of José Mojica Marins's Coffin Joe movies (At Midnight I'll Take Your Soul and This Night I'll Possess Your Corpse) and several other graphic novels, like Olimpo Tropical (published in Brazil and Portugal) and Yeshuah (an award-winning comic series retelling the life of Jesus based on Bible, apocryphal texts and historical information).
