= Troféu HQ Mix =

- Awarded for: Best Brazilian comics
- Country: Brazil
- Presented by: João Gualberto Costa and José Alberto Lovetro
- First award: 1989
- Website: http://www.hqmix.com.br

Troféu HQ Mix is a Brazilian comics award. The prize was created in 1989 by João Gualberto Costa (Gual) and José Alberto Lovetro (Jal), members of the Association of the Brazilian Cartoonists.

The name refers to the television show about comics that Gual and Jal had in the 1980s: "HQ" is abbreviation of "História em Quadrinhos" ("Comics" in Brazilian Portuguese) and "Mix" comes from the name of the show ("TV Mix 4").

The design of the trophy changes every year, always paying tribute to a character from Brazilian comics. The votes are made by artists and professionals of the area, editors, researchers and journalists.

== Categories ==
=== Current (2017) ===
- Best Adventure/Horror/Fantasy Publication (2009–present) - this category was merged from "Best Adventure Album", "Best Adventure Comic Book", "Best Adventure and Fiction Comic Book", "Best Fiction Album", "Best Fiction, Adventure and Horror Album", "Best Horror Album", "Best Horror Comic Book" and "Best Horror Publication"; and, until 2015, this category was called "Best Adventure/Horror/Fiction Publication"
- Best Children's Publication (2008–present) - this category was merged from "Best Children's Album" and "Best Children's Comic Book"; and, between 2009 and 2015, this category was called "Best Child and Youth Publication"
- Best Classic Publication (2004–present) - this category was merged from "Best Classic Album" and "Best Classic Comic Book"
- Best Colorist (1999–present) - in 2016, this category was called "Best Colorist/Inker" and awarded a colorist
- Best Comics Adaptation (2009–present)
- Best Comic Strips Publication (2004–present)
- Best Doctoral Thesis (2007–present)
- Best Editorial Project (1997–present)
- Best Event (2004–present)
- Best Exhibition (1989–present)
- Best Foreign Special Edition (2004–present)
- Best Graduation Academic Work (2007–present)
- Best Humor Publication (2004–present) - this category was merged from "Best Humor Album" and "Best Humor Comic Book"
- Best Independent Group Publication (2008–present)
- Best Independent Single Edition Publication (2008–present) - until 2010, this category was called "Best Independent Special Publication"
- Best Independent Sole Publication (2008–present)
- Best Inker (2017–present)
- Best Masters Dissertation (2007–present)
- Best Miniseries Publication (2004–present) - this category was merged from "Best National Miniseries" and "Best Foreign Miniseries"; and, until 2016, this category was called "Best Miniseries"
- Best Mix Publication (1989–present) - until 2003, this category was called "Best Mix Comic Book"
- Best National Special Edition (2004–present)
- Best New Talent (Penciller) (1990–present) - until 2010, this category was called "Revelation Penciller"
- Best New Talent (Writer) (2007–present) - until 2010, this category was called "Revelation Writer"
- Best Penciller (1989–present)
- Best Production for Other Languages (1989–present) - this category was also called: "Best Adaptation to Another Vehicle" (1989-2010), "Best Production in Other Languages" (2011-2015) and "Best Adaptation to Another Language" (2016)
- Best Theoretical Book (1989–present)
- Best Webcomic (1998–present) - until 2007, this category was called "Best Comics' Website"
- Best Webcomic Strip (2012–present)
- Best Writer (1989–present)
- Best Youth Publication (2016–present)
- Great Contribution (1989–present)
- Great Homage (1992–present) - until 2015, this category was called "Special Homage"
- Great Master (1990–present)
- International Highlight (2010–present)
- Publisher of the year (1989–present)

=== Past awards ===
- Best Adaptation from TV to Comics (1989–1990)
- Best Adventure Album (1995; 1999–2008)
- Best Adventure Comic Book (1998; 2004–2008)
- Best Adventure and Fiction Comic Book (1989–1990; 1994; 1996; 1999–2003)
- Best Animated Cartoon (1995–1999)
- Best Animated Cartoon (Feature Film) (2000–2003)
- Best Animated Cartoon (Short Film) (2000–2002)
- Best Animated Cartoon for TV (2000–2003)
- Best Animation (2005–2008)
- Best Author's Website (2004–2008)
- Best Blog / Flog of Graphic Artist (2004–2008)
- Best Blog About Comics (2008)
- Best Caricatures Publication (1993–2011) - until 2003, this category was called "Best Caricatures Book"
- Best Caricaturist (1997–2012)
- Best Cartoonist (1997–2012)
- Best Cartoons Publication (1993–2011) - until 2003, this category was called "Best Cartoons Book"
- Best Children's Album (1989–2007)
- Best Children's Book (1997–2002)
- Best Children's Book Illustrator (2004–2008)
- Best Children's Comic Book (1989–2007)
- Best Classic Album (1989–2003)
- Best Classic Comic Book (1989–2003)
- Best Columnist (1989–2010) - until 2007, this category was called "Best Specialized Journalist"
- Best Comic Store (1989–2000)
- Best Editor (1989–1990)
- Best Editorial Cartoonist (1997–2012)
- Best Editorial Cartoons Publication (1993–2011) - until 2003, this category was called "Best Editorial Cartoons Book"
- Best Erotic Publication (1989–2016) - until 2001, this category was called "Best Erotic Album"
- Best Fanzine (1990–2007)
- Best Fiction Album (1989–1990; 1995; 1999–2003)
- Best Fiction, Adventure and Horror Album (1991–1992; 1994; 1996–1998)
- Best Foreign Comic Strip (1989–2003)
- Best Foreign Graphic Novel (1989–2003)
- Best Foreign Miniseries (1989–2003)
- Best Foreign Penciller (1989–2015)
- Best Foreign Writer (1989–2015)
- Best Graphic Finishing (1989–1990)
- Best Graphic Humor Artist (2013–2015)
- Best Graphic Humor Publication (2012–2016) - this category was merged from " Best Caricatures Publication", "Best Cartoons Publication" and "Best Editorial Cartoons Publication"
- Best Graphic Project (1989–2008)
- Best Horror Album (1989–1990; 2011–2003)
- Best Horror Comic Book (1990–1996; 1998–2000; 2003)
- Best Horror Publication (2004–2008)
- Best Humor Album (1989–2003)
- Best Humor Comic Book (1989–2003)
- Best Illustration Book (2000–2001)
- Best Illustrator (1997–2010)
- Best Independent Publication (1989–2007) - until 2003, this category was called "Best Independent Comic Book"; and, from 2008, this category was split into "Best Independent Group Publication", "Best Independent Pocket Publication", "Best Independent Single Edition Publication" and "Best Independent Sole Publication"
- Best Independent Pocket Publication (2008)
- Best Letterer (1999)
- Best Licensing Character (1998–2000)
- Best Licensing Company (1998–2001)
- Best Licensing Product (1998–2001)
- Best Media About Comics (2009–2012) - this category was merged from "Best Blog About Comics", "Best Publication About Comics" and "Best Website About Comics"
- Best National Comic Strip (1989–2015)
- Best National Graphic Novel (1992–2003)
- Best National Miniseries (1999–2002)
- Best New Project (1998)
- Best Newspaper Supplement for Children (1989–1990)
- Best Prozine (2005–2007)
- Best Publication About Comics (1997–2008) - until 2003, this category was called "Best Magazine About Comics"
- Best Research (1989–2006) - from 2007 this category was split into "Best Doctoral Thesis", "Best Graduation Academic Work" and "Best Masters Dissertation"
- Best Salon and Festival (2000–2014)
- Best Serial Comic Book (1992–2003)
- Best Special Edition (1989–2003) - from 2014, this category was split into National and Foreign Special Editions
- Best Sticker Album (1996–2003)
- Best Toy (1998–2001)
- Best Video Game (1999)
- Best Website About Comics (1999–2008)
- Best Western Comic Book (1989)
- Comic Book Fan - Personality (2013)
- Featured Character (1989–2003)
- Largest Print Run (1989–1990)
- Latin American Highlight (2011–2014)
- Portuguese Language Highlight (2013–2014)
- Special Manga (2016)
- Valorization of Comics (1989–2006)
