= Troféu Angelo Agostini =

Trofeu Angelo Agostini
- Awarded for: Brazilian comics
- Sponsored by: AQC-ESP
- Location: São Paulo
- Country: Brazil
- Presented by: Associação dos Quadrinhistas e Caricaturistas do Estado de São Paulo
- First award: 1985
- Website: http://trofeuangeloagostini.com.br/

Troféu Angelo Agostini (Angelo Agostini Trophy), sometimes also called Prêmio Angelo Agostini (Angelo Agostini Award), is the most traditional comics award in Brazil. It was created in 1985 by the Associação dos Quadrinhistas e Caricaturistas do Estado de São Paulo (AQC-ESP), which still organizes the event today.

The award's name pays homage to Angelo Agostini, considered at the time the pioneer artist of Brazilian comics. The event also seeks to take place, whenever possible, on Dia do Quadrinho Nacional ("National Comics Day", in January 30), the same date in which, in 1869, the first episode of the Agostini's sequential art series As Aventuras de Nhô Quim ou Impressões de Uma Viagem à Corte was published.

== History ==
=== 1980s ===
The first edition of Prêmio Angelo Agostini was held on January 30, 1985 and had only the Master of National Comics category. The four honorees of this first edition (artists who have been dedicating themselves to Brazilian comics for at least 25 years) were chosen by the AQC-ESP board and received as a trophy a plate in cliché of the first episode of Nhô Quim.

The following year, three new categories were added: "Best Penciller", "Best Writer" and "Best New Release". In addition, the choice of winners was made by open vote for members of AQC-ESP and comics artists associations from other states.

In 1987, a special trophy was awarded to the Union of Journalists of São Paulo for supporting the struggles of comics artists. The following year, this trophy was officially renamed Jayme Cortez Trophy, in honor of the artist of the same name who died the previous year. The purpose of this category is to honor a person or institution that has supported the national comics in the year prior to the award ceremony. The same year, the trophy design was changed to a small glass statue with an Angelo Agostini image.

=== 1990s ===
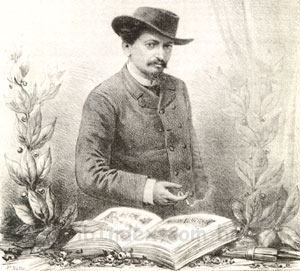
Self-portrait of Angelo Agostini, the artist who names the award and who posthumously received the title of Master of the National Comics in 2004.

To increasing the number of people voting, the ballot with the categories was distributed in fanzines and could be sent by mail to AQC-ESP headquarter. Anyone interested, whether professional or just a comics reader, could vote for any artist or work that met the criteria for each category.

In 1993, the trophy given to the winners became a bronze plaque with the AQC-ESP "mascot" parrot, designed by Rodrigo Leão and produced by the company Inarco. In the same year, the category "Best Fanzine" was created, to award fanzines that bring information, news, reviews or notes about comics (independent comic books remained being voted in the category of "Best Release").

From 1994, Angelo Agostini's trophies ceremony also included the Nova award, from the Brazilian Society of Fantastic Art (SBAF), which had begun awarding the best science fiction comics the previous year. However, this happened only to the categories linked to comics, as the others remained in the SBAF's own event.

For the award's 1995 edition, there was a change in the ballot. From then on, each person could choose up to two names, which would have different "weight" if placed in first or second (with the exception of the category "Master of National Comics", which awards three people and, therefore, had space for three names with the same "weight"). The aim was to increase the number of names being voted on and decrease the chances of "combined" votes.

=== 2000s ===
The 18th edition, in 2002, exceptionally awarded 13 people as "Master of National Comics" instead of the traditional three names. This would be a tribute to the "majority" of the event (it was "turning 18 years old"). It was the largest number of winners in this category in the same edition.

The following year, Angelo Agostini took place together with the fifth edition of Fest Comix, a comics event held regularly by Comix Book Shop. Due to the greater space and audience, the Angelo Agostini's organizing committee decided to add four special categories: Best inker, best technical art (colorist and letterer), best editorial cartoonist and best editor. Each special category awarded five professionals. In addition, the organizing committee awarded an incentive medal to personalities and institutions linked to comics: friends of the national comics, classic publishers, current publishers, entities, schools and shopkeepers.

In 2004, once again the awards ceremony took place into Fest Comix. The four special categories included in the previous year were then maintained, but this time each awarding two professionals. From the following year, only the category of "Best Editorial Cartoonist" became regular. Also in 2005, the Hermes Tadeu Special Prize was awarded in honor of the artist of the same name, who was murdered on December 21, 2003 after suffering an attempted robbery. The award, for best colorist, was given by Tadeu's sister to Diogo Saito.

In 2006, votes could also be sent by e-mail, in addition to the possibility of sending the voting ballot by regular mail. The following year, an important change occurred in the "Master of National Comics" category: Only living artists became eligible for the award (until the previous year, the trophy was awarded posthumously several times). Due to this change, all deceased artists who were part of the list that AQC-ESP published annually of people eligible for the category (that is, who had dedicated themselves at least in the last 25 years to Brazilian comics) were automatically defined by the commission organizer as "Masters in memoriam".

=== 2010s ===
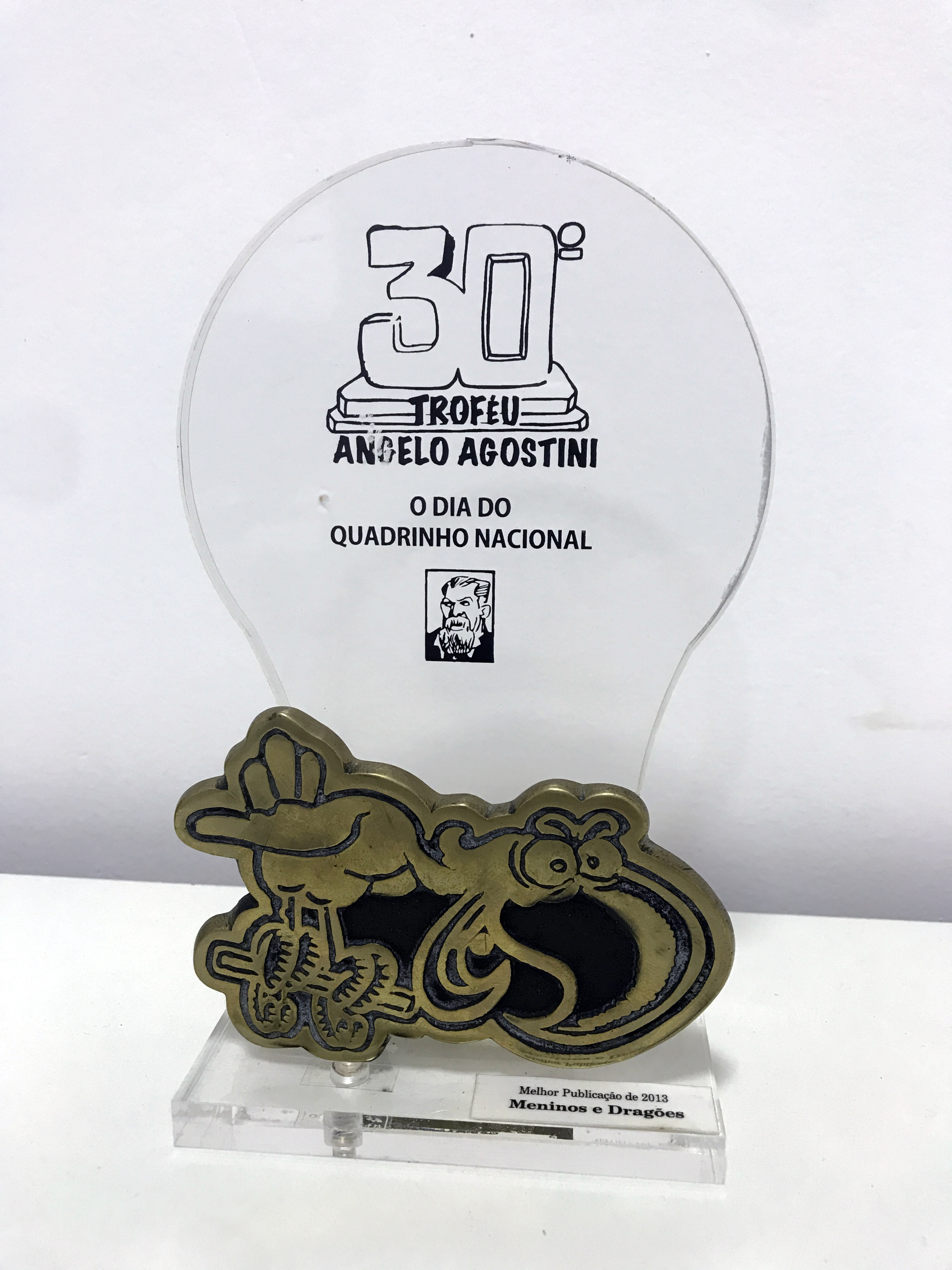
Trophy for the 30th Prêmio Angelo Agostini, with the AQC-ESP "mascot" parrot.

In 2011, there was created a new category: "Best Independent Release". The eligibility was the same of "Best Release" category (a publication by Brazilian artists whose first edition, special issue or single issue was released in the previous year), but it was exclusively aimed at comics published by the author himself or by small publishing houses with low circulation. Another category was created in 2015, "Best Webcomic", open to "virtual magazines or fanzines (available in PDF, CDR or similar format), internet pages, comic strip's or characters' blogs", being the main criterion that the publishing was exclusively virtual.

For the 2013 edition, the award's organizing committee changed the way they receive the votes, which are now made directly on the AQC-ESP's official blog, which was created in 2010. The list of eligible publications was also published directly on the blog. The main reflection of this change was in the number of votes: 14,937 (of which around 12,000 were considered valid by the electoral commission), against a total that hardly exceeded 500 in previous editions. As of the 2016 edition, AQC-ESP started to use the Google Forms system to increase security against double votes.

In 2015, AQC-ESP published an official statement apologizing for adding Francisco Iwerten in the 2007 list of "Masters of the National Comics in memoriam". Iwerten's existence had been a joke by the creators of the character O Gralha, a superhero who appeared in a 1997 album in honor of Gibiteca de Curitiba's 15 years. They said in the book that the character was inspired by Captão Gralha, a 1940s super-hero created by Iwerten (which, according to the authors, they believed would be clearly understood as a joke). However, over time, many people came to believe that the story was real, even though there was no other reference to this artist before the album's publication. The story was only "officially" disproved in the afterword of O Gralha's second album, released in September 2014. In the statement, the Angelo Agostini organizers apologized for not having done a deeper research on Iwerten real existence.

Since 2017, the category "Master of National Comics" was chosen by the organizing committee and no longer by voters. The only exception to this new criterion was in the 2019 edition (when that was chosen by open voting), but in the following edition the definition of the winners in this category was again made by the organizing committee.

In 2019, was created the "Best Colorist" category. Colorists had only been awarded in 2003 and 2004, within the "Best Technical Art" category (which also included letterers), and in 2005 with the Special Prize Hermes Tadeu (exclusive to them). In addition, the category "Best Editorial Cartoonist" was renamed "Best Editorial Cartoonist / Caricaturist", expanding its original scope.

The 2019 edition also brought the biggest change in voting: from this year, instead of the traditional open vote on any eligible person or work, the organizing committee started to present a list of ten nominees in each category, defined by a group of professionals specially invited for this task.

=== 2020s ===
Due to the COVID-19 pandemic, the awards ceremony for the 36th Prêmio Angelo Agostini, which was originally scheduled for June 2020 at the Latin America Memorial, has been suspended (as have most of the country's cultural activities). Because of this, the event organizers chose to wait for a new date to start voting, which only took place in January 2021. This problem reoccurred in the next edition, focused on the production of 2020 comics, but which had its vote postponed to early 2022. The schedule was regularized in 2022 with the 38th edition of the award being held in the second half of the year.

== Current categories ==
- Master of National Comics (since 1985)
- Penciller (since 1986)
- Writer (since 1986)
- Release (since 1986)
- Jayme Cortez Trophy (since 1987)
- Fanzine (since 1993)
- Editorial Cartoonist, Political Cartoonist and Caricaturist (since 2003)
- Independent Release (since 2011)
- Webcomic (since 2015)
- Colorist (since 2019)
- Release for Children (since 2020)
