= List of Troféu HQ Mix winners =

This article is a list of winners of Troféu HQ Mix, sorted by category.

== People ==
=== Best caricaturist ===
- 1997: Chico Caruso
- 1998: Osvaldo
- 1999: Cau Gomez
- 2000: Dalcio
- 2001: Loredano
- 2002: Baptistão
- 2003: Loredano
- 2004: Quinho
- 2005: Baptistão
- 2006: Baptistão
- 2007: Baptistão
- 2008: Baptistão
- 2009: Dalcio
- 2010: Fernandes
- 2011: Gustavo Duarte
- 2012: Gustavo Duarte

=== Best cartoonist ===
- 1997: Lage
- 1998: Santiago
- 1999: Santiago
- 2000: Santiago
- 2001: Spacca
- 2002: Laerte Coutinho
- 2003: Gilmar
- 2004: Laerte Coutinho
- 2005: Laerte Coutinho
- 2006: Spacca
- 2007: Laerte Coutinho
- 2008: Alan Sieber
- 2009: Duke
- 2010: Airon
- 2011: Alan Sieber
- 2012: Dálcio Machado

=== Best children's book illustrator ===
- 2004: Mariana Massarani
- 2005: Cárcamo
- 2006: Cárcamo
- 2007: Daniel Bueno
- 2008: Daniel Bueno

=== Best colorist ===
- 1999: Alexandre Jubran
- 2000: Alexandre Jubran
- 2001: Lílian Maruyama
- 2002: André Vazzios
- 2003: Alexandre Jubran
- 2016: (Note: In 2016, this category was called "Best Colorist/Inker" and awarded a colorist.) Cris Peter, for Casanova – Volume 3 – Avaritia, Pétalas and Projeto Manhattan – Volume 1
- 2017: Cris Peter, for Astronauta – Assimetria and Memórias do Mauricio
- 2018: Cris Peter
- 2019: Mariane Gusmão, for Desafiadores do Destino
- 2020: Wagner Willian, for Silvestre

=== Best columnist ===
Until 2007, this category was called "Best Specialized Journalist".

- 1989: Álvaro de Moya
- 1990: André Forastieri
- 2001: Sidney Gusman
- 2002: Sidney Gusman
- 2003: Sidney Gusman
- 2004: Sidney Gusman
- 2005: Sidney Gusman
- 2006: Sidney Gusman
- 2007: Sidney Gusman
- 2008: Paulo Ramos
- 2009: Rogério de Campos
- 2010: Sérgio Codespoti

=== Best editor ===
- 1989: Jal and Gualberto Costa
- 1990: Rogério de Campos

=== Best editorial cartoonist ===
- 1997: Angeli
- 1998: Angeli
- 1999: Angeli
- 2000: Angeli
- 2001: Angeli
- 2002: Angeli
- 2003: Angeli
- 2004: Angeli
- 2005: Angeli
- 2006: Angeli
- 2007: Angeli
- 2008: Angeli
- 2009: Angeli
- 2010: Angeli
- 2011: Angeli
- 2012: Angeli

=== Best foreign penciller ===
The award considers the Brazilian edition of their works.

- 1989: Frank Miller (United States)
- 1990: Dave Stevens (United States)
- 1991: Kent Williams (United States)
- 1992: Katsuhiro Otomo (Japan)
- 1993: Todd McFarlane (Canada)
- 1994: John Romita Jr. (United States)
- 1995: Ivo Milazzo (Italy)
- 1996: George Pratt (United States)
- 1997: Frank Miller (United States)
- 1998: Alex Ross (United States)
- 1999: Will Eisner (United States)
- 2000: Jeff Smith (United States) , for Bone
- 2001: Ivo Milazzo (Italy) , for Ken Parker
- 2002: Ivo Milazzo (Italy) , for Ken Parker
- 2003: Takehiko Inoue (Japan) , for Vagabond
- 2004: Lorenzo Mattotti (Italy) , for Estigmas (Stigmates)
- 2005: Will Eisner (United States) , for Avenida Dropsie (Dropsie Avenue)
- 2006: Milo Manara (Italy) , for Bórgia (I Borgia)
- 2007: Milo Manara (Italy) , for El Gaucho, Bórgia – poder e incesto (I Borgia) and O Clic (Il gioco)
- 2008: John Cassaday (United States) , for Planetary
- 2009: Liniers (Argentina) , for Macanudo
- 2010: Craig Thompson (United States) , for Retalhos (Blankets)
- 2011: John Romita Jr. (United States) , for Kick-Ass and Reinado sombrio (Dark Reign)
- 2012: David Mazzucchelli (United States) , for Asterios Polyp
- 2013: Craig Thompson (United States) , for Habibi
- 2014: Enki Bilal (France) , for Tetralogia Monstro (La Tétralogie du Monstre)
- 2015: Andrew C. Robinson (United States) , for O Quinto Beatle (The Fifth Beatle)

=== Best foreign writer ===
The award considers the Brazilian edition of their works.

- 1989: Alan Moore (United Kingdom)
- 1990: Neil Gaiman (United Kingdom)
- 1991: Alan Moore (United Kingdom)
- 1992: Neil Gaiman (United Kingdom)
- 1993: Neil Gaiman (United Kingdom)
- 1994: Neil Gaiman (United Kingdom)
- 1995: Neil Gaiman (United Kingdom)
- 1996: Art Spiegelman (Sweden)
- 1997: Frank Miller (United States)
- 1998: Garth Ennis (United Kingdom)
- 1999: Frank Miller (United States)
- 2000: David Lapham (United States) , for Balas Perdidas (Stray Bullets)
- 2001: Alan Moore (United Kingdom) , for Do Inferno (From Hell)
- 2002: Giancarlo Berardi (Italy) , for Ken Parker
- 2003: Alan Moore (United Kingdom) , for Tom Strong and Top Ten
- 2004: Alan Moore (United Kingdom) , for A Liga Extraordinária (The League of Extraordinary Gentlemen)
- 2005: Will Eisner (United States) , for Avenida Dropsie (Dropsie Avenue)
- 2006: Osamu Tezuka (Japan) , for Buda (Budda)
- 2007: Kazuo Koike (Japan) , for Lobo Solitário (Kozure Ōkami)
- 2008: Alan Moore (United Kingdom) , for Lost Girls
- 2009: Alan Moore (United Kingdom) , for Promethea
- 2010: Chris Ware (United States) , for Jimmy Corrigan
- 2011: Joe Sacco (Malta) , for Notas sobre Gaza (Footnotes in Gaza)
- 2012: David Mazzucchelli (United States) , for Asterios Polyp
- 2013: Robert Kirkman (United States) , for The Walking Dead
- 2014: Robert Kirkman (United States) , for The Walking Dead
- 2015: Mark Waid (United States) , for Demolidor (Daredevil)

=== Best graphic humor artist ===
- 2013: Angeli
- 2014: Alpino
- 2015: Dálcio Machado

=== Best illustrator ===
- 1997: Kipper
- 1998: Negreiros
- 1999: Patrícia Bisso
- 2000: Garutti
- 2001: Mariza
- 2002: Orlando
- 2003: Renato Guedes
- 2004: Samuel Casal
- 2005: Samuel Casal
- 2006: Orlando
- 2007: Orlando Pedroso
- 2008: Kako
- 2009: Weberson Santiago
- 2010: Samuel Casal

=== Best inker ===
- 2017: Omar Viñole, for Cadernos de Viagem, Yeshuah Absoluto and Zé do Caixão
- 2018: Lu Cafaggi and Vitor Cafaggi
- 2019: Wagner Willian, for O Martírio de Joana Dark Side
- 2020: Shiko, for Três Buracos

=== Best letterer ===
- 1999: Lilian Mitsunaga

=== Best new talent (penciller) ===
Until 2010, this category was called "Revelation Penciller".

- 1990: Osvaldo Pavanelli
- 1991: Jaca
- 1992: Kipper
- 1993: MZK
- 1994: Guazzelli
- 1995: Luciano Queiroz
- 1996: Dalcio
- 1997: Lelis
- 1998: Alan Sieber
- 1999: Luciano Lagares
- 2000: Fábio Moon and Gabriel Bá, for 10 Pãezinhos
- 2001: Fábio Yabu, for Combo Rangers
- 2002: Samuel Casal
- 2003: André Kitagawa, for Front
- 2004: André Bueno, for Front
- 2005: Rafael Sica
- 2006: Julia Bax, for Kaos and Quebra-Queixo
- 2007: Fábio Lyra, for Mosh!
- 2008: Jozz, for Zine Royale
- 2009: Hemeterio, for Chibata! – João Cândido e a revolta que abalou o Brasil
- 2010: Gustavo Duarte, for Có!
- 2011: Felipe Massafera, for Jambocks
- 2012: Magno Costa and Marcelo Costa, for Oeste Vermelho and Matinê
- 2013: Pedro Franz, for Suburbia
- 2014: Lu Cafaggi, for Turma da Mônica - Laços
- 2015: Felipe Nunes, for Klaus
- 2016: Camila Torrano, for Fábulas and Spam
- 2017: Mika Takahashi, for Além dos Trilhos
- 2018: Bruno Seelig
- 2019: Melissa Garabeli, for Saudade
- 2020: Brendda Maria, for Cais do Porto

=== Best new talent (writer) ===
Until 2010, this category was called "Revelation Writer".

- 2007: Daniel Esteves, for Front nº 17
- 2008: Cadu Simões, for Homem-Grilo, Nova Hélade and Garagem Hermética
- 2009: Olintho Gadelha, for Chibata! – João Cândido e a revolta que abalou o Brasil
- 2010: Alex Mir, for Orixás, Subversos and Tempestade cerebral
- 2011: Daniel Galera, for Cachalote
- 2012: Vitor Cafaggi, for Valente para sempre and Duo.tone
- 2013: Raphael Fernandes, for Ida e Volta and Ditadura no Ar nº 2
- 2014: Pedro Cobiaco, for Hermatã
- 2015: Bianca Pinheiro, for Dora and Bear
- 2016: Zé Wellington, for Steampunk Ladies – Vingança a Vapor
- 2017: Wagner Willian, for Bulldogma
- 2018: Carol Pimentel
- 2019: Jéssica Groke, for Me Leve Quando Sair
- 2020: Jefferson Costa, for Roseira, Medalha e Engenho

=== Best penciller ===
- 1989: Alain Voss
- 1990: Luís Gustavo
- 1991: Laerte Coutinho
- 1992: Luiz Gê
- 1993: Octavio Cariello
- 1994: Lourenço Mutarelli
- 1995: Flavio Colin
- 1996: Angeli
- 1997: Mike Deodato
- 1998: Lelis
- 1999: Edgar Vasques
- 2000: Lourenço Mutarelli, for O dobro de cinco
- 2001: Lourenço Mutarelli, for O rei do ponto
- 2002: Lourenço Mutarelli, for A soma de tudo
- 2003: Laerte Coutinho, for Deus 2 and Classificados 2
- 2004: Samuel Casal, for Front
- 2005: Fábio Moon and Gabriel Bá, for 10 Pãezinhos – crítica
- 2006: Spacca, for Santô e os pais da aviação
- 2007: Fábio Moon and Gabriel Bá, for Mesa para dois
- 2008: Spacca, for D. João Carioca
- 2009: Rafael Grampá, for Mesmo Delivery
- 2010: Marcelo Quintanilha, for Sábado dos meus amores
- 2011: Danilo Beyruth, for Bando de dois
- 2012: Marcelo Lélis, for Saino a percurá – atra vez
- 2013: Danilo Beyruth, for Astronauta - Magnetar
- 2014: Shiko, for Piteco - Ingá and O Azul Indiferente do Céu
- 2015: Laudo Ferreira Jr., for Yeshuah – Volume 3 – Onde Tudo Está
- 2016: Rogério Coelho, for Louco – Fuga and O Barco dos Sonhos
- 2017: Guilherme Petreca, for Ye
- 2018: Marcelo D'Salete
- 2019: Marcelo Lélis, for Anuí
- 2020: Jefferson Costa, for Roseira, Medalha e Engenho

=== Best writer ===
- 1989: Laerte Coutinho
- 1990: Laerte Coutinho
- 1991: Laerte Coutinho
- 1992: Guilherme de Almeida Prado
- 1993: André Toral
- 1994: Patati
- 1995: Ota
- 1996: Newton Foot
- 1997: Laerte Coutinho
- 1998: Paulo Garfunkel
- 1999: Lourenço Mutarelli
- 2000: André Toral
- 2001: André Toral
- 2002: Wellington Srbek
- 2003: Lourenço Mutarelli
- 2004: André Diniz
- 2005: Lourenço Mutarelli
- 2006: Spacca, for Santô e os pais da aviação
- 2007: Lourenço Mutarelli, for Caixa de areia
- 2008: Wander Antunes, for O corno que sabia demais and A boa sorte de Solano Dominguez
- 2009: Adriana Brunstein and Samuel Casal, for Prontuário 666
- 2010: André Diniz, for 7 vidas, A revolta de Canudos and Ato 5
- 2011: Danilo Beyruth, for Bando de dois
- 2012: André Diniz, for Morro da Favela
- 2013: Gustavo Duarte, for Monstros!
- 2014: Vitor Cafaggi and Lu Cafaggi, for Turma da Mônica - Laços
- 2015: Marcello Quintanilha, for Tungstênio
- 2016: Lillo Parra, for Descobrindo um Novo Mundo and La Dansarina
- 2017: Laudo Ferreira, for Cadernos de Viagem, Yeshuah Absoluto and Zé do Caixão
- 2018: Marcelo D'Salete
- 2019: Laudo Ferreira Jr., for O Santo Sangue
- 2020: Daniel Esteves, for Sobre o Tempo em Que Estive Morta and Último Assalto / Fefê Torquato, for Tina: Respeito

== Works ==
=== Best adaptation from TV to comics ===
- 1989: Juba & Lula, by Regis Rocha Moreira and Hector Gómez Alisio (Nova Fronteira)
- 1990: Juba & Lula – uma aventura na Amazônia, by Regis Rocha Moreira and Hector Gómez Alisio (Nova Fronteira)

=== Best adventure album ===
- 1995: Ken Parker – os cervos & um hálito de gelo (Cuccioli / Un alito di ghiaccio), by Giancarlo Berardi and Ivo Milazzo (Ensaio)
- 1999: Caatinga, by Hermann Huppen (Globo)
- 2000: Adeus, chamigo brasileiro – uma história da Guerra do Paraguai, by André Toral (Companhia das Letras)
- 2001: Ken Parker – um príncipe para Norma (Un principe per Norma), by Giancarlo Berardi, Ivo Milazzo and Giorgio Trevisan (CLUQ)
- 2002: A soma de tudo, by Lourenço Mutarelli (Devir)
- 2003: A soma de tudo – parte II, by Lourenço Mutarelli (Devir)
- 2004: Quebra-Queixo – technorama, by Marcelo Campos and many pencillers (Devir)
- 2005: A Liga Extraordinária – volume II (The League of Extraordinary Gentlemen, Volume II), by Alan Moore and Kevin O'Neill (Devir)
- 2006: As aventuras de Tintim – os charutos do faraó (Les Cigares du Pharaon), by Hergé (Cia. das Letras)
- 2007: 100 Balas – blues para um minuteman (100 Bullets – The Hard Way), by Brian Azzarello and Eduardo Risso (Opera Graphica)
- 2008: Os 300 de Esparta (300), by Frank Miller (Devir)

=== Best adventure comic book ===
- 1998: The Savage Dragon, by Erik Larsen (Abril Jovem)
- 2004: 100 Balas (100 Bullets), by Brian Azzarello and Eduardo Risso (Opera Graphica)
- 2005: Marvel Max, by may authors (Panini)
- 2006: Lobo Solitário (Kozure Ōkami), by Kazuo Koike and Goseki Kojima (Panini)
- 2007: Lobo Solitário (Kozure Ōkami), by Kazuo Koike and Goseki Kojima (Panini)
- 2008: Lobo Solitário (Kozure Ōkami), by Kazuo Koike and Goseki Kojima (Panini)

=== Best adventure and fiction comic book ===
- 1989: Aventura e Ficção, by many authors (Abril)
- 1990: Aventura e Ficção, by many authors (Abril)
- 1994: Pau Brasil, by many authors (Vidente)
- 1996: Tex – Edição Especial Colorida (Tex #400), by Claudio Nizzi and Aurelio Galleppini (Globo)
- 1999: Gen 13 & WildC.A.T.S., by many authors (Abril Jovem)
- 2000: Quebra-Queixo, by Marcelo Campos (Brainstore)
- 2001: Mirabilia, by Wellington Srbek, Júlio Shimamoto, Flavio Colin and Klévisson Viana (Tupynanquim)
- 2002: 100 Balas (100 Bullets), by Brian Azzarello and Eduardo Risso (Opera Graphica)
- 2003: Vagabond, by Takehiko Inoue (Conrad)

=== Best adventure/horror/fantasy publication ===
This category was merged from "Best Adventure Album", "Best Adventure Comic Book", "Best Adventure and Fiction Comic Book", "Best Fiction Album", "Best Fiction, Adventure and Horror Album", "Best Horror Album", "Best Horror Comic Book" and "Best Horror Publication"; and, until 2015, this category was called "Best Adventure/Horror/Fiction Publication".

- 2009: 100 Balas (100 Bullets), by Brian Azzarello and Eduardo Risso (Pixel)
- 2010: J. Kendall – aventuras de uma criminóloga (Julia – Le avventure di una criminologa), by Giancarlo Berardi and many pencillers
- 2011: Vertigo, by many authors (Panini)
- 2012: Birds, by Gustavo Duarte (independent)
- 2013: The Walking Dead, by Robert Kirkman and Tony Moore (HQM)
- 2014: Piteco - Ingá, by Shiko (Panini)
- 2015: Astronauta – Singularidade, by Danilo Beyruth (Panini)
- 2016: Lavagem, by Shiko (Panini)
- 2017: Astronauta – Assimetria, by Danilo Beyruth (Panini)
- 2018: Meu Amigo Dahmer (My Friend Dahmer), by Derf Backderf (Darkside)
- 2019: Samurai Shirô, by Danilo Beyruth (DarkSide)
- 2020: Gibi de Menininha 2, by many authors (Zarabatana)

=== Best caricatures publication ===
Until 2003, this category was called "Best Caricatures Book".

- 1998: Quem é Sábat?, by Sábat
- 1999: Fatores de risco – coletânea de charges e caricaturas, by Erthal (Paz e Terra)
- 2000: Sem perder a linha, by Fausto (Ediouro)
- 2002: O poder sem pudor, by Cláudio Humberto and Osvaldo Pavanelli (Diário Popular)
- 2003: Alfabeto literário, by Loredano (Geração)
- 2008: É mentira, Chico?, by Ziraldo (Capivara)
- 2010: 50 razões para rir, by Toni D'Agostinho (Noovha América)
- 2011: Bravo! Literatura & Futebol, by Ricardo Soares (Abril)

=== Best cartoons publication ===
Until 2003, this category was called "Best Cartoons Book".

- 1994: Ninguém é de ferro, by Santiago (L&PM)
- 1995: Soltando as hienas, by Biratan
- 1996: Humor gráfico na Bahia – o traço dos mestres, by Gutemberg Cruz (Arembepe)
- 1997: Urubu e o Flamengo, by Henfil (34)
- 1998: De papo pro ar, by Santiago (L&PM)
- 1999: Humor em risco – cartuns, by Érico
- 2000: A vida por uma linha, by Samuca
- 2001: Paraíba e Piauí no cartum – com todo o risco, by many authors
- 2002: Risco de 7 cabeças – o melhor do cartum paraense, by many authors
- 2003: Humor pela paz e a falta que ela faz, by Mario Dimov Mastrotti, organizer (Virgo)
- 2004: Sexo é uma coisa suja, by Angeli (Devir)
- 2005: Bem, Obrigado. E Você? / Quinoterapia / Quanta Bondade!, by Quino (Martins Fontes)
- 2006: Sem comentários, by Allan Sieber (Casa 21)
- 2007: Antologia do Pasquim – vol. 1, by many authors (Desiderata)
- 2008: Assim rasteja a humanidade, by Allan Sieber (Desiderata)
- 2009: Tulípio #7, by Eduardo Rodrigues and Paulo Stocker (independent)
- 2010: Sem palavras, by Samuca (independent)
- 2011: Cócegas no raciocínio, by João Montanaro (Garimpo)

=== Best children's album ===
- 1989: A essência de Calvin e Haroldo (The Essential Calvin and Hobbes), by Bill Watterson (Cedibra)
- 1998: Lucas – coleção Fala Menino, by Luis Augusto (Bureau)
- 1999: A baleia Branca (Moby Dick), by Will Eisner (Cia. das Letras)
- 2000: A turma do Xaxado, by Antonio Cedraz (independent)
- 2001: Suriá e o mundo do circo, by Laerte Coutinho (Devir)
- 2002: A turma do Xaxado 2, by Antonio Cedraz (independent)
- 2003: Todo Pererê – volume 1, by Ziraldo (Salamandra)
- 2004: Little Lit – fábulas e contos de fadas em quadrinhos (Little Lit), by many authors (Cia. das Letras)
- 2005: Todo Pererê – volume 3, by Ziraldo (Salamandra)
- 2006: Turma do Xaxado – Pelourinho em quadrinhos, by Antonio Cedraz (independent)
- 2007: Turma do Xaxado – lendas e mistérios, by Antonio Cedraz (independent)

=== Best children's book ===
- 1997: O homem no teto (The Man in the Ceiling), by Jules Feiffer (Cia. das Letras)
- 1998: Castelo Rá-Tim-Bum, by Fernandes, illustrator
- 1999: Bamboletras, by Dilan Camargo and Guazzelli, illustrator (Projeto)
- 2000: Boneco maluco e outras brincadeiras, by Elias José and Guazzelli, illustrator (Projeto)
- 2002: Nós e os bichos, by Marcelo R. L. Oliveira and Cárcamo, illustrator (Companhia das Letrinhas)

=== Best children's comic book ===
- 1989: Revistinha do Ziraldo, by Ziraldo (Abril)
- 1990: O Menino Maluquinho, by Ziraldo (Abril)
- 1991: Trapalhões, by many authors (Abril)
- 1992: Trapalhões, by many authors (Abril)
- 1993: Chico Bento, by many authors (Globo)
- 1994: Parque da Mônica, by many authors (Globo)
- 1995: Mônica, by many authors (Globo)
- 1996: Mônica, by many authors (Globo)
- 1997: Sailor Moon (Bishōjo Senshi Sērā Mūn), by Naoko Takeuchi (Abril Jovem)
- 1998: Almanaque da Mônica, by many authors (Globo)
- 1999: Turma da Mônica, by many authors (Globo)
- 2000: Chico Bento, by many authors (Globo)
- 2001: Turma da Mônica, by many authors (Globo)
- 2002: Mico Legal, by Sergio Morettini (Escala)
- 2003: Turma do Xaxado 3, by Antonio Cedraz (independent)
- 2004: Minha Revistinha – Turma do Xaxado, by Antonio Cedraz (independent)
- 2005: O Menino Maluquinho, by Ziraldo (Globo)
- 2006: O Menino Maluquinho, by Ziraldo (Globo)
- 2007: O Menino Maluquinho, by Ziraldo (Globo)

=== Best children's publication ===
This category was merged from "Best Children's Album" and "Best Children's Comic Book"; and, between 2009 and 2015, this category was called "Best Child and Youth Publication".

- 2008: As tiras clássicas da Turma da Mônica, by many authors (Panini)
- 2009: Turma da Mônica Jovem, by many authors (Panini)
- 2010: Turma da Mônica Jovem, by many authors (Panini)
- 2011: Pequenos Heróis, by many authors (Devir)
- 2012: Turma da Mônica Jovem, by many authors (Panini)
- 2013: Turma da Mônica Jovem – O casamento da Mônica, by many authors (Panini)
- 2014: Turma da Mônica – Laços, by Vitor Cafaggi and Lu Cafaggi (Panini)
- 2015: Aú, o Capoeirista e o Fantasma do Farol, by Flávio Luiz (Papel A2 Texto & Arte)
- 2016: Chico Bento #1–8, by many authors (Panini)
- 2017: O Roubo do Marsupilami (Les voleurs du Marsupilami), by Franquin (SESI-SP)
- 2018: Combo Rangers – Somos Iguais, by Fábio Yabu and Michel Borges (JBC)
- 2019: Os Diários de Amora (Les Carnets de Cerise), by Aurélie Neyret and Joris Chamblain (Nemo)
- 2020: Como Fazer Amigos e Enfrentar Fantasmas, by Gustavo Borges and Eric Peleias (independent)

=== Best classic album ===
- 1989: Príncipe Valente (Prince Valiant), by Hal Foster (EBAL)
- 1990: Príncipe Valente (Prince Valiant), by Hal Foster (EBAL)
- 1991: Príncipe Valente (Prince Valiant), by Hal Foster (EBAL)
- 1992: Príncipe Valente (Prince Valiant), by Hal Foster (EBAL)
- 1993: Príncipe Valente (Prince Valiant), by Hal Foster (EBAL)
- 1994: A volta do Fradim, by Henfil (Geração)
- 1995: Graúna ataca outra vez, by Henfil (Geração)
- 1996: Príncipe Valente (Prince Valiant), by Hal Foster (EBAL)
- 1997: Batman Clássico, by Bob Kane (L&PM)
- 1998: Will Eisner's Spirit Magazine, by Will Eisner (Metal Pesado)
- 1999: V de Vingança (V for Vendetta), by Alan Moore and David Lloyd (Via Lettera)
- 2000: Gen – pés descalços – uma história de Hiroshima (Hadashi no Gen), by Keiji Nakazawa (Conrad)
- 2001: Gen – pés descalços – uma história de Hiroshima (Hadashi no Gen), by Keiji Nakazawa (Conrad)
- 2002: Príncipe Valente XVI – uma nova era (Prince Valiant), by Hal Foster (Opera Graphica)
- 2003: Fritz the Cat, by Robert Crumb (Conrad)

=== Best classic comic book ===
- 1989: Spirit, by Will Eisner
- 1990: Cripta do Terror
- 1991: Spirit, by Will Eisner
- 1995: Coleção Invictus, by many authors (Nova Sampa)
- 2003: Novos Deuses (New Gods), by Jack Kirby (Opera Graphica)

=== Best classic publication ===
This category was merged from "Best Classic Album" and "Best Classic Comic Book".

- 2004: Zap Comix, by Robert Crumb (Conrad)
- 2005: Todo Pererê No. 3, by Ziraldo (Salamandra)
- 2006: Maus, by Art Spiegelman (Cia. das Letras)
- 2007: Corto Maltese – a balada do mar salgado (Una ballata del mare salato), by Hugo Pratt (Pixel)
- 2008: Um contrato com Deus e outras histórias de cortiço (A Contract with God), by Will Eisner (Devir)
- 2009: Che – os últimos dias de um herói (Vida del Che), by Héctor Oesterheld, Alberto Breccia and Enrique Breccia (Conrad)
- 2010: Peanuts completo – 1950 a 1952 (The Complete Peanuts), by Charles Schulz (L&PM)
- 2011: Peanuts completo (The Complete Peanuts), by Charles Schulz (L&PM)
- 2012: Arzach, by Moebius (Nemo)
- 2013: Diomedes – a trilogia do acidente, by Lourenço Mutarelli (Quadrinhos na Cia)
- 2014: Fradim, 'by Henfil (Henfil – Educação e Sustentabilidade)
- 2015: A Saga do Monstro do Pântano – Volumes 1 a 3 (Saga of the Swamp Thing), by many authors (Panini)
- 2016: Zodíaco Premium, by Jayme Cortez (Opera Graphica)
- 2017: Sharaz-de – Contos de As Mil e Uma Noites – Volume 1 (Sharaz-de), by Sergio Toppi (Figura)
- 2018: Akira, by Katsuhiro Otomo (JBC)
- 2019: Akira 2, by Katsuhiro Otomo (JBC)
- 2020: Akira 6, by Katsuhiro Otomo (JBC)

=== Best comic strips publication ===
- 2004: Níquel Náusea – nem tudo que balança cai, by Fernando Gonsales (Devir)
- 2005: Níquel Náusea – vá pentear macacos, by Fernando Gonsales (Devir)
- 2006: Níquel Náusea – a perereca da vizinha, by Fernando Gonsales (Devir)
- 2007: Níquel Náusea – tédio no chiqueiro, by Fernando Gonsales (Devir)
- 2008: O mundo é mágico – Calvin e Haroldo (It's a Magical World), by Bill Watterson (Conrad)
- 2009: Níquel Náusea – em boca fechada não entra mosca, by Fernando Gonsales (Devir)
- 2010: Níquel Náusea – um tigre, dois tigres, três tigres, by Fernando Gonsales (Devir)
- 2011: Níquel Náusea – a vaca foi pro brejo, by Fernando Gonsales (Devir)
- 2012: Macanudo 4, by Liniers (Zarabatana)
- 2013: Valente para todas, by Vitor Cafaggi (independent)
- 2014: Valente por opção, by Vitor Cafaggi (Panini)
- 2015: A Vida com Logan – para ler no sofá, by Flavio Soares (Jupati Books)
- 2016: Will Tirando, by Will Leite (independent)
- 2017: Quadrinhos dos Anos 10, by André Dahmer (Quadrinhos na Cia)
- 2018: Linha do Trem – The Best Of, by Raphael Salimena (Draco)
- 2019: Will Tirando nº 2, by Will Leite (independent)
- 2020: Batatinha Fantasma, by Carol Borges and Filipe Remedios (independent)

=== Best comics adaptation ===
- 2009: Literatura Mundial em Quadrinhos #1: Dom Quixote, by Bira Dantas (Escala)
- 2010: Jubiabá de Jorge Amado, by Spacca (Quadrinhos na Cia)
- 2011: Grandes Clássicos em Graphic Novel #5: Os Sertões – a luta, by Carlos Ferreira and Rodrigo Rosa (Desiderata)
- 2012: Clara dos Anjos, by Wander Antunes and Marcelo Lelis (Quadrinhos na Cia)
- 2013: Coleção Shakespeare em Quadrinhos No. 4 A Tempestade, by Lillo Parra and Jefferson Costa (Nemo)
- 2014: Dom Casmurro, by Felipe Greco and Mario Cau (Devir)
- 2015: Grande Sertão: Veredas, by Eloar Guazzelli and Rodrigo Rosa (Globo)
- 2016: Dois Irmãos, by Fábio Moon and Gabriel Bá (Quadrinhos na Cia)
- 2017: Sharaz-de – Contos de As Mil e Uma Noites – Volume 1 (Sharaz-de), by Sergio Toppi (Figura)
- 2018: Moby Dick, by Christophe Chabouté (Pipoca & Nanquim)
- 2019: A Revolução dos Bichos, by Odyr (Quadrinhos na Cia)
- 2020: Travesti, by Edmond Baudoin and Mircea Cărtărescu (Veneta)

=== Best editorial cartoons publication ===
Until 2003, this category was called "Best Editorial Cartoons Book".

- 1993: Fora Collor, by Chico Caruso (Globo)
- 1994: Separatismo – corta essa, by many authors (L&PM)
- 1995: Loredano caricaturas: mancha, traço, página – a forma do cotidiano, by Cássio Loredano (Topbooks)
- 1996: FHC – Biografia não autorizada, by Angeli (Ensaio / Circo)
- 1998: 100 vezes Ique no Estadão, by Ique (Salamandra)
- 1999: Pittadas de Maluf, by Cláudio (Boitempo)
- 2000: Falando sério, by Fred (UFPB)
- 2001: Humor do fim do século, by Clériston, Lailson, Miguel, Ronaldo and Samuca
- 2002: Se arrependimento matasse, by Nani (Veloc)
- 2003: Era uma vez FH, by Chico Caruso (Devir)
- 2004: OPasquim21, by many authors
- 2005: OPasquim21, by many authors
- 2006: Diabo Coxo, by Angelo Agostini (Edusp)
- 2007: Antologia do Pasquim – vol. 1, by many authors (Desiderata)
- 2008: Urubu, by Henfil (Desiderata)
- 2009: Catálogo do 35º Salão Internacional de Humor de Piracicaba, by many authors (Imprensa Oficial)
- 2010: Catálogo do Salão de Humor da Anistia, by many authors (Senado Federal)
- 2011: Gibi do Glauco, by Glauco Villas Boas (Folha de S.Paulo)

=== Best editorial project ===
- 1997: Gibizão da Turma da Mônica, by many authors (Globo)
- 1998: Coleção miniTonto, by many authors (Tonto)
- 1999: Olho Mágico, by many authors (Tonto)
- 2000: Comic book – o novo quadrinho americano, by many authors (Conrad)
- 2001: Humor Brasil – 500 anos, by many authors (Conrad)
- 2002: Front, by many authors (Via Lettera)
- 2003: Front, by many authors (Via Lettera)
- 2004: Sandman – noites sem fim (The Sandman: Endless Nights), by Neil Gaiman and many pencillers (Conrad)
- 2005: O Melhor da Disney – as obras completas de Carl Barks, by Carl Barks (Abril Jovem)
- 2006: Coleção "Cidades ilustradas", by many authors (Casa 21)
- 2007: Cidades ilustradas – cidades do ouro, by Lelis (Casa 21)
- 2008: Laertevisão – coisas que não esqueci, by Laerte (Conrad)
- 2009: Turma da Mônica Jovem, by many authors (Panini)
- 2010: MSP 50 – Mauricio de Sousa por 50 artistas, by many authors (Panini)
- 2011: Calendário Pindura 2011, by many authors (Pegasus Alado)
- 2012: MSP Novos 50 – Mauricio de Sousa por 50 Novos Artistas, by many authors (Panini)
- 2013: Graphic MSP, by many authors (Panini)
- 2014: Coleção Moebius, by Moebius (Nemo)
- 2015: Humor Paulistano – A Experiência da Circo Editorial, 1984–1995, by Toninho Mendes, organizer (SESI-SP)
- 2016: O Fabuloso Quadrinho Brasileiro de 2015, by Rafael Coutinho, Clarice Reichstul and Érico Assis, organizers (Veneta)
- 2017: A Liga Extraordinária – Dossiê Negro – Edição de Luxo Limitada (The League of Extraordinary Gentlemen: Black Dossier), by Alan Moore and Kevin O'Neill (Devir)
- 2018: Os Mundos de Jack Kirby – um tributo ao rei dos quadrinhos, by many authors (Guia dos Quadrinhos)
- 2019: A Arte de Charlie Chan Hock Chye (The Art of Charlie Chan Hock Chye), by Sonny Liew (Pipoca & Nanquim)
- 2020: Batman Noir Collection (Panini)

=== Best erotic publication ===
Until 2001, this category was called "Best Erotic Album".

- 1989: As 110 pílulas (Le 110 pillole), by Magnus (Martins Fontes)
- 1990: Necron, by Magnus (L&PM)
- 1991: Little Ego, by Giardino (Martins Fontes) / Sampa Graphic Album #2: Fetichast – províncias do desejo, by José Márcio Nicolosi (Sampa) / O Clic 2 (Il gioco 2), by Milo Manara (Martins Fontes)
- 1992: Druuna, by Paolo Eleuteri Serpieri
- 1993: Druuna, by Paolo Eleuteri Serpieri
- 1994: Kama Sutra, by Milo Manara (L&PM)
- 2001: Volúpia, by Julio Shimamoto (Opera Graphica)
- 2007: Valentina – Crepax 65–66, by Guido Crepax (Conrad)
- 2008: Lost Girls, by Alan Moore e Melinda Gebbie (Devir)
- 2009: Clic 3 (Il gioco vol.3), by Milo Manara (Conrad)
- 2010: Verão índio (Tutto ricominciò con un'estate indiana), by Hugo Pratt and Milo Manara (Conrad)
- 2011: Quadrinhos sacanas – o catecismo brasileiro, by Toninho Mendes, organizer (Peixe Grande)
- 2012: Black Kiss, by Howard Chaykin (Devir)
- 2016: Caravaggio – A Morte da Virgem (Caravaggio – La tavolozza e la spada), by Milo Manara (Veneta)

=== Best fanzine ===
- 1990: Saga, by Ale Librandi Hy, Walter Junior and Marcelo Fernandes de Carvalho, editors
- 1991: Nhô-Quim, by Henrique Magalhães and José Carlos Ribeiro, editors / Guia das HQs / Tindie
- 1992: Matrix, by Gazy Andraus, editor
- 1993: Panacea, by José Mauro Kazi, editor
- 1994: Boletim de HQ, by USP's Núcleo de Pesquisas de Histórias em Quadrinhos / Saga, by Ale Librandi Hy, Walter Junior and Marcelo Fernandes de Carvalho, editors
- 1995: Cachalote
- 1996: Glória, Glória, Aleluia!, by Allan Sieber
- 1997: Anime Club
- 1998: Heroína, by Zed and Fido Neste
- 1999: Slam!
- 2000: 10 Pãezinhos, by Fábio Moon and Gabriel Bá
- 2001: Enzima
- 2002: Manicomics, by J.J. Marreiro, editor
- 2003: Informal, by André Diniz and Antonio Eder, editores
- 2004: Xerocs Porcoration, by Samuel Casal, Galvão Bertazzi and Artur de Carvalho
- 2005: Manicomics, by J.J. Marreiro, editor
- 2006: Manicomics, by J.J. Marreiro, editor
- 2007: Subterrâneo

=== Best fiction album ===
- 1989: Major Fatal (Le Garage Hermétique), by Moebius (L&PM)
- 1990: A Mulher Enigma (La Femme Piège), by Enki Bilal (Martins Fontes)
- 1995: Eu te amo Lucimar, by Lourenço Mutarelli (Vortex)
- 1999: Seqüelas, by Lourenço Mutarelli (Devir)
- 2000: O dobro de cinco, by Lourenço Mutarelli (Devir)
- 2001: O rei do ponto, by Lourenço Mutarelli (Devir)
- 2002: O Gralha, by many authors (Via Lettera)
- 2003: 10 na área, um na banheira e ninguém no gol, by many authors (Via Lettera)

=== Best fiction, adventure and horror album ===
- 1991: Bradbury – o papa-defuntos, by Ray Bradbury and many pencillers (L&PM)
- 1992: Bradbury – o pequeno assassino, by Ray Bradbury and many pencillers (L&PM)
- 1994: Tex – a marca da serpente (Tex Albo Speciale (Texone) #3), by Claudio Nizzi and Aurelio Galleppini (Globo)
- 1996: Maus II – a história de um sobrevivente – e foi aí que começaram meus problemas, by Art Spiegelman (Brasiliense)
- 1997: Sin City – cidade do pecado, by Frank Miller (Globo)
- 1998: A confluência da forquilha, by Lourenço Mutarelli (Lilás)

=== Best foreign comic strip ===
The award considers the Brazilian edition of the works.

- 1989: Frank e Ernest (United States) , by Bob Thaves
- 1990: Calvin e Haroldo (Calvin and Hobbes) (United States) , by Bill Watterson
- 1991: Calvin e Haroldo (Calvin and Hobbes) (United States) , by Bill Watterson
- 1992: Calvin e Haroldo (Calvin and Hobbes) (United States) , by Bill Watterson
- 1993: Calvin e Haroldo (Calvin and Hobbes) (United States) , by Bill Watterson
- 1994: Calvin e Haroldo (Calvin and Hobbes) (United States) , by Bill Watterson
- 1995: Calvin e Haroldo (Calvin and Hobbes) (United States) , by Bill Watterson
- 1996: Calvin e Haroldo (Calvin and Hobbes) (United States) , by Bill Watterson
- 1997: Dilbert (United States) , by Scott Adams
- 1998: Dilbert (United States) , by Scott Adams
- 1999: Dilbert (United States) , by Scott Adams
- 2000: Snoopy (Peanuts) (United States) , by Charles M. Schulz
- 2001: Dilbert (United States) , by Scott Adams
- 2002: Calvin e Haroldo (Calvin and Hobbes) (United States) , by Bill Watterson
- 2003: Calvin e Haroldo (Calvin and Hobbes) (United States) , by Bill Watterson

=== Best foreign graphic novel ===
The award considers the Brazilian edition of the works.

- 1989: Graphic Novel #2: Demolidor (Marvel Graphic Novel #24) (United States) , by Frank Miller and Bill Sienkiewicz (Abril)
- 1990: Graphic Novel #12: Rocketeer (The Rocketeer) (United States) , by Dave Stevens (Abril)
- 1991: Graphic Album #1: Drácula (Marvel Graphic Novel #26) (United States) , by Jon J. Muth (Abril Jovem)
- 1992: Graphic Album #6: Elektra Vive (Elektra Lives Again) (United States) , by Frank Miller and Lynn Varley (Abril Jovem)
- 1993: Graphic Globo #11: Exterminador 17 (Exterminateur 17) (France) , by Jean-Pierre Dionnet and Enki Bilal (Globo)
- 1994: Wolverine – fúria interior (Wolverine: Inner Fury) (United States) , by Dan Chichester and Bill Sienkiewicz (Abril Jovem)
- 1995: Tex – o grande roubo (Tex Albo Speciale (Texone) #6) (Italy) , by Claudio Nizzi and José Ortiz (Globo)
- 1996: Ás inimigo – um poema de guerra (Enemy Ace: War Idyll) (United States) , by George Pratt (Abril Jovem)
- 1997: Tex – o vale do terror (Tex Albo Speciale (Texone) #9) (Italy) , by Claudio Nizzi e Magnus (Globo)
- 1998: Lobo/Juiz Dredd – motoqueiros doidos vs. mutantes do inferno (Lobo/Judge Dredd: Psycho Bikers Vs. The Mutants From Hell) (United States) , by Alan Grant, John Wagner and Val Semeiks (Abril Jovem)
- 1999: O Sistema (The System) (United States) , by Peter Kuper (Abril Jovem)
- 2000: Tex Gigante #1: Tex – o homem de Atlanta (Tex Albo Speciale (Texone) #10) (Italy) , by Claudio Nizzi and Jordi Bernet (Mythos)
- 2001: Palestina – uma nação ocupada (Palestine) (United States) , by Joe Sacco (Conrad)
- 2002: Gorazde – área de segurança (Safe Area Goražde) (United States) , by Joe Sacco (Conrad)
- 2003: A Paixão do Arlequim (Harlequin Valentine), (United States) , by Neil Gaiman and John Bolton (Conrad)

=== Best foreign miniseries ===
The award considers the Brazilian edition of the works.

- 1989: Elektra assassina (Elektra: Assassin) (United States) , by Frank Miller and Bill Sienkiewicz (Abril)
- 1990: Orquídea Negra (Black Orchid) (United States) , by Neil Gaiman and Dave McKean (Abril Jovem)
- 1991: V de Vingança (V for Vendetta) (United Kingdom) , by Alan Moore and David Lloyd (Globo)
- 1992: Os Livros da Magia (The Books of Magic) (United States) , by Neil Gaiman and many pencillers (Abril Jovem)
- 1993: Batman/Juiz Dredd – julgamento em Gotham (Batman/Judge Dredd: Judgment on Gotham) (United States) , by Alan Grant, John Wagner and Simon Bisley (Abril Jovem)
- 1994: Batman – a espada de Azrael (Batman: Sword of Azrael) (United States) , by Denny O'Neil e Joe Quesada (Abril Jovem)
- 1995: Lobo está morto (Lobo's Back) (United States) , by Keith Giffen, Alan Grant and Simon Bisley (Abril Jovem)
- 1996: Marvels (United States) , by Kurt Busiek and Alex Ross (Abril Jovem)
- 1997: No coração da tempestade (To the Heart of the Storm) (United States) , by Will Eisner (Abril Jovem)
- 1998: O Reino do Amanhã (Kingdom Come) (United States) , by Mark Waid and Alex Ross (Abril Jovem)
- 1999: Batman – preto e branco (Batman Black and White) (United States) , by many authors (Abril Jovem)
- 2000: Ken Parker – onde morrem os titãs (Dove muoiono i Titani) (Italy) , by Giancarlo Berardi and Ivo Milazzo (CLUQ)
- 2001: Batman e Tarzan (Batman/Tarzan: Claws of the Cat-woman) (United States) , by Ron Marz and Igor Kordey (Mythos)
- 2002: As aventuras da Liga Extraordinária (The League of Extraordinary Gentlemen) (United States) , by Alan Moore and Kevin O'Neill (Pandora)
- 2003: Wolverine – origem (Origin) (United States) , by Paul Jenkins and Andy Kubert (Panini)

=== Best foreign special edition ===
The award considers the Brazilian edition of the works.

- 2004: Sandman – noites sem fim (The Sandman: Endless Nights) (United States) , by Neil Gaiman and many pencillers (Conrad)
- 2005: À sombra das torres ausentes (In the Shadow of No Towers) (United States) , by Art Spiegelman (Cia. das Letras)
- 2006: Maus (United States) , by Art Spiegelman (Cia. das Letras)
- 2007: Corto Maltese – sob o signo de Capricórnio (Sous le signe du Capricorne) (France) , by Hugo Pratt (Pixel)
- 2008: Persépolis completo (Persepolis) (France) , by Marjane Satrapi (Cia. das Letras)
- 2009: Asterix e seus amigos (Astérix et ses Amis) (France) , by many authors (Record)
- 2010: Gênesis (The Book of Genesis) (United States) , by Robert Crumb (Conrad)
- 2011: RanXerox (Italy) , by Tanino Liberatore and Stefano Tamburini (Conrad)
- 2012: Asterios Polyp (United States) , by David Mazzucchelli (Quadrinhos na Cia)
- 2013: Pinóquio (Pinocchio) (France) , by Winshluss (Globo)
- 2014: Pobre Marinheiro (Poor Sailor) (United States) , by Sammy Harkham (Balão)
- 2015: O Quinto Beatle (The Fifth Beatle) (United States) , by Vivek J. Tiwary, Andrew C. Robinson and Kyle Baker (Aleph)
- 2016: Pílulas azuis (Pilules Bleues) (Switzerland) , by Frederik Peeters (Nemo)
- 2017: The Ghost in the Shell (Kōkaku Kidōtai) (Japan) , by Masamune Shirow (JBC)
- 2018: Moby Dick (France) , by Christophe Chabouté (Pipoca & Nanquim)
- 2019: Mort Cinder (Argentina) , by Héctor Germán Oesterheld and Alberto Breccia (Figura)
- 2020: O Eternauta 1969 (El Eternauta) (Argentina) , by Héctor Germán Oesterheld and Alberto Breccia (Comix Zone)

=== Best graphic humor publication ===
This category was merged from " Best Caricatures Publication", "Best Cartoons Publication" and "Best Editorial Cartoons Publication".

- 2012: Uma Patada Com Carinho, by Chiquinha (Leya/Barba Negra)
- 2013: Se a vida fosse como a internet, by Pablo Carranza (Beleléu)
- 2014: Os Grandes Artistas da Mad – Sergio Aragonés (MAD’s Greatest Artists: Sergio Aragonés: Five Decades of His Finest Works), by Sergio Aragonés (Panini)
- 2015: Có! & Birds, by Gustavo Duarte (Quadrinhos na Cia)
- 2016: Ah, como era boa a Ditadura..., by Luiz Gê (Quadrinhos na Cia)

=== Best graphic project ===
- 1989: Chiclete com Banana, by Angeli (Circo)
- 1990: Martins Fontes
- 1991: Chiclete com Banana, by Angeli (Circo)
- 1992: Fragmentos completos (Revista Goodyear Especial), by Luiz Gê
- 1993: Momotaro – o menino pêssego, by Newton Foot (Ponkã)
- 1994: Território dos bravos, by Luiz Gê (34)
- 1995: Ken Parker – os cervos & um hálito de gelo (Cuccioli / Un alito di ghiaccio), by Giancarlo Berardi and Ivo Milazzo (Ensaio)
- 1996: Rolling Stones – Voodoo Lounge, by Dave McKean (Abril Jovem)
- 1997: No coração da tempestade (To the Heart of the Storm), by Will Eisner (Abril Jovem)
- 1998: Graffiti 76% Quadrinhos, by many authors (independent)
- 1999: Graffiti 76% Quadrinhos, by many authors (independent)
- 2000: Graffiti 76% Quadrinhos, by many authors (independent)
- 2001: Graffiti 76% Quadrinhos, by many authors (independent)
- 2002: Fábrica de Quadrinhos, by many authors (Devir)
- 2003: Ragú Cordel, by many authors (independent)
- 2004: Front, by many authors (Companhia das Letras)
- 2005: À sombra das torres ausentes (In the Shadow of No Towers), by Art Spiegelman (Companhia das Letras)
- 2006: Cidades Ilustradas – Salvador / Cidades Ilustradas – Belém, by Marcello Quintanilha (Salvador) and Jean-Claude Denis (Belém) (Casa 21)
- 2007: Sandman, by Neil Gaiman and many pencillers
- 2008: Laertevisão – coisas que não esqueci, by Laerte
- 2019: Box Noites de Trevas – Metal x Sepultura (Panini)
- 2020: Cartas Para Ninguém, by Diana Salu

=== Best horror album ===
- 1989: Saga de terror, by Jayme Cortez (Martins Fontes)
- 1990: Dr. Jekil
- 2001: Do Inferno (From Hell), by Alan Moore and Eddie Campbell (Via Lettera)
- 2002: No reino do terror, by R. F. Lucchetti (Opera Graphica)
- 2003: Calafrio – 20 anos depois, many authors (Opera Graphica)

=== Best horror comic book ===
- 1990: Sandman, by Neil Gaiman and many pencillers (Globo)
- 1991: Sandman, by Neil Gaiman and many pencillers (Globo)
- 1992: Sandman, by Neil Gaiman and many pencillers (Globo)
- 1993: Sandman, by Neil Gaiman and many pencillers (Globo)
- 1994: Calafrio, by many authors (D-Arte)
- 1995: Hotel do Terror, by Flavio Coin (Otacomix)
- 1996: Coleção Assombração, by many authors (Ediouro)
- 1998: Vertigo DC #1: Monstro do Pântano – lição de anatomia (The Saga of the Swamp Thing #21), by Alan Moore, Stephen Bissette and John Totleben (Metal Pesado)
- 1999: Manticore Especial, by Gian Danton, Antonio Eder, José Aguiar, Luciano Lagares and Márcio Freire (Monalisa)
- 2000: Manticore Especial, by Gian Danton, Antonio Eder, José Aguiar, Luciano Lagares and Márcio Freire (Monalisa)
- 2003: Sandman, by Neil Gaiman and many pencillers (Brianstore)

=== Best horror publication ===
- 2004: Contos bizarros, by many authors (Abril)
- 2005: Dylan Dog, by many authors (Mythos)
- 2006: Dylan Dog, by many authors (Mythos)
- 2007: Os mortos-vivos – dias passados (The Walking Dead #1–6), by Robert Kirkman and Tony Moore (HQM)
- 2008: Black Hole, by Charles Burns (Conrad)

=== Best humor album ===
- 1989: Calvin & Haroldo – algo babando embaixo da cama (Something Under the Bed Is Drooling), by Bill Watterson (Cedibra)
- 1990: Ed Mort em conexão nazista, by Luis Fernando Veríssimo and Miguel Paiva (L&PM)
- 1991: Sir Ney – que rei fui eu, by Novaes (Ícone)
- 1992: Toda Mafalda, by Quino (Martins Fontes)
- 1993: Avenida Brasil – assim caminha a modernidade, by Paulo Caruso (Globo)
- 1994: Mafalda Inédita, by Quino (Martins Fontes)
- 1995: Los 3 amigos 2 – más sexo, más drogas y más guacamoles, by Angeli, Glauco and Laerte (Ensaio)
- 1996: Gato e Gata, by Laerte (Circo / Ensaio)
- 1997: Avenida Brasil – o conjunto nacional, by Paulo Caruso (Globo)
- 1998: Aline e seus dois namorados, by Adão Iturrusgarai
- 1999: O homem ideal (Der bewegte Mann), by Ralf König (Via Lettera)
- 2000: Níquel Náusea – os ratos também choram, by Fernando Gonsales (Bookmakers)
- 2001: Luke & Tantra, by Angeli (Devir)
- 2002: Classificados, by Laerte (Devir)
- 2003: Níquel Náusea – com mil demônios, by Fernando Gonsales (Devir)

=== Best humor comic book ===
- 1989: Chiclete com Banana, by Angeli (Circo)
- 1990: Chiclete com Banana Especial #3: Los tres amigos, by Angeli, Glauco and Laerte (Circo)
- 1991: Piratas do Tietê, by Laerte (Circo)
- 1992: Piratas do Tietê, by Laerte (Circo)
- 1993: Níquel Náusea, by Fernando Gonsales (VHD Diffusion)
- 1994: Striptiras, by Laerte (Circo / Sampa)
- 1995: Big Bang Bang, by Adão Iturrusgarai (Circo)
- 1996: Rê Bordosa – memórias de uma porraloca, by Angeli (Circo)
- 1997: Casseta & Planeta em quadrinhos (Press)
- 1998: O Onanista
- 1999: Sergio Aragonés massacra a Marvel (Sergio Aragonés Massacres Marvel), by Sergio Aragonés (Abril Jovem)
- 2000: Bundas, by many authors
- 2001: Bundas, by many authors
- 2002: Mad, by many authors (Mythos)
- 2003: Grump, by Orlandeli (Escala)

=== Best humor publication ===
This category was merged from "Best Humor Album" and "Best Humor Comic Book".

- 2004: OPasquim21, by many authors
- 2005: Preto no branco, by Allan Sieber (Conrad)
- 2006: Pif Paf, by Millôr Fernandes (Argumento)
- 2007: Níquel Náusea – tédio no chiqueiro, by Fernando Gonsales (Devir)
- 2008: Piratas do Tietê – a saga completa, by Laerte (Devir)
- 2009: Piratas do Tietê – a saga completa – livro 3, by Laerte (Devir)
- 2010: É tudo mais ou menos verdade – jornalismo investigativo, tendencioso e ficcional de Allan Sieber, by Allan Sieber (Desiderata)
- 2016: Guia Culinário do Falido, by many authors (Balão)
- 2017: A Última Bailarina Contra-Ataca, by Guilherme de Sousa (Korja dos Quadrinhos)
- 2018: Marcatti 40, by many authors (Ugra Press)
- 2019: Agente Sommos e o Beliscão Atômico, by Flávio Luiz Nogueira (Papel A2 Texto & Arte)
- 2020: Hell, No! Bem vindo ao inferno, by Leo Finocchi (Balão)

=== Best illustration book ===
- 2000: Arquivo em imagens (série Última Hora) (Imprensa Oficial)
- 2001: Lábaro estrelado, by J. Carlos / Cássio Loredano, organizer and Luciano Trigo, text (Casa da Palavra)

=== Best independent group publication ===
- 2008: Quadrinhópole #4
- 2009: Café Espacial
- 2010: Café Espacial
- 2011: Café Espacial
- 2012: Café Espacial
- 2013: Petisco Apresenta I
- 2014: Café Espacial #12
- 2015: QUAD 2
- 2016: O Gralha – Artbook
- 2017: São Paulo dos Mortos – Volume 3
- 2018: Orixás – Em Guerra
- 2019: Orixás – Renascimento, by Alex Mir, Germana Viana, Laudo Ferreira and Omar Viñole
- 2020: VHS: Video Horror Show

=== Best independent publication ===
Until 2003, this category was called "Best Independent Comic Book"; and, from 2008, this category was split into "Best Independent Group Publication", "Best Independent Pocket Publication", "Best Independent Single Edition Publication" and "Best Independent Sole Publication".

- 1989: Ventosa, by Marcatti
- 1990: Lôdo, by Marcatti
- 1991: Dundum Quadrinhos, by Adão Iturrusgarai and Gilmar Rodrigues, editors
- 1992: Dundum Quadrinhos, by Adão Iturrusgarai and Gilmar Rodrigues, editors
- 1993: RxDxPx Comix, by Marcatti and João Gordo
- 1994: Revista do Ota, by Ota
- 1995: Panacea, by José Mauro Kazi, editor
- 1996: Antologia da Manha
- 1997: Gibizon Radicci, by Iotti
- 1998: Glória, Glória, Aleluia!, by Allan Sieber
- 1999: Caliban, by Wellington Srbek, editor
- 2000: Jane Mastodonte, by Flávio Luís
- 2001: Hipocampo, by Amaral
- 2002: Ragú, by Lin and Mascaro, editores
- 2003: Top! Top!, by Henrique Magalhães
- 2004: Desventuras de Fráuzio, by Marcatti
- 2005: Mosh!, by S. Lobo and Renato Lima, editors
- 2006: Mosh!, by S. Lobo and Renato Lima, editors
- 2007: 10 Pãezinhos – um dia, uma noite, by Gabriel Bá and Fábio Moon

=== Best independent pocket publication ===
- 2008: Juke Box #4, by Renato Lima, editor

=== Best independent single edition publication ===
Until 2010, this category was called "Best Independent Special Publication".

- 2008: O relógio insano, by Eloar Guazzelli
- 2009: Depois da Meia-noite, by Laudo Ferreira Jr. and Omar Viñole
- 2010: Có!, by Gustavo Duarte
- 2011: Taxi, by Gustavo Duarte
- 2012: O louco, a caixa e o homem, by Daniel Esteves and Will
- 2013: Km Blues, by Daniel Esteves, Wanderson de Souza and Wagner de Souza
- 2014: O Monstro, by Fabio Coala
- 2015: Quaisqualigundum, by Davi Calil and Roger Cruz
- 2016: Uma Aventura de Verne & Mauá – Mil Léguas Transamazônicas, by Will and Spacca
- 2017: The Hype, by Marcel Ibaldo and Max Andrade
- 2018: Alho-Poró, by Bianca Pinheiro
- 2019: Os Últimos Dias do Xerife, by Thiago Ossostortos
- 2020: Último Assalto, by Daniel Esteves and Alex Rodrigues

=== Best independent sole publication ===
- 2008: Menino Caranguejo #1, by Chicolam
- 2009: Nanquim Descartável, by Daniel Esteves
- 2010: Nanquim Descartável, by Daniel Esteves
- 2011: O Cabra, by Flávio Luiz
- 2012: Birds, by Gustavo Duarte
- 2013: Quadrinhos A2 – segunda temporada, by Cristina Eiko and Paulo Crumbim
- 2014: Beijo Adolescente 2, by Rafael Coutinho
- 2015: Edgar 1, by Gustavo Borges
- 2016: Beco do Rosário, by Ana Luiza Koehler
- 2017: Opala 76, by Eduardo Ferigato
- 2018: Alho-Poró, by Bianca Pinheiro
- 2019: Histórias Tristes e Piadas Ruins, by Laura Athayde
- 2020: São Francisco, by Gabriela Güllich and João Velozo

=== Best miniseries publication ===
This category was merged from "Best National Miniseries" and "Best Foreign Miniseries"; and, until 2016, this category was called "Best Miniseries".

- 2004: Ronin, by Frank Miller (Opera Graphica)
- 2005: 1602 (Marvel 1602), by Neil Gaiman and Andy Kubert (Panini)
- 2006: Superman – identidade secreta (Superman: Secret Identity), by Kurt Busiek and Stuart Immonen (Panini)
- 2007: Adolf (Adolf ni Tsugu), by Osamu Tezuka (Conrad)
- 2008: Fábulas – 1001 noites (1001 Nights of Snowfall), by Bill Willingham and many pencillers (Pixel)
- 2016: Ditadura no Ar No. 4, by Raphael Fernandes and Abel (independent) / Pátria Armada # 1, 2, by Klebs Júnior (Impulso HQ)
- 2017: Quack – Volume 3, by Kaji Pato (Draco)
- 2018: Xampu, by Roger Cruz (Panini)
- 2019: Greg – o contador de histórias, by Marcio R. Gotland (Náutilo HQ)
- 2020: Akira 6, by Katsuhiro Otomo (JBC)

=== Best mix publication ===
Until 2003, this category was called "Best Mix Comic Book".

- 1989: Animal (VHD Diffusion)
- 1990: Animal (VHD Diffusion)
- 1991: Animal (VHD Diffusion)
- 1992: Mil Perigos(Dealer)
- 1994: Graphic Rock #1: John Lennon – tributo (Nova Sampa)
- 1995: Lúcifer (Circo)
- 1996: Lúcifer (Circo)
- 1997: Heavy Metal (Heavy Metal)
- 1998: Metal Pesado – tudo em quadrinhos (Metal Pesado)
- 1999: Cybercomix (Bookmakers)
- 2000: Graffiti 76% Quadrinhos (independent)
- 2001: Canalha (Brainstore)
- 2002: Front (Via Lettera)
- 2003: Front (Via Lettera)
- 2004: Front (Via Lettera)
- 2005: Mosh! (independent)
- 2006: Mosh! (independent)
- 2007: Front No. 17 (Via Lettera)
- 2008: Pixel Magazine (Pixel)
- 2009: Graffiti 76% Quadrinhos nº 18 (independent)
- 2010: MSP 50 – Mauricio de Sousa por 50 artistas (Panini)
- 2011: MSP +50 – Mauricio de Sousa por mais 50 artistas (Panini)
- 2012: MSP Novos 50 – Mauricio de Sousa por 50 novos artistas (Panini)
- 2013: Creepy – Contos Clássicos de Terror – Volume Um (Devir)
- 2014: Friquinique (independent)
- 2015: Gibi Quântico (independent)
- 2016: O Rei Amarelo em quadrinhos (Draco)
- 2017: O Despertar de Cthulhu em Quadrinhos (Draco)
- 2018: Baiacu (Todavia) / Marcatti 40 (Ugra Press)
- 2019: Gibi de Menininha (Zarabatana)
- 2020: Mulheres & Quadrinhos, by Dani Marino and Laluña Machado (Skript)

=== Best national comic strip ===
- 1989: Geraldão, by Glauco
- 1990: Níquel Náusea, by Fernando Gonsales
- 1991: Níquel Náusea, by Fernando Gonsales
- 1992: Níquel Náusea, by Fernando Gonsales
- 1993: Los Três Amigos, by Angeli, Glauco and Laerte
- 1994: Níquel Náusea, by Fernando Gonsales
- 1995: Níquel Náusea, by Fernando Gonsales
- 1996: Família Brasil, by Luis Fernando Verissimo
- 1997: Níquel Náusea, by Fernando Gonsales
- 1998: Striptiras, by Laerte
- 1999: Piratas do Tietê, by Laerte
- 2000: Aline, by Adão Iturrusgarai
- 2001: Aline, by Adão Iturrusgarai
- 2002: Níquel Náusea, by Fernando Gonsales
- 2003: Piratas do Tietê, by Laerte
- 2004: Níquel Náusea, by Fernando Gonsales
- 2005: Piratas do Tietê and Striptiras, by Laerte
- 2006: Piratas do Tietê, by Laerte
- 2007: Piratas do Tietê, by Laerte
- 2008: Níquel Náusea, by Fernando Gonsales
- 2009: Níquel Náusea, by Fernando Gonsales
- 2010: Malvados, by André Dahmer
- 2011: Piratas do Tietê, by Laerte
- 2012: Manual do Minotauro, by Laerte
- 2013: Níquel Náusea, by Fernando Gonsales
- 2014: Manual do Minotauro, by Laerte
- 2015: Malvados, by André Dahmer

=== Best national graphic novel ===
- 1992: Graphic Dealer #1: Transubstanciação, by Lourenço Mutarelli (Dealer)
- 1993: Graphic Dealer #2: O negócio do Sertão – como descolar uma grana no séc. XVII, by André Toral (Dealer)
- 1994: Desgraçados, by Lourenço Mutarelli (Vidente)
- 1995: Mulher-Diaba no rastro de Lampião, by Ataíde Braz and Flavio Colin (Sampa)
- 1996: À meia-noite levarei sua alma, by José Mojica Marins and Laudo Ferreira Jr. (Sampa)
- 1997: O Vira-Lata, by Paulo Garfunkel and Líbero Malavoglia (Paladinos de Onan)
- 1998: O Vira-Lata, by Paulo Garfunkel and Líbero Malavoglia (Paladinos de Onan)
- 1999: Lampião – era o cavalo do tempo atrás da besta da vida, by Klévisson Viana (Hedra)
- 2000: A estranha turma do Zé do Caixão, by Alexandre Montandon and Alexandre Dias (Brainstore)
- 2001: Fawcett, by André Diniz and Flavio Colin (Nona Arte)
- 2002: Estórias Gerais, by Wellington Srbek and Flavio Colin (Conrad)
- 2003: Fantasmagoriana, by Wellington Srbek and Flavio Colin (independent)

=== Best national miniseries ===
- 1999: Lua dos dragões, by Marcelo Cassaro and André Vazzios (Trama)
- 2001: Combo Rangers Revolution, by Fabio Yabu and Ulisses Pérez (JBC)
- 2002: Pindorama – a outra história do Brasil, by Lailson de Holanda Cavalcanti (Diário de Pernambuco)

=== Best national special edition ===
- 2004: A moça que namorou com o bode, by Klévisson Viana (Tupynanquim / Coqueiro)
- 2005: 10 Pãezinhos – crítica, by Fábio Moon and Gabriel Bá (Devir)
- 2006: Santô e os pais da aviação, by Spacca (Cia. das Letras)
- 2007: 10 Pãezinhos – mesa para dois, by Fábio Moon and Gabriel Bá (Devir)
- 2008: Laertevisão – coisas que não esqueci, by Laerte (Conrad)
- 2009: Mesmo Delivery, by Rafael Grampá (Desiderata)
- 2010: MSP 50 – Mauricio de Sousa por 50 artistas, by many authors (Panini)
- 2011: Bando de dois, by Danilo Beyruth (Zarabatana)
- 2012: Morro da Favela, by André Diniz (Leya/Barba Negra)
- 2013: Astronauta - Magnetar, by Danilo Beyruth (Panini)
- 2014: Turma da Mônica - Laços, by Vitor Cafaggi and Lu Cafaggi (Panini)
- 2015: A Vida de Jonas, by Magno Costa (Zarabatana)
- 2016: La Dansarina, by Lillo Parra and Jefferson Costa (Quadro a Quadro)
- 2017: Yeshuah – Absoluto, by Laudo Ferreira (Devir)
- 2018: Angola Janga, by Marcelo D'Salete (Veneta)
- 2019: Jeremias – Pele, by Rafael Calça and Jefferson Costa (Panini)
- 2020: Roseira, Medalha e Engenho, by Jefferson Costa (Pipoca & Nanquim)

=== Best prozine ===
- 2005: Putzgrila
- 2006: Areia Hostil, by Lorde Lobo, editor
- 2007: A mosca no copo de vidro e outras histórias

=== Best serial comic book ===
- 1992: Akira, by Katsuhiro Otomo (Globo)
- 1993: Liga da Justiça, by many authors (Abril Jovem)
- 1994: Sandman, by Neil Gaiman and many pencillers (Globo)
- 1995: Sandman, by Neil Gaiman and many pencillers (Globo)
- 1996: Vertigo, by many authors (Abril Jovem)
- 1997: Gen^{13}, by Jim Lee, Brandon Choi and J. Scott Campbell (Globo)
- 1998: Spawn, by Todd McFarlane (Abril Jovem)
- 1999: Preacher, by Garth Ennis and Steve Dillon (Metal Pesado)
- 2000: Spawn, by Todd McFarlane (Abril Jovem)
- 2001: Dragon Ball, by Akira Toriyama (Conrad)
- 2002: Holy Avenger, by Marcelo Cassaro and Erica Awano (Trama)
- 2003: Holy Avenger, by Marcelo Cassaro and Erica Awano (Talismã)

=== Best special edition ===
From 2004, this category was split into National and Foreign Special Editions.

- 1989: Anos de ouro do Pato Donald, by many authors (Abril Jovem)
- 1990: Batman – ano um (Batman: Year One), by Frank Miller and David Mazzucchelli (Abril Jovem)
- 1991: Lex Luthor – biografia não-autorizada (Lex Luthor: The Unauthorized Biography), by James D. Hudnall and Eduardo Barreto (Abril Jovem)
- 1992: Asilo Arkham – uma séria casa num sério mundo (Arkham Asylum: A Serious House on Serious Earth), by Grant Morrison and Dave McKean (Abril Jovem)
- 1993: A arte de Rodolfo Zalla, by Rodolfo Zalla (D-Arte)
- 1994: Fumetti – o melhor dos quadrinhos italianos, by many authors (Globo)
- 1995: Pato Donald – 60 Anos, by may authors (Abril Jovem)
- 1996: Batman #1: Batman – a queda do morcego – a vitória de Bane (Batman: Knightfall: Broken Bat), by many authors (Abril Jovem)
- 1997: Almanaque do Faroeste (Almanacco del West 1996), by Claudio Nizzi and Andrea Venturi (Globo)
- 1998: Metal Pesado – tudo em quadrinhos – edição comemorativa – 15 Anos Gibiteca de Curitiba, by many authors (Metal Pesado)
- 1999: Linha de ataque – futebol arte, by many authors (Abril Jovem)
- 2000: Super-Homem – paz na Terra (Superman: Peace on Earth), by Alex Ross and Paul Dini (Abril Jovem)
- 2001: Restolhada, by Marcatti (Opera Graphica)
- 2002: Saino a percurá, by Lelis (independent)
- 2003: Filho do urso e outras histórias, by Flavio Colin (Opera Graphica)

=== Best theoretical book ===
- 1989: Esses incríveis heróis de papel, by Ionaldo Cavalcanti (Mater)
- 1990: Ecad, cadê o meu? – uma bem humorada cartilha sobre o direito autoral na música popular, by José Carlos Costa Netto and Paulo Caruso (Mil Folhas)
- 1991: Quadrinhos e arte seqüencial (Comics and Sequential Art), by Will Eisner (Martins Fontes)
- 1992: Mangá – o poder dos quadrinhos japoneses, by Sonia Bibe Buyten (Hedra)
- 1994: O que é fanzine, by Henrique Magalhães (Brasiliense)
- 1995: História da história em quadrinhos, by Álvaro de Moya (Brasiliense)
- 1996: Desvendando os quadrinhos (Understanding Comics), by Scott McCloud (Makron Books)
- 1997: O mundo de Walt Disney, by Álvaro de Moya (Geração)
- 1998: Feras do humor baiano, by Gutenberg Cruz (Empresa Gráfica da Bahia) / Humor diário – a ilustração humorística do Diário de Pernambucano (1914–1996), by Lailson de Holanda Cavalcanti (UFPE)
- 1999: O Rio de J. Carlos, by Zuenir Ventura and Cássio Loredano (Lacerda / Prefeitura do Rio de Janeiro)
- 2000: História (nem sempre) bem-humorada de Pernambuco – 140 caricaturas do século XIX – volume 1, by Graça Ataíde and Rosário Andrade (Bagaço)
- 2002: Quadrinhos, sedução e paixão, by Moacy Cirne (Vozes)
- 2003: Tá rindo do quê? – um mergulho nos Salões de Humor de Piracicaba, by Camilo Riani (Unimep)
- 2004: Vapt! Vupt!, by Álvaro de Moya (Clemente Guarani)
- 2005: A Guerra dos Gibis – a formação do mercado editorial brasileiro e a censura aos quadrinhos, 1933–1964, by Gonçalo Junior (Companhia das Letras)
- 2006: Narrativas gráficas (Graphic Storytelling and Visual Narrative), by Will Eisner (Devir)
- 2007: O Tico-Tico – centenário da primeira revista de quadrinhos do Brasil, by Waldomiro Vergueiro and Roberto Elísio dos Santos, organizers (Opera Graphica)
- 2008: Desenhando quadrinhos (Making Comics), by Scott McCloud (M. Books)
- 2009: Henfil – o humor subversivo, by Márcio Malta (Expressão Popular)
- 2010: A leitura dos quadrinhos, by Paulo Ramos (Contexto)
- 2011: Bienvenido – um passeio pelos quadrinhos argentinos, by Paulo Ramos (Zarabatana)
- 2012: Angelo Agostini – a imprensa ilustrada da Corte à Capital Federal, 1864–1910, by Gilberto Marangoni (Devir)
- 2013: E Benício criou a mulher, by Gonçalo Junior (Opera Graphica)
- 2014: Marvel Comics – A história secreta (Marvel Comics: The Untold Story), by Sean Howe (Leya Brasil)
- 2015: Humor Paulistano – A Experiência da Circo Editorial, 1984–1995, by Toninho Mendes (Sesi-SP Editora)
- 2016: Imageria – O nascimento das histórias em quadrinhos, by Rogério de Campos (Veneta)
- 2017: 1973, Quando Tudo Começou! – História do 1º Salão Brasileiro de Humor e Quadrinhos, by many authors (independent)
- 2018: Desaplanar (Unflattening), by Nick Sousanis (Veneta)
- 2019: Tradução de Histórias em Quadrinhos, by Carol Pimentel (Transitiva)
- 2020: Mulheres & Quadrinhos, by Dani Marino and Laluña Machado (Skript)

=== Best webcomic ===
Until 2007, this category was called "Best Comics' Website".

- 1998: Gibindex
- 1999: Cybercomix, by many authors
- 2000: Cybercomix, by many authors
- 2001: Cybercomix, by many authors
- 2002: Nona Arte, by André Diniz, editor
- 2003: Nona Arte, by André Diniz, editor
- 2004: Nona Arte, by André Diniz, editor
- 2005: Nona Arte, by André Diniz, editor
- 2006: Nona Arte, by André Diniz, editor
- 2007: Mundo Canibal
- 2008: Malvados, by André Dahmer
- 2009: Quadrinhos ordinários, by Rafael Sica
- 2010: Dinamite & Raio-Laser, by Samuel Fonseca
- 2011: Linha do Trem, by Raphael Salimena
- 2012: Terapia, by Rob Gordon, Marina Kurcis and Mario Cau
- 2013: Feira da Fruta, by many authors
- 2014: Terapia, by Rob Gordon, Marina Kurcis and Mario Cau
- 2015: Beladona, by Ana Recalde and Denis Mello
- 2016: Quadrinhos Ácidos, by Pedro Leite
- 2017: As Empoderadas, by Germana Viana
- 2018: Hell No! Meu pai é o diabo, by Leo Finocchi
- 2019: Bendita Cura, by Mário César
- 2020: Bendita Cura, by Mário César

=== Best webcomic strip ===
- 2012: Um Sábado Qualquer, by Carlos Ruas
- 2013: Vida Besta, by Galvão
- 2014: Overdose Homeopática, by Marco Oliveira
- 2015: Will Tirando, by Will Leite
- 2016: Ryot IRAS, by Ryot
- 2017: Linha do Trem, by Raphael Salimena
- 2018: Will Tirando, by Will Leite
- 2010: Will Tirando, by Will Leite
- 2020: Tirinhas do Silva João, by Silva João

=== Best western comic book ===
- 1989: Ken Parker, by Giancarlo Berardi and Ivo Milazzo

=== Best youth publication ===
- 2016: Turma da Mônica: Lições, by Vitor Cafaggi and Lu Cafaggi (Panini)
- 2017: Mônica: Força, by Bianca Pinheiro (Panini)
- 2018: Chico Bento: Arvorada, by Orlandeli (Panini)
- 2019: Jeremias: Pele, by Rafael Calça and Jefferson Costa (Panini)
- 2020: Tina: Respeito, by Fefê Torquato (Panini)

=== Special manga ===
- 2016: Quack – Patadas Voadoras, by Kaji Pato (Draco)

== Academic ==
=== Best doctoral thesis ===
- 2007: As histórias em quadrinhos como informação imagética integrada ao ensino universitário, by Gazy Andraus (USP)
- 2008: O fato gráfico: o humor gráfico como gênero jornalístico, by Jorge Arbach (USP)
- 2009: O potencial das histórias em quadrinhos na formação de leitores: busca de um contraponto entre os panoramas culturais brasileiro e europeu, by Valéria Aparecida Bari (USP)
- 2011: Arquitetura e urbanismo, por Quem não chora não mama! – panorama do design gráfico brasileiro através do humor 1837–1931, by José Mendes André (USP)
- 2013: Comunicando a cidade em quadrinhos: do narrar ao fabular nos romances gráficos de Will Eisner, by Marília Santana Borges (PUC-SP)
- 2014: O reencantamento do mundo em quadrinhos: Uma análise de Promethea, de Alan Moore e J. H. Wiliams III, by Carlos Manoel de Hollanda Cavalcanti (UFRJ)
- 2015: Sindicalismo, Piratas e Cabelo Chanel: leituras e reciclagem cultural em obras, by Cláudio José Meneses de Oliveira (UFBA)
- 2016: Os Sentidos dos Quadrinhos em Contexto Nacional-Popular (Brasil e Chile, Anos 1960 e 1970), by Ivan Gomes (UFF)
- 2017: Caricatas: Arte-Rostohumor-Experiência, by Camilo Riani (Unesp)
- 2018: Tecnologia e cultura nos quadrinhos independentes brasileiros, by Líber Eugenio Paz (UTFPR)
- 2019: A escola no túnel do tempo: imaginários sociodiscursivos e efeitos de sentido em charges contemporâneas sobre a educação e ontem e de hoje, by Eveline Coelho Cardoso (UFF)
- 2020: Quadrinhos no Rio Grande do Sul: Um Momento Decisivo – O Humor Gráfico em Debate & As Produções de Sampaulo, Santiago e Edgar Vasques na Formação de um Polissistema, by Vinicius da Silva Rodrigues (UFRGS)

=== Best graduation academic work ===
- 2007: HQ: a nona arte, by Daniela de Andrade Santana, Janaina Guimarães Monteiro, Priscila Sodré Portilho da Silva and Vivian Lima Conesa (Anhembi)
- 2008: Na Bodega, Colóquio Ilustrado, by Gil Tókio (USP)
- 2009: A quarta dimensão do trabalho de Breccia, by Pedro Franz Broering (UFSC)
- 2010: As Histórias em quadrinhos e o cinema: as artes irmãs, by Adriano Di Benedetto (USP)
- 2011: Letras, por Quixote de Cerveisner – estudo comparativo entre o capítulo VIII do Quixote de Cervantes e sua adaptação para os quadrinhos por Will Eisner, by Leonardo Poglia Vidal (Unisinos)
- 2012: Traços e rabiscos nos anos 80 – o trabalho de Henfil na década da transição, by Fernanda de Alcântara Pestana and Luciana Fernandes dos Reis (Cásper Líbero)
- 2013: Jean Monteiro
- 2014: A trajetória de Kamui Shirou: a representação da sociedade japonesa refletida nos mangás, by Luiz Henrique Bezerra (PUC-PR)
- 2015: Histórias em quadrinhos online: a prototipagem da webcomic "Frankestino", by Maria Fernanda Milão Fuscaldo (PUC-RS)
- 2016: 'A representação da Segunda Guerra Mundial em Alguns Quadrinhos Japoneses, by Renan Suchmacher (UFRJ)
- 2017: Web Série Vozes e Traços O Novo Cenário Brasileiro de HQs, by Bruna Penilhas, Daniel Generalli, Juliana Frezarin and Lucas Alencar (Umesp)
- 2018: Naruna – Uma história sobre esculpir travessias, by Mayara Lista Alcantara (UFRJ)
- 2019: Webcomics dos Átomos aos bits, by Cicero Henrique da Cruz Sampaio (Universidade Regional do Cariri)
- 2020: Quadrinhos e Matemática: Algumas Possíveis Construções Usando a Imaginação, by Leandro Carlos Blum (UFRGS)

=== Best masters dissertation ===
- 2007: O ensino da arte e produção de histórias em quadrinhos no ensino fundamental, by João Marcos Parreira Mendonça (UFMG)
- 2008: O desenho moderno de Saul Steinberg: obra e contexto, by Daniel Bueno (USP)
- 2009: Considerações sobre sociedade e tecnologia a partir da poética e linguagem dos quadrinhos de Lourenço Mutarelli no período de 1988 a 2006, by Líber Eugenio Paz (UTFPR)
- 2010: Histórias em quadrinhos e o ensino de ciências nas séries iniciais: estabelecendo relações para o ensino de conteúdos curriculares procedimentais, by Mariana Vaitiekunas Pizarro (Unesp)
- 2011: Suehiro Maruo: o sublime e o abjeto como estética da existência, by Marcia Casturino (EBA-UFRJ)
- 2012: Entre a épica e a paródia: a (des)mistificação do gaucho nos quadrinhos de Inodoro Pereyra, el renegáu, by Priscila Pereira (Unicamp)
- 2013: Educação para Abolição: charges e histórias em quadrinhos no Segundo Reinado, by Thiago Vasconcellos Modenesi (UFPE)
- 2014: Entre álbum e leitor: traços da vida comum e do homem ordinário no movimento da nouvelle mangá, by Tiago Canário (UFBA)
- 2015: Ela não pode ser assim tão fofa! Apropriação e circulação de mangás Lolicon, by Natália Marques Cavalcante de Oliveira (UFSC)
- 2016: Falando de Quadrinhos: A Influência do Letreiramento nas Histórias em Quadrinhos, by Marjorie Yamada (UnB)
- 2017: Tudo o que o cidadão deve saber: As Cartilhas e o Processo Civilizador, by Miguel Geraldo Mendes Reis (PUC-Rio)
- 2018: O Processo de legitimação cultural das histórias em quadrinhos, by Beatriz Sequeira de Carvalho (USP)
- 2019: Batman e o Surrealismo: uma investigação das estratégias poéticas surrealista dentro do Asilo Arkham, by Valter do Carmo Moreira (UEL)
- 2020: O Tempo Multidimensional nos Quadrinhos: Um Estudo das Estratégias Narrativas em Here, de Richard McGuire, by Cátia Ana Baldoíno da Silva (UFG)

=== Best research ===
From 2007 this category was split into "Best Doctoral Thesis", "Best Graduation Academic Work" and "Best Masters Dissertation".

- 1989: O poder de difusão das histórias em quadrinhos japonesas como reflexo da sociedade nipônica, by Sonia Luyten (USP)
- 1997: A incrível guerra dos gibis, by Gonçalo Junior
- 1998: Phenix, by Wagner Augusto
- 2002: Uma história do Brasil através da caricatura: 1840–2001, by Renato Lemos, organizer (Bom Texto / Letras & Expressões)
- 2004: O Tico-Tico: um marco nas histórias em quadrinhos no Brasil (1905–1962), by Maria Cristina Merlo (USP)
- 2005: A escrita plástica, desenho, pensamento e conhecimento, by Luiz Gê (USP)
- 2006: Humor e populismo: o desafio diário nas charges de Nelo Lorenzon (1948–1960), by Andréa Araújo Nogueira (USP)

== Others ==
=== Best animated cartoon ===
- 1995: Liquid Television, by Japhet Asher
- 1996: The Maxx, by Sam Kieth and Bill Messner-Loebs
- 1997: Cassiopéia, by Clóvis Viera, director
- 1998: A vida moderna de Rocko (Rocko's Modern Life), by Joe Murray
- 1999: KaBlam!, by Robert Mittenthal, Will McRobb and Chris Viscardi

=== Best animated cartoon (feature film) ===
- 2000: Toy Story 2, by John Lasseter, director
- 2001: A fuga das galinhas (Chicken Run), by Peter Lord and Nick Park
- 2002: Shrek, by Andrew Adamson and Vicky Jenson, directors
- 2003: A era do gelo (Ice Age), by Chris Wedge and Carlos Saldanha

=== Best animated cartoon (short film) ===
- 2000: Deus é Pai, by Allan Sieber
- 2001: Os idiotas mesmo, by Allan Sieber
- 2002: For the birds, by Ralph Eggleston, director

=== Best animated cartoon for TV ===
- 2000: O laboratório de Dexter (Dexter's Laboratory), by Genndy Tartakovsky
- 2001: Rugrats, by Arlene Klasky, Gábor Csupó and Paul Germain
- 2002: Bob Esponja Calça Quadrada (SpongeBob SquarePants), by Stephen Hillenburg
- 2003: Bob Esponja Calça Quadrada (SpongeBob SquarePants), by Stephen Hillenburg

=== Best animation ===
- 2005: A Liga dos VJs Paladinos, by Marco Pavão
- 2006: Cartoon Network Brasil's national vignettes, by many authors
- 2007: Wood & Stock: Sexo, Orégano e Rock'n'Roll, by Otto Guerra
- 2008: Uma Aventura no Tempo, by Mauricio de Sousa

=== Best author's website ===
- 2004: Vida Besta, by Galvão
- 2005: Vida Besta, by Galvão
- 2006: O mundo maravilhoso de Adão Iturrusgarai, by Adão Iturrusgarai
- 2007: Samuel Casal – ilustrador, by Samuel Casal
- 2008: Quadrinhofilia, by José Aguiar

=== Best blog / flog of graphic artist ===
- 2004: Os Loucos Underground, by Fábio Moon and Gabriel Bá
- 2005: Os Loucos Underground, by Fábio Moon and Gabriel Bá
- 2006: Os Loucos Underground, by Fábio Moon and Gabriel Bá
- 2007: Os Loucos Underground, by Fábio Moon and Gabriel Bá
- 2008: Furry Water, by Rafael Grampá

=== Best blog about comics ===
- 2008: Blog dos Quadrinhos

=== Best comic store ===
- 1989: Livraria Muito Prazer
- 1990: Livraria Muito Prazer
- 1997: Livraria Muito Prazer
- 1998: Itiban Comic Shop
- 1999: Merlin Comic Store
- 2000: Devir Livraria

=== Best event ===
- 2004: Festival Internacional de Quadrinhos
- 2005: Ilustra Brasil
- 2006: Festival Internacional de Quadrinhos
- 2007: Ilustra Brasil
- 2008: Festival Internacional de Quadrinhos
- 2009: Bistecão Ilustrado
- 2010: Festival Internacional de Quadrinhos
- 2011: Rio Comicon
- 2012: Festival Internacional de Quadrinhos
- 2013: Gibicon
- 2014: Festival Internacional de Quadrinhos
- 2015: Comic Con Experience
- 2016: Comic Con Experience
- 2017: Comic Con Experience
- 2018: Comic Con Experience
- 2019: Comic Con Experience
- 2020: Butantã Gibicon

=== Best exhibition ===
- 1989: Arquitetura em quadrinhos (São Paulo Museum of Art)
- 1990: Alain Voss (Museu da Imagem e do Som)
- 1998: Sem AIDS com amor (Bienal Internacional de Humor)
- 1999: Salão Internacional de Piracicaba (Engenho Central)
- 2000: Angeli, o Matador (Festival Internacional de Quadrinhos)
- 2001: Humores nunca dantes navegados – o descobrimento segundo os cartunistas do Sul do Brasil (São Pedro Theatre)
- 2002: História em Quadrões
- 2003: Laerte por Laerte (Museu de Artes Gráficas)
- 2004: Mozart Couto (Festival Internacional de Quadrinhos)
- 2005: São Paulo por Paulo Caruso – um olhar bem-humorado sobre esta cidade
- 2006: Henfil do Brasil (Centro Cultural Banco do Brasil)
- 2007: A história do futebol no Brasil através da charge (Sesc Ipiranga)
- 2008: Ziraldo – o eterno Menino Maluquinho (Salão Carioca)
- 2009: Angeli/Genial (Festival Internacional de Humor do Rio de Janeiro)
- 2010: Batman 70 Anos (Festival Internacional de Quadrinhos)
- 2011: Zeróis – Ziraldo na tela grande (Centro Cultural Banco do Brasil)
- 2012: Criando Quadrinhos – da ideia à página impressa (Festival Internacional de Quadrinhos)
- 2013: Ocupação Angeli (Itaú Cultural)
- 2014: Ícones dos Quadrinhos (Festival Internacional de Quadrinhos)
- 2015: Ocupação Laerte (Itaú Cultural)
- 2016: Exposição Beco do Rosário (Galeria Hipotética)
- 2017: Ocupação Glauco (Itaú Cultural)
- 2018: A Era Heroica – O Universo DC Comics por Ivan Reis (Victor Civita Latin American Library)
- 2019: Quadrinhos (São Paulo Museum of Image and Sound)
- 2020: Angola Janga de Marcelo D'Salette Em Angola/Moçambique

=== Best graphic finishing ===
- 1989: Martins Fontes
- 1990: Martins Fontes

=== Best licensing character ===
- 1998: Senninha
- 1999: Vida de Inseto (A Bug's Life)
- 2000: Pokémon

=== Best licensing company ===
- 1998: Character
- 1999: Character
- 2000: ITC
- 2001: Nintendo

=== Best licensing product ===
- 1998: Tazos
- 1999: Mamíferos Parmalat
- 2000: Elma Chips' Mini-cards Pokémon
- 2001: Guaraná Caçulinha – Pokémon

=== Best media about comics ===
This category was merged from "Best Blog About Comics", "Best Publication About Comics" and "Best Website About Comics".

- 2009: Blog dos Quadrinhos
- 2010: Universo HQ
- 2011: Universo HQ
- 2012: Mundo dos Super-Heróis

=== Best new project ===
- 1998: Videogibi Turma da Mônica – O Mônico

=== Best newspaper supplement for children ===
- 1989: O Globinho
- 1990: O Globinho

=== Best production for other medias ===
This category was also called: "Best Adaptation to Another Vehicle" (1989–2010), "Best Production in Other Medias" (2011–2015) and "Best Adaptation to Another Media" (2016).

- 1989: Cáspite, by Sylvio Pinheiro, producer (radio program)
- 1993: Banana Stickers, by Angeli (sticker album)
- 1995: Batman – a série animada (Batman: The Animated Series), by Bruce Timm, creator (animated series)
- 1996: Rê Bordosa, o Ocaso de uma Doida, by Betty Erthal and Angeli, writers (theatre)
- 1997: O cavaleiro da tristíssima figura, by Jorge Miguel Marinho (book)
- 1998: HQ CD (CD-ROM)
- 1999: Spawn (animated series)
- 2000: Will Eisner – profissão cartunista, by Marisa Furtado, director (documentary)
- 2001: X-Men – o filme (X-Men), by Bryan Singer, director (movie)
- 2002: Gorillaz (music)
- 2003: Homem-Aranha (Spider-Man), by Sam Raimi, director (movie)
- 2004: X-Men 2 – o filme (X2), by Bryan Singer, director (movie)
- 2005: Homem-Aranha 2 (Spider-Man 2), by Sam Raimi, director (movie)
- 2006: Sin City – a cidade do pecado (Sin City), by Robert Rodriguez and Frank Miller, directors (movie)
- 2007: Wood & Stock: Sexo, Orégano e Rock'n'Roll, by Otto Guerra, director (animation)
- 2008: 300, by Zack Snyder, director (movie)
- 2009: Batman – o cavaleiro das trevas (The Dark Knight), by Christopher Nolan, director (movie)
- 2010: Los 3 Amigos, by Daniel Messias, director (animation short film)
- 2011: Malditos Cartunistas, by Daniel Garcia and Daniel Paiva (documentary)
- 2012: Angeli 24 Horas, by Beth Formaggini (documentary)
- 2013: Malditos Cartunistas, by Daniel Garcia and Daniel Paiva (TV series)
- 2014: Cena HQ (theatre)
- 2015: Cena HQ (theatre)
- 2016: Cena HQ (theatre)
- 2017: Cena HQ (theatre)
- 2018: Traço Livre – O Quadrinho Independente no Brasil (documentary)
- 2019: Em Foco – Salão Internacional de Humor de Piracicaba (documentary)
- 2020: Monica and Friends: Bonds (movie)

=== Best publication about comics ===
Until 2003, this category was called "Best Magazine About Comics".

- 1997: Wizard (Note: The awards given to Wizard refer to the magazine's Brazilian edition.) (Globo)
- 1998: Wizard (Globo)
- 1999: General Visão (Acme)
- 2000: Herói (Conrad)
- 2001: Herói 2000 (Conrad)
- 2002: Herói.com.br (Conrad)
- 2003: Herói.com.br (Conrad)
- 2004: Wizard (Panini)
- 2005: Wizard (Panini)
- 2006: Wizard (Panini)
- 2007: Mundo dos Super-heróis (Europa)
- 2008: Mundo dos Super-heróis (Europa)

=== Best salon and festival ===
- 2000: 1st Festival Internacional de Humor e Quadrinhos de Pernambuco
- 2002: 28th Salão Internacional de Humor de Piracicaba
- 2003: 4th Festival Internacional de Humor e Quadrinhos de Pernambuco
- 2004: 30th Salão Internacional de Humor de Piracicaba
- 2005: 6th Festival Internacional de Humor e Quadrinhos de Pernambuco
- 2006: 32nd Salão Internacional de Humor de Piracicaba
- 2007: 33rd Salão Internacional de Humor de Piracicaba
- 2008: 9th Festival Internacional de Humor e Quadrinhos de Pernambuco
- 2009: 1st Festival Internacional de Humor do Rio de Janeiro
- 2010: 2nd Festival Internacional de Humor do Rio de Janeiro
- 2011: 3rd Salão Internacional de Humor da Amazônia
- 2012: 3rd Festival Internacional de Humor do Rio de Janeiro
- 2013: 1st Salão Internacional de Humor Gráfico de Pernambuco
- 2014: 1st Bienal Internacional de Caricatura

=== Best sticker album ===
- 1996: X-Men (Abril Panini)
- 1997: Mamonas Assassinas (Panini)
- 1998: Castelo Rá-Tim-Bum (Multi Editora)
- 1999: Chiquititas (Panini)
- 2000: Pokémon
- 2001: Pokémon (Panini)
- 2002: Harry Potter (Panini)
- 2003: Sítio do Pica-pau Amarelo (Panini)

=== Best toy ===
- 1998: Spawn
- 1999: Spawn
- 2000: Star Wars Line
- 2001: Rugrats

=== Best video game ===
- 1999: Zelda 64

=== Best website about comics ===
- 1999: Area-51
- 2000: Planet Comics
- 2001: Universo HQ
- 2002: Universo HQ
- 2003: Universo HQ
- 2004: Universo HQ
- 2005: Universo HQ
- 2006: Universo HQ
- 2007: Universo HQ
- 2008: Universo HQ

=== Comic book fan - personality ===
- 2013: Danilo Gentili

=== Featured character ===
- 1989: Batman
- 1990: The Joker
- 1991: Sandman
- 1992: Sandman
- 1993: Sandman
- 1994: Superman
- 1995: The Spirit
- 1996: O Menino Maluquinho
- 1997: Spawn
- 1998: Overman
- 1999: Níquel Náusea
- 2000: Piratas do Tietê
- 2001: Aline
- 2002: Ken Parker / Diomedes
- 2003: Spider-Man

=== Largest print run ===
- 1989: Mônica (Globo)
- 1990: Mônica (Globo)

== Special awards ==
=== Great contribution ===
- 1989: Um Contrato com Deus (A Contract with God), by Will Eisner (Brasiliense)
- 1990: O Menino Quadradinho, by Ziraldo (Melhoramentos)
- 1991: Livraria Devir
- 1992: 1st Bienal Internacional de Quadrinhos
- 1993: Gibiteca Henfil
- 1994: 2nd Bienal Internacional de Quadrinhos
- 1995: I Comecom
- 1996: Comicmania
- 1997: Phenix
- 1998: 3rd Bienal Internacional de Quadrinhos
- 1999: Selecções BD
- 2000: Video about 30 years of O Pasquim
- 2001: Imago Days, artists' mailing list on the internet
- 2002: Paulo Caruso, for the restoration of the Ziraldo's mural in Canecão
- 2003: Inauguration of Museu de Artes Gráficas
- 2004: Exhibition A Comédia Urbana, de Honoré Daumier a Araújo Porto-Alegre
- 2005: Emília e a Turma do Sítio no Fome Zero (Globo)
- 2006: Gonçalo Jr., writer and comic book researcher
- 2007: Passos perdidos, história desenhada: a presença judaica em Pernambuco no Século XX, by Tânia Kaufman, Amaro Braga, Danielle Jaimes and Roberta Cirne (Arquivo Histórico Judaico de Pernambuco)
- 2008: Borba Gata (history drawn on the "body" of a mannequin), by Luiz Gê / Quarto Mundo, collective of independent comics / Guia do Ilustrador, by Ricardo Antunes
- 2009: Fnac / PNBE – Programa Nacional Biblioteca na Escola
- 2010: ProAc – Programa de Ação Cultural da Secretaria de Cultura do Estado de São Paulo
- 2011: Festa Literária Internacional de Paraty
- 2012: FanZines nas Zonas de Sampa
- 2013: História da caricatura brasileira, by Luciano Magno (Gala)
- 2014: Catarse
- 2015: ProAc – Programa de Ação Cultural (Secretaria de Cultura do Estado de São Paulo)
- 2016: Super-Heróis da Alegria
- 2017: HQ – Edição Especial (HBO) / Curso Básico de Histórias em Quadrinhos – Modalidade EAD (HQ Ceará)
- 2018: Creation of comic books' category in Prêmio Jabuti
- 2019: "Gibizão" da Turma da Mônica: Guinness World Records for biggest published comic book (Panini and MSP) / Coleção Grande Encontro Turma da Monica & Liga da Justiça (Panini, MSP and DC Comics)
- 2020: O Pasquim 50 Anosexhibition / National Library of Brazil's O Pasquim website

=== Great homage ===
Until 2015, this category was called "Special Homage".

- 1992: Editora D-Arte
- 1995: O Vira-Lata, by Paulo Garfunkel and Líbero Malavoglia (Paladinos de Onã)
- 1997: Jô Oliveira
- 1998: Flávio Colin / 15 years of Salão Internacional de Humor de Piracicaba
- 1999: 30 years of O Pasquim / 25 years of Ota in Mad
- 2000: Sonia Luyten
- 2001: Álvaro de Moya, for 50 years of the world's first comics exhibition
- 2002: Flávio Colin
- 2003: Marisa Furtado, from Scriptorium, who did the documentary Profissão Cartunista – Henfil / Ivan Consenza de Souza, Henfil's son
- 2004: Ziraldo, for the 50th anniversary of his career / Revista Balão, for 30 years of its release
- 2005: O Paulistano da Glória, by Xalberto, Bira Câmara and Sian (Via Lettera)
- 2007: Conceição Cahú
- 2008: Ivan Reis, for being named the best penciller of the year by the American edition of Wizard
- 2009: Fábio Moon and Gabriel Bá / Ziraldo
- 2010: Maria Ivete Araújo (Zetti), for her 30 years managing the Salão Internacional de Humor de Piracicaba
- 2011: Bar Tutti Giorni, frequented by Porto Alegre's graphic artists / Revista Ilustrar
- 2012: Mauro dos Prazeres / Achados e Perdidos, by Eduardo Damasceno, Luís Felipe Garrocho and Bruno Ito
- 2013: Ao mestre com carinho: Rodolfo Zalla, by Marcio Baraldi / Danilo Santos de Miranda / Os Zeróis, by Ziraldo (Globo)
- 2014: Memória Gráfica Brasileira – MGB
- 2015: Lilian Mitsunaga
- 2016: Alice Takeda (art director of Mauricio de Sousa Studios)
- 2017: 10 years of Guia dos Quadrinhos
- 2018: Douglas Quinta Reis / Sonia Luyten
- 2019: Aline Lemos, by the book Artistas Brasileiras / Edra, by the book Ao Mestre Com Carinho – Ziraldo 85 no traço de 85 talentosos Cartunistas
- 2020: Cada Passo Importa / Ivan Freitas da Costa / 20 years of Universo HQ

=== Great master ===
- 1990: Rodolfo Zalla
- 1991: Flávio Colin
- 1992: Carlos Zéfiro
- 1993: Ziraldo
- 1994: Eugênio Colonnese
- 1995: Júlio Shimamoto
- 1996: Cláudio Seto
- 1997: Walmir Amaral
- 1998: Miguel Penteado
- 1999: Mauricio de Sousa
- 2000: Getúlio Delfin
- 2001: Edmundo Rodrigues
- 2002: Gedeone Malagola
- 2003: Renato Canini
- 2004: Jô Oliveira
- 2005: Luiz Gê
- 2006: Ignácio Justo
- 2007: Sergio Macedo
- 2008: Ipê Nakashima / Fernando Ikoma / Paulo Fukue / Roberto Fukue / Minami Keizi
- 2009: Ciça / Zélio
- 2010: Laerte
- 2011: Paulo Caruso
- 2012: Marcatti
- 2013: Rubens Lucchetti
- 2014: Angeli
- 2015: Watson Portela
- 2016: Eva Furnari
- 2017: Luiz Saidenberg
- 2018: Daniel Azulay
- 2019: Carlos Edgard Herrero
- 2020: Miguel Paiva

=== International relevance ===
This category awards Brazilian artists who had his works published internationally. Until 2019, this category was called "International highlight".

- 2010: Ivan Reis
- 2011: Fábio Moon and Gabriel Bá
- 2012: Fábio Moon and Gabriel Bá
- 2013: André Diniz
- 2014: André Diniz, for Duas Luas
- 2015: André Diniz, for 7 Vidas
- 2016: Marcello Quintanilha, for Tungstênio and Talco de vidro
- 2017: Marcello Quintanilha
- 2018: Marcelo D'Salete
- 2019: Marcelo D'Salete, for Cumbe
- 2020: Sirlene Barbosa e João Pinheiro

=== Latin american highlight ===
- 2011: La Fiesta Pagana (Bolivia) , by many authors (La Rosca Cómics)
- 2012: Revista Fierro (Argentina) , by many authors (Página/12)
- 2013: En Dosis Diarias 2 (Chile) , by Alberto Montt (Ediciones B)
- 2014: El Viejo (Uruguay) , by Alceo Thrasyvoulou and Matías Bergara (Loco Rabia / Dragón Comics)

=== Portuguese language highlight ===
- 2013: Pontas Soltas – Cidades (Portugal) , by Ricardo Cabral (Edições Asa)
- 2014: Banda Desenhada da Língua Portuguesa – BDLP (Portugal) / (Angola) , by many authors (independent)

=== Publisher of the year ===
- 1989: Abril Jovem
- 1990: Abril Jovem
- 1991: Globo
- 1992: Record
- 1994: Globo / Devir
- 1995: Abril Jovem
- 1996: Abril Jovem
- 1997: Abril Jovem
- 1998: Metal Pesado
- 1999: Abril Jovem
- 2000: Via Lettera
- 2001: Conrad
- 2002: Conrad
- 2003: Nona Arte / Panini
- 2004: Conrad
- 2005: Devir
- 2006: Conrad
- 2007: Conrad
- 2008: Pixel
- 2009: Panini
- 2010: Quadrinhos na Cia
- 2011: Quadrinhos na Cia
- 2012: Leya/Barba Negra
- 2013: Nemo
- 2014: Nemo
- 2015: JBC / Veneta
- 2016: Mino
- 2017: SESI-SP Editora
- 2018: Pipoca & Nanquim
- 2019: Pipoca & Nanquim
- 2020: Pipoca & Nanquim

=== Valorization of comics ===
- 1989: Coleção Ver e Ler (Abril Jovem)
- 1990: O judaísmo para iniciantes (Le judaïsme pour débutants), by Charles Szlakmann (Brasiliense)
- 1993: Especial HQ (RTC)
- 1994: Sergio Bonelli
- 1995: Um Conto de Batman (Batman: Legends of the Dark Knight) (Abril Jovem)
- 1997: Festival Internacional de Banda Desenhada da Amadora / Comicmania
- 1998: Pacatatu
- 1999: Fábrica de Quadrinhos
- 2000: CLUQ
- 2001: São Vicente, a primeira sempre (project "500 anos de Brasil em Quadrinhos")
- 2002: Exhibition "História em Quadrões" (Mauricio de Sousa)
- 2003: As Aventuras de Nhô-Quim & Zé Caipora: os primeiros quadrinhos brasileiros 1869–1883, by Athos Eichler Cardoso, organizer (Senado Federal)
- 2006: 1st Salão Mackenzie de Humor (first Brazilian humor salon, in 1973 in Colégio Mackenzie)

== Winners by year ==
The year refers to the year the award was presented. The winners are based on production from the previous year.

- 1st Troféu HQ Mix (1989)
- 2nd Troféu HQ Mix (1990)
- 3rd Troféu HQ Mix (1991)
- 4th Troféu HQ Mix (1992)
- 5th Troféu HQ Mix (1993)
- 6th Troféu HQ Mix (1994)
- 7th Troféu HQ Mix (1995)
- 8th Troféu HQ Mix (1996)
- 9th Troféu HQ Mix (1997)
- 10th Troféu HQ Mix (1998)
- 11th Troféu HQ Mix (1999)
- 12th Troféu HQ Mix (2000)
- 13th Troféu HQ Mix (2001)
- 14th Troféu HQ Mix (2002)
- 15th Troféu HQ Mix (2003)
- 16th Troféu HQ Mix (2004)
- 17th Troféu HQ Mix (2005)
- 18th Troféu HQ Mix (2006)
- 19th Troféu HQ Mix (2007)
- 20th Troféu HQ Mix (2008)
- 21st Troféu HQ Mix (2009)
- 22nd Troféu HQ Mix (2010)
- 23rd Troféu HQ Mix (2011)
- 24th Troféu HQ Mix (2012)
- 25th Troféu HQ Mix (2013)
- 26th Troféu HQ Mix (2014)
- 27th Troféu HQ Mix (2015)
- 28th Troféu HQ Mix (2016)
- 29th Troféu HQ Mix (2017)
- 30th Troféu HQ Mix (2018)
- 31st Troféu HQ Mix (2019)
- 32nd Troféu HQ Mix (2020)
- 33rd Troféu HQ Mix (2021)
- 34th Troféu HQ Mix (2022)
- 35th Troféu HQ Mix (2023)
- 36th Troféu HQ Mix (2024)
- 37th Troféu HQ Mix (2025)
