= Marcello Quintanilha =

Brazilian comics artist

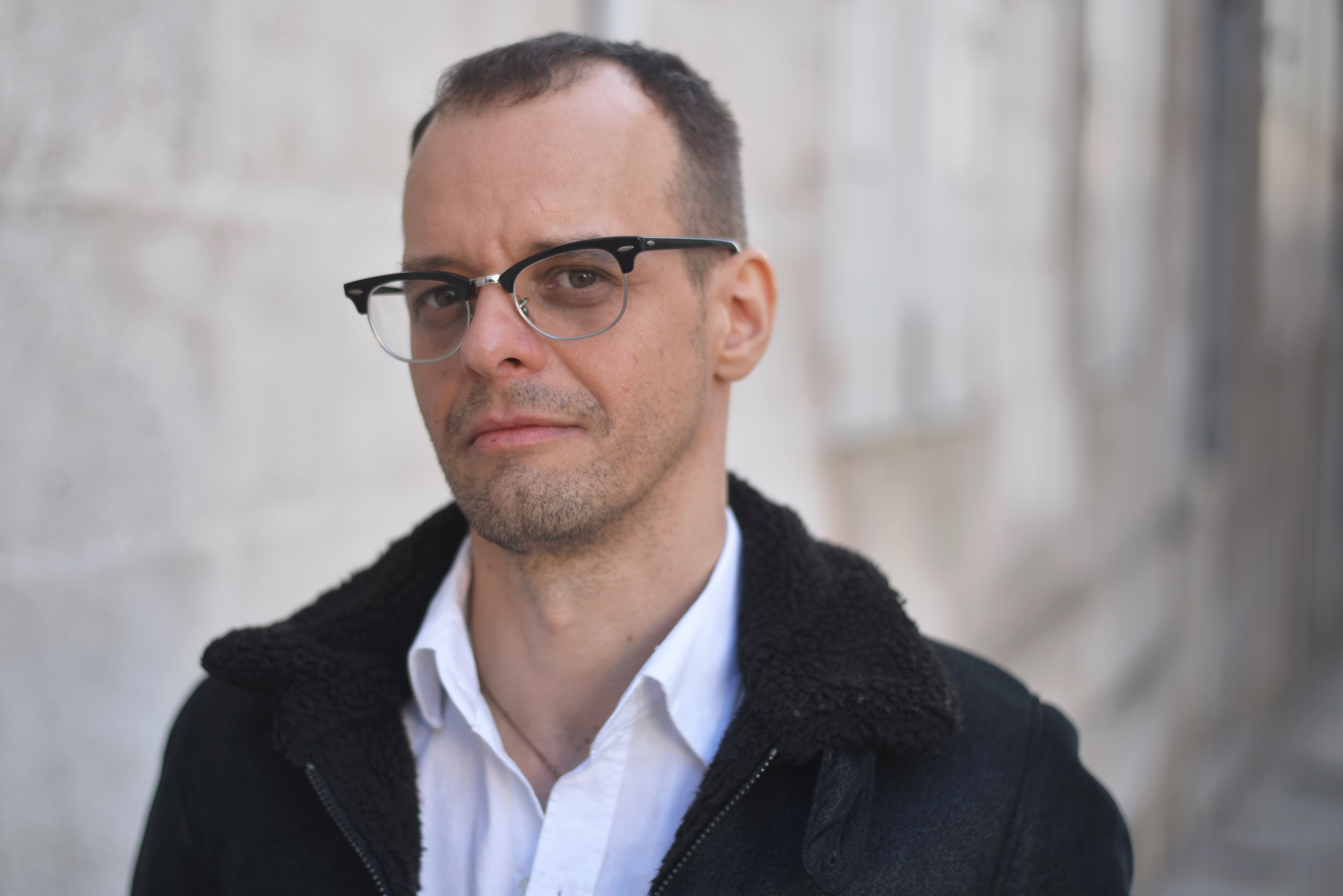
Marcello Quintanilha at Festival d'Angoulême, 2016.

Marcello Eduardo Mouco Quintanilha Quintanilha (born 1971) is a Brazilian comic book artist.

Born in Niterói, he first published comics in 1988, for magazines such as Mestre Kim, General, Metal Pesado and Zé Pereira, under the pseudonym Marcelo Gaú. In 1999 he published his first graphic novel, Fealdade de Fabiano Gorila.

That year, during the first edition of the International Comics Festival of Belo Horizonte, he met François Boucq, who became interested in his work and convinced him to send his drawings to European publishers. In 2003, he published La promesse the first volume of the series Sept balles pour Oxford, by Belgian publishing house Le Lombard, written by Argentine writer Jorge Zentner and the Spanish Montecarlo.

The contract with the Belgian publisher made Quintanilha move to Barcelona, to stay closer to the series' writers. He also started to publish illustrations for the Spanish newspapers El País and La Vanguardia. At the same time, he continued to produce albums for the Brazilian audience. For his 2009 comic Sábado dos meus amores he was awarded the HQMIX Trophy as best Brazilian artist.

In 2016, he was awarded the Fauve Polar SNCF award at the 43rd Festival d'Angoulême, for his graphic novel Tungstène.

In 2020 he published a prose novel, Deserama.

In 2022, at the Angoulême International Comics Festival, he is awarded the Prize for Best Album for his work Écoute, jolie Marcia.

== Main works ==
First published in Brazil

- 1999 - Fealdade de Fabiano Gorilla (Conrad)
- 2005 - Salvador (Casa 21)
- 2009 - Sábado dos meus amores (Conrad)
- 2011 - Almas públicas (Conrad)
- 2014 - Tungstênio (Veneta)
- 2015 - Talco de vidro (Veneta)
  - English edition: The Lights of Niterói (Fantagraphics,2026)
- 2019 - Luzes de Niterói (Veneta)
- 2020 - Deserama (novel)
- 2021 - Escuta, formosa Márcia (Veneta)
  - English edition: Listen, Beautiful Márcia (Fantagraphics, 2023)
- 2023- Alimenta estes olhos (Veneta; compilation of Sábado dos Meus Amores and Almas Públicas, with several unpublished stories)

First published in France:

- Sept balles pour Oxford series :

- 2003 - 1 - La Promesse
- 2004 - 2 - La Perle
- 2005 - 3 - La Fuite
- 2006 - 4 - L'Héritière
- 2007 - 5 - Le Grillon
- 2009 - 6 - Le Fantôme
- 2012 - 7 - La Vulnérabilité

- 2026: Eldorado (Le Lombard)
