= Universo HQ =

Brazilian comic-related news website

- Website type: Comic book
- Available in: Brazilian Portuguese
- Creator: Samir Naliato
- Editor: Sidney Gusman
- Website: universohq.com
- Commercial: Yes
- Registration: No
- Launched: January 5, 2000

Universo HQ ("Comics Universe") is a Brazilian website about comics and considered the most important Brazilian information source on comics-related news.

== History ==
Universo HQ was created by Samir Naliato and first aired on January 5, 2000. After six months, he invited the journalist Sidney Gusman to become the website's editor. Gusman also invited Sérgio Codespoti and Marcelo Naranjo to work with them, followed by many different collaborators during the years. The first journalistic highlight to Universo HQ was in 2000, when artist Jerry Robinson had an infarction during a visit to São Paulo. The Universo HQ's coverture become the main source for the non-specialized press.

== Book ==
In 2015, the Brazilian publishing house Nemo launched the book Universo HQ Entrevista ("Universo HQ Interviews", ISBN 978-85-82862-64-3), with a compilation of 23 interviews made in the first 15 years of the website, with comic artists as Will Eisner, Ivo Milazzo, Joe Kubert, Mark Waid, Lourenço Mutarelli, Neil Gaiman, John Byrne, Giancarlo Berardi, Don Rosa, etc., including two new interviews made specially for the book, with José Luis García-López and Mauricio de Sousa.

== Podcast ==
On August 21, 2015, Universo HQ aired the first episode of the podcast Confins do Universo ("Confines of the Universe") with a discussion about the new Fantastic Four movie. The podcast is published periodically each two weeks with a main theme discussed by Naliato, Gusman, Codespoti and Naranjo, with participation of different guests.

== Awards ==
Universo HQ won Troféu HQ Mix, the most importante comic-related Brazilian award, ten times in the categories "Best Website About Comics" (from 2001 to 2008) and "Best Media About Comics" (2010 and 2011). The editor Sidney Gusman also won Troféu HQ Mix from 2001 to 2007 in the category "Best Specialized Journalist" and the Jayme Cortez Trophy (destined to reward great contributions to Brazilian comics) in 2004 and 2014.
