= Marcelo D'Salete =

Brazilian comics artist (born 1979)

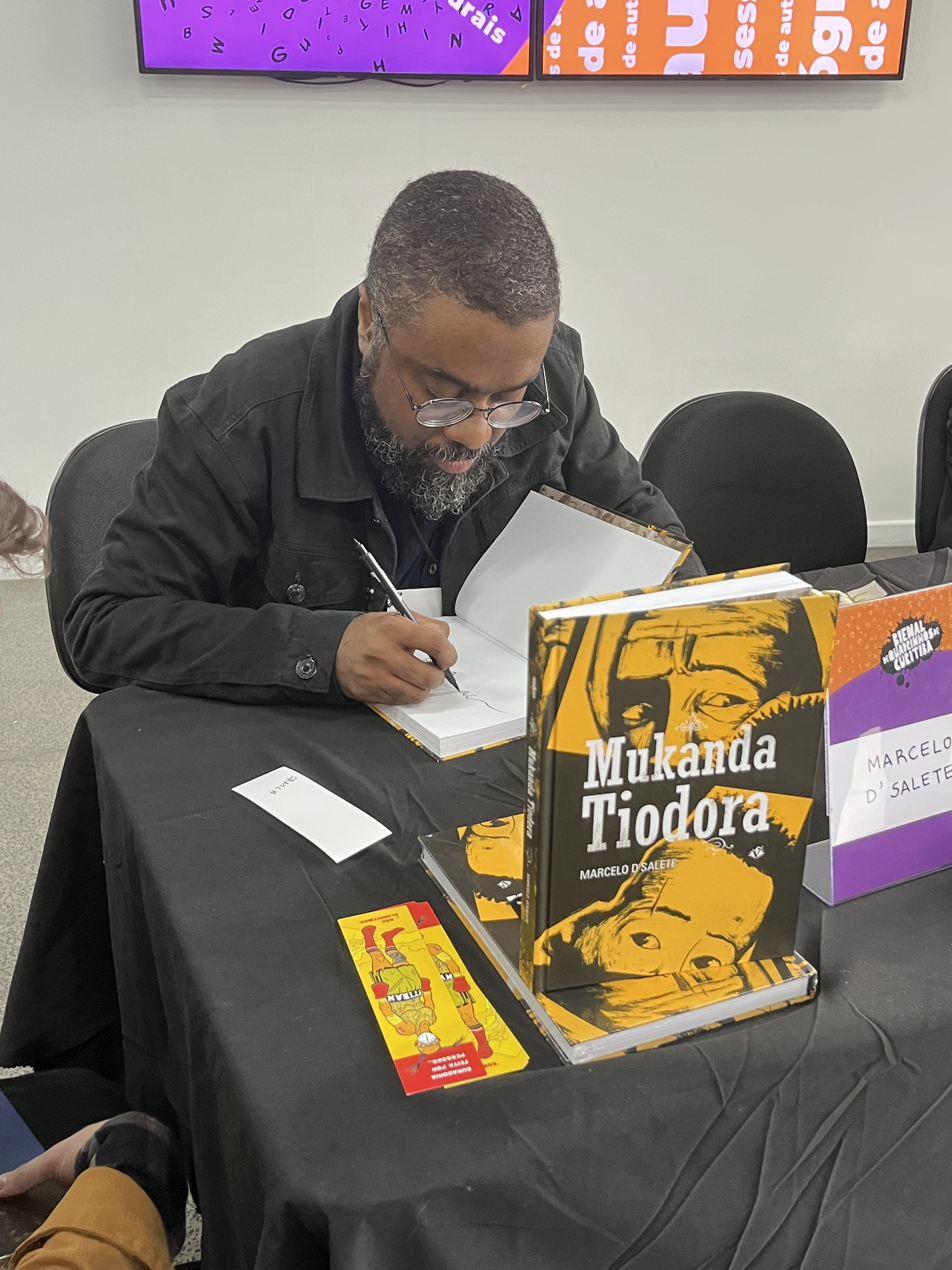
- Area: Cartoonist
- Notable works: Cumbe; Angola Janga
- Awards: Eisner Award for Best U.S. Edition of International Material

Marcelo D'Salete (born 1979) is a Brazilian comic book writer, illustrator and professor. He holds a master's degree in art history from the University of São Paulo.

During his adolescence, he studied graphic design at Carlos de Campos College and worked as an illustrator for publishers. He premiered as a comic book artist in 2001, publishing in the magazines Quadreca and Front.

His first graphic novel, Noite Luz, was published in 2008. In 2011, he published the comic book Encruzilhada.

His most acclaimed works deal with the history of resistance to slavery in Brazil from the perspective of the Afro-Brazilian peoples: Run for It: Stories of Slaves Who Fought for Their Freedom, from 2014, and Angola Janga: Kingdom of Runaway Slaves from 2017. Angola Janga: Kingdom of Runaway Slaves, is a story about the Palmares quilombo, took eleven years of research and work by the author.

== Background ==
He became interested in comic books when he was four years old. D’Salete began his career as an illustrator in 1997. Some of his inspirations were Alberto Breccia and Flavio Colin, as well as their works that use black and white. His first comic book publications appeared in 2001 in independent newspapers.

== Awards ==
His work Encruzilhada was nominated for the Troféu HQ Mix in 2012 in the category Edição Especial Nacional. Run for It: Stories of Slaves Who Fought for Their Freedom (Cumbe, in the original Portuguese edition) was published in English in 2017 by Fantagraphics. It was nominated for and won the 2018 Eisner Awards, in the Best U.S. Edition of International Material category.

== Works ==
- 2008 - Noite Luz
- 2011- Encruzilhada
- 2014- Run for It: Stories of Slaves Who Fought for Their Freedom, Fantagraphics, 2017.
- 2017- Angola Janga: Kingdom of Runaway Slaves. Translated by Andrea Rosenberg. Fantagraphics, 2019.
- 2022- Tiodora's Letters. Translated by Andrea Rosenberg. Fantagraphics, 2026.
