= Gustavo Borges (artist) =

Brazilian comics artist

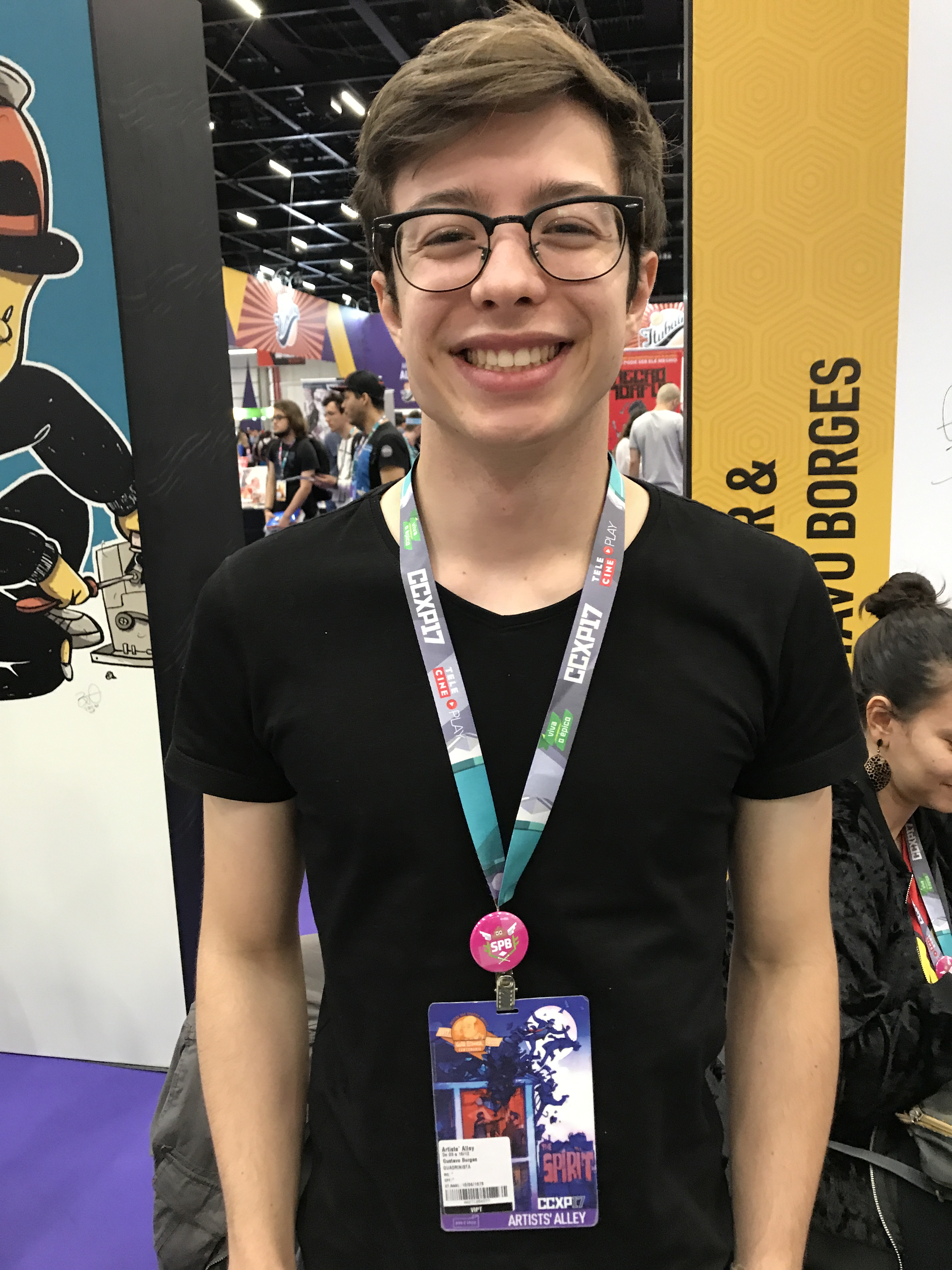
- Area: Cartoonist
- Notable works: A Entediante Vida de Morte Crens; Edgar
- Awards: Prêmio Angelo Agostini for Best Children's Release; Troféu HQ Mix

Gustavo Borges is a Brazilian comics writer, author of the webcomics A Entediante Vida de Morte Crens and Edgar. Gustavo also participated in collections such as Memórias do Mauricio and 321 Fast Comics, in addition to publishing graphic novels such as Pétalas (Petals) (with Cris Peter, published by Marsupial Editora) and Escolhas (with Felipe Cagno, published by Geektopia). In 2015, Gustavo won the Troféu HQ Mix in the category "Best Independent Publication" for the first Edgar strip collection, published independently the previous year. Gustavo has already released Petals in Portugal, Poland and United States (published by Boom! Studios), and participated in Amazing World of Gumball 2017 Grab Bag #1.
