= Níquel Náusea =

- Author: Fernando Gonsales
- Website: Official Website (in Portuguese)
- Current status/schedule: Ongoing
- Launch date: 1985
- Genre(s): Satirical, Nonsensical

Níquel Náusea is the name of a comic strip created by Brazilian cartoonist Fernando Gonsales. The character is a rat (furthering the reference to Mickey Mouse on his name) who thinks up crazy plans for getting food, and expresses an ironic view of humanity.

The spirit of the strip is sarcastic, and sometimes nonsensical. It first appeared in 1985 in the São Paulo newspaper Folha, when its creator won a contest for new comic artists. The strip is usually about animals. The episodes feature both one-time characters (from protozoans to dinosaurs), and a regular cast of characters, whose leader is Níquel Náusea. Humans also appear occasionally.

A few of the characters' names embody specific jokes: for instance, the name of the character "Flit" (a drug-abusing cockroach, who enjoys insecticides, and is Níquel's best friend) is originally a brand name for an insecticide spray. The name of the rat "Rato Ruter" comes from the American company Roto-Rooter, which specializes in clearing clogged drains.
