= Piteco – Ingá =

Brazilian novel by shiko

Piteco - Ingá

Publication information
- Publisher: Panini Comics
- Genre: Adventure, Prehistoric fiction
- Publication date: November, 2013
- Main character: The Cavern Clan

Creative team
- Written by: Shiko
- Artist: Shiko

Piteco – Ingá (Pitheco - Ingá) is a 2013 Brazilian graphic novel written and illustrated by Shiko based on the Cavern Clan characters created by Maurício de Sousa. It is part of the Graphic MSP series of graphic novels based on de Sousa's work.

The title refers to the inscriptions on the Ingá Stone, located in Paraíba, where author Shiko originates. Although de Sousa never established a specific location or time period for the characters, Shiko sets his story in prehistoric Brazil. The graphic novel draws inspiration from Brazilian folklore.

== Synopsis ==
When the lake near the village of Lem goes dry, Pitheco, Tooga, Ogra and Beleléu realize they need to move somewhere with access to water. Hours before the journey, Tooga is kidnapped and Pitheco decides to go after her with Beleléu as his partner. But to succeed in their mission, the two brave hunters will face many dangers. They also receive help from folkloric entities that protect the forest and the creatures that inhabit it.
