= To the Heart of the Storm =

1991 autobiographical graphic novel by Will Eisner

- Creator: Will Eisner
- Date: 1991
- Page count: 208 pages
- Publisher: Kitchen Sink Press
- Editor: Dave Schreiner
- ISBN: 9780878161331

To the Heart of the Storm is an autobiographical graphic novel by American cartoonist Will Eisner released in 1991. It tells of Willie's youth as the son of an immigrant family up to World War II.

On its release, writer Tom De Haven gave the book an A rating in Entertainment Weekly, calling Eisner "at the age of 74 ... a risk taker and an artist of astonishing vitality". The book won the 1992 Eisner Award (named for Will Eisner) for Best Graphic Album: New. It also won the 1992 Harvey Award for Best Graphic Album of Original Work.

== Publication history ==
To the Heart of the Storm was originally released by Kitchen Sink Press in 1991. Kitchen Sink republished it in 1995. After Kitchen Sink's demise in 1999, DC Comics took over the publishing rights to the book, releasing an edition in 2000 (ISBN 9781563896798). W. W. Norton published an edition of the book in 2008 (ISBN 9780393328103).
