= Álvaro de Moya =

Brazilian journalist, professor, researcher, artist, writer and TV producer

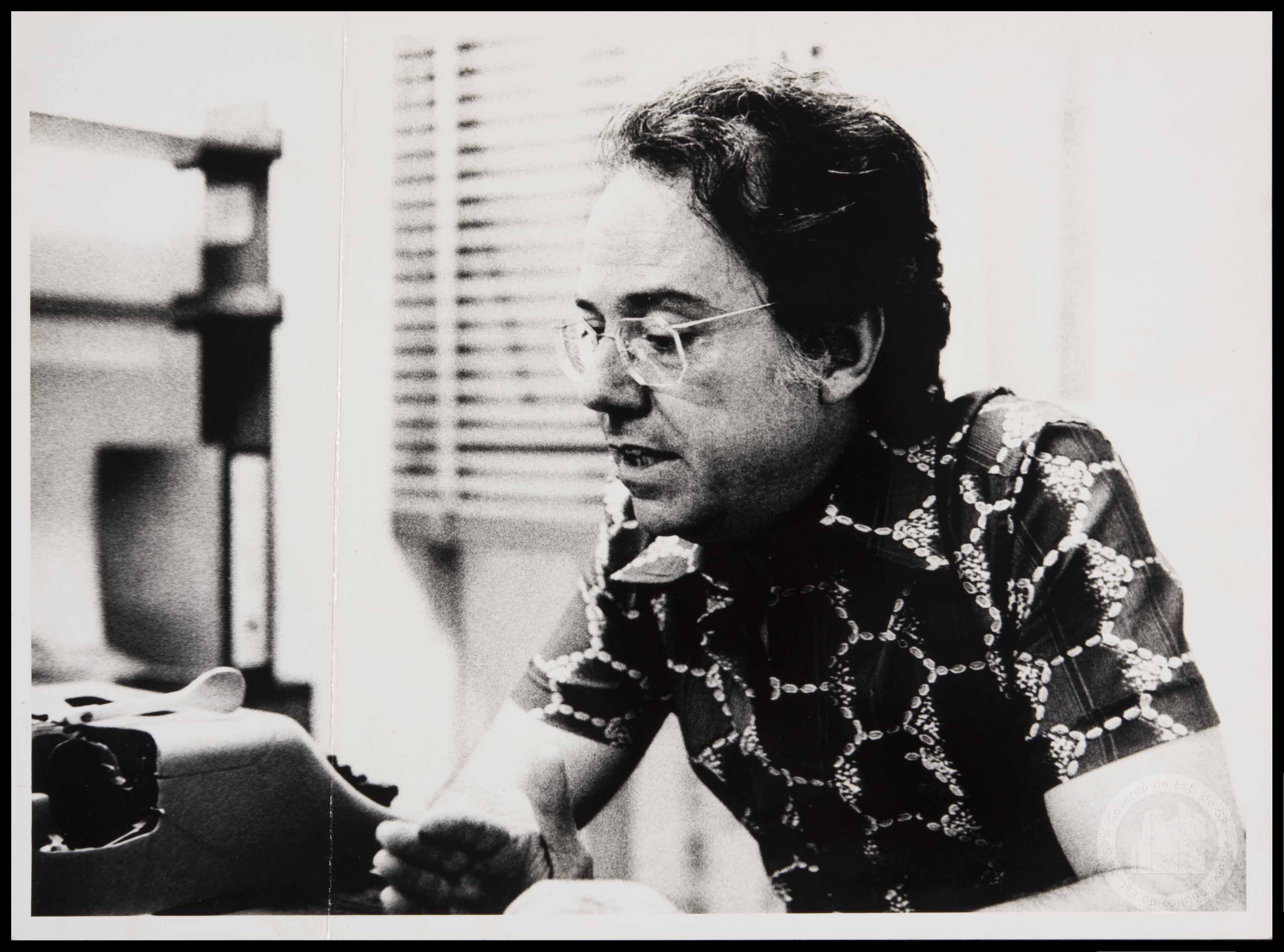
- Born: July 19, 1930; São Paulo
- Died: August 14, 2017 (aged 87)
- Occupation: University teacher, researcher, journalist, comics artist, illustrator
- Employer: School of Communications and Arts (1970–1992); University of São Paulo (1970–1992)
- Spouse(s): Cláudia Lévay
- Awards: Troféu Angelo Agostini for Master of National Comics (1989); Prêmio "A Life Dedicated to Comics" (Troféu Bigorna) (2009)

Álvaro de Moya (São Paulo, July 19, 1930 – São Paulo, August 14, 2017) was a Brazilian journalist, professor, researcher, comics artist, illustrator, writer and TV producer. He was one of the pioneers in academic research on comics in Brazil and one of those responsible for the First International Exhibition of Comics, held in São Paulo in 1951 (the first exhibition of comics in Brazil and one of the first in the world). Moya worked on the Disney comics published by Editora Abril, published novel adaptations at the EBAL publishing house, and made cartoons, illustrations and articles about comics for several newspapers. His first book, Shazam!, published in 1970, is considered one of the most important for Brazilian research on comics. In 1989, he was awarded with the Prêmio Angelo Agostini for Master of National Comics, an award that aims to honor artists who have dedicated themselves to Brazilian comics for at least 25 years.
