= Douglas Quinta Reis =

Brazilian editor and publisher of comics and role-playing games

- Born: February 24, 1954
- Died: October 13, 2017 (aged 63)
- Occupation: Editorial Director of Devir

Douglas Quinta Reis (February 24, 1954 - October 13, 2017) was a Brazilian editor and publisher, known for popularizing Role-playing games (RPGs) and comic books in Brazil.

== Career ==
In 1987, Quinta Reis met Mauro Martinez dos Prazeres while working at Unisys, an information technology services company. In 1987, the pair founded Devir Livraria in São Paulo, along with Walder Mitsiharu Yano and Martinez's wife, Deborah Fink.

Devir was initially an importer of RPG fantasy books, and comics aimed at adults, connecting a Brazilian audience with the North American comics market. The comics include titles from Marvel, DC, Image, Dark Horse, and other independent publishers. Devir later became a publishing house, being one of the most important Brazilian publishers of RPGs and card games, with subsidiaries in Portugal, Spain, and Chile and other Latin American countries.

In 1990, Devir began translating and publishing RPG books in Portuguese. In 1995, the company began importing Magic: The Gathering, a deck-building game. Devir imported other popular RPGs, including Dungeons & Dragons and GURPS.

In 2000, Devir brought the Pokémon Trading Card Game to Brazil.

== Personal life ==
On October 13, 2017, Quinta Reis died of a heart attack at the age of 65.

In 2017, Quinta Reis won, in memoriam, the Troféu HQ Mix in the "Great Homage" category. National RPG Day was created in Brazil in 2017 and celebrated on Quinta Reis' birthday, February 24.
