= Astronauta – Magnetar =

Brazilian graphic novel

Astronauta - Magnetar

Publication information
- Publisher: Panini Comics
- Genre: Science fiction
- Publication date: October, 2012
- Main character: Astronauta

Creative team
- Written by: Danilo Beyruth
- Artist: Danilo Beyruth
- Colorist: Cris Peter

Astronauta – Magnetar (Astronaut - Magnetar) is a 2012 Brazilian graphic novel written and illustrated by Danilo Beyruth based on the character Astronauta created by Maurício de Sousa. It is the first installment in the Graphic MSP series of graphic novels based on Maurício de Sousa characters. The graphic novel had a continuation in Astronauta - Singularidade (2014), Astronauta - Assimetria (2016), Astronauta - Entropia (2018), Astronauta - Parallax (2020) and Astronauta: Convergência (2022).

== Synopsis ==
The Astronaut visits a distant galaxy to study a magnetar, a neutron star that has a magnetic field estimated at one billion teslas. But he makes a mistake that can cost his life.

Now, with the damaged spaceship and without communication, he is "shipwrecked in space" and needs to find a way to escape before being defeated by the insanity that insists on taking his mind. The output can be in combining the technology to the teachings of his long deceased grandfather.

== Other languages ==
In addition to Portuguese, Astronauta - Magnetar has been translated into these languages.

| Language | Local Title | Publisher | Source |
|---|---|---|---|
| German | Der Astronaut | Panini Comics | |
| Spanish | Astronauta – Magnetar | Panini Comics | |
| French | Astronaute – Au Coeur Du Magnétar | Panini Comics | |
| Italian | L’Astronauta – Magnetar | Panini Comics | |

== Other media ==
A teaser of an animated television miniseries produced by Danilo Beyruth and Cris Peter based on the graphic novels was released at Comic Con Experience 2017. At Comic Con Experience 2018, Mauricio de Sousa Produções revealed that the miniseries would be co-produced and distributed by HBO. The series premiered on October 18, 2024, on HBO and Max.
