= Guia dos Quadrinhos =

Brazilian comic book database

Guia dos Quadrinhos (Comics Guide) is a Brazilian comic book database created with the objective of cataloging all comics published in Brazil, whether graphic novels, magazines, fanzines or independent publications.

== History ==
Edson Diogo, creator of Guia dos Quadrinhos, was responsible for the "price guide" section of the Brazilian edition of Wizard magazine in 1990s. The difficulty of obtaining reliable information about Brazilian comics at the time inspired him to create the database. The first version of Guia dos Quadrinhos was aired in 2006 and was updated manually by Diogo after receiving information sent by readers to him. In 2007, after suggestion of journalist Ricardo Soneto, the project became a collaborative database and had its official release.

== Structure ==
The Guia dos Quadrinhos database records all information about Brazilian comics, such as date of publication, publisher, genre, size and price. For each edition of magazines or graphic novels, there is the possibility of individually registering each story, as well as authors, characters and story arcs. In the case of Brazilian editions of foreign material, there is also the indication of the original work, with cover and complete data.

There is also a list of authors and publishers, with a list of the works in which they participated. Guia dos Quadrinhos also has a blog, a space for publishing studies about comics and a social network in which users can relate and publicize their collections of comics. All informations are registered by collaborators. Covers are only posted after site team approval and, in some cases, after Diogo's digital restoration if the original comic book was very old and rare. New data also is checked regularly.

== Festival Guia dos Quadrinhos ==
In 2009, the Festival Guia dos Quadrinhos was organized for the first time (until 2013, was called Mercado das Pulgas - Flea Market). The event is held bi-annually in São Paulo and its main objective is to give space for comic collectors to sell and exchange comics and related materials. Since 2009, the Festival also has booth for artists and publishers, as well as talks with artists and comics professionals.

== Books ==
In 2017, Guia dos Quadrinhos published a book in honor of Jack Kirby (Os mundos de Jack Kirby: um tributo ao rei dos quadrinhos, ISBN 978-85-922667-0-7). Organized by Edson Diogo and comic artist Will, the book counted with 100 Brazilian artists, who draw the most important characters created by Kirby accompanied by descriptive texts. The book was crowdfunded by Brazilian crowdfunding website Catarse.

In 2018, a new book was released, also by crowdfunding, this time honoring the Vertigo imprint (Vertigo: além do limiar, ISBN 978-85-922667-1-4). 25 writers and 25 artists participated in the book, which also featured interviews with Karen Berger, Jamie Delano and Peter Milligan.

== Awards ==
In 2017, Guia dos Quadrinhos won Troféu HQ Mix as a homage to its 10th anniversary.
