= Omar Viñole =

Portuguese-Brazilian comic book artist

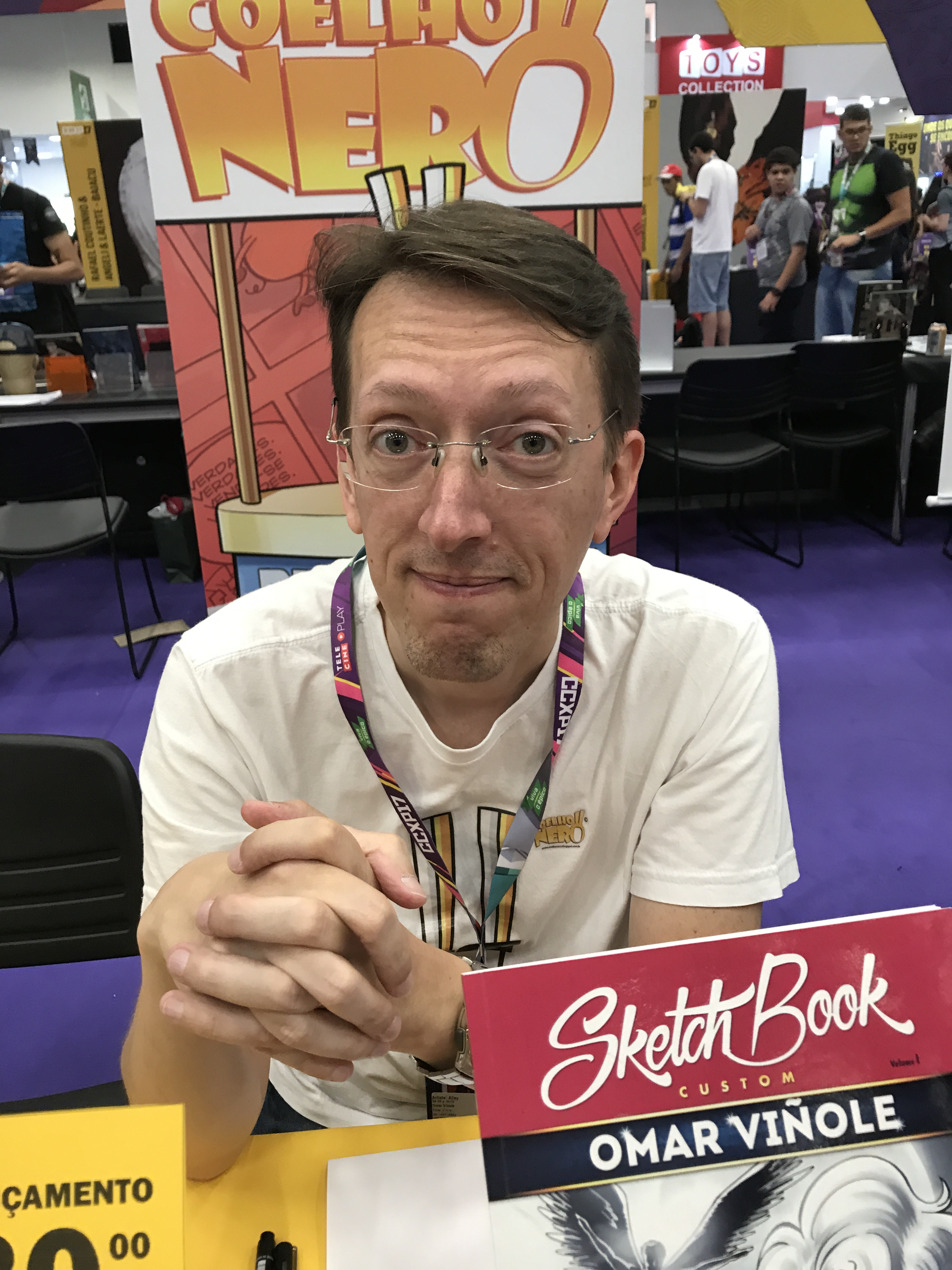
- Areas: Cartoonist, Inker, Colourist
- Notable works: Yeshuah; Histórias do Clube da Esquina; Depois da Meia-Noite; Coelho Nero
- Awards: Troféu HQ Mix; Prêmio Angelo Agostini for Best Release; Prêmio Angelo Agostini for Best Inker

Omar Viñole (Lisbon, Portugal) is a Portuguese-born Brazilian comics artist, colorist and inker.

He and Laudo Ferreira Jr. founded the Banda Desenhada studio in 1996, in which Omar made colors and inks for many comics projects, as Yeshuah, Histórias do Clube da Esquina (about the Brazilian music artists collective) and Depois da Meia-Noite (which gave him the 2009 Troféu HQ Mix as "Best Independent Special Publication"). He was awarded as "Best inker" in 2003 (Prêmio Angelo Agostini) and 2017 (Troféu HQ Mix). In 2009, he created the webcomic Coelho Nero, a grumpy and critical rabbit, which has two printed collections (Coisas que um coelho pode te dizer, 2013, independent; and Coelho Nero: reclame aqui, 2017, Jupati Books).
