= Paulo Fukue =

Brazilian comic artist

- Born: April 3, 1948 (age 78)
- Area: Cartoonist
- Notable works: Pabeyma, Tarun and Super Heros
- Awards: Prêmio Angelo Agostini for Master of National Comics

Paulo Fukue (born April 3, 1948) was a Brazilian comic artist of Japanese descent. He began his career in the 1960s, first at Pan Juvenil publishing house and then at EDREL, which at the time hired other artists of Japanese descent such as Minami Keizi, Claudio Seto and Roberto Fukue, Paulo's brother. At EDREL, Fukue drew the comic books Pabeyma, Tarun and Super Heros. In 1972, Fukue took over as editor-in-chief of EDREL after Keizi's departure, but he also left just a month later after being tortured by the police for something that had been published by the publisher (it was the time of the Brazilian Military Dictatorship's repression and censorship). Fukue then went to editora Abril with his brother, where, among other things, he worked with the comic book Senninha. In 1995, he was awarded with the Prêmio Angelo Agostini for Master of National Comics, an award that aims to honor artists who have dedicated themselves to Brazilian comics for at least 25 years.
