= Klévisson Viana =

Brazilian poet and writer

Klévisson Viana (Quixeramobim, November 3, 1972) is a Brazilian cordel literature poet, comics artist and editor. In 1995 he founded the Tupynanquim publishing house, specialized in comics and cordel. He is also a member of the Brazilian Cordel Literature Academy. He started working as illustrator in 1988, at the age of 15, in the newspaper A Voz do Povo, in Canindé. He won the Troféu HQ Mix three times: best national graphic novel in 1999 (for Lampião: era o cavalo do tempo atrás da besta da vida), best adventure and fiction magazine in 2001 (for Mirabilia) and best national special edition in 2004 (for A Moça que Namorou o Bode). Viana also won the third place in Prêmio Jabuti in 2014 with the adaptation of The Guarani in cordel.
