= Turma do Xaxado =

Brazilian comic strip by Antônio Cedraz

Turma do Xaxado is a Brazilian comic strip created by the cartoonist Antônio Cedraz. Set in a rural area in Bahia, more precisely in the Caatinga region, it shows the adventures of a boy who lives on a lower-class farm and his friends. Most of the stories are focused on comedy, showing Xaxado and his friends in funny situations often with an absurd and slapstick humor, with creatures from Brazilian mythology like Saci, the Headless Mule and Iara. However, environmental matters and financial conditions are also shown in many stories, showing the problems that occur in the Caatinga region such as drought and unemployment.

The comics have been published in various newspapers and magazines. The last comic book was published in 2010 by HQM Editora. In 2015, a new cartoon was announced.
