= Cris Peter =

Brazilian colorist

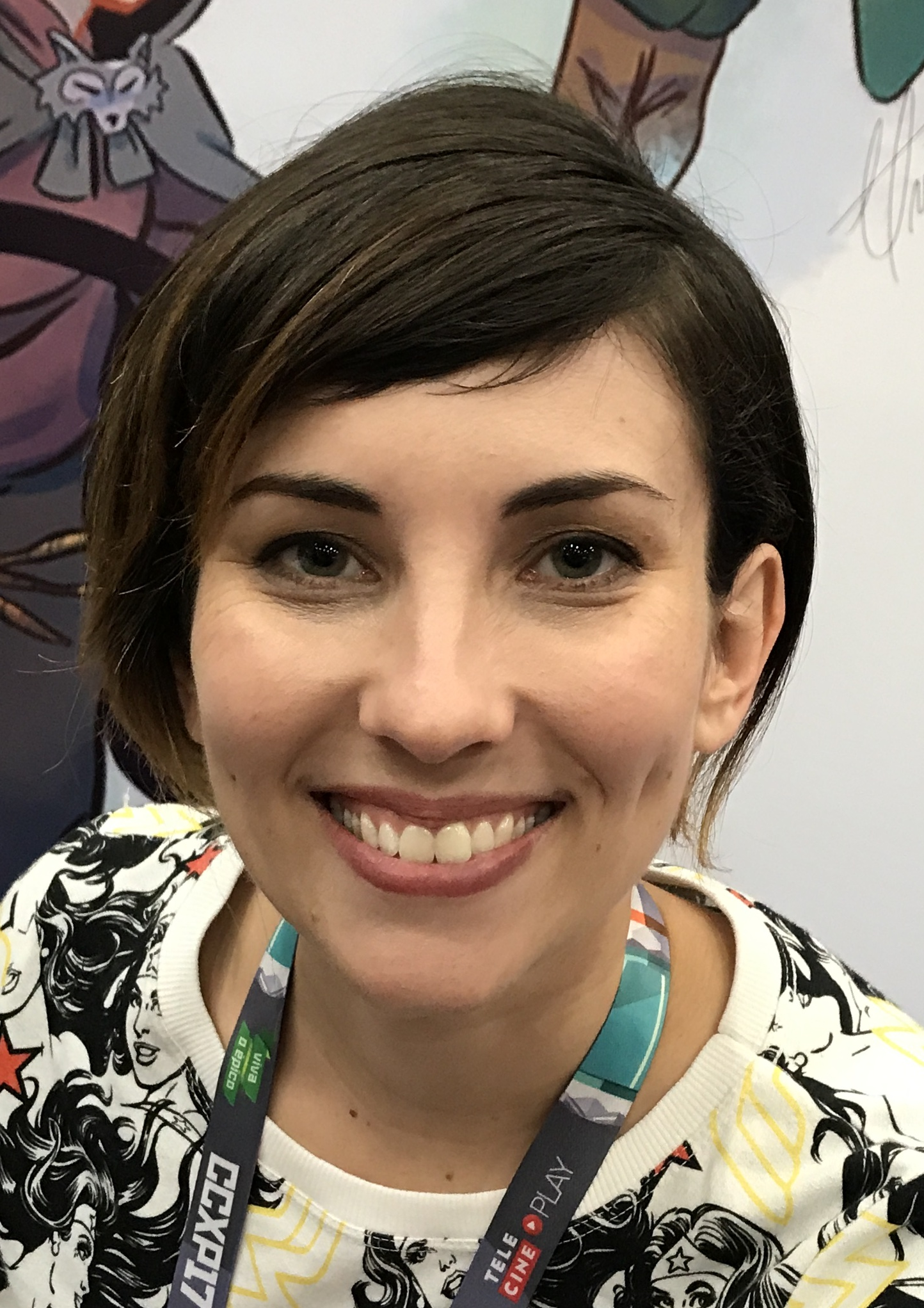
- Cris Peter in 2017 Comic Con Experience.
- Born: 15 June 1983; Porto Alegre
- Occupations: Comics artist, illustrator, penciller
- Notable work: Astronauta: Assimetria, Astronauta: Singularidade, Petals, Astronauta – Magnetar, Casanova, The Manhattan Projects
- Awards: Troféu HQ Mix for best colorist (Casanova, The Manhattan Projects, 2016); Troféu HQ Mix for best colorist (Astronauta: Assimetria, Memórias do Mauricio, 2017); Prêmio Angelo Agostini for Best Colorist (Astronauta: Entropia, 2019); Prêmio Al Rio for International Outstanding (2015)

Cris Peter (June 15, 1983) is a Brazilian colorist. She works mainly in the American comics market for publishers like DC Comics and Marvel Comics. She was nominated for the Eisner Award for her colors in comic series Casanova. She also did the colors of important Brazilian comics, as Astronauta – Magnetar (with Danilo Beyruth, published by Panini Comics) and Petals (with Gustavo Borges, published by Marsupial Editora). In 2013, she published the theoretical book O Uso das Cores (The Use of Colors), by Marsupial Editora. She won the Troféu HQ Mix in 2016 and 2017, in the category "Best Colorist".
