= Roberto Fukue =

Brazilian comic artist

- Born: October 7, 1955 (age 71)
- Area: Cartoonist
- Pseudonym: Rof
- Notable works: Disney comics
- Awards: Prêmio Angelo Agostini for Master of National Comics
- Relatives: Paulo Fukue

Roberto Fukue (born October 7, 1955), sometimes Roberto O. Fukue or Rof, was a Brazilian comic artist of Japanese descent. He started working with comic books at age 16, following his brother Paulo Fukue, who had been hired by the EDREL publishing house. In 1972, Fukue went to editora Abril, again together with his brother, where he worked for many years with Disney comics, drawing characters like José Carioca, Goofy, Mickey, etc. He also worked on the comic books Senninha and Sítio do Pica-Pau Amarelo, among others. In 1995, he was awarded with the Prêmio Angelo Agostini for Master of National Comics, an award that aims to honor artists who have dedicated themselves to Brazilian comics for at least 25 years. In 2009, Fukue was part of the creative team that relaunched the comic book Turma do Arrepio, which was a success in the 1990s.
