= Conrad Editora =

Brazilian publishing company

- Industry: Comics
- Headquarters: Brazil
- Website: https://editoraconrad.com.br/

Conrad Editora (also known as Conrad) is a book publishing company in Brazil, generally known as one of the most popular distributors of manga and manhwa in the Brazilian Portuguese language..

== Publishing history ==
=== Manga ===
- Absolute Boyfriend, by the name of Zettai Kareshi: O Namorado Perfeito
- Adolf (2006–2007)
- Bambi and Her Pink Gun, by the name of Bambi (2006)
- Battle Royale (ongoing)
- Blade of the Immortal, by the name of Blade - A Lâmina do Imortal (cancelled)
- Buddha, by the name of Buda (2005)
- Dr. Slump (cancelled)
- Dragon Ball (later part as Dragon Ball Z) (completed)
  - Definitive Edition (2005 - cancelled)
- Fushigi Yūgi
- Gon (2003 - ongoing)
- MegaMan NT Warrior (cancelled)
- Neon Genesis Evangelion (cancelled)
- Neon Genesis Evangelion: Angelic Days, by the name of Neon Genesis Evangelion: The Iron Maiden 2nd (2006 - cancelled)
- One Piece (cancelled)
- Paradise Kiss
- Pokémon: The Electric Tale of Pikachu, by the name of Pokémon: As Aventuras Elétricas de Pikachu (1999 - cancelled)
- Saint Seiya, by the name of Cavaleiros do Zodíaco (completed)
- Saint Seiya Episode G, by the name of Cavaleiros do Zodíaco Episódio G (2005 - ongoing)
- Slam Dunk (completed)
- Speed Racer: The Original Manga (completed)
- Uzumaki
- Vagabond, by the name of Vagabond: A História de Musashi (cancelled)

=== Manhwa ===
- Angry
- Banya: The Explosive Delivery Man
- Dangu
- Gui
- Model
- Ragnarök (2004 - ongoing)
- Chonchu, by the name Chonchu O Guerreiro Maldito
