= List of São Paulo State University people =

The list of São Paulo State University people includes notable graduates, professors, and administrators affiliated with the São Paulo State University, located in São Paulo, Brazil with 23 campuses all throughout the state of São Paulo.

== Alumni ==
=== Arts ===
Name	Known for	Reference
Néle Azevedo	Brazilian sculptor and independent Researcher (Visual Arts)	
Tatiana Blass	Brazilian artist	
Rafael Coutinho	Brazilian comics artist, painter and animator (Arts)	
Gustavo Duarte	Brazilian cartoonist and comics artist (Design)	

=== Media ===
Name	Known for	Reference
Ana Maria Braga	Brazilian television presenter and journalist (Biology)	

=== Music ===
Name	Known for	Reference
Ovanir Buosi	Brazilian contemporary clarinetist	
Bruna Caram	Brazilian singer, songwriter and musician (Music)	
Mauro Refosco	Brazilian percussionist (Percussion)	
Rael Bertarelli Gimenes Toffolo	Brazilian musician, composer and musicologist	
Edson Zampronha	Brazilian composer (Music Composition and Conducting)	

=== Politics ===
Name	Known for	Reference
Marinha Raupp	Brazilian politician	

=== Science ===
Name	Known for	Reference
Ulisses Caramaschi	Brazilian herpetologist specializing in neotropical frogs	
Edith Fanta	Brazilian Antarctic researcher (Zoology)	
Fernando da Costa Novaes	Brazilian ornithologist who worked on the Amazonian bird fauna	

=== Sports ===
Name	Known for	Reference
Luiz Carlos Machado Júnior	Brazilian footballer who plays as a striker for Geylang United	

=== Other ===
Name	Known for	Reference
Heleieth Saffioti	Brazilian sociologist, teacher, and feminist activist (Social Sciences)	

== Faculty ==
Notable faculty members of UNESP include:

Name	Known for	Reference
Sadhan Kumar Adhikari	Brazilian-Indian professor of physics	
Sérgio Burgani	Brazilian clarinetist	
Edwin O’Neill Willis	American ornithologist	
Mauro Galetti	Brazilian ecologist	
