= Simões =

Simões is a Portuguese surname meaning "son of Simão".

== People ==
Notable people with the surname include:

- Bruno Simões (1971–2012), Portuguese actor^{[:pt]}
- Chico Simões (1950–2026), Brazilian politician
- Francisco Simões (born 1946), Portuguese sculptor and artist^{[:pt]}
- Francisco Simões Margiochi, better known as Francisco Margiochi (1774–1838), Portuguese mathematician, professor, and politician^{[:pt]}
- Francisco Simões Margiochi, better known as Simões Margiochi (1848–1904), Portuguese agronomist, author, and politician^{[:pt]}
- Jefferson Cardia Simões (born 1958), Brazilian pioneer glaciologist^{[:pt]}
- João Simões Lopes Neto (1865–1916), Brazilian journalist and author
- José Simões Dias (1844–1899), Portuguese poet and writer
- JP Simões (born 1970), Portuguese singer and musician
- Marcelo Simões (fl. 1985), American engineer
- Yuri Simões (born 1990), Brazilian mixed martial artist

=== Footballers ===
- André Simões (born 1989), Portuguese footballer
- António Simões (born 1943), Portuguese footballer and coach
- Bruno Simões Teixeira (born 1988), Brazilian footballer
- Carlos Simões (born 1951), Portuguese footballer
- Diego Simões (born 1991), Brazilian footballer
- Eduardo Simões (born 1982), Portuguese footballer
- Fabiana da Silva Simões (born 1989), Brazilian footballer
- Jaime Daniel Melão Simões (born 1989), Portuguese footballer
- José Simões (1913–1944), Portuguese footballer
- René Simões (born 1952), Brazilian footballer and football coach
- Victor Simões (born 1981), Brazilian footballer

== Alternate spellings ==
- Preeti Simoes, TV producer

== See also ==
- Simões, Piauí, community in Brazil
- Simões Filho, municipality in Brazil
