= Saffioti =

Saffioti is an Italian surname which due to migration can also be found among others in the United States and South American countries. In Italy the largest number of people with this name live in Calabria followed by Liguria, Lombardy and Lazio. Saffiotti most probably is a toponymic surname and the small Calabrian settlement of Punta Safò (Comune di Briatico) the geographical origin of the lineage. Notable people with the surname include:

- Heleieth Saffioti (1934–2010), Brazilian sociologist, teacher and feminist activist
- Rita Saffioti (born 1972), Australian politician and economist
- Salli Saffioti (born 1976), American professional actress
