= Marinha Raupp =

Brazilian politician (born 1960)

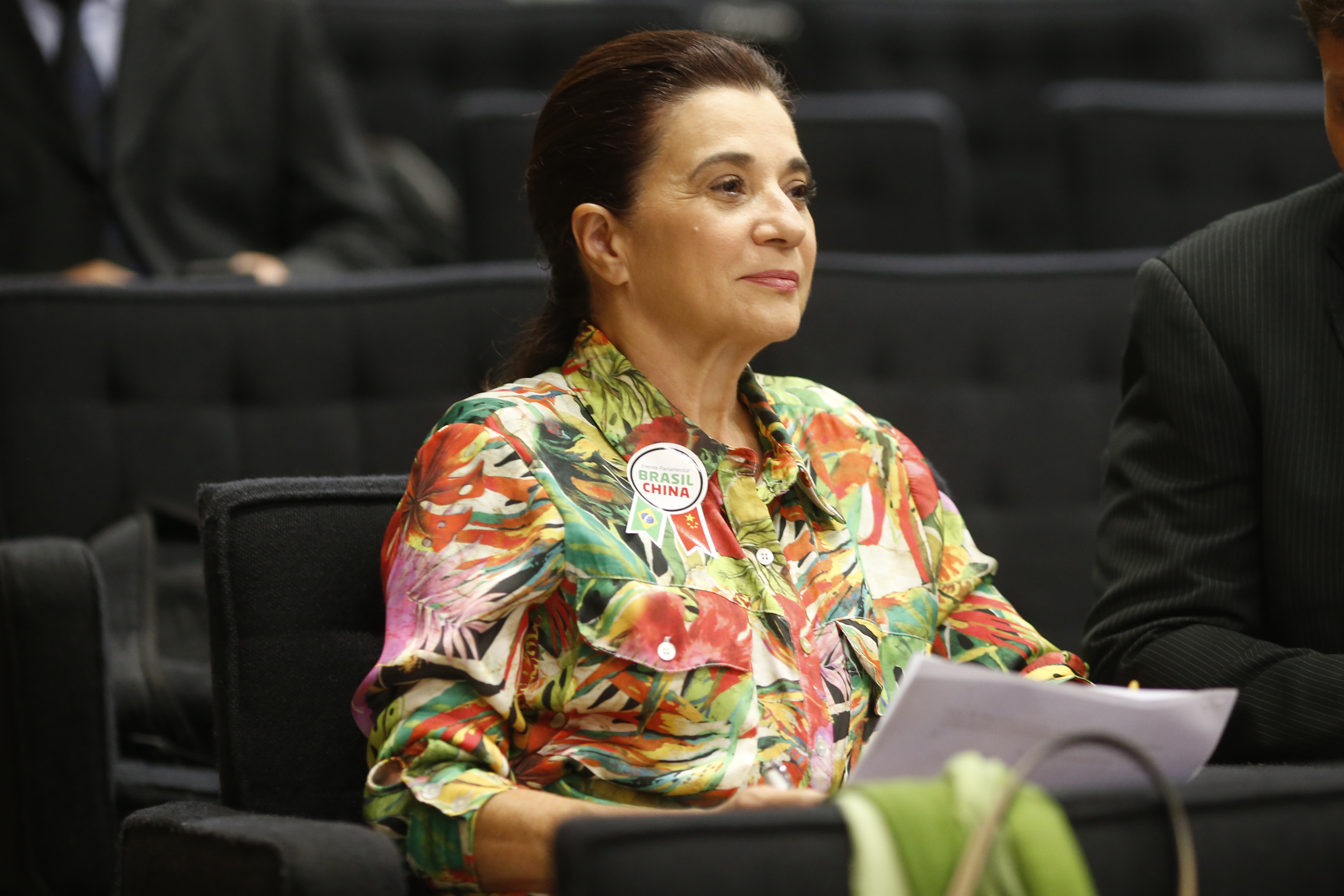
- Raupp in March 2017

Federal Deputy for Rondônia
- In office 1 February 1995 – 31 January 2019

Personal details
- Born: Marinha Célia Rocha de Matos; 23 November 1960 (age 65) Maracaí, SP, Brazil
- Party: PDMB
- Spouse: Valdir Raupp
- Education: São Paulo State University

Marinha Célia Rocha Raupp de Matos (born 23 November 1960) more simply known as Marinha Raupp is a Brazilian politician as well as a psychologist and professor. Although born in São Paulo (state), she has spent her political career representing Rondônia, having served as state representative from 1995 to 2019.

== Education ==
Raupp is an alumnus of the São Paulo State University campus in Assis. In 1985, she moved to Rondônia from her home state of São Paulo, when she accepted at a teaching position in a local university.

== Political career ==
Before becoming a politician she worked as a psychologist and a professor of psychology.

Raupp contested the 2018 Brazilian general election, but received 18,223 votes or 2.33% of the cast ballot in Rondônia which was not enough for her to be reelected to the post of federal deputy.

In early 2019 Raupp was appointed to be the advisory of an unnamed senator from Mato Grosso. The move raised some ire in the Brazilian media as despite her seemly minor role Raup still received a salary of RS$23,000 a month and she will be able to retire with a pension of RS$33,000 a month.

=== Political positions ===
Raupp voted in favor of the impeachment of then-president Dilma Rousseff. She voted in favor of the 2017 Brazilian labor reform, and would vote against a corruption investigation into Rousseff's successor Michel Temer.

== Personal life ==
Raupp is married to former senator and governor of Rondônia Valdir Raupp. She has two children, Cristiane and Valdir Jr.
