= Ephemeral art =

Art that is not intended to endure

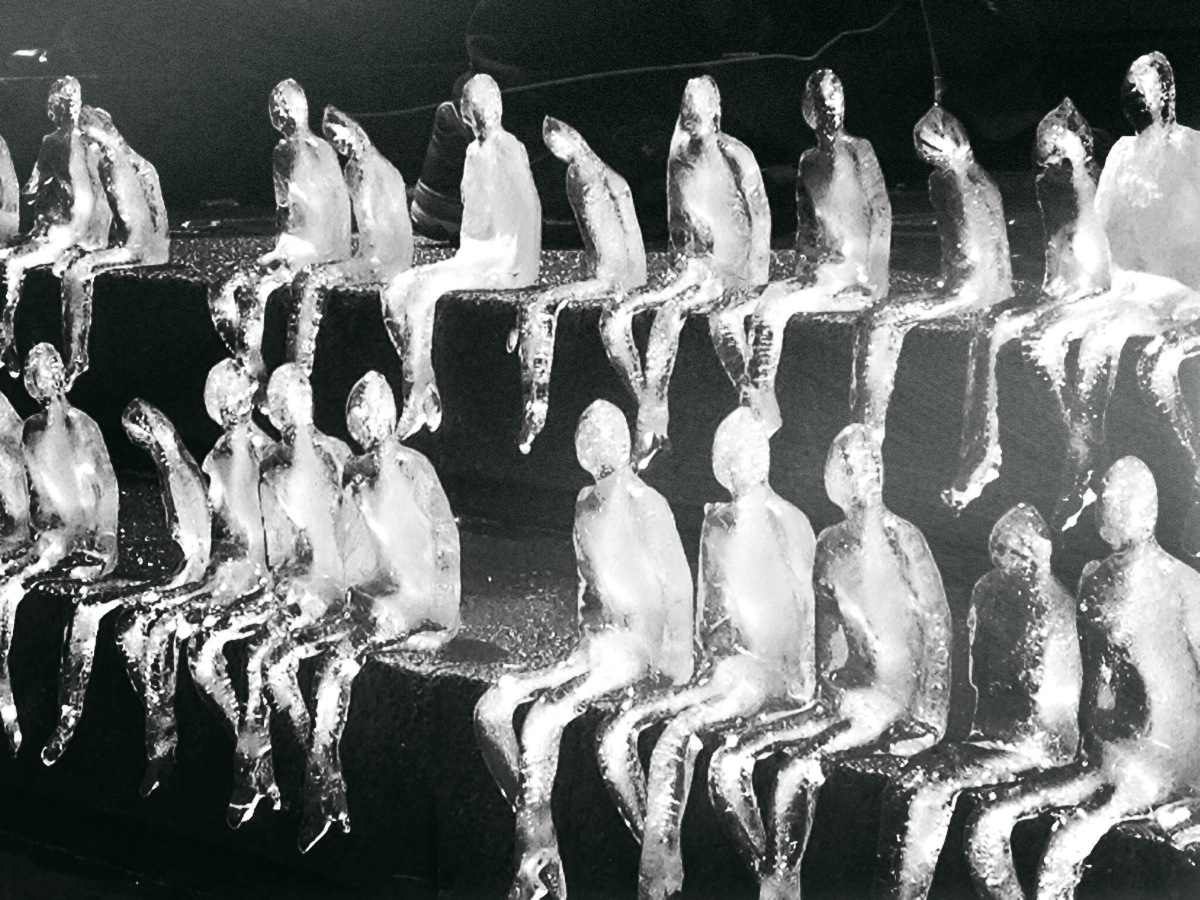
Néle Azevedo's Melting human figures in Chamberlain Square, Birmingham, UK (2014) are an example of temporary art

Ephemeral art is the name given to all artistic expression conceived under a concept of transience in time, of non-permanence as a material and conservable work of art. Because of its perishable and transitory nature, ephemeral art (or temporary art) does not leave a lasting work, or if it does – as would be the case with fashion – it is no longer representative of the moment in which it was created. In these expressions, the criterion of social taste is decisive, which is what sets the trends, for which the work of the media is essential, as well as that of art criticism.

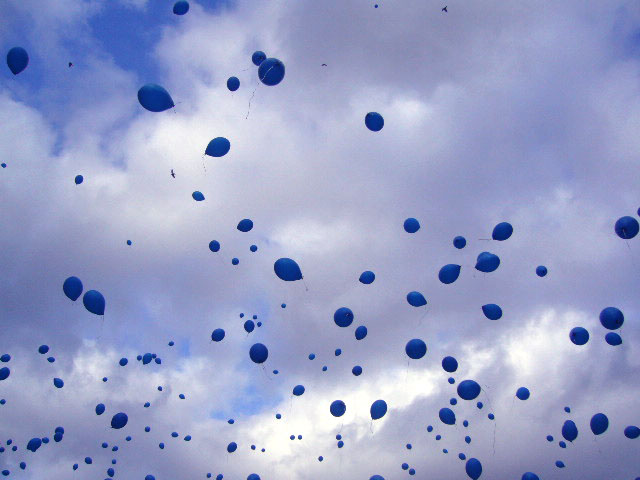
Release of 1001 blue balloons, Yves Klein's "aerostatic sculpture". Reconstruction carried out in 2007 on Place Georges-Pompidou in Paris, in celebration of the fiftieth anniversary of Klein's 1957 event.

Regardless of the fact that any artistic expression may or may not be enduring in time, and that many works conceived under the criteria of durability may disappear in a short period of time for any undetermined circumstance, ephemeral art has in its genesis a component of transience, of fleeting object or expression in time. It is a passing, momentary art, conceived for instantaneous consumption. Based on this assumption, the ephemeral arts are those whose nature is not to last in time, or those that are constantly changing and fluctuating. Within this genre, expressions such as fashion, hairdressing, perfumery, gastronomy and pyrotechnics can be considered ephemeral arts, as well as various manifestations of body art such as tattooing and piercing. The concept of ephemeral art would also include the various forms of so-called action art, such as happening, performance, environment and installation, or conceptual art, such as body art and land art, as well as other expressions of popular culture, such as graffiti. Finally, within architecture there is also a typology of constructions that are usually expressed as ephemeral architecture, since they are conceived as transitory buildings that fulfil a function restricted to a period of time.

Temporary art is usually displayed outdoors at public landmarks or in unexpected places. Temporary art is often promoted by cities, or featured in conjunction with events or festivals.

== Fundamentals of ephemeral art ==
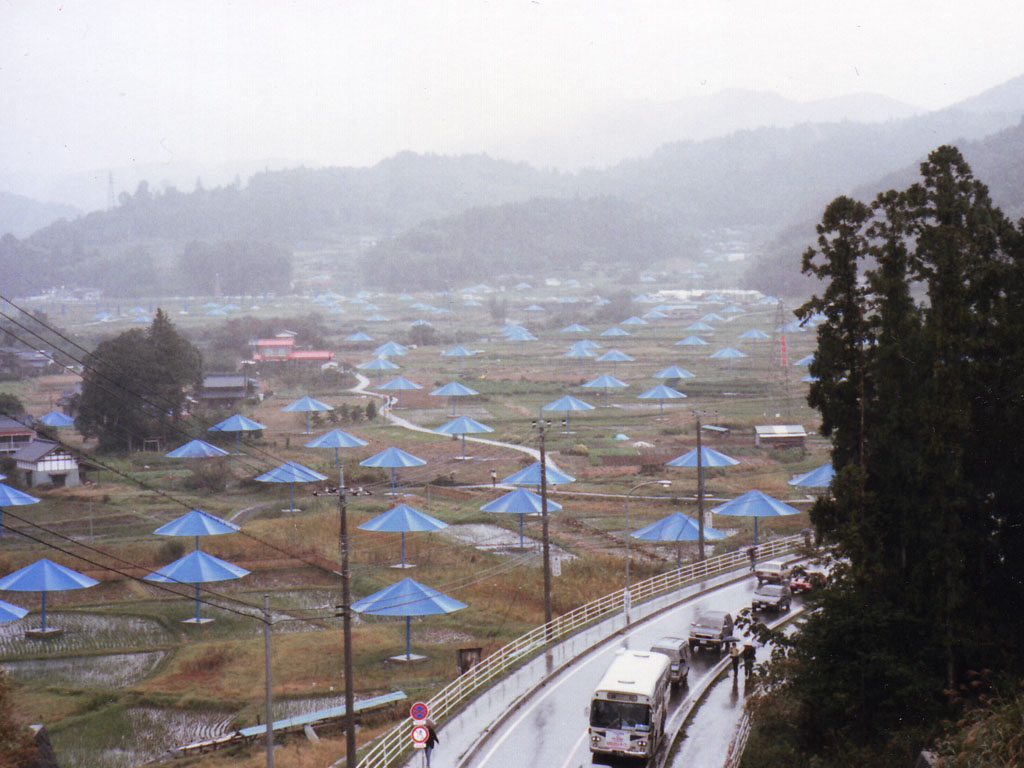
The Umbrella Project (1991), art installation by Christo, Ibaraki, Japan

The ephemeral nature of certain artistic expressions is above all a subjective concept subject to the very definition of art, a controversial term open to multiple meanings, which have oscillated and evolved over time and geographic space, since the term "art" has not been understood in the same way in all times and places. Art is a component of culture, reflecting in its conception the economic and social substrates, and the transmission of ideas and values, inherent in any human culture across space and time. However, the definition of art is open, subjective, debatable; there is no unanimous agreement among historians, philosophers or artists. In classical Greco-Roman antiquity, one of the main cradles of Western civilisation and the first culture to reflect on art, art was considered to be a human ability in any productive field, practically a synonym for "skill". In the 2nd century Galen divided art into liberal arts and vulgar arts, according to whether they had an intellectual or manual origin. The liberal arts included grammar, rhetoric and dialectics – which formed the trivium – and arithmetic, geometry, astronomy and music – which formed the quadrivium; the vulgar arts included architecture, sculpture and painting, but also other activities that are nowadays considered Crafts. In the 16th century, architecture, painting and sculpture began to be seen as activities that required not only craft and skill, but also a kind of intellectual conception that made them superior to other kinds of crafts. Thus was born the modern concept of art, which during the Renaissance acquired the name of arti del disegno (arts of design), since it was understood that this activity – designing – was the main activity in the genesis of works of art. Later, expressions such as music, poetry and dance were considered artistic activities, and in 1746 Charles Batteux established in The Fine Arts Reduced to a Single Principle the current conception of Fine arts, a term that has become successful and has survived to the present day. However, attempts to establish some basic criteria as to which expressions can be considered art and which cannot have been somewhat unsuccessful, producing in a way the opposite effect and accentuating even more the lack of definition of art, which today is an open and interpretable concept, where many formulas and conceptions fit, although a minimum common denominator based on aesthetic and expressive qualities, as well as a component of creativity, is generally accepted. Currently, to the traditional classification of the arts, certain critics and historians have added expressions such as photography, cinematography, comics, theatre, television, fashion, advertising, animation, Video games, etc., and there is still some disagreement about other types of expressive activities.

An essential aspect in the genesis of art is its social component, the interrelationship between artist and spectator, between the work and its consumer. A work of art responds to social and cultural criteria, of space and time, outside of which, even if it endures as a physical object, it loses its conceptual significance, the reason for which it was created. Even so, throughout history humans have been eager to collect and keep these objects for their unique and unrepeatable qualities, as documents of eras that endure in the memory, and which represent genuine expressions of the peoples and cultures that have succeeded one another over time. Precisely, the collectible nature of certain objects, as opposed to others that are more quickly consumed, represented a first barrier between the classification of certain expressions as art and not others, often pejoratively referred to as "fashion", "ornament", "entertainment" and similar terms. Museums and art academies, responsible for the conservation and dissemination of art, were also in charge of sponsoring and giving priority to some artistic expressions over others, and while paintings and sculptures entered these institutions without any problem, other objects or creations of various kinds were relegated to oblivion after having fulfilled their momentary function, or at most remained in the memory through written testimonies or documents attesting to their existence.

There has long been speculation about the artisticity of ephemeral expressions, about whether the ephemeral character of art and beauty can devalue these concepts. The devaluation of the ephemeral begins with Plato, for whom beautiful things were not enduring, since the only eternal thing is the "idea of the beautiful". Similarly, Christianity – from which all medieval aesthetics emanated – rejected physical beauty as transient, since the only immutable beauty was that of God. From the 19th century, however, a change of attitude towards ephemeral beauty began to take place, and it began to be valued for its intrinsic qualities. The Romantics valued 'what will never be seen twice', and Goethe went so far as to assert that only the ephemeral is beautiful: 'Why am I ephemeral, O Zeus? says Beauty / I do not make beautiful, says Zeus, any more than the ephemeral' (The Seasons).

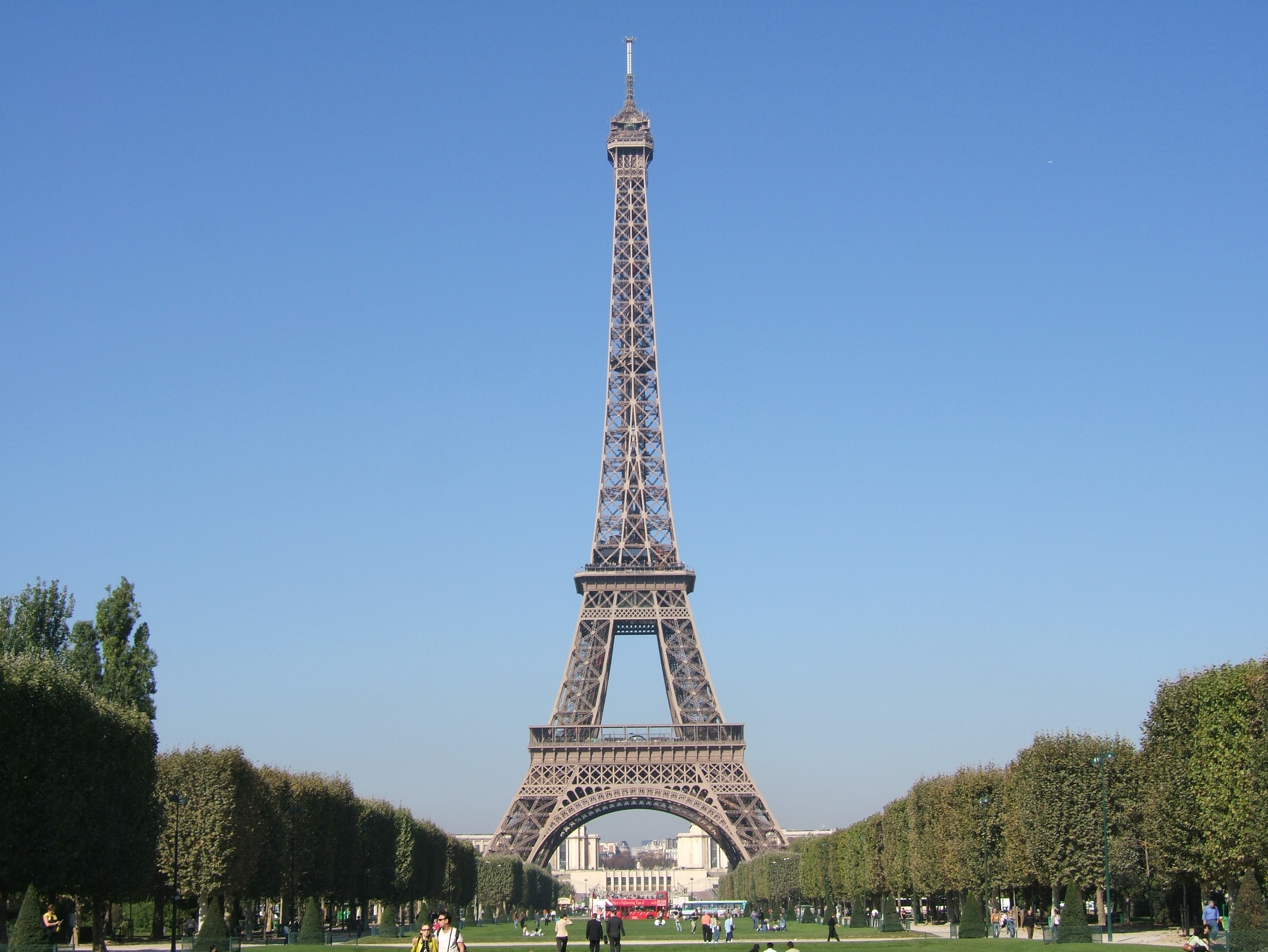
The Eiffel Tower, designed by Alexandre Gustave Eiffel for the Paris Universal Exhibition of 1889. Although it was built with the intention of being perishable, due to its success it was decided to keep it, becoming a symbol of the French capital.

Although various manifestations that can be considered as ephemeral art have existed since the beginnings of human artistic expressivity – it could even be considered as something inherent to a certain conception of art – it was in the 20th century when these forms of expression acquired a great boom. Contemporary aesthetics has presented a great diversity of trends, in parallel with the atomisation of styles produced in 20th century art. Both aesthetics and art today reflect cultural and philosophical ideas that were emerging at the turn of the 19th–20th century, in many cases contradictory: the overcoming of the rationalist ideas of the Enlightenment and the move towards more subjective and individual concepts, starting with the Romantic movement and crystallising in the work of authors such as Kierkegaard and Nietzsche, represent a break with tradition and a rejection of classical beauty. The concept of reality was questioned by the new scientific theories: the subjectivity of time (Bergson), Einstein's relativity, quantum mechanics, Freud's theory of psychoanalysis, etc. On the other hand, the new technologies changed the function of art, since photography and cinema were already in charge of capturing reality. All these factors produced the genesis of the new trends in contemporary art: abstract art, action and conceptual art, ephemeral art, where the artist no longer tries to reflect reality, but his inner world, to express his feelings.

In the 20th century, movements such as futurism exalted the ephemeral nature of art, with Marinetti writing that "nothing seems to me more base and petty than to think of immortality in creating a work of art" (Futurism, 1911). Even the visionary architect Antonio Sant'Elia advocated building houses that "would last less than the architects" (Manifesto of Futurist Architecture, 1914). A new sensibility thus emerged whereby works of art acquired an autonomy of their own, evolving and transforming over time in parallel with the viewer's perception of them. In this context, the artist is merely an artificer who sets the conditions for the work to follow its own destiny.

Contemporary art is intimately linked to society, to the evolution of social concepts, such as mechanicism and the devaluation of time and beauty. It is an art that stands out for its instantaneousness, it needs little time for perception. Today's art has continuous oscillations of taste, it changes simultaneously: just as classical art was based on a metaphysics of immutable ideas, today's art, with its Kantian roots, finds taste in the social awareness of pleasure (mass culture). In a more materialistic, more consumerist society, art addresses itself to the senses, not the intellect. Thus the concept of fashion, a combination of the speed of communication and the consumerist aspect of today's civilisation, became particularly relevant. The speed of consumption wears down the work of art, causing taste to oscillate, which loses its universality and personal tastes predominate. Thus, the latest artistic trends have even lost interest in the artistic object: traditional art was an art of the object, today's art is an art of the concept. There is a revaluation of active art, of action, of spontaneous, ephemeral, non-commercial art.

Finally, it is noteworthy that the perception of the ephemeral is not appreciated in the same way in Western art as in other fields and other cultures, in the same way that not all civilisations have the same concept of art. One of the countries where the fleeting and momentary character of life and its cultural representations is most highly valued is Japan; art in Japanese culture has a great sense of introspection and of the interrelation between human beings and nature, represented equally in the objects that surround them, from the most ornate and emphatic to the most simple and everyday. This is evident in the value given to imperfection, to the ephemeral nature of things, and to the emotional sense that the Japanese establish with their surroundings. Thus, for example, in the tea ceremony, the Japanese value the calm and tranquillity of this state of contemplation that they achieve with a simple ritual, based on simple elements and a harmony that comes from an asymmetrical and unfinished space. For the Japanese, peace and harmony are associated with warmth and comfort, qualities which in turn reflect their concept of beauty. Even when it comes to eating, it is not the quantity of food or its presentation that matters, but the sensory perception of the food and the aesthetic sense they attach to it, as they do to any act.

== Public awareness ==
Temporary art has been a way to introduce the public to art. The installation of temporary art is also used in conjunction with events or festivals. Occasionally temporary art can be used to raise public awareness or it can be used to create fleeting beauty. Occasionally it is displayed in unexpected places.

Occasionally events or festivals will invite temporary art. The 2022 International Nature and Environment Festival is coupled with a Trash Art International Festival in Gödöllő Hungary. It is an example of a film festival which invites temporary art with an environmental theme.

== Southern Hemisphere ==
The mid to late 1970s saw a flurry of ephemeral (temporary art) conceptual art, intervention art, performance art and environmental art in New Zealand mainly centered in Wellington but also in Auckland and Christchurch largely the work of students emerging from University art schools, the National art Gallery of New Zealand and the Artists co-op.

== Notable temporary art ==
- 1966 Yoko Ono's Apple - the exhibit is an apple on a piece of plexiglass. Ono has said, "There is the excitement of the apple decomposing, and then the decision whether or not to replace it, of just thinking of the beauty of the apple after it's gone."
- 1990 Damien Hirst created a work of art or installation which could be considered temporary: It was entitled A Thousand Years, and it was a large glass case containing maggots and flies feeding on a rotting cow's head.
- 2000's Brazilian sculptor Néle Azevedo places small human figures made of ice at landmarks. Some think the artist is making a statement about global warming. He has also used the melting figures to commemorate World War 1.
- 2011 sculptor Urs Fischer created an untitled wax sculpture. Over the course of five months the sculpture melted.
- 2015 Hungarian artist Ervin Hervé-Lóránth constructs temporary giant human figures out of polystyrene (see popped up) and calls them works of "public surprise".
- Banksy is an example of an artist who creates temporary art. Much of it takes the form of Graffiti which is seen by many people before being removed by municipalities or ruined by other graffiti. Sometimes his works are removed by others in order to sell. A famous piece of temporary art by Banksy was a framed piece which was auctioned by Sotheby's and was shredded shortly after purchase.

== See also ==
- Ephemeral architecture
- Spanish Baroque ephemeral architecture
- Falla monuments are satirical sculptures burnt in the Fallas festival of Valencia, Spain
- Sand mandala
- Sawdust carpet
- Flower carpet
- Floral design

== Bibliography ==
- Azcárate Ristori, José María de; Pérez Sánchez, Alfonso Emilio; Ramírez Domínguez, Juan Antonio (1983). Historia del Arte. Anaya, Madrid. ISBN 84-207-1408-9.
- Chilvers, Ian (2007). Diccionario de arte. Alianza publisher, Madrid. ISBN 978-84-206-6170-4.
- Dempsey, Amy (2002). Estilos, escuelas y movimientos. Blume, Barcelona. ISBN 84-89396-86-8.
- Eco, Umberto (2004). Historia de la belleza. Lumen, Barcelona. ISBN 84-264-1468-0.
- Fernández Arenas, José (1988). Arte efímero y espacio estético. Anthropos, Barcelona. ISBN 84-7658-078-9.
- Giorgi, Rosa (2007). El siglo XVII. Electa, Barcelona. ISBN 978-84-8156-420-4.
- González, Antonio Manuel (1991). Las claves del arte. Últimas tendencias. Planeta, Barcelona. ISBN 84-320-9702-0.
- Martínez Muñoz, Amalia (2001). Arte y arquitectura del siglo XX. Vol. II: La institucionalización de las vanguardias. Ed. Montesinos. ISBN 84-95580-14-4.
- Souriau, Étienne (1998). Diccionario Akal de Estética. Akal, Madrid. ISBN 84-460-0832-7.
- Stanley-Baker, Joan (2000). Arte japonés. Destino, Madrid. ISBN 84-233-3239-X.
- Tatarkiewicz, Władysław (2000). Historia de la estética I. La estética antigua. Akal, Madrid. ISBN 84-7600-240-8.
- Tatarkiewicz, Władysław (2002). Historia de seis ideas. Tecnos, Madrid. ISBN 84-309-3911-3.
