= Ervin Hervé-Lóránth =

Hungarian visual artist

- Born: 15 January 1969 (age 56); Szeged, Hungarian People's Republic
- Occupation: Artist
- Years active: 1999–present
- Known for: Giant human sculptures
- Notable work: Feltépve (2014)
- Website: Official website

Ervin Hervé-Lóránth (born 15 January 1969), often known mononymously as Hervé, is a Hungarian visual artist and creator of several Hungarian and international art exhibitions. He currently serves as a cultural attaché of Hungary. He is also a cultural anthropologist, and an interior architect. The sculptures have been referred to as temporary art, but Hervé-Lóránth refers to his outdoor sculptures as "public surprises".

== Early life ==
Hervé-Lóránth was born on 15 January 1969. In 1999 he established the Hervé Design School of Art and Media. In 2010 he started his own gallery, which he named the Hervé Gallery.

== Sculptures ==
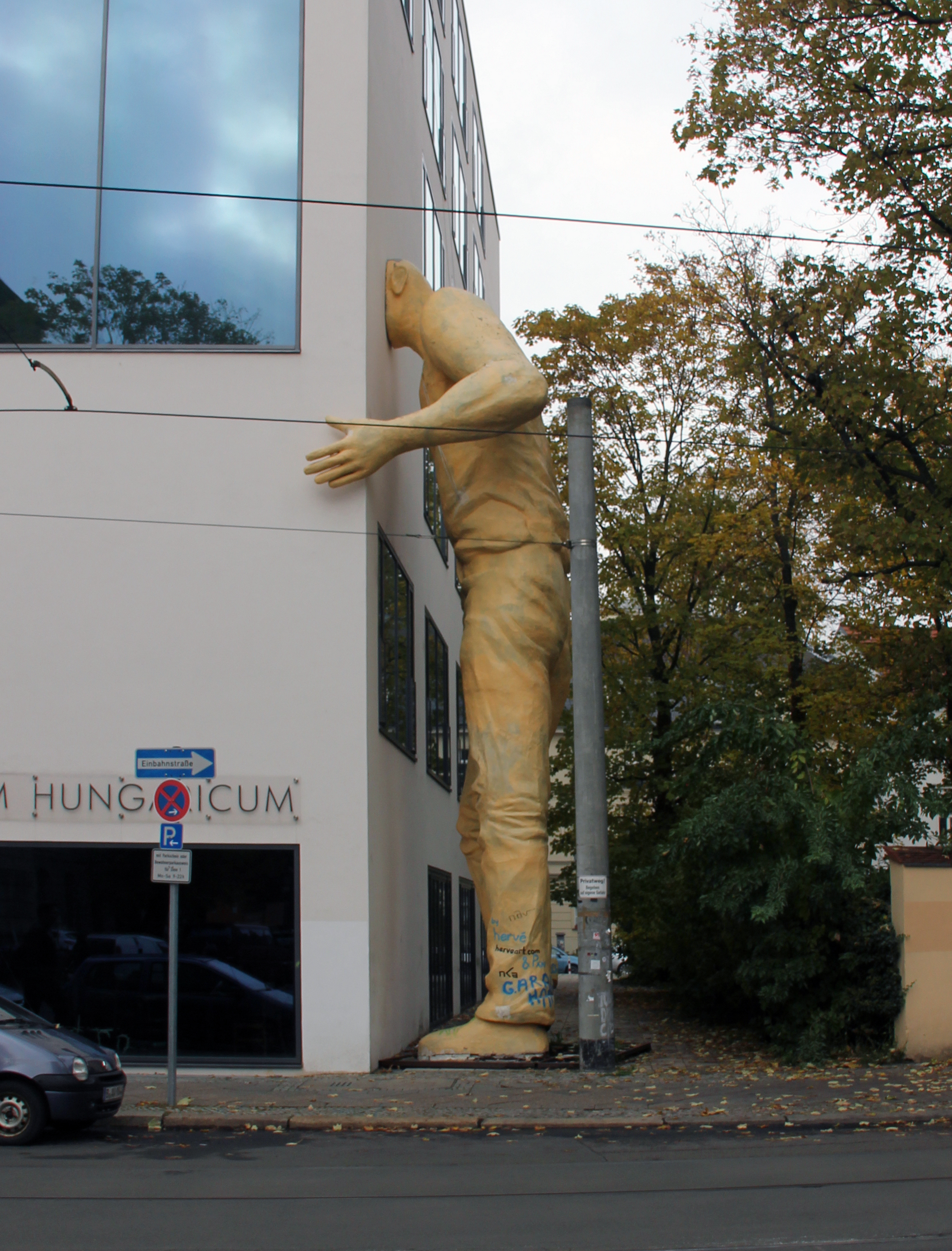
Riese (What's Up), installed in Berlin in 2015

Hervé-Lóránth often displays temporary sculptures in public places, often giant human figures. He calls his works "public surprise". In 2014 Ervin created a giant temporary outdoor sculpture titled Feltépve (Ripped Up). The work was displayed in Széchenyi Square in Budapest. The sculpture was a collaboration between Hervé-Lóránth and Gallery Out of Home. It was considered temporary because it was made from polystyrene." The sculpture portrayed an angry-faced giant who appears to be waking up and emerging from the ground. The exhibit invited visitors to interact and take selfies with the artwork.

In 2015 Herve exhibited a four-ton 7.5-metre-tall (25 ft) sculpture modeled after Robert Capa's photograph The Falling Soldier. The statue, displayed in Széchenyi Square, Budapest, depicted a seated soldier with his head tilted back as if he had been shot.

In 2018, Hervé-Lóránth placed a giant polystyrene human figure in the Piazza del Popolo in Capena, ( ROMA). It was a 9-metre (30 ft) sculpture of a man leaning on a ruined wall. The face of the figure was not distinguishable.

== Reception ==
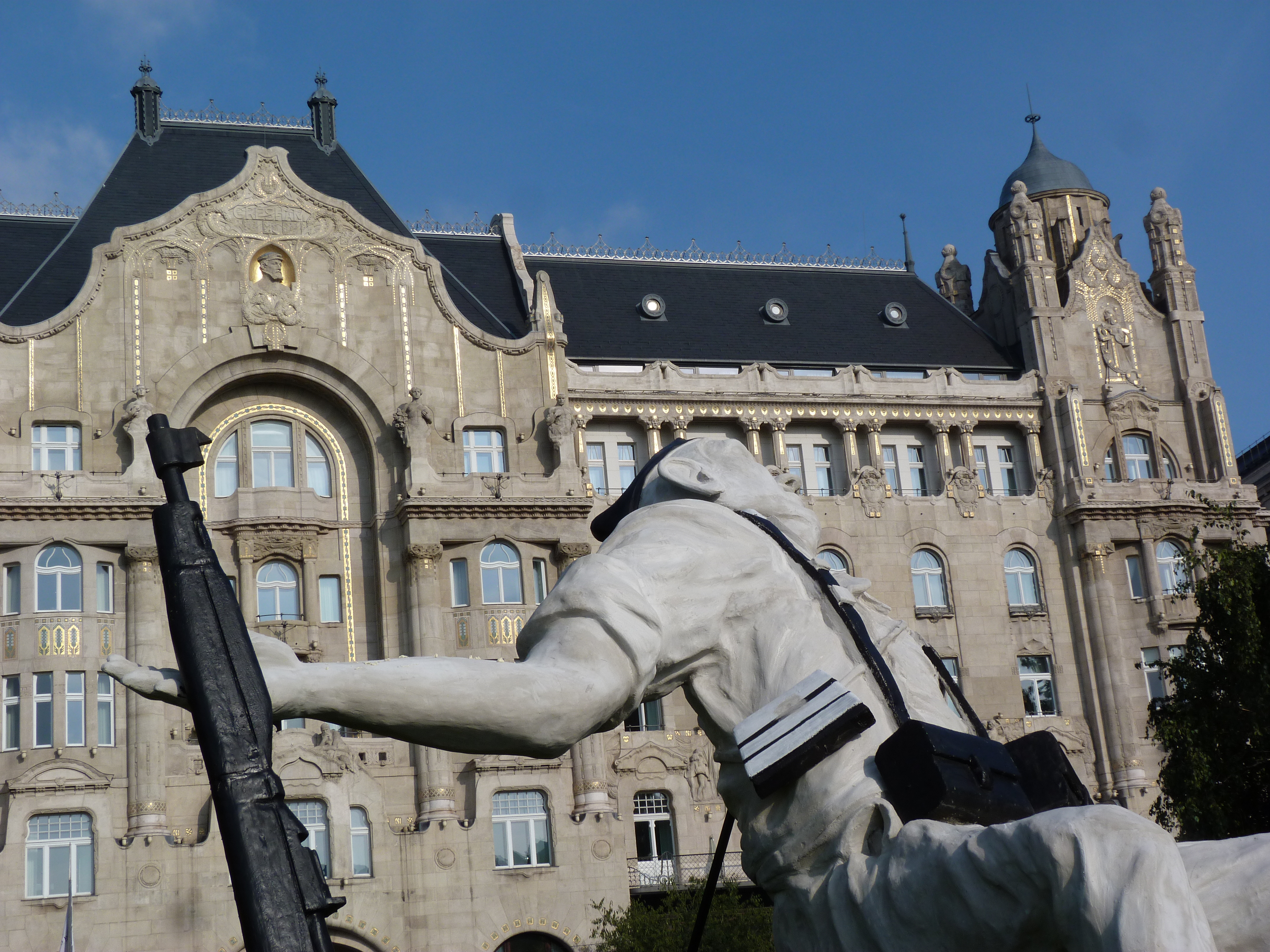
Hervé-Lóránth's 2015 sculpture modelled after The Falling Soldier. The sculpture was criticized and later destroyed.

In 2014, Hervé-Lóránth's sculpture Strappato (Popped Up) received an award for the best artwork in the world placed in a public area. The sculpture was featured in Architectural Digest's list of the 28 "most fascinating public sculptures".

Hervé-Lóránth's 2015 statue inspired by Capa's The Falling Soldier received criticism. Karip Timi, writing for Index, called the sculpture a "crappy giant". Origo stated that "consensus among the commentators was that the statue was ugly". The sculpture was later demolished.
