= Ovanir Buosi =

Ovanir Buosi is a Brazilian clarinetist. He plays with the São Paulo State Symphony Orchestra.

== Early life and education ==
Buosi was born in São Paulo, Brazil. He studied with Sergio Burgani at the São Paulo State University, graduating in 1997. He joined the São Paulo State Symphony Orchestra shortly after graduation. He studied with Michael Collins at the Royal College of Music in 2002.

== Career ==
He performed with London Winds at the Cheltenham Festival, in recordings for BBC Radio 3, and the 2004 BBC Proms. He was a member of the Southbank Sinfonia in 2004. He recorded with the Curitiba Wind Quintet.

Buosi plays on a Peter Eaton International model clarinet.

== Discography ==
- Villa-Lobos: Choros Vol 3, with São Paulo State Symphony Orchestra and Chorus. Bis, 2008.
- Villa-Lobos: Complete Choros & Bachianas Brasileiras, with various artists. Bis, 2009.

== Awards and recognitions ==
Buosi has won the Brazil Young Soloists Competition, the Weril Wind Prize, the Eldorado Music Prize and the RadioMEC Young Soloists National Competition.
