= Feltépve =

2014 outdoor sculpture in Budapest

- Feltépve on display in 2014
- Interactive map of Feltépve
- Location: Széchenyi Square, Budapest Hungary
- Coordinates: 47.499722°N 19.047222°E
- Designer: Ervin Herve Loranth
- Material: Polystyrene
- Completion date: 2014
- Opening date: 2014; 12 years ago
- Dedicated to: Freedom
- Website: Official website

Feltépve (Ripped Up or Popped Up) was a 2014 outdoor temporary sculpture located in Széchenyi Square in Budapest, Hungary, by Ervin Hervé-Lóránth. The artwork depicted a giant man emerging from the earth, and was installed as part of the 2014 Art Market Budapest.

== Background ==
The art piece was displayed on the grounds of Gresham Palace during the Art Market Budapest Festival and subsequently obtained popularity on the Internet. The sculpture was constructed out of polystyrene. The artist has called the work a large-sized example of contemporary art.

== Sculpture ==
The sculpture was a collaboration between Artist Ervin Herve-Loranth and Gallery Out of Home. It was considered temporary due to its polystyrene material. The sculpture shows a giant with an angry face who appears to be waking up and coming out from under the earth. It is colored in shades of greys, imitating rock. The exhibit invited visitors to interact and take selfies.

Two interpretations of the piece were articulated by Gallery Out of Home: "The creation has several meanings, such as the symbolism of freedom, the desire to break free, the curiosity, and the dynamics of development." After the Art Market Budapest, the sculpture was displayed in 4 in Ulm, Germany to celebrate the 1989 revolution.

== Reception ==
In 2014 his work, also called “Strappato” (Popped up) received an award for "the best work in the world placed in the public area." Architectural Digest called the sculpture one of the 28 most fascinating public sculptures.
