= Gustavo Duarte =

Brazilian cartoonist and comics artist

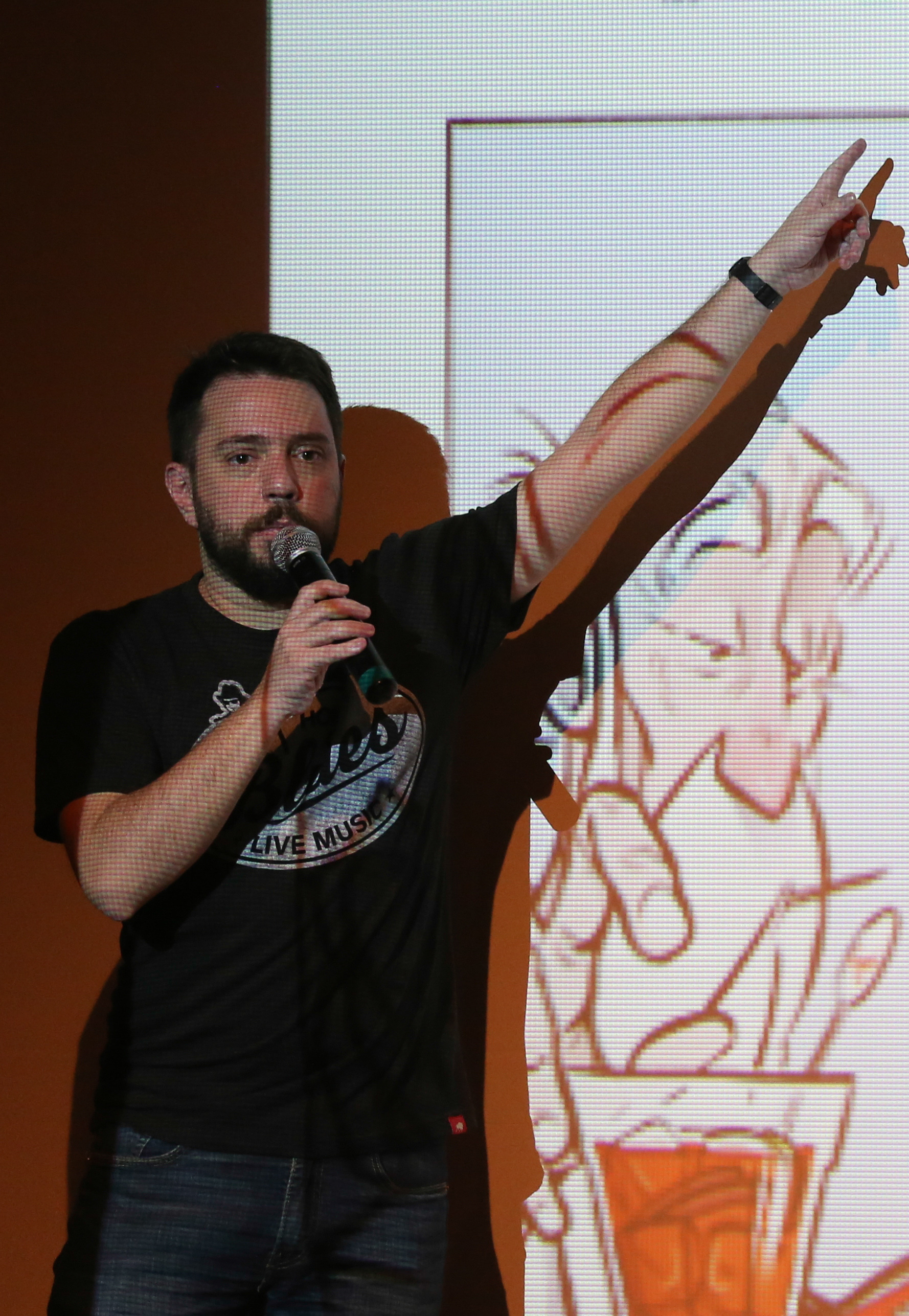

Gustavo Duarte (São Paulo, May 19, 1977) is a Brazilian comics artist. His work is known for his usually silent comics, which rely on the characters' body language.

== Early life and education ==
In 1999, Duarte graduated with a degree in Graphic Design from Unesp in Bauru.

== Career ==
During his studies, Duarte began working as an illustrator for the newspaper Diário de Bauru from 1997 to 1999. When he moved back to São Paulo in 2000, he worked as designer and illustrator for Editora Abril, while some of his work was also featured at Folha de S.Paulo and Lance! newspapers.

His first comic book, Có!, an independent publication, was awarded the Troféu HQ Mix of Best Independent Comic (Special Edition) in 2010. Duarte also received a prize for Best Artist-New Talent. Since Có, Duarte has published other comics, like Taxi, Birds, (both independent) and Monstros, his first work for a publishing house, Quadrinhos na Cia.

In 2014, Duarte's work debuted in the United States: Monstros, Có, and Birds were published by Dark Horse Comics as the single-volume Monsters and Other Stories. In the same year, Duarte drew Marvel 100th Anniversary: Guardians of the Galaxy #1. For DC Comics he worked on a Bizarro miniseries in 2015, written by Heath Corson and Dear Justice League (2019) (written by Michael Northrop) .

== Works ==
- Có!
- Taxi
- Monstros!
- Birds
- Chico Bento - Pavor Espaciar (Graphic MSP series)
- 13 (artbook)
- Monsters and Other Stories (anthology)
- Gwen Stacy: Kid Cop! (with Sean Ryan; 2020 comic book)
