= Sérgio Burgani =

Brazilian clarinetist

Sérgio Burgani is a Brazilian clarinetist.

Burgani teaches clarinet at São Paulo State University. He is a member of Sujeito a Guincho, a clarinet sextet based in São Paulo. Sujeito a Guincho received the Eldorado Award in 1996. Burgani is also the first clarinetist at the Orquestra Sinfônica do Estado de São Paulo - OSESP (São Paulo State Symphony Orchestra) which is considered the best orchestra from Latin America. He was a cocreator of the first professional-model clarinet from Brazil.

== Discography ==
- Sujeito a Guincho. 1997. Received the Sharp Music Award (Best Instrumental Album).
- Die Klarinetmaschine, with Sujeito a Guincho. 1999.
