= Bruna Caram =

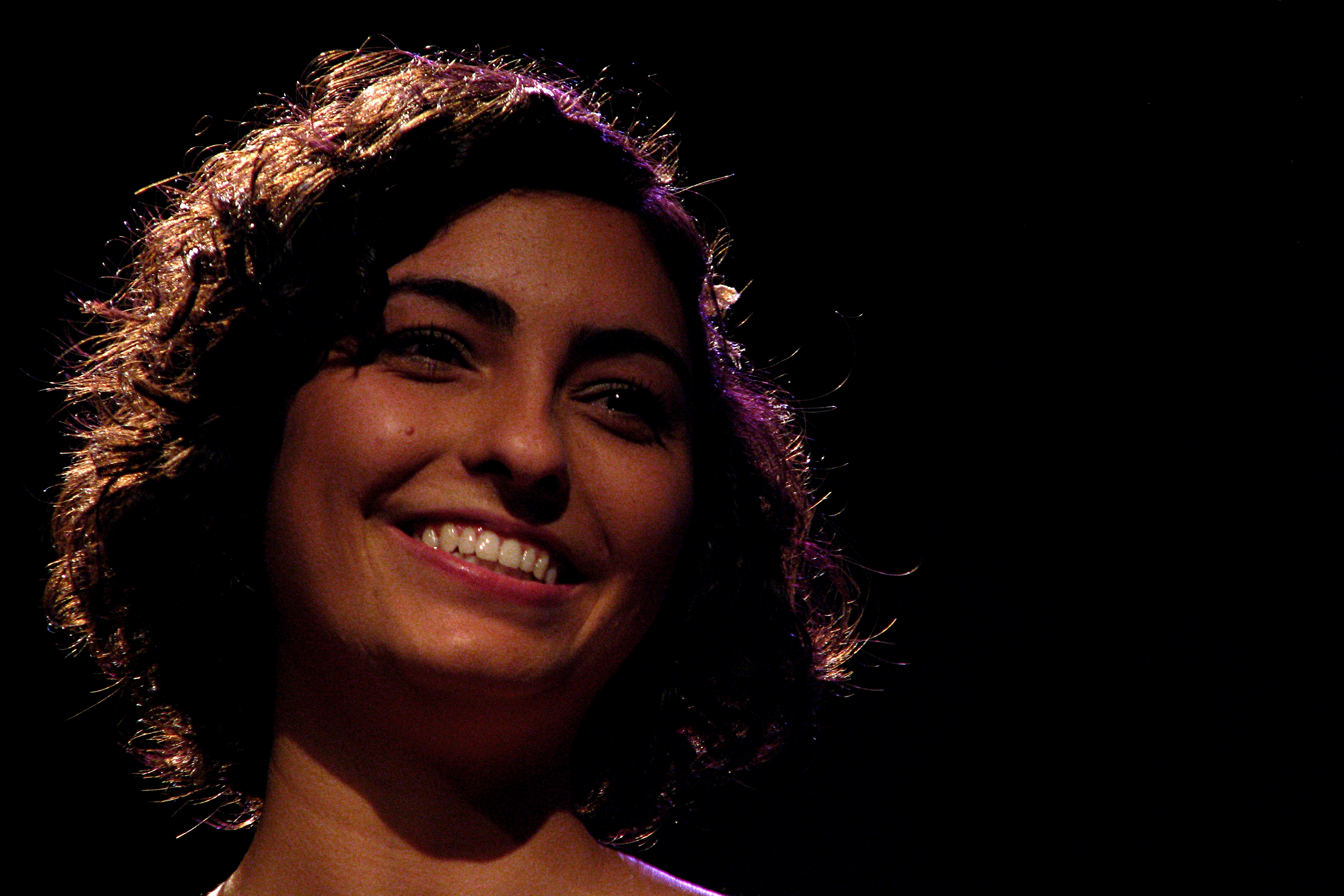
- Bruna Caram July 2009

Background information
- Born: July 26, 1987 (age 39); Avaré, São Paulo, Brazil
- Genres: MPB, bossa nova, samba
- Occupations: Singer, instrumentalist, musician, actress
- Years active: 2006–present
- Label: Dabliú Discos
- Website: brunacaram.com.br

Bruna Caram (born July 26, 1987) is a multi-instrumental Brazilian artist. She has been a singer for more than 20 years and is also a songwriter, composer, dancer and actress.

== Early life and education ==
Caram was born on July 26, 1987, in Avaré, a city in the southern State of São Paulo, Brazil. She grew up in a musical family and was surrounded by singers, composers and instrumentalists of different kinds: Her maternal grandmother, Maria Piedade was a radio singer in the '50s. Her paternal grandfather, Jamil Caram was a guitarist and she is the niece of Juca Novaes, a Brazilian singer and composer and the singers Ana Caram and Lucila Novaes.

She began studying piano at the age of seven. In 1996, when she was nine years old, Caram became part of the musical groups Trovadores Mirins and Trovadores Urbanos, subsequently. She stayed with the group, travelling and performing throughout Brazil, until she was 18 years old. At 14 years she started receiving formal vocal lessons and has been continuing them ever since.

In 2010, Caram received a degree in music from São Paulo State University (UNESP). In 2012 she began studying theatre and acting and has also been studying ballet for several years.

== Career ==
=== Music ===
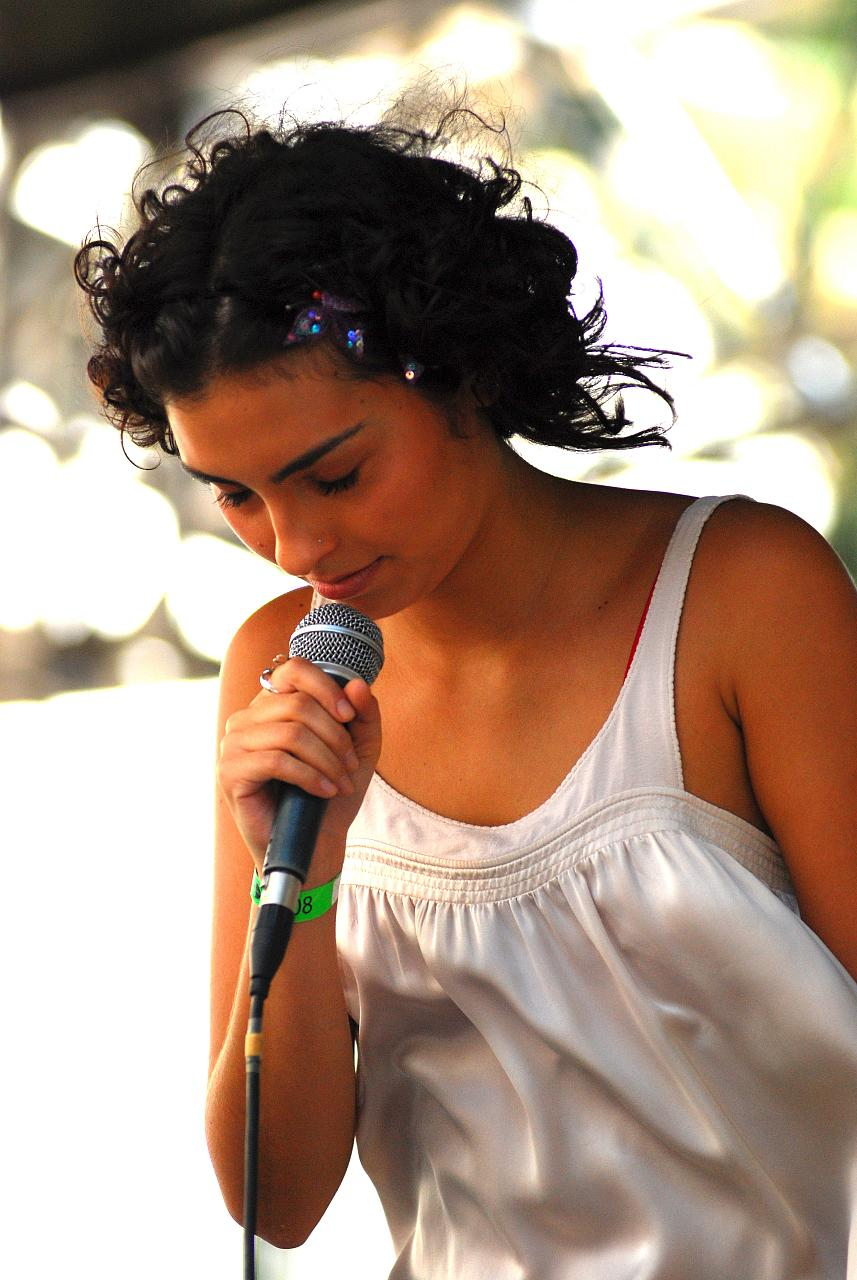
Caram performing (2008)

Caram started her solo-career as a singer with the release of her first album in December 2006. Essa Menina (This Girl) is a mixture of ballads, blues, pop and bossa nova. The songs were composed by Otávio Toledo and his musical partners, José Carlos Costa Netto and Juca Novaes. In Japan, the title track reached high on major radio playlists: among the 50 most played songs on radio J-Wave. The song Palavras do Coração (Words of the Heart) reached heavy rotation on Brazilian radio.

Her second album, Feriado Pessoa (Personal Holiday) was released in 2009. The title track was written by Caram. Other songs are written by Lô Borges (Quem Sabe Isso Quer Dizer Amor), Guilherme Arantes (Cuide-se Bem) and Caetano Veloso (Gatas Extraordinárias). The album features Samba music fused with melancholy lyrics: "I love sounds to cry, but I think the public is missing songs to feel good, to forget that grey and chaotic environment in which we live . It's music for a sunny day on vacation."

Caram's third album, Será Bem-Vindo Qualquer Sorriso (Will Welcome Any Smile) was released on November 16, 2012.

In early 2017 she released her fourth album Multialma, with all tracks written by Caram herself, and subsequently toured Brazil, the US, Portugal and Spain.

In 2018 Brazilian singer Anna Ratto released her fifth album, called Tantas, featuring musical compositions by Caram.

In the past Caram has categorized her music in the MPB Pop genre, but in an interview in 2015 shared that she tries do not fit into a fixed musical genre too narrowly: "I want to be free to go through different influences without having to justify myself", she stated.

==== Live shows ====
"Esquenta 90" is a live performance show that Caram launched in 2018. In it she presents a mix, combining her own songs and tracks that shaped her generation and her own musical development.

In the same year she also launched a musical project, called Projeto PRIMO, together with Lucas Caram and Paulo Novaes. All three are grandchildren of Maria Piedade, a Brazilian singer, who inspired their musical development. The show has been dubbed "an unprecedented family gathering on stage".

=== Acting ===
Caram made her debut as an actress in 2017, starring on Rede Globo in the miniseries Dois Irmãos. Throughout the series she played the character Rania, appearing in five out of a total of 10 episodes. The show was nominated for awards in four different categories and won three of the four.

For the show Caram was initially approached via Facebook by director Luiz Fernando Carvalho.

=== Writing ===
In 2015 Caram released her first book with poems, titled "Little Passion Poetry". The release of the book was followed by a tour, in which she combined music and poetry.

== Works ==
Bruna Caram discography
- Studio albums: 5

=== Albums ===
Year	Album	Album details	BRA Certification / Sales
2006	Essa Menina	1st studio album	25,000
2009	Feriado Pessoal	2nd studio album	20,000
2012	Será Bem-Vindo Qualquer Sorriso	3rd studio album	
2016	Multialma	4th studio album	
2019	Alívio	5th studio album	

=== Singles ===
Year	Single	Album	BRA Hot 100	BRA Year End
2006	"Palavras do coracao"	Essa Menina	–	–
2006	"Essa Menina"	Essa Menina	–	–
2009	"Nascer de novo"	Feriado Pessoal	–	–
2009	"Fim de tarde"	Feriado Pessoal	–	–

== Awards ==
In 2005 Caram won the award 'Festival Interunesp 2005 de Ilha Solteira'.

== Personal life ==
Caram lives in São Paulo. She has a Lebanese background.

Besides vocals Caram also plays accordion, piano, guitar and cavaquinho and usually carries a notebook with her to write down lyrical inspirations.

Asked about important influences and examples, Caram mentions Maria Bethânia, Elis Regina, Ney Matogrosso, Elba Ramaloh, Liza Minnelli and Édith Piaf.
