= Edson Zampronha =

Brazilian composer

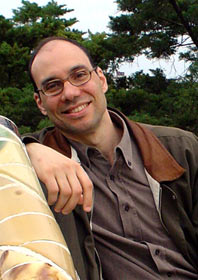
- Occupation: Composer

Edson Zampronha (born June 2, 1963) is a Brazilian composer dedicated to contemporary experimental music. His works include pieces for orchestra, symphonic band, electroacoustic music, chamber music, sound installations, interactive works and music for films. His music makes an extensive use of rhetoric strategies to create new forms of musical tensions and musical discourses. His research focus on musical signification and it takes semiotics, music theory and technology as backgrounds.

== Biography ==
Edson Zampronha was born in Rio de Janeiro into a family of musicians. He started out his musical training at a young age at home. His first lessons included musical composition, history of music, theory, harmony, counterpoint and musical analysis, besides piano playing. His family moved from Rio de Janeiro to São Paulo in 1969. In 1978 he was introduced into electroacoustic music composition, and his first experiments were done in a four-channel Revox tape recorder.

In 1983 he starts the course on Music Composition and Conducting at the São Paulo State University. In 1991 he concludes a Master Degree in Musical Composition at the Federal University of Rio de Janeiro, and in 1992 he starts a large and fruitful period as a professor of musical composition at the São Paulo State University. In 1998 he concludes the Doctorate on Communication and Semiotics – Arts, at the Pontifical Catholic University of São Paulo, where he first applied semiotic tools for music composition.

As of 1999 he starts an international agenda. He has been invited composer as the Laboratory for Musical Informatics and Electronics at the Center for Diffusion of Contemporary Music (LIEM-CDMC, Madrid); the Phonos Foundation at the Pompeu Fabra University (Barcelona), and the Electroacoustic Music Studios of the University of Birmingham (England). He has developed two post-doctorate researches on music and meaning, one at the University of Helsinki (Finland), in 2000, and another one at the University of Valladolid (Spain), in 2005. During this period his concept of re-interpretation applied to musical form was first used.

Since the 1990s he has received commissions from different groups and institutions, as from the Museum for Applied Arts, Cologne (Germany); from the Mexican Center for Music and Sound Arts CMMAS in México, and from the São Paulo State Symphonic Band for the 100th Anniversary of Sao Paulo State Art Gallery, in 2005 (São Paulo, Brazil).

In 2006 one of the leading classic music labels in Brazil, Clássicos, releases a CD fully dedicated to his compositions for piano, for the first time including a CD dedicated to contemporary music in their collection.

In 2008 he interrupts a sequence of 16 years as a professor of musical composition at the São Paulo State University. He transferred his residency to León (Spain) and started a new period of musical composition and research.

== Work ==
One of the keywords in the music of Zampronha is "re-interpretation" (or re-signification), understood as the act of understanding in a different way what had been previously listened to. This re-interpretation can be exemplified in three different aspects of his work.

This re-interpretation appears clearly in his use of musical rhetoric resources. Zampronha's main rhetoric strategy is first to induce the listener to understand the musical discourse in a specific way. Then, during the development of the work this understanding surprisingly changes to another one. There is a change of meaning in what we listen to. However, the first meaning never completely disappears. Thus, the old and the new understandings overlap, creating tension that becomes the axis of the composition.

Another aspect of this re-interpretation can be found in the use of sound materials and their references. A sound material can make references to a specific musical context or a specific historical period (even a very recent period) without being a quotation. When inserted in a different context (the musical work is this new context), a polyphony between references appears: something new dialogues with something known; the displacement of a reference from its original context create musical tensions, and the meaning and values these references carry out give a historical and contextual perspective to the sound materials.

Concerning his harmonic language, Zampronha uses non-traditional but intelligible chords comprising many notes (from 6 to 18, or even more). Each chord concentrates a specific sensation or emotion in itself. These chords are unities that are fragmented by the use of specific extra-notes. In this sense, the concept of dissonance is re-interpreted. Specific sequences of these chords may generate a new-functionality producing directionalities inside the work.

Different aspects of his compositions reflect these innovations, as the musical notation he uses and the relationship between instruments and electroacoustics for instance.

== Recordings ==
His work is included in many CDs released by different labels and institutions. Three CDs are fully dedicated to his works:

Sonora – It includes the following works:

- Trazo (Norberto Magín, accordion)
- The feathers' singing (electroacoustics)
- Composition for Piano II (Edson Zampronha, piano)
- Two Takes (Fabio Presgrave, violoncello)
- Composition for Piano IV (Edson Zampronha, piano)
- Elegía (Elisa Tejedor, violoncello / Edson Zampornha, electroacoustics)
- Modelagem IX (Juliana Marín, piano)
- Toccata II (María Cuadriello Díaz, percussion)

Sensibile – Performed by Attilio Mastrogiovanni, this CD includes the works:

- Fragmentos Reduzidos de uma História Muito Longa (Reduced Fragments of a Very Large Story);
- Composição Para Piano a Quatro Mãos e Dois Comentários (Composition for Piano Four Hands and Two Comments) – performed with the special guest Achille Picchi
- Prelúdio (Prelude)
- Figuração Interpretada (Interpreted Figuration)
- Concerto para Piano e Sons Eletroacústicos (Concert for Piano and Electroacoustic Sounds)
- Bonus Track: Composição para Piano III (Composition for Piano III) – performed by Edson Zampronha.

Modelagens – It includes the following works:

- Modelagem XII (Sinfonia Cultura Orchestra, conducted by Lutero Rodrigues)
- Modelagem II (Beatriz Balzi, piano)
- O Crescimento da Árvore sobre a Montanha (The Growth of a Tree on a Mountain) (Electroacoustic work)
- Modelagem III (Celina Charlier, flute)
- Mármore (Marble) – for tuba y electroacoustics (Jesús Jara, tuba)
- Modelagem VIII – for percussion and computer (Eduardo Gianesella, percussion)
- Fragmentation (electroacoustic works).

S'io esca vivo – Performed by Karin Fernandes and special guests, this CD includes:

- Lamento (Karin Fernandes, piano)
- S'io esca vivo (Karin Fernandes, piano)
- Ciaccona (Karin Fernandes, piano; Ricardo Bologna, percussion)
- Fantasia (Ana de Oliveira, vl; Adriana Holtz, vc; Luis Afonso Montanha, cl; Karin Fernandes, piano)
- Composição para Piano VII (Composition for Piano VII) (Karin Fernandes, piano)
- Feroce (Adriana Holtz, cello; Karin Fernandes, piano)

== Books ==
Edson Zampronha has published the book:

- Notação, Representação e Composição (Notation, Representation and Composition) - São Paulo: Annablume, 2000 – in Portuguese.

This book is a demonstration of the capital importance of writing in the process of musical composition.

Edson Zampronha and Dr. Maria de Lourdes Sekeff have published the book series

- Arte e Cultura – Estudos Interdisciplinares (Art and Culture – Interdisciplinary Studies) – São Paulo: Annablume, in Portuguese, including four volumes at this moment.

This series is a collection of essays signed by outstanding artists-researches from the most important Brazilian Universities.

== Awards ==
Edson Zampronha has been awarded by some of the most important prizes in Brazil:

- He was awarded twice by the São Paulo Associations of Art Criticism, Brazil, for his works Toccata II (best solo work of 1993) and Modelagem VII (best ensemble work of 1997).
- In 2005 he was the winner of the 6º Sergio Motta Award, the most important Brazilian prize for art and technology, for his sound installations Atrator Poético (Poetic Attractor), created with Grupo SCIArts.

== Works ==
Edson Zampronha's catalog of compositions includes more than 100 compositions for orchestra, electroacoustic music, opera, sound installations, and chamber music. Some of his works are:

- Elegía (Elegy), for cello and electroacoustics (2009)
- Two Takes, for cello (2008)
- Ceremonia de Boda (Wedding Ceremony), for ensemble (2008)
- Inverno (Winter), for string orchestra and harpsichord or piano (2007)
- Tríptico (Triptych), for guitar (2007)
- Recycling, Collaging, Sampling – for 1 to 6 percussionists and electroacoustic sounds (2000–2006)
- Viaje al Interior (Travel to Inward), electroacoustic work (2006)
- Convergenza Sensibile (Sensitive Convergence), for orchestra (2006)
- Diante do Abismo (In Front of the Abyss), for Symphonic Band (2005)
- Composição para Piano a Quatro Mãos e Dois Comentários (Composition for Piano Four Hands and Two Comments), for piano four hands (1985–2005)
- Atrator Poético (Poetic Attractor), sound installation created with the SCIArts Group (2005)
- Lamenti, electroacoustic work (2004)
- Concerto para Piano e Sons Eletroacústicos (Concert for Piano and Electroacoustic Sounds) (2003–2004)
- Figuração Interpretada (Interpreted Figuration), for piano (2003)
- Perfurando a Linha (Drilling the Line), for viola (2002)
- Fragmentos Reduzidos de uma História Muito Longa (Reduced Fragmentos of a Very Large Story), for piano (2002)
- Modelagem XII, for orchestra (1999–2001)
- Evolon, for ensemble (1999)
- Modelagem X-a, for vibraphone (1997)
- Toccata II, for one percussionist (1992-3)
- Composição para Músicos e Atores (Composition for Musicians and Actors), Opera including chamber orchestra, chamber choir, percussions ensemble and two actors (1986)
- Composição para Piano III (Composition for Piano III) (1984)
