= São Paulo State University =

Public university in São Paulo, Brazil

- Universidade Estadual Paulista "Júlio de Mesquita Filho"
- Other name: Unesp
- Type: Public university system
- Established: 1976
- Affiliations: Compostela Group of Universities
- Budget: R$1.496 billion
- Rector: Pasqual Barretti (2021–2025)
- Academic staff: 3,316
- Administrative staff: 7,138
- Students: 47,917
- Undergraduates: 35,284
- Postgraduates: 12,633
- Location: Araçatuba, Araraquara, Assis, Bauru, Botucatu, Dracena, Franca, Guaratinguetá, Ilha Solteira, Itapeva, Jaboticabal, Marília, Ourinhos, Presidente Prudente, Registro, Rio Claro, Rosana, São João da Boa Vista, São José do Rio Preto, São José dos Campos, São Paulo, São Vicente, Sorocaba and Tupã, São Paulo, Brazil; 22.8172°S 47.0694°W
- Website: unesp.br

São Paulo State University (Unesp, Portuguese: Universidade Estadual Paulista "Júlio de Mesquita Filho") is a public university run by the state government of São Paulo, Brazil.

Unesp has a combined student body of over 45,000 spread among its 23 campuses. The first of them is the Araraquara Pharmacy and Odontology Faculty, founded in 1923 and incorporated by the state of São Paulo in 1956. Before the university's official foundation in 1976, its original 12 campuses were public independent faculties.

With a budget of R$2.6 billion in 2015, UNESP currently has 33 teaching, research, and extension units in 23 campuses spread across inland and coastal cities, as well as in the city of São Paulo. It also has 30 libraries, two hospitals, three animal hospitals, five farms, and seven complementary units.

São Paulo State University is considered the sixth most important university in Brazil, according to the Ranking Universitário Folha, one of the most recognized local rankings. According to the QS World University Ranking, Unesp is the fifth most important university in Brazil, 11th in Latin America, 29th in BRICS, and 482nd in the world. It is the only Brazilian member of the Compostela Group of Universities.

== History ==
Universities in Brazil are a recent phenomenon, compared to other Latin American countries. The first one was created in 1808 (Rio de Janeiro Medicine Faculty). Before the 20th century, there were no universities in the country. Existing institutions in higher education were either public or church-run independent institutes. Rio de Janeiro Federal University was the first one, containing every faculty inside Rio de Janeiro city in 1926.

São Paulo's first university was USP, founded in 1933. By the 1950s, countryside people had to move toward capitals for undergraduate study. There were few higher education institutes outside Brazilian metropolises then. São Paulo state government created many colleges outside the capital in the 1950s and 1960s. Prominent cities in the state received these isolated institutes, known as “Faculdade de Filosofia”. In the 1970s, discussions were made within state government on how to coordinate the separate institutes. One Suggestions was to join the 14 institutes in a federation or a single university, which was enacted on subsequently.

Inspired by the University of California multi-campus system, Unesp was founded in 1976. The original campuses were in Araçatuba, Araraquara, Assis, Botucatu, Franca, Guaratinguetá, Ilha Solteira, Jaboticabal, Marília, Presidente Prudente, Rio Claro, São José dos Campos, São José do Rio Preto and São Paulo. Bauru campus was incorporated in 1988.

The name "Universidade Estadual Paulista" was suggested by the first rector of Unesp, Professor Luiz Ferreira Martins. The homage to Júlio de Mesquita Filho (a journalist) was suggested by Prof. Dr. Moacyr Expedito Marret Vaz Guimarães, then President of the State Council of Education (EEC).

Unesp is one of the six public higher education institutions in the state of São Paulo. The others are USP, UNICAMP, UNIFESP, UFABC, UFSCar and FATEC).

== Facilities ==
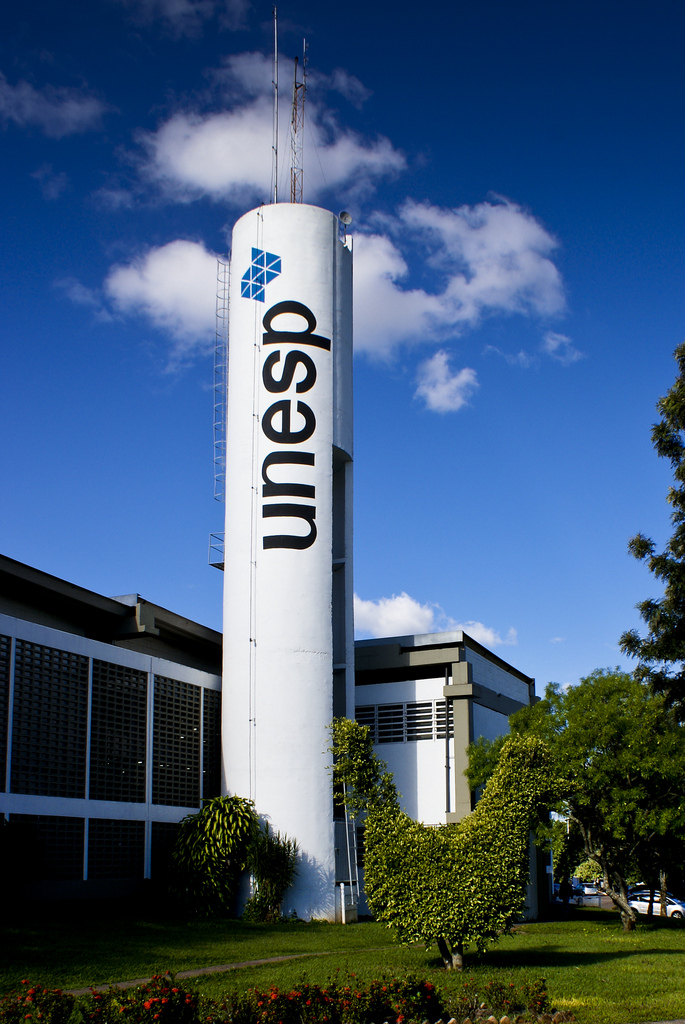
Campus Marília

UNESP has a total of 1,900 laboratories and 30 libraries, which together have around 900,000 books available.

In addition the facilities encompass museums, gardens, parks, botanical gardens and five experimental farms, totaling an area of 62.8 million m^{2}, of which 745,400 m^{2} are developed area.

The university also owns the Hospital de Clínicas de Botucatu and manages the State Hospital of Bauru, which together have around 800 beds, as well as veterinary hospitals and dentistry, psychology, speech therapy and physiotherapy clinics.

Map of the state of São Paulo with districts that are home to a campus of UNESP.

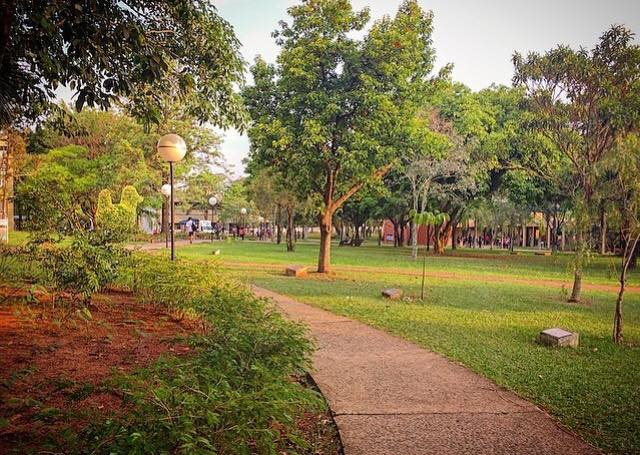
Campus Marília

=== Campuses ===
São Paulo State University has 23 campuses and 33 institutes:

- Araçatuba Campus
  - Faculdade de Odontologia de Araçatuba (FOA) (Araçatuba Dental School)
  - Faculdade de Medicina Veterinária (FMV) (Faculty of Veterinary Medicine)
- Araraquara Campus
  - Faculdade de Ciências Farmacêuticas (FCF) (Faculty of Pharmaceutical Sciences)
  - Faculdade de Ciências e Letras (FCL) (Faculty of Science and Letters)
  - Faculdade de Odontologia (FO) (Dental School)
  - Instituto de Química (IQ) (Institute of Chemistry)
- Assis Campus
  - Faculdade de Ciências e Letras (FCL) (Faculty of Science and Letters)
- Bauru Campus
  - Faculdade de Arquitetura, Artes e Comunicação (FAAC) (Faculty of Architecture, Arts and Communication)
  - Faculdade de Ciências (FC) (Faculty of Sciences)
  - Faculdade de Engenharia de Bauru (FEB) (Bauru School of Engineering)
- Botucatu Campus
  - Faculdade de Ciências Agronômicas (FCA) (Faculty of Agricultural Sciences)
  - Faculdade de Medicina (FM) (Medical School)
  - Faculdade de Medicina Veterinária e Zootecnia (FMVZ) (Faculty of Veterinary Medicine and Animal Science)
  - Instituto de Biociências de Botucatu (IBB) (Institute of Biosciences of Botucatu)
- Campus Experimental de Dracena (Experimental Campus of Dracena)
- Franca Campus
  - Faculdade de Ciências Humanas e Sociais (FCHS) (Faculty of Humanities and Social Sciences)
- Guaratinguetá Campus
  - Faculdade de Engenharia de Guaratinguetá (FEG) (Guaratinguetá School of Engineering)
- Ilha Solteira Campus
  - Faculdade de Engenharia de Ilha Solteira (FEIS) (Ilha Solteira School of Engineering)
- Campus Experimental de Itapeva (Experimental Campus of Itapeva)
- Jaboticabal Campus
  - Faculdade de Ciências Agrárias e Veterinárias (FCAV) (Faculty of Agricultural and Veterinary Sciences)
- Marília Campus
  - Faculdade de Filosofia e Ciências (FFC) (School of Philosophy and Sciences)
- Campus Experimental de Ourinhos (Experimental Campus of Ourinhos)
- Presidente Prudente, São Paulo|Presidente Prudente Campus
  - Faculdade de Ciências e Tecnologia (FCT) (Faculty of Science and Technology)
- Campus Experimental de Registro (Experimental Campus of Registro)
- Rio Claro Campus
  - Instituto de Biociências (IB) (Institute of Biosciences)
  - Instituto de Geociências e Ciências Exatas (IGCE) (Institute of Geosciences and Exact Sciences)
- Campus Experimental de Rosana (Experimental Campus of Rosana)
- São João da Boa Vista Campus
- São José do Rio Preto Campus
  - Instituto de Biociências, Letras e Ciências Exatas (IBILCE) (Institute of Biosciences, Arts and Exact Sciences)
- São José dos Campos Campus
  - Faculdade de Odontologia de São José dos Campos (FOSJC) (São José dos Campos Dental School)
- São Paulo Campus
  - Instituto de Artes (IA) (Institute of Arts)
  - Instituto de Física Teórica (IFT) (Institute for Theoretical Physics)
  - Núcleo de Educação a Distância (NEaD) (Center for Distance Education)
- Campus do Litoral Paulista (São Vicente) (Campus of São Paulo Coast)
  - Instituto de Biociências (Institute of Biosciences)
- Sorocaba Campus
- Campus Experimental de Tupã (Experimental Campus of Tupã)

=== Complementary units ===
- Unesp, Jaboticabal
  - Centro de Aquicultura da UNESP (CAUNESP) (UNESP's Centre for Aquiculture)
- Unesp, São Paulo
  - Instituto de Física Teórica (IFT) (Institute for Theoretical Physics)
- Unesp, São Vicente
  - Instituto de Estudos Avançados do Mar (IEAMar) (Institute of Advanced Sea Studies)

== Organization and administration ==
Unesp is governed by a rector, appointed by the state governor who chooses the final candidate from a list of three nominees. The nominees are selected through elections, taking place among university's academics held every four years. Usually, the governor selects the winner of those elections.

The rector presides over the University Council, composed of directors of every institute in the system and academic representatives. There are ten students representatives. The council makes most decisions that affect the university.

Each institute (there are campuses with more than one) has one director and a council who rules with a degree of autonomy.

=== Unesp rectors ===
- Luis Ferreira Martins (10/03/1976 – 09/03/1980)
- Armando Octávio Ramos (10/03/1980 – 08/03/1984)
- Manuel Nunes Dias (27/03/1984 – 31/07/1984), pro-tempore
- Jorge Nagle (01/08/1984 – 16/01/1989)
- Milton Barbosa Landim (17/01/1989 – 15/01/1993)
- Artur Roquete de Macedo (16/01/1993 – 14/01/1997)
- Antônio Manuel dos Santos Silva (15/01/1997 – 14/01/2001)
- José Carlos Souza Trindade (15/01/2001 – 14/01/2005)
- Marcos Macari (15/01/2005 – 14/01/2009)
- Herman Jacobus Cornelis Voorwald (15/01/2009 – 14/01/2013)
- Julio Cezar Durigan (since 15/01/2013–2017)
- Sandro Roberto Valentini (2017–2021)

== Academics ==
Unesp employs about 3,500 teachers, in addition to another 10,600 employees in various positions. The university provides 171 options for undergraduate courses in 62 higher education professions, with a total of over 45,000 students, of which 5,600 new professionals are trained annually by Unesp. About 10,000 students study in 118 postgraduate programs, with 117 academic masters, 6 professional masters and 93 academic doctorates.

The academic year at Unesp follows a two-semester schedule, with slight differences depending on the courses and programs chosen. The spring semester runs from August – December and the fall semester from February – June.

In the recent decade Brazil has generally become more widely recognized as a good academic environment (developing alongside the rest of the countries economy). But with the economic crisis some universities in Brazil have struggled in the last years; the number of publications authored and co-authored from UNESP however, has continually risen since 2012.

=== Admissions ===
Admissions to Unesp are restricted by a state-wide, general admissions exam, known as vestibular. For architecture, arts and design undergraduate courses, additional specific exams are required.

Prepared by VUNESP, an institution specialized in exams organization, Unesp vestibular are held on three days, separated in two phases.

1. The first phase consists of 90 questions in the following disciplines: philosophy, Portuguese, mathematics, chemistry, biology, geography, history, physics and English or Spanish.
2. The second phase of exams, separated in two days, is made up of specific questions in Humane and Natural Sciences on the first day. The second day of the second phase consists of specific questions in Languages (Portuguese and English or Spanish) and a writing exam.

A student can only apply for a single course in the São Paulo State University system, preventing a simultaneous application for e.g. History and Geography.

=== Exchange programmes ===
Unesp has 140 international exchange and cooperation agreements with institutions of higher education in 52 countries. The main exchange countries for Unesp are currently Argentina, Canada, China, France, Germany, Portugal, Spain, Russia, the United States and Scotland.

To further support international students the university launched a program called "International Courses" in 2013. The program comprised four different areas initially: Agricultural Sciences, Alternative Energy, Dentistry and Literature and Linguistics.

Overview of partnering universities
Country	Name of partnering university	Website
Germany	University of Duisburg-Essen	www.uni-due.de

=== Rankings and reputation ===
University rankings

Global – Overall
- ARWU World: 301–400 (2023)
- QS World: =419 (2024)
- THE World: 601–800 (2024)
- USNWR Global: =497 (2023)

Regional – Overall
- QS Latin America: 10 (2018)
- THE Latin America: 11 (2018)
- THE Emerging Economies: 161

National – Overall
- THE National: 4 (2018)

In 2012, Unesp ranked second among public universities in the "VIII Best Universities Award", annually presented by the student publication guide, Editora Abril.

In 2013, the UK publication Times Higher Education (THE) pointed to Unesp, alongside Unicamp, as one of the World's Top 100 "Young" Universities (under 50 years old) and as the 11th best university in emerging countries.

QS World University Rankings ranked the University of São Paulo as the 9th best in Latin America (2014), the 34th best in BRICS, the 4th best in Brazil, and within the 491-500th best universities worldwide in 2018.

The Academic Classification of World Universities (ARWU) of 2017 ranked Unesp in the 301st-400th group of the best universities in the world and as the third best institution of higher education in Brazil.

The institution was also ranked as the 8th best university in Latin America, the 4th in Brazil and the 408th in the world by the Webometrics Ranking of World Universities in 2017.

Unesp ranked in the 151-200th group of the Young University Rankings 2018 and in the 601-800th group of the World University Rankings 2018 by THE.

== Research ==
Research an Unesp is centrally organized by the Research Vice-President's office (PROPe). The university currently has its main research focus in the areas of Bioenergy, Biotechnology, Climate Change, Nanotechnology, Pharmaceutical Development and Technology, Pre-Clinical and Clinical development, Public Policy, Sea Sciences and Stem Cell research.

In 2010, UNESCO, an agency of the United Nations (UN), named Unesp as the 2nd university in Brazil in numbers of scientific articles of international level, being responsible for 8% of the national scientific production, alongside UNICAMP and second to USP.

== Noted people ==
=== Alumni ===
Notable alumni of Unesp include (Unesp degree in brackets):

- Néle Azevedo (1950), Brazilian sculptor and independent researcher (Visual Arts)
- Ana Maria Braga (April 1, 1949), Brazilian television presenter and journalist (Biology)
- Bruna Caram (July 26, 1987), Brazilian singer, songwriter and musician (Music)
- Rafael Coutinho (1980), Brazilian comics artist, painter and animator (Arts)
- Gustavo Duarte (May 19, 1977), Brazilian cartoonist and comics artist (Design)
- Edith Fanta, Brazilian Antarctic researcher (Zoology)
- Mauro Refosco, Brazilian percussionist (Percussion)
- Heleieth Saffioti (January 4, 1934 – December 13, 2010), Brazilian sociologist, teacher, and feminist activist (Social Sciences)
- Edson Zampronha (June 2, 1963), Brazilian composer (Music Composition and Conducting)

=== Faculty members ===
Notable faculty members of Unesp include:

- Sadhan Kumar Adhikari, Brazilian-Indian professor of physics
- Sérgio Burgani, Brazilian clarinetist
- Edwin O’Neill Willis (18 January 1935 – 11 April 2015), American ornithologist
- Mauro Galetti, Brazilian ecologist.

=== Miscellaneous ===
- Antonio Candido (July 24, 1918 – May 12, 2017), Brazilian writer, professor, sociologist and literary critic (professor-emeritus at Unesp)
- Pedro Carneiro, Portuguese solo classical percussionist, marimba player, composer, and conductor (former guest teacher at Unesp)
- Dennis Eberhard (1943–2005), American composer (former guest teacher at Unesp)
- Igor Lintz Maués (December 8, 1955), Brazilian composer and sound artist (guest lecturer at Unesp in 1980's)
- Marcelo Simões, Brazilian-American engineer (supervised an international power quality laboratory at Unesp)
- Mário Soares (7 December 1924 – 7 January 2017), Portuguese politician, former Prime Minister of Portugal and the 17th President of Portugal (Received a honoris causae by Unesp in 1987)

== See also ==
- Brazil University Rankings
- José Chiachiri Municipal Historical Museum
- List of state universities in Brazil
- Universities and Higher Education in Brazil
