= Edith Fanta =

Brazilian Antarctic researcher (1943–2008)

- Born: 1943
- Died: 7 May 2008 (aged 64–65)
- Education: University of Bristol; São Paulo State University
- Scientific career
- Fields: Marine Biology
- Workplaces: Federal University of Paraná State

Edith Susana Elisabeth Fanta was a Brazilian Antarctic marine biology researcher, best known for her work on preserving and protecting Antarctica. She was a professor at the Federal University of Paraná.

== Early life and education ==
Fanta was born in São Paulo, Brazil in 1943. She received her Masters (1970) and PhD (1972) degrees from the University of São Paulo in the field of Zoology.

Fanta undertook post-doctoral research at the Institute of Radiation and Environment in Munich, Germany (1974–76), and at the University of Bristol, UK.

== Career and impact ==
She then returned to Brazil to the Fisheries Institute at São Paulo State University, before taking on a professorship at the Federal University of Paraná State (UFPR) in the Center of Marine Studies in 1980. She later moved to the Department of Cell Biology at the UFPR.

She became an international leader in the Antarctic science through her research on the behaviour, physiology and morphology of Antarctic fish, publishing 58 peer-reviewed papers.

Fanta was part of the Brazilian Antarctic programme for 25 years, since its inception in 1983. She represented Brazil in many international Antarctic fora, including in the Scientific Committee on Antarctic Research (SCAR) Biology/ Life Sciences Standing Scientific Group and in the Commission for the Conservation of Antarctic Marine Living Resources (CCAMLR) since 1992.

For over ten years, she made valuable contributions from the early 1990s to the Antarctic Treaty System as member of the SCAR Group of Specialists on Environmental Affairs and Conservation. She also served as a member of the International Polar Year (IPY) Joint Committee and led a project as part of IPY (2007-2008).

Her dedication to science-based conservation and management of Antarctic marine resources led to her election as Chair of the Scientific Committee of the Commission for the Conservation of Antarctic Marine Living Resources (CCAMLR) where she served from 2005 until her death in 2008.
