= Sadhan Kumar Adhikari =

Indian academic

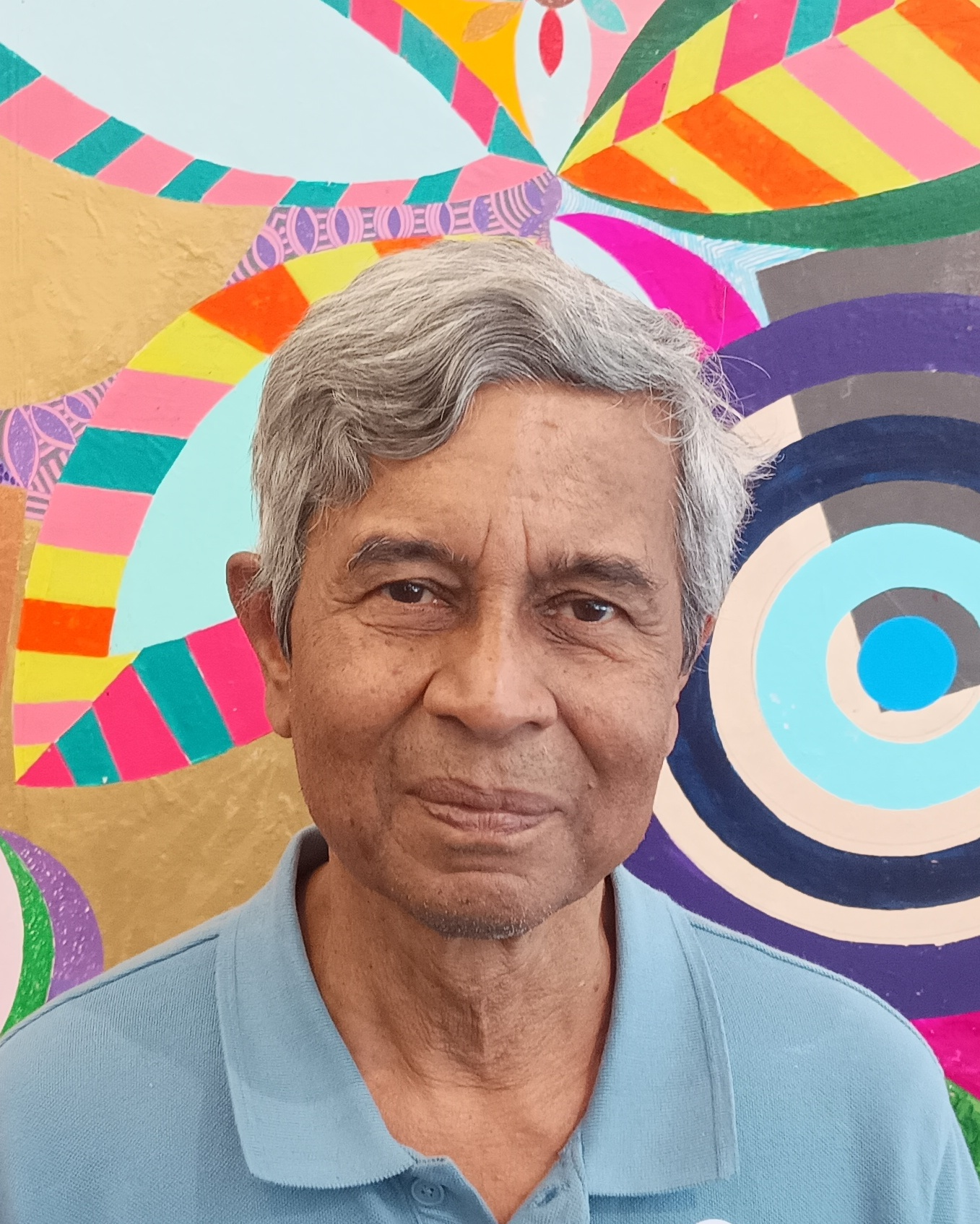
- photo taken in 2024
- Born: 2 January 1948 (age 78)
- Citizenship: Brazil
- Education: Hindu School, Kolkata; Presidency University; University of Calcutta; University of Pennsylvania
- Spouse: Ratnabali Adhikari
- Children: Avishek Adhikari (Associate Professor UCLA)
- Parent(s): Nalini Ranjan Adhikari; Mira Adhikari
- Scientific career
- Fields: Physics
- Workplaces: University of New South Wales; Federal University of Pernambuco; São Paulo State University

Sadhan Kumar Adhikari is a Brazilian-Indian professor of physics at the Institute of Theoretical Physics (IFT) of the São Paulo State University (UNESP) since 1991.

== Early life ==
Sadhan Kumar Adhikari was born to Nalini Ranjan and Mira Adhikari on 2 January 1948 in Kharagpore, India. In 1962 he graduated from Hindu School, Kolkata and then joined the Bachelor of Science program at the Presidency University, Kolkata which he finished with honours by 1965. The same year he started the Master of Science course at the University of Calcutta which he completed by 1968. For a year he was a post-M.Sc fellow at the Saha Institute of Nuclear Physics, India and in 1973 obtained PhD in physics from the University of Pennsylvania, USA. From 1973 to 1976 worked at the University of New South Wales, Australia as a post-doc scholar and since 1976 till 1991 was an associate professor at the Federal University of Pernambuco, Brazil.

== Research ==
He contributed to the area of few-body scattering in nuclear and atomic physics, renormalization in nonrelativistic quantum mechanics, and the physics of cold atoms and superfluids. He formulated the quantum scattering theory in two dimensions using Lippmann–Schwinger equations and the asymptotic wave function for scattering. From 2002 to 2009 he used Gross–Pitaevskii equation to study the formation of bright solitons in a Bose–Einstein condensate using FORTRAN 77 programs. He, in collaboration with P. Muruganandam and Antun Balaž, and colleagues from the Institute of Physics, Scientific Computing Laboratory, Belgrade wrote popular Fortran and C programs to solve the Gross–Pitaevskii equation and study properties of Bose–Einstein condensates using the Crank–Nicolson method. He is the author of two books on scattering theory published by Academic Press, San Francisco, Hard cover (1988), Paperback (2012) and eTextbook (2012) and by John Wiley & Sons, New York (1998). According to Webofscience he published more than 300 research articles with more than 7000 citations (H factor=44).

== Awards ==
Dr. Adhikari is a Graduate fellow of the University of Pennsylvania (1970), and a Fellow of the John Simon Guggenheim Memorial Foundation (1996).
