= Heleieth Saffioti =

Brazilian sociologist, teacher and feminist activist

- Born: Heleieth Iara Bongiovani Saffioti; January 4, 1934; Ibirá, São Paulo
- Died: December 13, 2010 (aged 76)
- Occupations: Author, sociologist, teacher
- Spouse: Waldemar Saffioti
- Writing career
- Language: Portuguese
- Subject: Feminism

Heleieth Iara Bongiovani Saffioti (Brazilian Portuguese pronunciation: [elej'ɛtʃi 'jarɑ]) (January 4, 1934 – December 13, 2010) was a Brazilian sociologist, teacher, and feminist activist.

== Life ==
Saffioti was the daughter of a seamstress and a mason. She was born in Ibirá in 1934 in the state of São Paulo. She graduated with a degree in Social Sciences from the Faculty of Philosophy, Sciences, and Letters of the University of São Paulo (USP) in 1960. In the same year, she began her first academic research on women's condition in Brazil, a theme that would be the object of her thesis for the Faculty of Philosophy, Sciences and Letters of Araraquara, the São Paulo State University (UNESP), entitled A mulher na sociedade de classe: mito e realidade (Woman in class society: myth and reality), under Professor Florestan Fernandes, which Saffioti defended in 1967 and was published in 1976. The book was a best-seller in its time and in the present day, it is still used as a reference in gender studies. Her Marxist perspective was the source of criticism because of the recent military coup in 1964, but she is referred as one of the most important theorists worldwide on the development of a "dialectical feminism".

She was a professor at the Pontifícia Universidade Católica de São Paulo (PUC-SP) and visiting professor at the School of Social Service Federal University of Rio de Janeiro (UFRJ). She created a Gender Studies Center, Class and Ethnicity at UFRJ, supervised theses at PUC-SP and retired from UNESP (Araraquara campus), of which he was professor emeritus. Although she had her academic positions, she did not affiliate with other organizations as she did not want to lose her "freedom of thought". In 2005, she was included in the collective statement "1000 Women for the Nobel Peace Prize", coordinated by the Swiss organization Women for Peace Around the World, which aimed at recognizing the role of women in peace efforts. Among the 1000 women were 51 Brazilians.

Saffioti was married to the physical chemist Waldemar Saffioti, professor, author of textbooks and councilor in Araraquara. In 2000, shortly after her husband's death, she decided to donate the couple's farm in Araraquara to UNESP, which was turned into a cultural center. She remained active until the end of her life. She died at the age of 76 due to arteriosclerosis.

== Selected works ==
- Women in Class Society. translated by Michael Vale. New York: Monthly Review Press, 1978 (original: A mulher na sociedade de classe: mito e realidade) (1969)
- Profissionalização feminina: professoras primárias e operárias (1969)
- Emprego doméstico e capitalismo (1978)
- Do artesanal ao industrial: a exploração da mulher (1981)
- O fardo das trabalhadoras rurais (1983)
- Mulher brasileira: opressão e exploração (1984)
- Poder do macho (1987)
- Mulher brasileira é assim (1994)
- Violência de gênero: poder e impotência (1995)
- Gênero, patriarcado e violência (2004)
