= Marcelo Simões =

Brazilian-American scientist engineer (born 1963)

Marcelo Godoy Simões
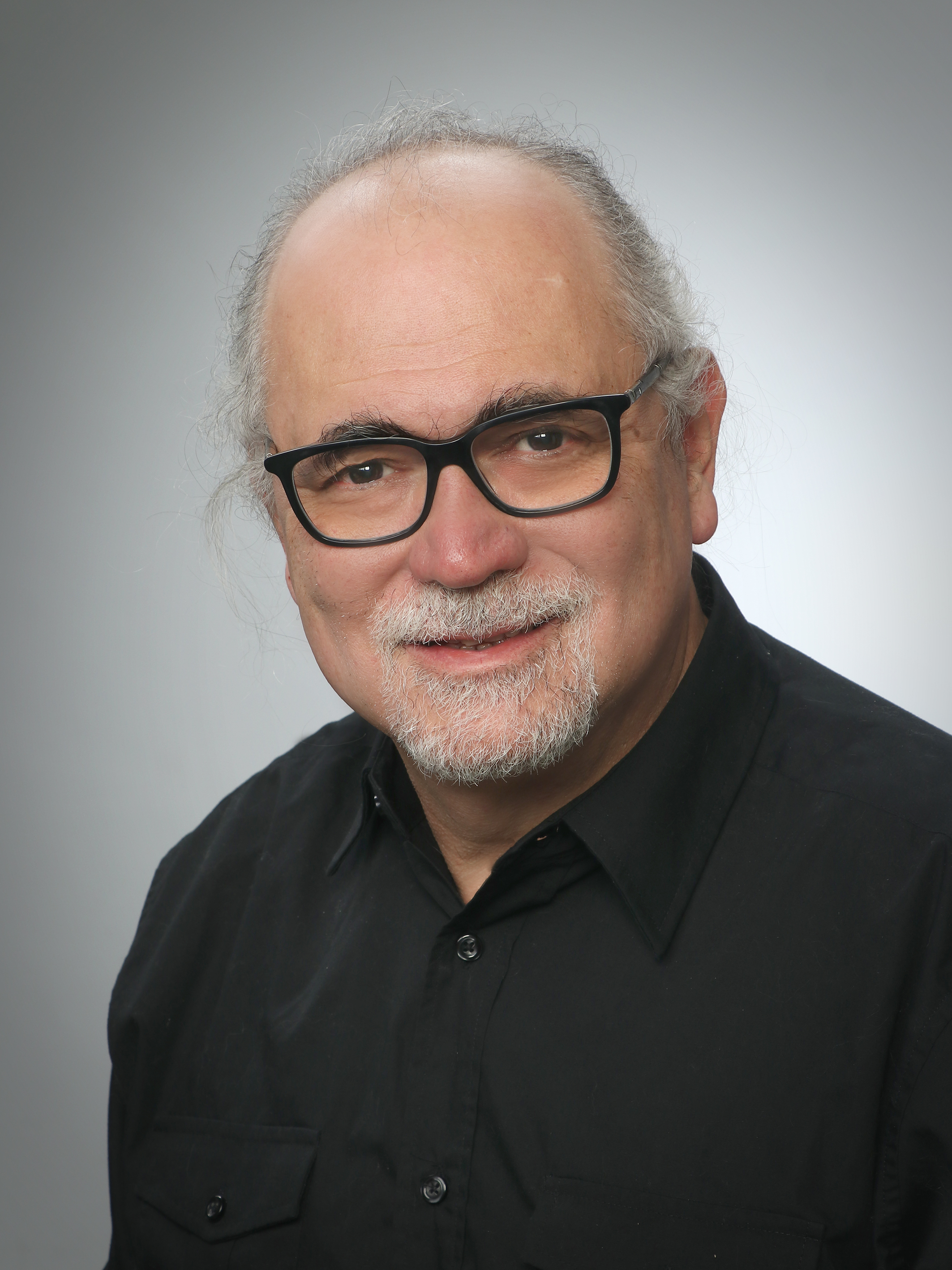
- Simoes in 2021
- Born: {1963} São Paulo, Brazil
- Known for: Pioneer in Power Electronics, Global promotion of Smartgrids and Renewable Energy Conversion, Recognized pioneer in HIL for validating advanced control systems for power electronics and smart grids, Global promotion of incorporation education and research towards advanced digital twin training for the high-tech, Python, Julia, Wolfram Language (Mathematica), PLC programming
- Awards: IEEE Fellow Member, Fulbright Fellowship
- Scientific career
- Fields: Power electronics, motor drives, electrical engineering, artificial intelligence, renewable energy systems
- Workplaces: University of Vaasa, Colorado School of Mines, University of Tennessee, University of São Paulo
- Doctoral advisor: Bimal K. Bose

Marcelo Godoy Simões is a Brazilian-American scientist engineer, Visiting Professor at Hope College in Holland, MI (2025–2026). Professor Emeritus (2021-2025) at the University of Vaasa. He was with Colorado School of Mines, in Golden, Colorado, for almost 21 years, where he is a Professor Emeritus. He transition to independent consulting through MGS Engineering, where he will provide technical representation for hardware-in-the-loop (HIL) software and digital twin training.He was elevated to Fellow of the Institute of Electrical and Electronics Engineers (IEEE) for applications of artificial intelligence in control of power electronics systems.

== Early life and career ==
Simões was born in São Paulo, Brazil in 1963, to José L.G. Simões and Cecília A.B.G. Simões, with a sister, Maysa A.G. Simões. When he was 11 years old, he had a strong motivation and decided to become an electrical engineer when his cousin, Hélio Adauto de Paula, showed him vacuum tube radios, transistorized audio amplifiers, and took Simões to visit his work as an electrical machine designer in Equacional, a motor manufacturing company in the city of São Paulo.

Simões was enrolled in an evening Catholic high school from 1978 to 1980, "Liceu Coração de Jesus", where he learned electronics as part of a technician degree. At that time, there was a job market for electronic technicians in Brazil, but he wanted to study further, and become an engineer. Therefore, in 1980, Simões took the entrance exams (FUVEST) for the University of São Paulo (USP) and was admitted as a student in "Escola Politécnica da Universidade de São Paulo (EPUSP)". He completed his B.Sc. degree in 1985. In 1982 he was admitted to the Electrical Engineering Department of EPUSP and started an internship at FDTE - Fundação para o Desenvolvimento Tecnológico da Engenharia. From 1984 to 1985, he focused his expertise in telecommunications, antennas, high frequency, analog, and digital circuits design. His Senior Design in 1985 was a modem with analog and digital circuits implemented for interfacing an 8085 microprocessor, operating on a regular telephone connection. Such a system was made before the age of computers connected on telephone lines via modems. During his four years internship for FDTE, he was learning with senior engineers how to design DC-DC converters and off-line switching mode power supplies, using Phillips manuals for TV flyback circuits and National Instruments handbooks. Those power converters were built and implemented in railroad automation (FEPASA), as well as in the São Paulo Metro subway system. In 1985 Simões graduated from EPUSP and worked as an engineer for a few years with FDTE. He was inspired by several faculty from EPUSP, for example, Prof. Luiz de Queiroz Orsini who taught him modern computer-based electrical and electronics circuits analysis (that time with mainframes, and later on MAC's and PC's), José Roberto Cardoso who taught electrical machines and energy conversion. Simões also learned a lot from Prof. Edson Benedicto Ramos Féris and Prof. Guido Stolfi techniques for analog high-frequency circuit designer. During the Senior year (1985) Simões attended a course from Prof. Waldir Pó on introduction to Power Electronics, where the principles of utilizing thyristors, diodes, and transistors, to control electrical circuits for energy conversion was a transformation in how Simões wanted to further his career, giving him a strong motivation to learn and understand power electronics for controlling machines, ac-dc, dc-ac, and dc-dc power conversion.

From 1986 to 1989, Simões worked for FDTE, at the same time leading technical research with three other partners who together started a company, Antares Eletrônica. Simões completed his M.Sc. degree under the advice of professor Moacyr Martucci Jr. During his master's degree, Simões started to heavily use computer-based design, initially with MicroCap for PC's, applying Pascal and C languages with compilers made for PC's, then also adopting Matlab in 1988 when it became available for the IBM PC 286 with a co-processor 287. Simões studied most of papers in modeling and simulation of dc/dc converters, based on R. D. Middlebrook and Slobodan Ćuk work. Simões joined EPUSP in 1989 as an instructor in the newly formed Mechatronics group inside the Department of Mechanical Engineering, and finished his master's degree in 1990. After meeting Prof. Ivo Barbi in 1989, during an event organized at the Universidade Federal de Santa Catarina, the II SEP–Seminário de Eletrônica de Potência, Prof. Barbi motivated Simões to study Prof. Bimal Kumar Bose's papers. Simões then realized that power electronics was a bigger picture. Simões invited Prof. B.K. Bose to come to Brazil in 1990 to give a 3-day mini-course, and about 40 people attended this mini-course, from local schools in São Paulo, senior engineers from industry, several faculty members from other schools and other states, the meeting was a success, and Simões became very enthusiastic about joining the research group of Prof. Bose.

In August 1991, Simões was admitted as a Ph.D. student at the University of Tennessee Knoxville, supported by a Brazilian scholarship from CNPq (Conselho Nacional de Desenvolvimento e Pesquisa), with a leave of absence from EPUSP. He was a graduate student in the Electrical Engineering Department of UTK, working under the advice of Prof. Bimal K. Bose, from 1991 to 1995. Simões conducted research at the facilities of EPRI/PEAC (Power Electronics Applications Center) where Prof. Bimal K. Bose had his research program. Simões studied all graduate courses available in the UTK graduate program in power electronics, power systems, control systems, and artificial intelligence, mainly learning fuzzy logic and neural networks, in order to apply into his Ph.D. dissertation. After obtaining his Ph.D. in 1995, Simões returned to Brazil to teach at the Mechatronics Department of University of São Paulo. Simões was promoted from Assistant to Associate Professor, after he obtained his Livre-Docência Diploma in 1998 (similar to a Doctor of Science degree). Simões decided to immigrate and continue his career in the USA. He moved to Lakewood, Colorado, in order to accept a faculty position with the Colorado School of Mines in April 2000.

== Academic life and career ==
Simões received a B.Sc. degree from University of São Paulo, Brazil, an M.Sc. degree from University of São Paulo, Brazil, and a Ph.D. degree from The University of Tennessee, US in 1985, 1990 and 1995 respectively. He received his D.Sc. degree (Livre-Docência) from the University of São Paulo in 1998. Dr. Simões was a Fulbright Fellow for AY 2014–2015, in the Aalborg University, Institute of Energy Technology (Denmark). He joined Colorado School of Mines in 2000; during his tenure at Mines he applied several intelligent based control for advancing high power electronics applications for distributed energy systems and smart-grid technology. He was a recipient of the NSF - Faculty Early Career Development (CAREER) Award in 2002, one of the most prestigious award for new faculty members supporting activities of young teacher-scholars. He served as the director of the Center for Advanced Control of Energy and Power Systems – ACEPS, and the Colorado Electric Power Research Consortium – CEPRC at the Colorado School of Mines. Dr. Simões was teaching and conducting research of fuzzy logic, neural networks, bayesian networks, and in multi-agent systems for power electronics, drives and machines control, building an academic framework for advancing the integration of users with the distribution grid in applications defined as "smart-grid technology."

Dr. Simões work has been internationally recognized, with highly cited papers and books. He has been conducting cooperation with several institutions in several countries, serving as advisor for students and research programs. He worked as a visiting professor with UTBM – University of Technology of Belfort-Montbéliard, and ENS - l'École Normale Supérieure de Cachan, in France, supervised an international power quality laboratory in Brazil at São Paulo State University – UNESP, served as technical advisor for Universidad APEC in the República Dominicana. He published several books in English, in application of induction generators for renewable energy systems (CRC Press), integration of alternative sources of energy (Wiley/IEEE), modeling power electronics and energy systems (IEEE/Wiley), instrumentation for smart-grid (CRC Press), power electronics for integration of renewable energy systems with Springer-Verlag, published the only book available in Portuguese language about fuzzy logic modeling and control, and published "Artificial Intelligence for Smarter Power Systems" with IET(UK) in 2021.

Dr. Simões was IEEE senior member from 1998 to 2016, and he became IEEE Fellow in 2016. He has served IEEE in various capacities. He was IEEE PELS Educational Chairman, IEEE PELS Intersociety Liaison and Associate-Editor for Energy Conversion, as well as Editor for Intelligent Systems of IEEE Transactions on Aerospace and Electronic Systems, and Associate-Editor for Power Electronics in Drives of IEEE Transactions on Power Electronics. He was Transactions Paper Review Chair for IAS/IACC and vice-chair of IEEE IAS/MSDAD. Dr. Simões organized several conferences and technical sessions for IEEE, he was the Program Chair for IEEE PESC 2005, in the Steering and Organization Committee of the IEEE International Future Energy Challenge, the organizer of the 1st PEEW’05 - Power Electronics Education Workshop. He organized the IEEE GreenTech 2017 in Denver, Colorado. Dr. Simões coordinated PELS Chapter activities in Denver, he is the founder of IEEE Denver Chapter of the Power Electronics Society as well as the founder of the IEEE IES Denver Chapter, and served as Chapter Chair. He was the chair for the IEEE IES Smart-Grid Committee. He is IEEE IES AdCom Member-at-Large for a three-year term Jan//2019 to Dec//2021, a member of IES Awards & Honors Committee from 2019 to 2021, served as co-EiC for the IEEE Transactions on IES, organized the IEEE GreenTech 2021 and served as Technical Program Chair of IECON 2021.

== Educational Philosophy and Innovation ==
- Throughout his later career, Simões has championed an educational philosophy centered on "Essential Skills for Engineers to Thrive in the AI Era," which advocates for a "whole student" approach that integrates technical mastery with emotional and ethical development. As documented in his Lattes CV and university profiles, this pedagogy emphasizes a transition from legacy offline simulations to high-fidelity, real-time hardware-in-the-loop (HIL) emulation and digital twin training, which he presents as essential roadmaps for designing modern cyber-physical grids. His instructional methods, highlighted in updates from the University of Vaasa and on LinkedIn, focus on project-based learning (PBL) and the early integration of "smarter" technologies—such as fuzzy logic, neural networks, and deep learning—into the core electrical engineering curriculum. Furthermore, in his role as "The Elektron Whisperer" for IEEE Electrification Magazine, Simões employs storytelling to humanize engineering history, aiming to motivate a new generation of engineers to view the profession as a calling dedicated to societal sustainability and the data-driven demands of the 21st century.
- Project-Based Learning: Throughout his career, Professor Simões has been dedicated to reimagining traditional pedagogy through Project-Based Learning. At the Colorado School of Mines, he revamped the electrical engineering and computational modeling courses to shift from abstract theory to hands-on, application-driven instruction. A cornerstone of this work was the "PI-Calc@Mines" initiative, where a Raspberry Pi and real-time computing motivated the teaching of electrical circuits and mathematical modeling. Such an approach bridged the gap between complex mathematical concepts and real-world engineering, making high-level modeling tangible for students and significantly improving both engagement and retention.
- "Whole Student" Approach: His instructional philosophy has been centered on a "Whole Student" approach, which mirrors the belief that education must prepare individuals for a free and fulfilling life by looking beyond mere technical proficiency. Therefore all the course planning, units, lectures and assessments have been done to integrate rigorous technical excellence with a student’s emotional and ethical development by blending academic depth with intentional mentorship. The pedagogy aims the maturity of students towards nurturing the academic, emotional, and social facets of every learner, ensuring they are equipped to lead with both skill and character.
- Humanitarian Engineering: For many decades, Professor Simões has been committed to social responsibility. He was PI and CO-PI in several National Science Foundation (NSF) project on advanced technology as well as Humanitarian Engineering ethics and learning. He worked with other peers to develop specialized curricula that challenged students to examine the social and ethical responsibilities of engineers in a global context. By integrating these humanitarian perspectives into the technical curriculum, students became able to understand how their professional contributions can be leveraged for the betterment of communities and society at large.

== Work ==
IEEE Columnist:Marcelo Simoes write under the moniker "The Elektron Whisperer," using storytelling to explain complex technical topics. Simões is the author of twelve books in power electronics, renewable energy, artificial intelligence, microgrids and smartgrids.

1. M. Godoy Simões and T.D.C. Busarello, Power Electronic Converters and Systems 2nd Ed. Vol. 2: Applications, The Institution of Engineering and Technology, Michael Faraday House, Six Hills Way, Stevenage, Hertfordshire, SG1 2AY, UKISBN 978-1-83953-770-7
2. M. Godoy Simões and T.D.C. Busarello, Power Electronic Converters and Systems 2nd Ed. Vol. 1: Converters and Machine Drives, The Institution of Engineering and Technology, Michael Faraday House, Six Hills Way, Stevenage, Hertfordshire, SG1 2AY, UKISBN 978-1-83953-768-4
3. M. Godoy Simões, Artificial Intelligence for Smarter Power Systems: Fuzzy Logic and Neural Networks, The Institution of Engineering and Technology, Michael Faraday House, Six Hills Way, Stevenage, Hertfordshire, SG1 2AY, UKISBN 978-1-83953-001-2
4. M. Godoy Simões, Artificial Intelligence for Smarter Power Systems - fuzzy logic and neural networks, IET. ISBN 978-1-83953-000-5
5. M. Godoy Simões and H.K.M. Paredes, Applied Neural Networks and Fuzzy Logic in Power Electronics, Motor Drives, Renewable Energy Systems and Smart Grids, MDPI https://doi.org/10.3390/books978-3-03943-335-3; open Access by the authors; ISBN 978-3-03943-334-6 (Hbk); ISBN 978-3-03943-335-3 (PDF)
6. F. A. Farret, M. Godoy Simões, D. I. Brandão, Electronic Instrumentation for Distributed Generation and Power Processes, CRC Press. ISBN 978-1-4987-8241-8
7. F.A. Farret, M. Godoy Simões, Integration of Renewable Sources of Energy, 2nd Edition, John Wiley and Sons. ISBN 978-1-119-13736-8
8. M. Godoy Simões, F. A. Farret; Modeling Power Electronics and Interfacing Energy Conversion Systems, IEEE/Wiley. ISBN 978-1-119-05826-7
9. M.G. Simões, F. A. Farret, Modeling and Analysis with Induction Generators – 3rd Edition, Taylor and Francis / CRC Press, December 2014. ISBN 978-1-4822-4467-0
10. Sudipta Chakraborty, M. Godoy Simões and William Kramer, Power Electronics for Renewable and Distributed Energy Systems: A Sourcebook of Topologies, Control and Integration, Springer-Verlag . ISBN 1447151038, ISBN 978-1447151036
11. M. Godoy Simões, F. A. Farret, Alternative Energy Systems: Design and Analysis with Induction Generators – 2nd Edition, CRC Press, ISBN 1-4200-5532-1.
12. F.A. Farret, M. Godoy Simões, Integration of Alternative Sources of Energy, John Wiley and Sons. ISBN 0-471-71232-9.
13. M. Godoy Simões, F. A. Farret, Renewable Energy Systems: Design and Analysis with Induction Generators, CRC Press. ISBN 0-8493-2031-3.
14. M. Godoy Simões, F. A. Farret, Solutions Manual - Renewable Energy Systems (companion to textbook), CRC Press. ISBN 0849333598.
15. M. Godoy Simões and I.S. Shaw, Controle e Modelagem Fuzzy (First book in Portuguese about fuzzy control systems) [Fuzzy Modeling and Control] Publisher: Edgard Blucher. ISBN 8-52-12024-82, 1st Edition: 1999, 2nd Edition: 2007.

== Selected Publications ==
Here is a list of some selected publications, for a full list please refer to:

- Y.S. Perdana, S.M. Muyeen, A. Al-Durra, H.K. Morales-Paredes, and M. Godoy Simões, "Direct Connection of Supercapacitor-Battery Hybrid Storage System to the Grid-tied Photovoltaic System," IEEE Transactions on Sustainable Energy, 2018.
- F. Harirchi, M. Godoy Simões, "Enhanced Instantaneous Power Theory Decomposition for Power Quality Smart Converter Applications," IEEE Transactions on Power Electronics, vol. 33, no. 11, pp. 9344–9359, Nov. 2018.
- A. Mortezaei, M.Godoy Simoes, M. Savaghebi, J.M. Guerrero, and A. Al-Durra, "Cooperative control of multi-master-slave islanded microgrid with power quality enhancement based on conservative power theory" IEEE Transactions on Smart Grid, vol. PP, no.99, pp. 1–1. 2017.
- D.I. Brandão, T. Caldognetto, F.P. Marafão, M. Godoy Simões, J.A. Pomílio, P. Tenti "Centralized control of distributed single-phase inverters arbitrarily connected to three-phase four-wire microgrids" IEEE Transactions on Smart Grid, 437–446, 2017.
- M. Babakmehr, M. G. Simões, M. B. Wakin, A. A. Durra and F. Harirchi "Smart-grid topology identification using sparse recovery" in IEEE Transactions on Industry Applications, vol. 52, no. 5, pp. 4375–4384, Sept.-Oct. 2016.
- M. Godoy Simões, T.D.C. Busarello, A.S. Bubshait, F. Harirchi, J.A. Pomilio and F. Blaabjerg "Interactive Smart Battery Storage for a PV and Wind Hybrid Energy Management Control Based on Conservative Power Theory" International Journal of Control, Taylor & Francis, https://doi.org/10.1080/00207179.2015.1102971, 2015.
- M. Godoy Simões, F.A. Farret, F. Blaabjerg "Small wind energy systems" Electric Power Components and Systems, Special Issue: Renewable Energy Devices and Systems-State-of-the-Art and Future Trends, vol. 43, issue 12, pp. 1388–1405, 2015.
- M. Godoy Simões, E. Muljadi, M. Singh and V. Gevorgian "Measurement-based performance analysis of wind energy systems" IEEE Instrumentation and Measurement Magazine, vol. 17, no.2, pp. 15–20, April 2014.
- K. McBee, M. Godoy Simões "Evaluating the long-term impact of a continuously increasing harmonic demand on feeder level voltage distortion" IEEE Trans. on Industry Appl. vol.50, no.3, pp. 2142–2149, May–June 2014.
- A. Reznik, M. G. Simões, A. Al-Durra and S. M. Muyeen, "LCL Filter Design and Performance Analysis for Grid-Interconnected Systems," in IEEE Transactions on Industry Applications, vol. 50, no. 2, pp. 1225–1232, March–April 2014.
- X. Yu, C. Cecati, T. Dillon and M. G. Simões, "The New Frontier of Smart Grids," in IEEE Industrial Electronics Magazine, vol. 5, no. 3, pp. 49–63, Sept. 2011.
- B. Kroposki, C. Pink, R. DeBlasio, H. Thomas, M. Simões and P. K. Sen, "Benefits of Power Electronic Interfaces for Distributed Energy Systems," in IEEE Transactions on Energy Conversion, vol. 25, no. 3, pp. 901–908, Sept. 2010.
- J. Lagorse, M. G. Simoes and A. Miraoui, "A Multiagent Fuzzy-Logic-Based Energy Management of Hybrid Systems," in IEEE Transactions on Industry Applications, vol. 45, no. 6, pp. 2123–2129, Nov.-dec. 2009.
- J. L. Duarte, M. Hendrix and M. G. Simoes, "Three-Port Bidirectional Converter for Hybrid Fuel Cell Systems," in IEEE Transactions on Power Electronics, vol. 22, no. 2, pp. 480–487, March 2007.
- S. Chakraborty, M. D. Weiss and M. G. Simoes, "Distributed Intelligent Energy Management System for a Single-Phase High-Frequency AC Microgrid," in IEEE Transactions on Industrial Electronics, vol. 54, no. 1, pp. 97–109, Feb. 2007.
- J. M. Correa, F. A. Farret, V. A. Popov and M. G. Simoes, "Sensitivity analysis of the modeling parameters used in Simulation of proton exchange membrane fuel cells," in IEEE Transactions on Energy Conversion, vol. 20, no. 1, pp. 211–218, March 2005.
- J. M. Correa, F. A. Farret, L. N. Canha and M. G. Simoes, "An electrochemical-based fuel-cell model suitable for electrical engineering automation approach," in IEEE Transactions on Industrial Electronics, vol. 51, no. 5, pp. 1103–1112, Oct. 2004.
- M. R. G. Meireles, P. E. M. Almeida and M. G. Simoes, "A comprehensive review for industrial applicability of artificial neural networks," in IEEE Transactions on Industrial Electronics, vol. 50, no. 3, pp. 585–601, June 2003.
- M. Godoy Simões, Bimal K. Bose, Ronald J. Spiegel "Fuzzy logic based intelligent control of a variable speed cage machine wind generation system," IEEE Transactions on Power Electronics, vol. 12, pp. 87–95, Jan. 1997.
- M. G. Simoes, B. K. Bose and R. J. Spiegel, "Design and performance evaluation of a fuzzy-logic-based variable-speed wind generation system," in IEEE Transactions on Industry Applications, vol. 33, no. 4, pp. 956–965, July-Aug. 1997.

== Awards and Honors ==
Awards received by Dr. Simões include, among many others:

- FA Farret, MG Simoes, "Integration of alternative sources of energy"John Wiley & Sons 2006.
- A Reznik, MG Simões, A Al-Durra, SM Muyeen, "LCL filter design and performance analysis for grid-interconnected systems",IEEE transactions on industry applications 50 (2), 1225-1232 2013.
- JM Corrêa, FA Farret, LN Canha, MG Simoes, "An electrochemical-based fuel-cell model suitable for electrical engineering automation approach", IEEE Transactions on industrial electronics 51 (5), 1103-1112 2004.
- MG Simões, IS Shaw, "Controle e modelagem fuzzy", Editora Blucher.
- MG Simoes, BK Bose, RJ Spiegel, "Fuzzy logic based intelligent control of a variable speed cage machine wind generation system", IEEE transactions on power electronics 12 (1), 87-95 1997
- MRG Meireles, PEM Almeida, MG Simões, "A comprehensive review for industrial applicability of artificial neural networks", IEEE transactions on industrial electronics 50 (3), 585-601 2003
- S Chakraborty, MD Weiss, MG Simoes, "Distributed intelligent energy management system for a single-phase high-frequency AC microgrid", IEEE Transactions on Industrial electronics 54 (1), 97-109 2007
- JL Duarte, M Hendrix, MG Simões, "Three-port bidirectional converter for hybrid fuel cell systems", IEEE Transactions on Power Electronics 22 (2), 480-487 2007
- Y Xinghuo, C Cecati, T Dillon, MG Simões, "The new frontier of smart grids", IEEE Industrial Electronics 5 (3), 49-63 2011
- MG Simoes, FA Farret, "Renewable energy systems: design and analysis with induction generators", CRC press 2004
- B Kroposki, C Pink, R DeBlasio, H Thomas, M Simoes, PK Sen, "Benefits of power electronic interfaces for distributed energy systems"IEEE transactions on energy conversion 25 (3), 901-908 2010
- MG Simoes, BK Bose, RJ Spiegel, "Design and performance evaluation of a fuzzy-logic-based variable-speed wind generation system" IEEE Transactions on Industry Applications 33 (4), 956-965 1997
- P Zhao, S Suryanarayanan, MG Simoes, "An energy management system for building structures using a multi-agent decision-making control methodology", IEEE transactions on industry applications 49 (1), 322-330 2012
- MG Simoes, BK Bose, "Neural network based estimation of feedback signals for a vector controlled induction motor drive", IEEE Transactions on Industry Applications 31 (3), 620-629 1995
- JM Correa, FA Farret, VA Popov, MG Simoes, "Sensitivity analysis of the modeling parameters used in simulation of proton exchange membrane fuel cells", IEEE Transactions on energy conversion 20 (1), 211-218 2005
- Best Paper Award in the IEEE 4th Global Power Energy and Communication Conference, IEEE GPECOM2022 in Cappadocia, Turkey, held on June 14-17 2022, for the paper "Comprehensive Design Approach for Field-Oriented Control of Interior Permanent Magnet Synchronous Machines"
- 2021 IEEE R5/Denver Section Service Award.
- In 2019, Simões served as the Electrical Engineering Coordinator for an international student team in the Solar Decathlon Africa competition, where his team was awarded 1st Prize for the design and construction of a net-zero solar-powered house. His pioneering research in hardware-in-the-loop (HIL) has also received international recognition, including awards for advanced research utilizing Typhoon HIL solutions for smart grid applications. More recently, he received the Best Paper Award at the 2022 IEEE 4th Global Power Energy and Communication Conference (GPECOM) for his work on field-oriented control of permanent magnet synchronous machines. These honors complement his earlier prestigious recognitions, such as the NSF CAREER Award (2002) and his elevation to IEEE Fellow (2016).
- 2018 Premium Award Best Paper in IET Renewable Power Generation.
- Professor Simões has recently received prestigious international recognition for his pioneering collaborative research in real-time simulation technology, specifically through the application of hardware-in-the-loop (HIL) solutions. A highlight of this success is the Best Paper Award received at the 2022 IEEE 4th Global Power Energy and Communication Conference (GPECOM) in Cappadocia, Turkey. This award-winning research, which involved key collaborators such as Tiago Busarello and Qudrat Ullah, presented a comprehensive design approach for the field-oriented control of interior permanent magnet synchronous machines. As documented in his professional records, the study utilized a Typhoon HIL 402 unit to simulate the entire physics of the inverter and motor, which then communicated with external microcontrollers to validate high-performance control algorithms under realistic conditions. These achievements are part of a broader series of international awards for advanced research that Simões has gained for his work with Typhoon HIL, a partnership that has also facilitated the integration of state-of-the-art HIL rigs into the University of Vaasa’s FREESI Laboratory to train the next generation of smart energy researchers
- 2018 EE Department, Colorado School of Mines, Services Award.
- IEEE Fellow (2016), with citation "for applications of artificial intelligence in control of power electronics systems."
- Fulbright Fellow (2014–15), Visiting Scholar with Aalborg University (Denmark).
- NSF - Faculty Early Career Development CAREER (2002), it the NSF's most prestigious award for new faculty members, recognizing activities of teacher-scholars who are considered most likely to become the academic leaders of the 21st century.
- IEEE Industry Applications Society IACC Service Award 2013.
- Best Paper of the Year 2011 Award, given by IEEE Industrial Electronics Society, for the paper "The New Frontier of Smart Grids" IEEE Industrial Electronics Magazine, November/December 2011, pp. 49–63, vo. 5, no. 3, authored by X. Y. Yu, C. Cecati, T. Dillon and M. Godoy Simões.
- Best Conference Paper Award, given by IEEE Industrial Automation and Control Committee of the Industry Applications Society, for the paper "An Energy Management System for Building Structures Using a Multi-Agent Decision-Making Control Methodology," authored by Peng Zhao, Siddharth Suryanarayanan, and M. Godoy Simões, IEEE IAS Annual Meeting 2010.
- IEEE Electrical Power & Energy Conference (EPEC), 2009, Montreal, Best Conference Paper Award for the paper "PEM fuel cell stack hardware-in-the-loop emulation using DC/DC converter design."
- CSM Research Fair (1st) for the thesis defended by Caroline Uriarte, "Electrical Modeling and Integration of Distributed Energy Resources into the Electric Grid," April 2007.
- Nominated for a Canada Research Chair faculty position at University of Concordia, May 2006.
- IEEE Power Electronics Society recognition award for furthering the objectives of the society by serving as 2005 PESC Technical Program Chair and PEEW Chair.
- North American Power Symposium, 1st Prize Graduate Student Award, for the paper with Robert Wood derived from his M.Sc. thesis entitled "Experimental evaluation of a stand alone wind turbine induction generator under stator flux orientation," August 2004.
- Award for Leadership and Services, from the IEEE Industrial Automation and Controls Committee of the Industry Applications Society, October 2003.
- Dr. Simões was advisor for the 2003 Future Energy Challenge CSM undergraduate team. The CSM students were awarded an IEEE PK Sen Senior Design Award by the IEEE – IAS/PES Denver Chapter in October 2002.
- Certificate of Appreciation from U.S. Department of Energy for working on the organizing committee of the 2001 Future Energy Challenge.
- IEEE IECON 2001 Best Paper Presentation Award "Resonant ac link system converter for fuel cell grid interface".
- IEEE 1998 Industry Applications Society Best Paper Prize, for the technical competence displayed in the paper entitled "A novel competitive learning neural network based acoustic transmission system for oil-well monitoring" October 1998.
