= Néle Azevedo =

Brazilian artist

- Born: 1950 (age 74–75); Santos Dumont, MG, Brazil
- Education: Art Institute of State University of São Paulo, Brazil (MA, Visual art); Faculdade Santa Marcelina (BA, Art); Faculdade de Educação e Ciências Pinheirense (BA)
- Known for: Sculpture

Néle Azevedo (born 1950) is a Brazilian sculptor, visual artist and independent researcher. She is best known for her "Melting Men" installations.

== Early life and education ==
Azevedo was born in Santos Dumont, a municipality in the south-eastern Minas Gerais state of Brazil, in 1950.

She graduated with a Bachelor in Fine Arts from Santa Marcelina College in 1997 and obtained a master's degree in Visual Arts from São Paulo State University's (UNESP) Arts Institute in 2003.

== Work ==
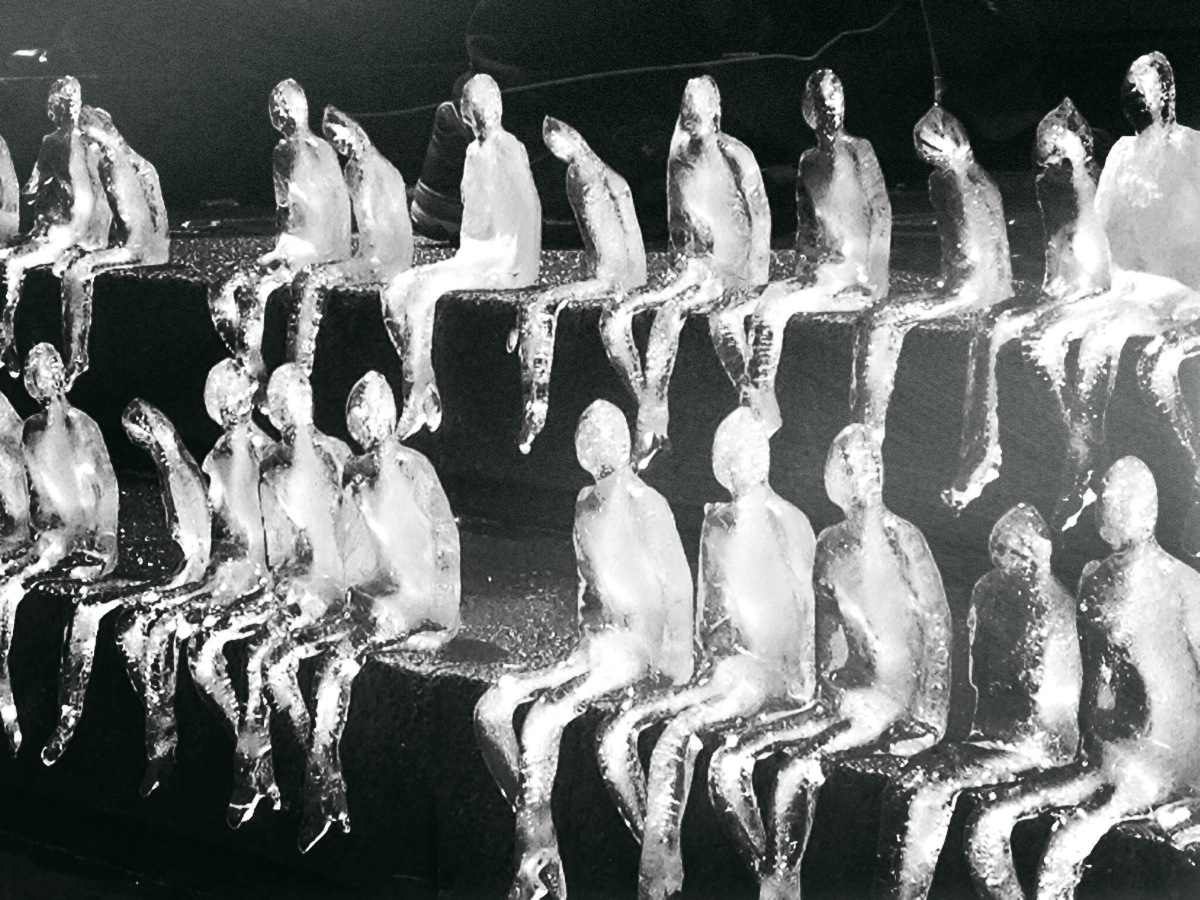
Minimum Monument installation in Chamberlain Square, Birmingham, UK (2014)

In 1998, Azevedo launched a solo exhibition with an installation of iron sculptures at the Brazilian Post Cultural Center in Rio de Janeiro and won the acquisition prize in the Santo André Art Hall in São Paulo.

In 2001, Azevedo started working on the Minimum Monument Project doing interventions in urban space that discuss contemporary public monuments in countries such as Brazil, Cuba, Japan, France, Germany, Portugal, and Italy. These temporary art interventions have become known worldwide as the "Army of Melting Men" or simply "Melting Men".

For the Melting Men installations Azevedo places hundreds, sometimes thousands, of hand-cut ice figures in public places. The whole installation usually melts within the next 30 minutes, depending on local conditions, and draws a crowd to watch the unfolding events. Her installations sometimes also incorporate additional elements like photography or paint.

The "Melting Men" have featured topics like World War I or Climate change.

The Minimum Monument project, along with the other urban interventions developed by Azevedo including "Glory to Inglorious Fights" and "Anhangabau: A River For The Absent Ones", have their genesis in local history. The interventions have resulted in videos, pictures and drawings and gained attention in different local, national and international media.

== Urban interventions ==
2010
Torgtrappene, Stavanger, Norway, 15 September
2009
Gendarmenmarkt, Berlin, Germany, 2 September. This sculpture is called Melting Men. It represents that global warming is fast approaching and that it affects everyone.
2008
Piazza della Santissima Annunziata, Florence, Italy, 21 October
2007
Ribeirão Preto City, 22 September
Virada Cultural São Paulo, Glória a todas as lutas inglórias, (Glory to all the inglorious fights), Intervention at Pateo do Colégio-São Paulo, 5 May
2006
Burgplatz, Braunschweig, Germany, 16 June
Praça D. João I, Porto City, PT, 22 September
2005
Municipal Theatre, São Paulo, São Paulo, Brazil, 19 November
Place L’Opera end Mairie du 9émè, Paris, France, 30 June
Praça da Sé, São Paulo, São Paulo, Brazil, 7 April
2004
Largo da Ordem, Curitiba, Parana, Brazil, 10–13 April
2003
Salvador, Bahia, Brazil
Tokyo and Kyoto, Japan, sponsored by the Brazilian Embassy in Tokyo, Japan Brasília, Federal District, Brazil
2002
Havana, Cuba
São Paulo, São Paulo, Brazil

== Awards ==
- 2007: Winner of the Award for Experimental Video at the 15th Video festival, Teresina, Piaui, Brazil, December
- 2002: Awarded the Bunkyo Art Hall 1st prize with an installation of sculptures in acrylic
- 2002: 31st Salão Bunkyo // 31st. Bunkyo Contemporary Art Show: Golden Medal and JAL Award
- 1998: XXVI Contemporary Art Show, Acquisition Award. Santo André City, São Paulo, Brazil 1996: X Atibiai Art Meeting: Special Mention

== Public collections ==
- MartiusStaden Institut, São Paulo, Brazil
- Bienal International, Evento of Art of Vila Nova de Cerveira, Portugal
- Pinacoteca Municipal, São Paulo, Brazil
- Sycomore Art Gallery, Paris, France
- ACBEU Gallery, Salvador, Bahia, Brazil
- Nipo Brasileiro Art Museum, São Paulo, Brazil
- Wifredo Lam Contemporary Art Center, Havana, Cuba
- Cultural Center of Mail Department, Rio de Janeiro, Brazil
- Espirito Santo Art Museum, Vitória, Brazil
- Santo Andre Art Museum, Santo André, São Paulo, Brazil
- Atibibaia Museum, Atibaia, São Paulo, Brazil
