= Adão Iturrusgarai =

Brazilian cartoonist and comics artist

- Born: February 18, 1965 (age 61) Cachoeira do Sul, Brazil
- Areas: Cartoonist, writer, comics artist
- Notable works: Aline, Rocky & Hudson
- Awards: Troféu HQ Mix (Tira); Prêmio Angelo Agostini for Master of National Comics
- Spouse: Laura Iturrusgarai
- Children: 2

Adão Iturrusgarai (born February 18, 1965) is a Brazilian cartoonist and comics artist.

== Biography ==
Born in Cachoeira do Sul into a family of Basque origin, Iturrusgarai published his first drawing when seventeen years old, at Jornal do Povo, his hometown newspaper. At eighteen, he moved to Porto Alegre, where he studied Marketing and Advertising at the Pontifical Catholic University of Rio Grande do Sul ( PUCRS ). He also completed a course in Fine Arts, but he didn't conclude it.

In 1991, Iturrusgarai edited the magazine Dundum and soon after traveled to Paris. In France, he published in the magazines 'Chacal Puant' and ' Flag'. In 1993 he returned to Brazil, living in São Paulo. In 1994, he published the magazine "Big Bang Bang", which lasted only for four numbers. He was a writer for several television comedy shows, including TV Colosso and Casseta & Planeta, at TV Globo. In 1994 he joined the collaborative comic strip "Los 3 Amigos" together with the cartoonists Angeli, Glauco and Laerte. Iturrusgarai had his work published in several Brazilian magazines such as Chiclete com Banana, Bundas, Veja, General and Virus.

He currently publishes a daily strip at Folha de S.Paulo. He also collaborated with the magazines Caros Amigos and Capricho. He has received several awards, and his comics albums are published by Devir and distributed in Brazil and Portugal. Iturrusgarai currently lives in Argentina with his wife Laura and two children. In 2025, Iturrusgarai took part in the collective exhibition "¡Gaza en la mira! Artistas contra el genocidio" ("Gaza in the Crosshairs! Artists Against Genocide"), presented on October 4, 2025,curated by Sergio Langer.

== Characters ==
- Aline – Created in 1993 and first published in 1996; Aline lives a three-way relationship with two men: Otto and Pedro. In the comics, Aline remained in her twenties until the last publication in 2009.

In 2014, to commemorate the twentieth anniversary of the strip, Adão retook Aline's character at age forty, now with age-related problems and a daughter, Luna, but "with more polyamory than ever".

In 2005, five Aline cartoons were produced, broadcast on the Brazilian version of the Cartoon Network channel on the Adult Swim block. In the animated version, Aline has the voice of Fernanda Fernandes, and Felipe Grinnan and Manolo Rey voiced her boyfriends.

A special adaptation of the strip was produced by Rede Globo and shown in 2008. Aline was played by actress Maria Flor and her two boyfriends by Bernardo Marinho (Otto) and Pedro Neschling (Pedro). The special was produced as a series, debuting on October 1, 2009, after the series A Grande Família. The last episode of the series was aired on March 3, 2011,

- Rocky & Hudson – the stories of a gay cowboy couple in the Old West, dealing with tough guys and bandits. Rocky and Hudson names are a reference to American actor Rock Hudson. The strip was made into a feature-length animated film in 1994: Rocky & Hudson and a television series in 2020: Rocky & Hudson: Os Caubóis Gays.
- La Vie en Rose – strips with no fixed theme, dealing with everyday situations.
- Familia Bíceps (The Biceps Family) – about a family of muscular people, that use their strength for everything.
- Anos de Terapia (Years of Therapy) - strips in which certain life situations are related to time of psychoanalysis (bad experiences summing up years, and good experiences subtracting them). One variation is the Years in Paradise and the Years in Hell, whose idea is similar.
- Homem-Legenda (Subtitle Man) - character that always comes up saying what people really mean when they say something totally different.
