= Toninho Mendes =

Brazilian comics creator

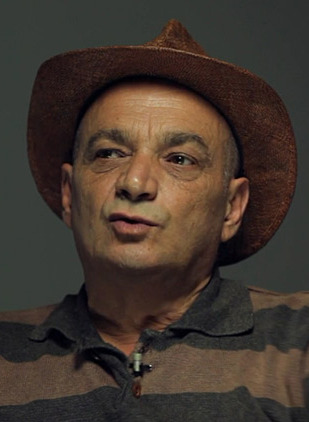
- Born: 30 April 1954 Itapeva, São Paulo
- Died: 18 January 2017 (aged 62) São Paulo
- Collaborators: Laerte; Angeli; Glauco Villas Boas

Antônio de Souza Mendes Neto (30 April 1954 – 18 January 2017), better known as Toninho Mendes, was a Brazilian editor. He started working in the 1960s, going through several publishers and alternative newspapers, such as Movimento and Versus. In 1984, Mendes founded Circo Editorial, considered the most important Brazilian publishing house of alternative comics in the 1980s and 1990s. Circo featured artists such as Laerte, Angeli and Glauco, among other important names in the Brazilian underground comics that achieved prominence in the publications published by Mendes. The story of Circo publishing house was told by Mendes himself in the book Humor Paulistano: a experiência da Circo Editorial, 1984-1985, which won the Troféu HQ Mix in 2015 in two categories: "Best Theoretical Book" and "Best Editorial Project". Mendes also won the Troféu HQ Mix in 2011 in "Best Erotic Publication" category for Quadrinhos Sacanas, a collection organized by him which published anonymous erotic comics created between the 1950s and 1980s.
