= Álvaro Campos (screen writer) =

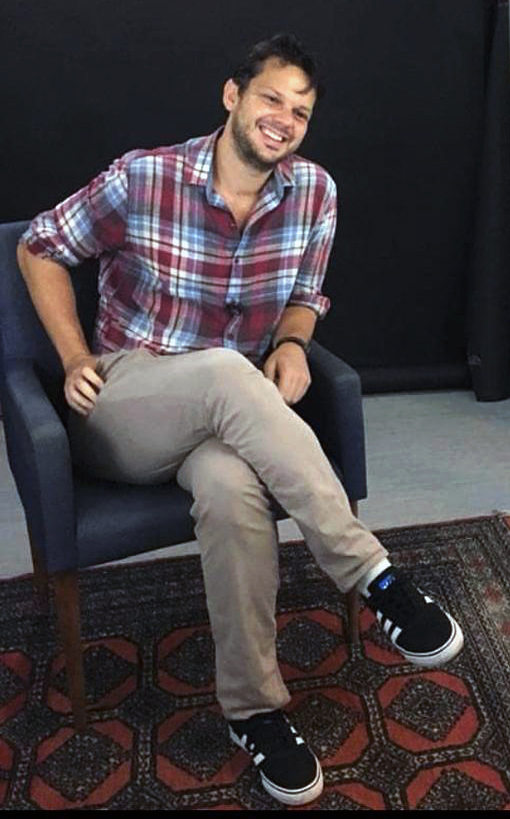
- Álvaro Campos in 2022.
- Born: August 15, 1980 (age 45)
- Education: Federal University of Rio de Janeiro
- Occupation(s): Screen writer, tv director and producer
- Notable work: Senna (miniseries) and Anderson "The Spider" Silva
- Awards: Best screen play, Rio de Janeiro International Film Festival (2021)

Álvaro Campos (born August 15, 1980, in Rio de Janeiro), is a Brazilian film and television director, producer, and screenwriter. Among his works are the miniseries Anderson Spider Silva and Senna.

== Biography ==
Álvaro graduated in social communication from the Federal University of Rio de Janeiro. At 25, he began his career in audiovisual media with the series Os Buchas. Using his own funds, he produced an independent pilot that explores the dramas of the male universe with references to pop culture, such as comics and films. In 2007, the pilot was selected to be developed into a series, later broadcast on Oi TV and Multishow, featuring actors like Gregório Duvivier, Sílvio Guindane, Rafael Studart, and Tatiana Muniz.

In 2009, Álvaro joined the writing team of Furo MTV during its first season. The following year, he contributed to the creation of Comédia MTV, which was awarded best comedy show in 2011 by the Associação Paulista de Críticos de Arte (APCA). In 2010, he wrote the series Open Bar and Os Gozadores for the Multishow channel, starring George Sauma, Sílvio Guindane, Rafael Studart, Douglas Silva, Patrick Sampaio, and Cristina Lago.

In 2014, Álvaro wrote the play O Branco de Seus Olhos, with dramaturgical supervision by Júlia Spadaccini, directed by Alexandre Mello, and featuring Karine Telles as the lead actress. The play explores relationships formed on social networks and addresses the issue of virtual infidelity. It was staged for three months at Teatro Poeira and SESC Copacabana.

In 2016, Álvaro released the short film Leo e Carol, which tells the story of the week leading up to the wedding of Gigante Léo, who has dwarfism, and Carol, a pedagogue who is 1.65m tall. The film won the award for best short documentary at the Inclús Festival in Barcelona after receiving the same prize at the Festival Sur Le Handicap in Cannes.

In 2017, the director co-directed the film Altas Expectativas with Pedro Antônio Paes, where Gigante Léo plays a horse trainer who falls in love with a tall woman. The film premiered at the 41st Montreal World Film Festival, received an honorable mention at the Rio Festival, and was selected for the official competition at the Miami Film Festival in 2018.

In 2018, he co-created the comic book O Outro Lado da Bola with Alê Braga, illustrated by Jean Diaz, and nominated for the 31st HQ Mix Trophy. The comic tells the story of the number ten player of Corinthians who struggles to come out as homosexual. That same year, Álvaro studied at the International School of Film and Television in Cuba under the supervision of Charles McDougle, and at the University of Television and Film Munich. In Cuba, he directed his first solo short film, Madre.

In 2019, Álvaro co-directed the documentary Tá Rindo de Que? and subsequently Rindo a Toa. The first explores humor during the brazilian military dictatorship, and the second, the influence of comedians in the post-dictatorship era. The work features appearances by Jaguar, Juca Chaves, Chico Caruso, and Carlos Alberto de Nóbrega. In 2020, Álvaro directed the feature film Mundo Novo in partnership with the theater group Nós do Morro. The plot explores the perspective of a group of talents from the Vidigal community, telling the story of an interracial couple and addressing the consequences of structural racism in the country and its relation to the geography of Rio de Janeiro. In 2021, the film won the Best Screenplay award at the Rio Film Festival.

In 2023, he participated as a screenwriter for the Brazilian series Anderson Spider Silva, inspired by the life of Anderson Silva, considered one of the greatest MMA fighters in history. In 2024, he co-wrote the film Evidências do Amor, which stars Sandy and Fabio Porchat.

In 2024, Álvaro co-wrote for Netflix the miniseries Senna, to be released in the same year. The series is inspired by the life story and family relationships of Ayrton Senna, one of the greatest Formula 1 drivers of all time.
