= Laerte Coutinho =

Brazilian cartoonist

Laerte
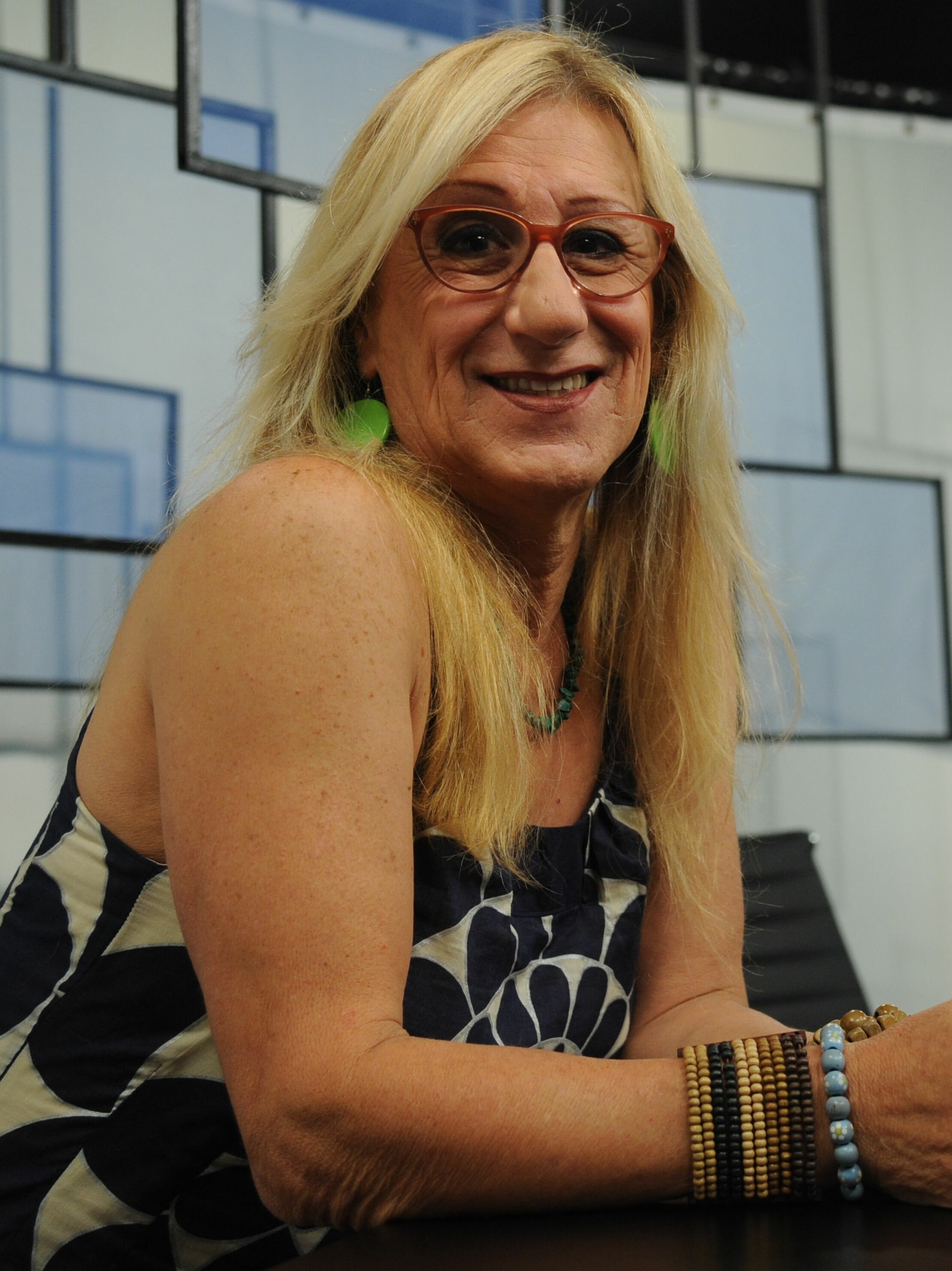
- Laerte in 2015
- Born: Laerte Coutinho; 10 June 1951 (age 75) São Paulo, Brazil
- Notable works: Piratas do Tietê, Manual do Minotauro, Muchacha, Striptiras, Los Três Amigos
- Collaborators: Angeli, Glauco, Adão Iturrusgarai, Rafael Coutinho

Laerte Coutinho (born 10 June 1951), known mainly as simply Laerte, is a Brazilian cartoonist, illustrator, and screenwriter, known for creating comic strips such as Piratas do Tietê (Pirates of the Tietê River).

She was part of the Brazilian underground comics scene of the 1980s. Together with Angeli and Glauco (and later Adão Iturrusgarai) she drew the collaborative comic strip Los Três Amigos. She has done work for publications such as Balão, O Pasquim, and Chiclete com Banana magazines, and draws regularly for Folha de S. Paulo newspaper. Since the mid 2000s, her strips have become more "philosophical" and less humor-focused, relying less on recurring characters.

She is a transgender woman.

== Career ==
In 1968 Laerte completed the Free Course of Drawing of the Fundação Armando Alvares Penteado. In 1969 she began to study journalism at the University of São Paulo but did not complete the course.

She created the character Leão for the magazine Sibila in 1970. During the 1970s, while a student at USP's Escola de Comunicações e Artes (School for Communications and Arts), she worked for the magazines Banas and Placar, and founded – with Luiz Gê – the magazine Balão. In 1974 she did her first work for a newspaper, Gazeta Mercantil.

In the same year she began producing campaign material for the Brazilian Democratic Movement during the elections. The following year she worked in the production of cards of solidarity in the movement of aid to political prisoners. In 1978 she drew stories featuring the character João Ferrador for the publication of the metalworkers' union in São Bernardo do Campo. She later found the Oboré agency specialized in producing communication materials for unions. The company published her book Illustration Union (1986), with a thousand illustrations, comics, and cartoons released for use by unions and other organizations. She did media coverage for FIFA World Cups: those of 1978 (for the newspaper O Estado de S. Paulo), 1982 (for Folha de S. Paulo), and 1986 (for O Estado de S. Paulo).

At the end of the 1980s, she published comic strips for magazines such as Chiclete com Banana (edited by Angeli), Geraldão (edited by Glauco) and Circo, all by Toninho Mendes' Circo publishing house, who would later launch her solo magazine Piratas do Tietê. In 1985 she released her first book, O Tamanho da Coisa, a collection of her cartoons. In 1991 Folha de S. Paulo began publishing her Piratas do Tietê comic strips. She regularly releases albums with collections of her strips, mainly published by Devir Livraria and L&PM Pocket.

Laerte has also worked as screenwriter, co-authoring scripts for comedy shows such as TV Pirata and Sai de Baixo and children's show TV Colosso. She presents a talk-show on Canal Brasil, Transando com Laerte.

== Personal life ==
Assigned male at birth, she came out in 2009 as a crossdresser and later as a transgender woman. In 2012 she was a founding member of the Associação Brasileira de Transgêner@s ("Brazilian Association of Transgender People"). She contributed to the Google Doodle for International Women's Day 2018 by creating a short comic about a man and a transgender woman falling in love.

Her son Rafael Coutinho is also a cartoonist.
