= Otto Guerra =

Brazilian filmmaker and animator (born 1956)

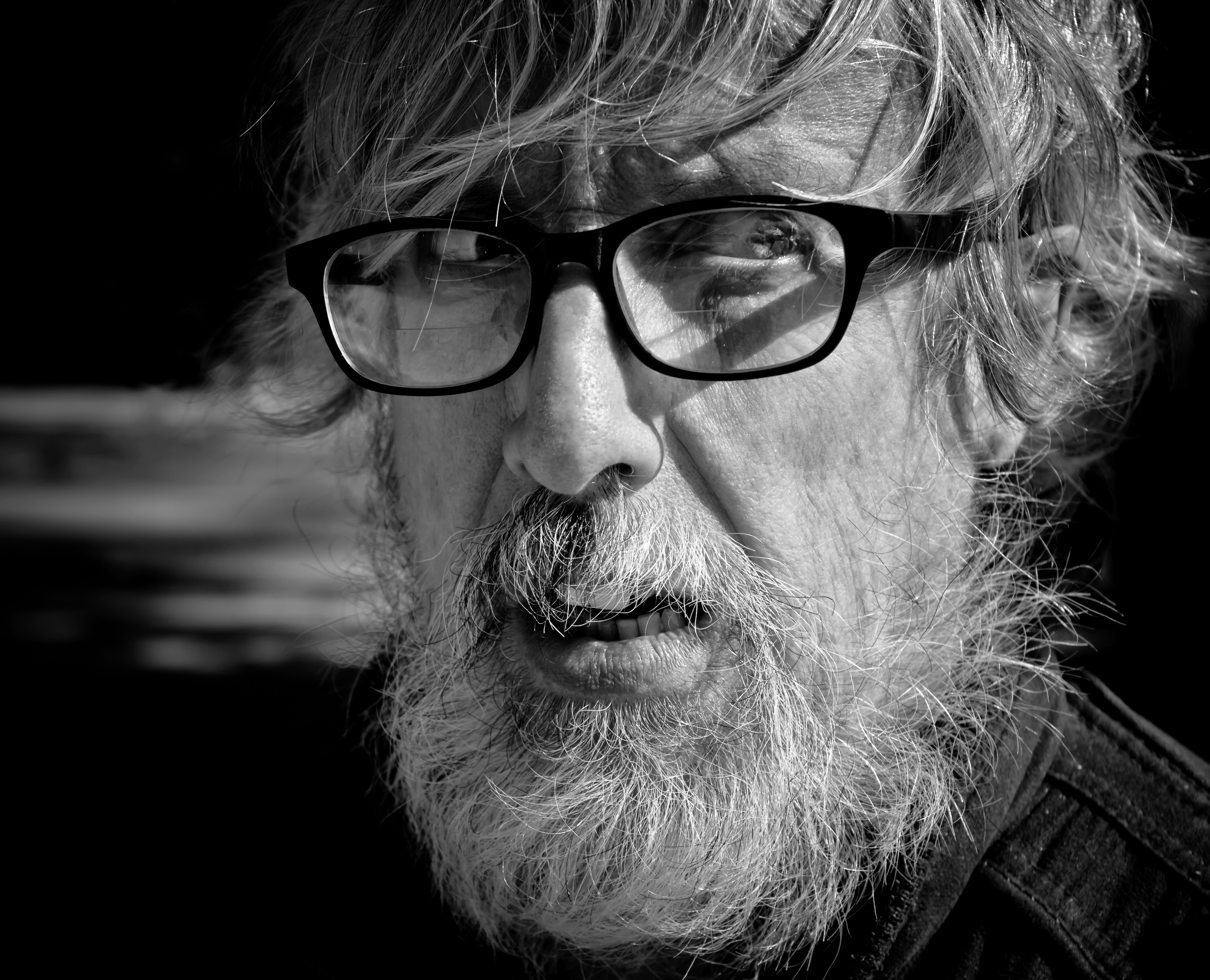
- Otto Guerra in 2021
- Born: Otto Guerra Netto; March 5, 1956 (age 69); Porto Alegre, Brazil
- Years active: 1977 - present

Otto Guerra Neto (born March 5, 1956, in Porto Alegre) is a Brazilian filmmaker and animator.

== Biography ==
Guerra studied philosophy, law and communication, without graduating on any of these courses. He made comics inspired by the Franco-Belgian comics of Hergé. In 1977, he worked in an advertising agency in Porto Alegre, doing animation for commercials. The following year, he founded his own studio, Otto Desenhos Animados. His first short film was O Natal do Burrinho, released in 1984.

In 1995, Guerra released the feature film Rocky & Hudson - Os Caubóis Gays, based on the comic strip by Adão Iturrusgarai. In 2006, he produced Wood & Stock: Sexo, Orégano e Rock'n'Roll, based on the characters by cartoonist Angeli. In 2013, the director launched Até que a Sbórnia nos Separe, based on the musical duo Tangos e Tragédias.

== Filmography ==
=== Short movies ===
- 1984 - O Natal do burrinho
- 1985 - As cobras - o filme
- 1986 - Treiler - a última tentativa
- 1989 - Reino azul
- 1992 - Novela
- 1994 - Pistola automática do doutor Brain
- 1997 - O Arraial
- 2000 - Cavaleiro Jorge

=== Feature films ===
- 1995 - Rocky & Hudson - Os Caubóis Gays
- 2006 - Wood & Stock: Sexo, Orégano e Rock'n'Roll
- 2013 - Até que a Sbórnia nos Separe
- 2018 - A Cidade dos Piratas
