= Clara Averbuck =

Brazilian writer

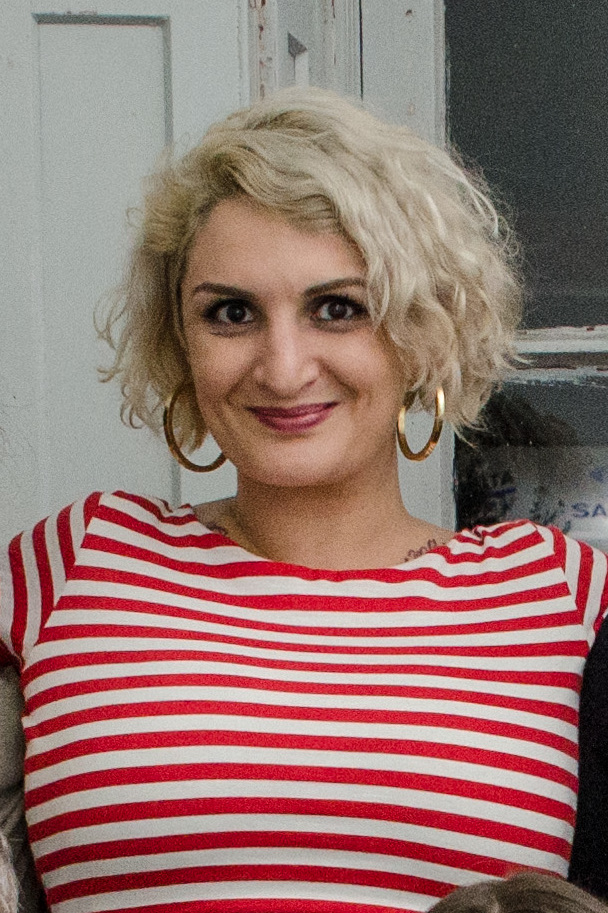
- Averbuck, in 2016
- Born: Clara Averbuck Gomes; May 26, 1979 (age 47); Porto Alegre, Rio Grande do Sul, Brazil
- Writing career
- Pen name: Clarah Averbuck

Clara Averbuck Gomes (born 26 May 1979) is a Brazilian writer.

== Life and career ==
Averbuck was born in Porto Alegre. Her father is the musician Hique Gomez, from the duo Tangos & Tragédias. She attended journalism classes at the Pontifical Catholic University of Rio Grande do Sul but did not finish the course.

She began writing in 1998 for the e-zine CardosOnline, together with Daniel Galera, André Czarnobai, Daniel Pellizzari and others, and also for several blogs. She moved to São Paulo in 2001; her first book Máquina de Pinball was published the following year. The book was adapted into the 2007 film Nome Próprio (Camila Jam), directed by Murilo Salles and starred by Leandra Leal; Averbuck wrote the screenplay.

Averbuck also collaborated for the websites Vírgula and R7.

== Published works ==
- 2002- Máquina de Pinball
- 2003- Das Coisas Esquecidas Atrás da Estante
- 2004- Vida de Gato
- 2008- Nossa Senhora da Pequena Morte (with Eva Uviedo)
- 2012- Cidade Grande no Escuro
- 2014- Eu Quero Ser Eu
- 2016- Toureando o Diabo (with Eva Uviedo)
