= Luiz Gê =

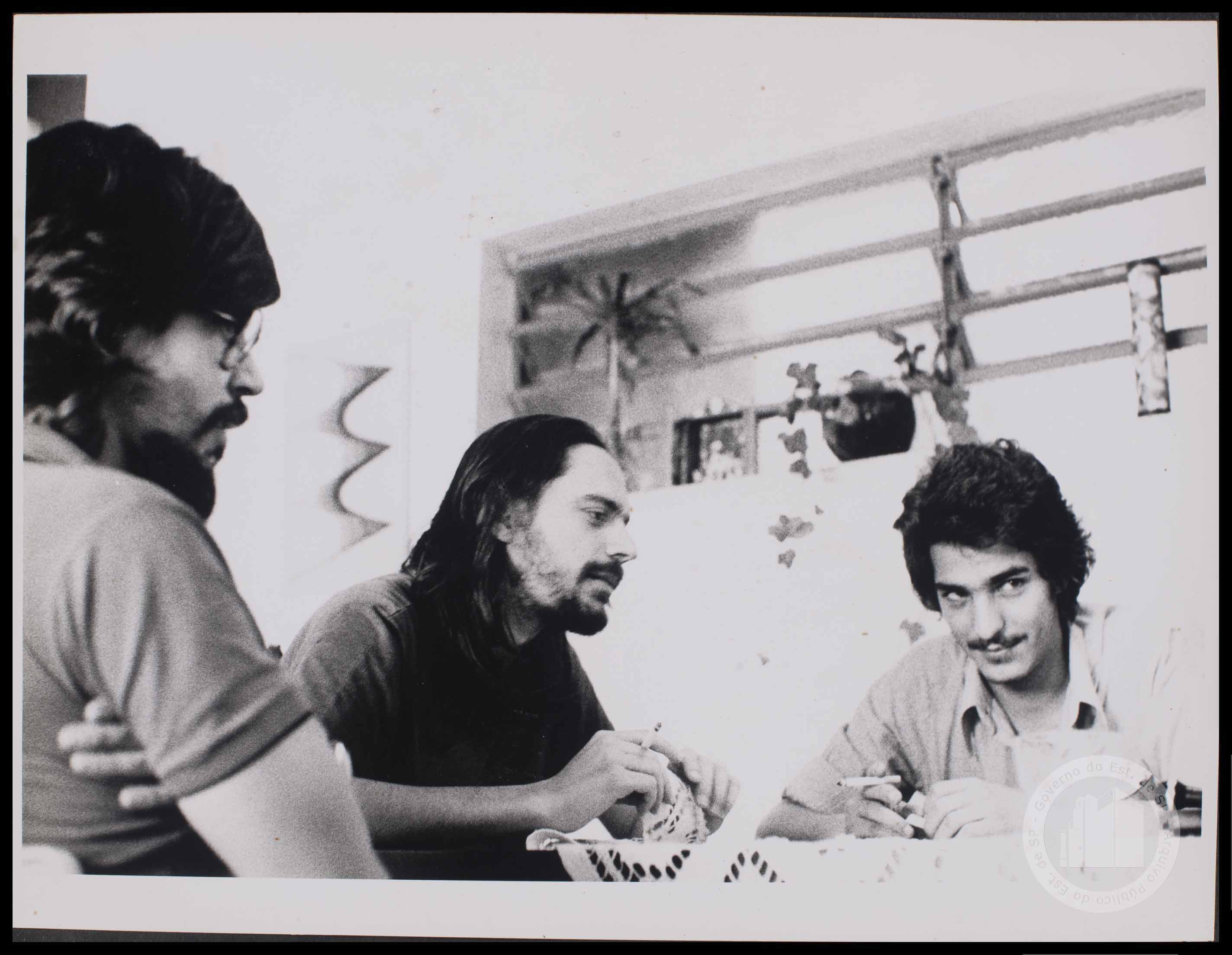
- Luiz Gê (left), with Chico Caruso and Angeli, circa 1970
- Born: Luiz Geraldo Ferrari Martins; 1951 (age 74–75); São Paulo
- Education: University of São Paulo
- Occupations: Illustrator, comics artist
- Website: http://luizge.com.br/

Luiz Geraldo Ferrari Martins (born 1951 in São Paulo), known as Luiz Gê, is a Brazilian illustrator and comics artist.

== Career ==
He graduated in architecture from the University of São Paulo in 1977. In 1987, he went on to do postgraduate studies at the Royal College of Art in London. Luiz Gê is currently a professor of comics in the Industrial Design Course at the Faculty of Architecture and Urbanism at Mackenzie Presbyterian University in São Paulo.

== Graphic work ==
He was one of the founders of Balão magazine (1972–1975), art editor of Status magazine (1985–1986), and editor of Circo magazine (1986–1987). He worked at the Folha de S. Paulo newspaper from 1976 to 1984 as an editorial cartoonist. He also contributed to the country's leading publications, such as the newspapers O Estado de S. Paulo, Jornal da Tarde, Jornal do Brasil, Jornal da República, O Pasquim, and Movimento, and the magazines Veja, Visão, Isto É, and Placar, among others.

He has published and exhibited in Germany, Spain, France, Portugal, the US, Italy, and England. He also contributed to Arrigo Barnabé's LPs Clara Crocodilo and Tubarões Voadores, and was one of the screenwriters for Chico Botelho's film Cidade Oculta.

== Published works ==
- Macambúzios e Sorumbáticos, Editora T. A. Queiroz, 1981
- Quadrinhos em Fúria, Editora Circo, 1984
- O Mal dos Séculos, Editora Melhoramentos, 1987
- Território de Bravos, Editora 34, 1993
- Avenida Paulista, Quadrinhos na Cia., 2012
- Ah , como era boa a ditadura..., Quadrinhos na Cia., 2015
- Fronteira Híbrida, MMarte Produções, 2022

== Awards and honors ==
He won the Casa de las Américas Award at the Second International Biennial of Humor in Cuba in 1981; the Best Artist and Graphic Production Award in 1991, from the HQ Mix Trophy; and the Angelo Agostini Award as Master of National Comics, awarded in 2005 by the Association of Comic Artists and Caricaturists of the State of São Paulo (AQC - ESP).
