= Furo MTV =

- Genre: comedy; satire
- Created by: Lilian Amarante
- Written by: Álvaro Campos (2009); Flávia Bogio (2009); Bruno Motta (2010); Rafael Blecher (2009–2010); Nicolas Vargas (2010); Gustavo Martins (2011); Pedro HMC (2012); Pedro Leite (2012); Yuri Moraes (2013)
- Directed by: Flávia Boggio (2009); Rafael Blecher (2009–2010); Nicolas Vargas (2011); Gustavo Martins (2011); Marcelo Botta (2012); Gabriel Giacomo (2013)
- Presented by: Dani Calabresa (2009–2012); Bento Ribeiro
- Starring: Didi Effe (2009–2010); Bruno Motta (2010); Gui Santana (2010–2011); Luiz Thunderbird (2012–2013); Bruno Sutter (2013); Daniel Furlan (2013); PC Siqueira (2013)
- Opening theme: "Mehn Maashyn: The Man Machine Bollywood Version" (2011–2012)
- Country of origin: Brazil
- Original language: Portuguese
- No. of seasons: 5
- No. of episodes: 700 (approximately)

Production
- Running time: 15–30 minutes

Original release
- Network: MTV Brasil
- Release: March 2, 2009 – September 26, 2013

Furo MTV was a Brazilian satiric newscast produced and originally broadcast by MTV Brasil from March 2, 2009, to September 26, 2013. The program was created by the writer Lilian Amarante and was originally hosted by the comedians Dani Calabresa and Bento Ribeiro. With the Dani Calabresa departure from MTV in 2012, it was eventually replaced with the entry of Bruno Sutter, Daniel Furlan and Paulinho Serra in the show cast.

The show follow the parody news shows format, used in shows like the Comedy Central's The Daily Show and in the Saturday Night Live segment "Weekend Update", which aims to tell the events of the day in a critical, acidic, fun and humorous way. The show hosts also make jokes and imitations of programs and artists from other networks as well as with MTV Brasil shows.

== History ==
The show was created with others MTV's new shows in March 2009, with a running time of 15 minutes. In the second year of the show, began to have more 15 minutes, totaling 30 minutes on air, with the presentation of the new segments.

The show follows the line of fake news shows, as the Saturday Night Live's Weekend Update and The Daily Show, has the objective of show the facts of the day so critically, acid, funny and humored. The comedians make jokes about the other television channels and your artists, also including MTV's shows and VJs. In July 2011, the show arrived at his 500th edition and had special content.

=== The 500th edition ===
On July 19, 2011, Furo MTV completed 500 new episodes, and to commemorate the date, was broadcast the Furo Repórter, a documentary narrated by comedian Guilherme Santana (imitating Sérgio Chapelin, the Globo Repórter's host), as showed when Dani met Bento. Was revealed the backstage of the show, with testimony of the screenwriters and director, beyond hosts routine.

The climate of commemoration was continued throughout the week. On July 20, the show was presented from behind to front, with the inversion in the ordination in the presentation and portions filmed and later showed backward. On the next day, was the Furo Awards, with the awards of the audience with the presentation of the singer Vinny.

=== 2012 season ===
In the fourth season of the show had an attraction the new reporters Paulinho Serra and Tatá Werneck, winning a new set, weather segment, and international correspondents. In interview to the newspaper Super Notícia, the director Marcelo Botta said: "Dani and Bento increasingly mingled and funny are the ones motives to watch the show".

==== Live from London ====
In the 2012 Summer Olympics, Dani Calabresa and Bento Ribeiro traveled to host the show direct from London, with name of Furo MTV em Londres with the special participations of the comedians Marcelo Adnet and Tatá Werneck. With the trip of the main hosts, the show has become hosted temporarily by guests, as Nany People, Bruno Motta and Pitty.

=== End of Program ===
Due to the audience and the repercussion of the program, Abril Radiodifusão decided to continue with its production, even with Dani Calabresa leaving the network. The VJ Thunderbird who occasionally replaced one of the two anchors was tipped to replace Calabresa, but the recently hired Daniel Furlan, alongside Paulinho Serra and Bruno Sutter were added to the team. The program will return renewed, as MTV Brasil's programming Zico Goes said:“é como se o Jornal Nacional virasse o Fantástico”.

The channel's first video was the clip Jesus Humilha Satan, a parody of the song The Rhythm of the Night, in which Paulinho Serra played Satan and Bruno Sutter appears in the role of Jesus Christ.

With the news that the MTV Brasil be discontinued by Grupo Abril, the program's writing team launched a YouTube channel called "Amada Foca", with humor sketches in the style of the program, posted on Mondays and Thursdays.

The end of MTV Brasil in Terrestrial Television broadcast led to the end of the program, as the new MTV, under the command of Viacom. The last program was re-aired on September 30, 2013, during the farewell to MTV Brasil programming before Tchau MTV. The result, the group created an altered version of the program for its internet channel.

The last edition of the program was shown on September 26th, the date on which the channel's last live broadcast was carried out.

==== Prêmio Jovem Brasileiro ====
On November 1, during the "Prêmio Jovem Brasileiro" (Young Brazilian Award, adapted) ceremony, the show received the Young Journalists Award. Dani and Bento accepted the award and joked about the length of the solemnity on the following episode.
