= Até que a Sbórnia nos Separe =

2013 film directed by Otto Guerra

- Theatrical release poster
- Directed by: Otto Guerra; Ennio Torresan Jr.
- Screenplay by: Rodrigo John; Tomas Creus
- Produced by: Otto Guerra; Marta Machado
- Starring: Hique Gomez; Nico Nicolaiewsky; Otto Guerra; André Abujamra
- Production company: Otto Desenhos Animados
- Release dates: August 14, 2013 (Gramado Film Festival); October 30, 2014 (Brazil)
- Running time: 83 minutes
- Country: Brazil
- Language: Portuguese
- Budget: R$ 4,000,000

Até que a Sbórnia nos Separe (Portuguese for Til Sbornia Do Us Part) is a 2013 Brazilian adult animated dark comedy film directed by Otto Guerra and Ennio Torresan Jr., based on the play "Tangos & Tragédias", presented on stage since 1984. The creators of the play, Nico Nicolaiewsky and Hique Gomez, are credited for the voice of some characters and the movie soundtrack.

The film follows the consequences of the accidental fall of the wall that separates a small country called Sbórnia from the rest of the world, and the culture shock that the protagonists, Kraunus and Pletskaya will face.

== Plot ==
Sbórnia is a small country that has always been isolated from the rest of the world, surrounded by a large wall that does not allow its contact with the neighbors. One day, however, an accident leads to the fall of the wall, and later the Sbornians begin to discover the modern customs. Two local musicians, Kraunus and Pletskaya, observe the reactions of their countrymen: while some quickly adopt foreign culture, others prefer to reaffirm the Sbornian traditions and resist imperialism.

== Cast ==
- Hique Gomez
- Nico Nicolaiewsky
- Otto Guerra
- André Abujamra
- Arlete Salles
- Fernanda Takai

== Music ==
The composer André Abujamra used the songs "Copérnico", "Desgrazzia ma non troppo", "Epitáfio" and "Aquarela da Sbórnia" from the play "Tangos e Tragédias", in which the film was based. Two other songs are part of the soundtrack: "Trevo de Quatro Folhas", by Nilo Sérgio, Mort Dixon, Harry Woods and "Rosa", by Pixinguinha and Otávio de Souza.

== Accolades ==
Award	Category	Recipient(s)	Result
Gramado Film Festival	Audience Award - Brazilian Competition	Otto Guerra; Ennio Torresan; Bernard Attal	Won
Gramado Film Festival	Golden Kikito - Best Art Direction	Eloar Guazzelli Filho; Pilar Prado	Won
