= Glauco Villas Boas =

Brazilian illustrator (1957–2010)

- Born: March 10, 1957; Jandaia do Sul, Paraná, Brazil
- Died: March 12, 2010 (aged 53); Osasco, São Paulo, Brazil
- Occupations: Designer, cartoonist, religious leader

Glauco Villas Boas (March 10, 1957 – March 12, 2010) was a Brazilian illustrator, cartoonist and religious leader. He belonged to the Villas-Bôas brothers family.

== Early life and career ==
In 1976, Glauco moved to Ribeirão Preto and, after being discovered by journalist José Hamilton Ribeiro, published his first works on newspaper Diário da Manhã. One year later, he was awarded the International Humor Exhibition of Piracicaba by a jury made up of Jaguar, Millor Fernandes, Henfil and Angeli, and the 2nd Biennial of Graphic Humor and Cuba.

In 1984, invited by Angeli, he began publishing at the Ilustrada section of newspaper Folha de S. Paulo, where first appeared several of his characters, including Geraldão (created in 1981 after a reading The Teachings of Don Juan – a Yaqui way of knowledge by Carlos Castaneda). Other characters include Casal Neuras, Doy Jorge, Dona Marta and Zé do Apocalipse. For younger audiences, the weekly supplement Folhinha created the character Geraldinho, which is a light version (the dash and in the theme) of the character Geraldão.

Geraldinho had a Master System video game exclusively for the Brazilian market, released by Tec Toy, it was an adaptation of Japanese game Teddy Boy Blues.

He joined the cast of writers of TV Pirata and also did some sketches for the children's show TV Colosso, both of Rede Globo, for which also developed vignettes. He edited the magazine Geraldão by Circo Editorial between 1987 and 1989 and during this period contributed to magazines Chiclete com Banana and Circus.

As a musician, Glauco played in rock bands. Glauco had founded and led (for some 20 years) a Santo Daime church in São Paulo called Céu de Maria (Mary's Heaven), and contributed numerous Santo Daime hymns, collected principally in a hymnal called the Chaveirinho.

== Style ==
With an acid humor, quick jokes, clean traces Glauco contributed to the modernization of Brazilian cartoon in the period coinciding with the advent of a generation of post-dictatorship. His subject was the daily life and its degradation, with topics such as marital problems, neurosis, loneliness, drugs and urban violence.

Glauco's name was usually associated with fellow cartoonists Angeli Filho and Laerte.

== Death ==
Glauco was murdered in Osasco in the early hours of March 12, 2010. His lawyer announced to the press that the crime occurred during an attempted robbery which was then followed by an attempted abduction. Glauco negotiated with the bandits, who then led him forth but left behind his wife and his two children who were present in the home. As they left the house, another son of Glauco, Raoni, arrived at the scene and tried to dissuade the attackers, who shot and killed both father and son.

Later this version was denied. In the version related by the Glauco's family, a university student named Carlos Eduardo Sundfeld Nunes tried to convince Glauco to leave his house to tell Nunes's mother that he was Jesus Christ. According to the delegate of the Police Section of Osasco, Carlos Eduardo Nunes had been charged for drug possession.

"The murderer arrived, searched the family, argued with Glauco, drew his gun and started shooting. At this point, the cartoonist's son arrived. He kept shooting and escaped," said the sheriff, who described the murderer as "troubled". The son reacted to protect his father.

Glauco and Raoni were buried in the Gethsemani cemetery, in Anhanguera, north of São Paulo.

On April 4, 2016, Carlos Eduardo was murdered in a prison in Goiás while serving time for another two unrelated murders of a prison officer and a university student committed in 2014. Adriano Silva Guimarães, the man suspected of Carlos Eduardo's murder, was killed in a shootout with police on January 3, 2024.
