= Vidigal, Rio de Janeiro =

Neighborhood in Rio de Janeiro, Brazil

Vidigal
- Neighborhood
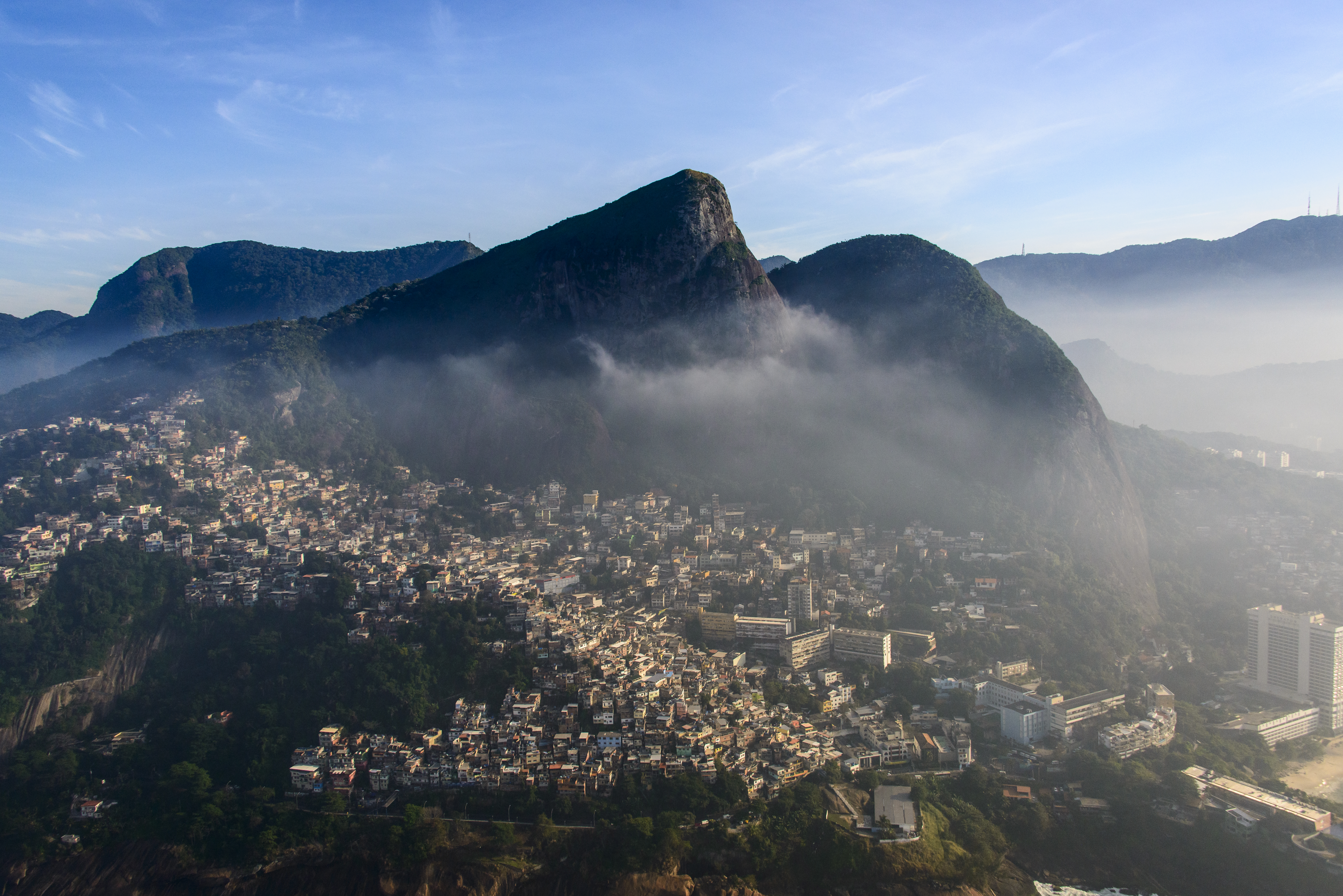
- Aerial photo of Vidigal

- Location in Rio de Janeiro Vidigal (Brazil)
- Coordinates: 22°59′41″S 43°14′19″W
- Country: Brazil
- State: Rio de Janeiro (RJ)
- Municipality/City: Rio de Janeiro
- Zone: South Zone

Population (2010)
  - Total: 12,797

Vidigal is a neighborhood and a favela in Rio de Janeiro, Brazil.

== Geography ==
Vidigal overlooks Ipanema Beach (Portuguese: Praia de Ipanema) and Ilhas Cagarras. It is located in the South Zone of Rio, between Leblon and São Conrado neighborhoods.

=== Morro Dois Irmãos ===
The Vidigal favela is located at the base of Morro Dois Irmãos ("Two Brothers Hill"), which inspired a song by Chico Buarque.

Morro Dois Irmãos is also the location of a very frequented and sought-after Two Brothers trail (Trilha Morro Dois Irmãos). To complete this hike, one would travel to Vidigal. At the base, near Praça do Vidigal, visitors may choose to ride to the Vila Olímpica soccer field (the entrance for the hike) by Kombi van or on the moto-taxis. There are two viewpoints in this hike before reaching the final destination of the peak. The first allows hikers to see Rocinha, which is the largest favela in Latin America, as well as Pedra da Gávea. From the second, hikers can see Serra da Carioca, Gávea, Corcovado (where Christ the Redeemer is), and Pedra Bonita. The highest peak of the Morro Dois Irmãos offers a view of all of South Zone (Zona Sul) ranging from Botafogo to Leblon, including a view of Rodrigo de Freitas Lagoon (Lagoa Rodrigo de Freitas).

== Crime ==
In November 2011, Vidigal and its neighboring community, Rocinha, were pacified by the Pacifying Police Unit.

In September 2017, a so-called coup d'état took place in Rocinha which saw its criminal control shift from ADA to CV (Comando Vermelho or Red Command).

As of December 2017, Vidigal is a completely transformed favela, where arms fire is highly uncommon even though one can see the drug traffickers carry machine guns close to the main street, Av. Presidente João Goulart. In 2020, there were battles between the military police and drug traffickers with fatalities. Vidigal is considered safe for both locals and tourists. It is a vibrant sports, culture, and family community with a daily flux of tourists coming in from all over Brazil and the world at all hours of the day.

== In popular culture ==
=== In cinema ===
- In the anthology film Rio, I Love You, by Im Sang-soo, the sketch The Vampire of Rio takes place in the favela of Vidigal.
- The film A Frente Fria que a Chuva Traz (2015), by Neville d'Almeida, was shot in Vidigal.
- The film Mundo Novo (2021), by Álvaro Campos, was shot in Vidigal.
- The film A Festa de Léo (2024), by Luciana Bezerra and Gustavo Melo, was shot in Vidigal.

=== In literature ===
- The four short stories in Olavo Wyszomirski's Histórias do Vidigal (2015) are set in the favela.
- Several scenes from the novel O Grande Dia (The Big Day), by Pierre Cormon, take place in an imaginary favela called Dois Irmãos, which evokes Vidigal.

== Gallery ==
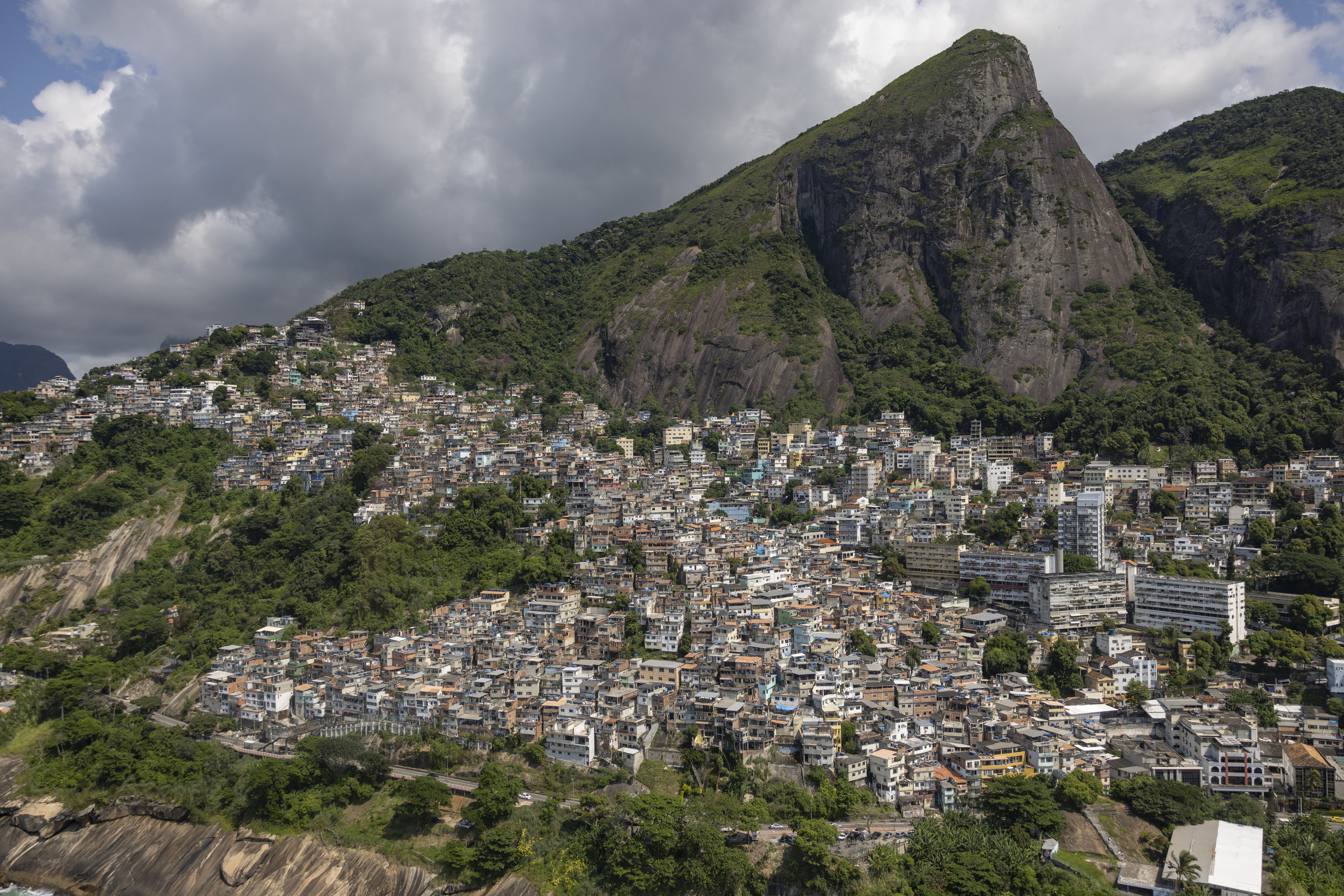
Aerial view of Vidigal

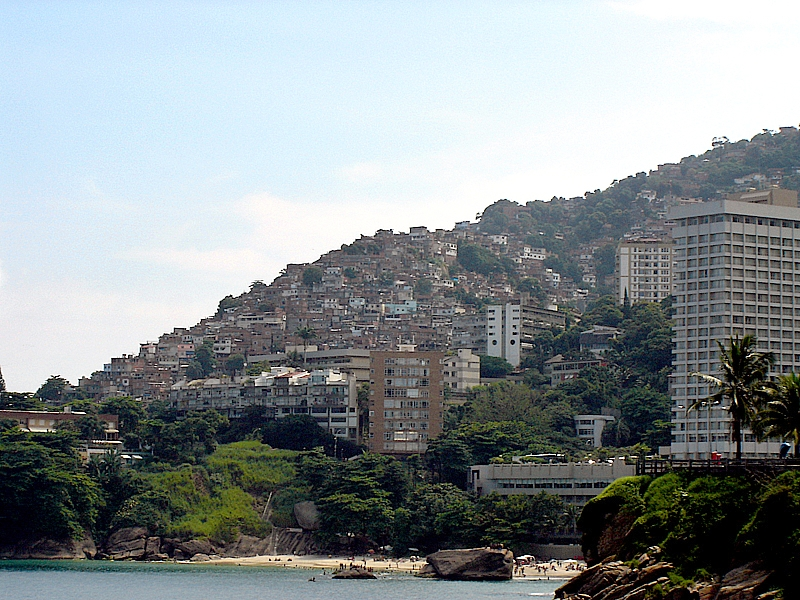
Vidigal. The tall building to the right is the Sheraton Rio luxury hotel

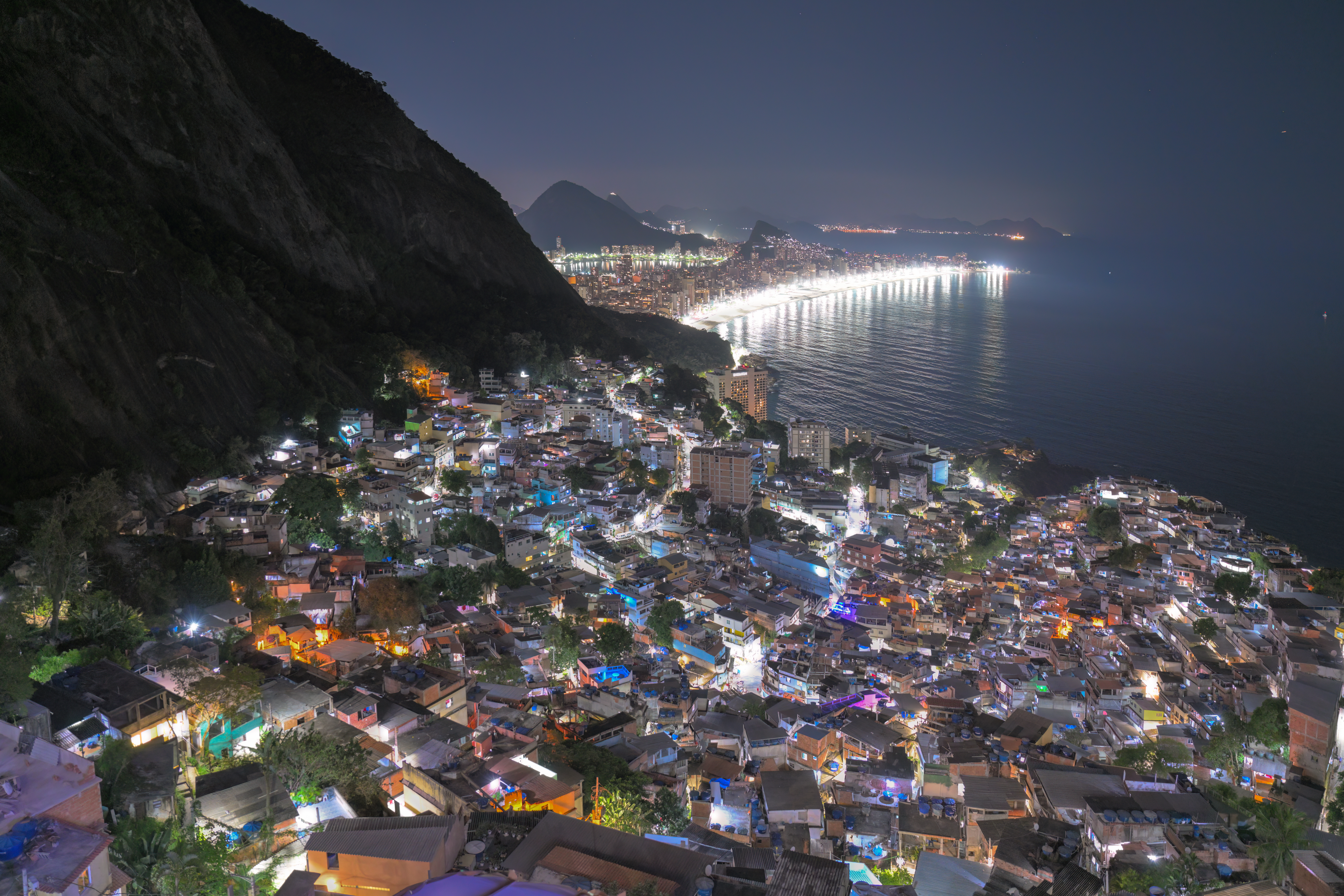
Vidigal at night

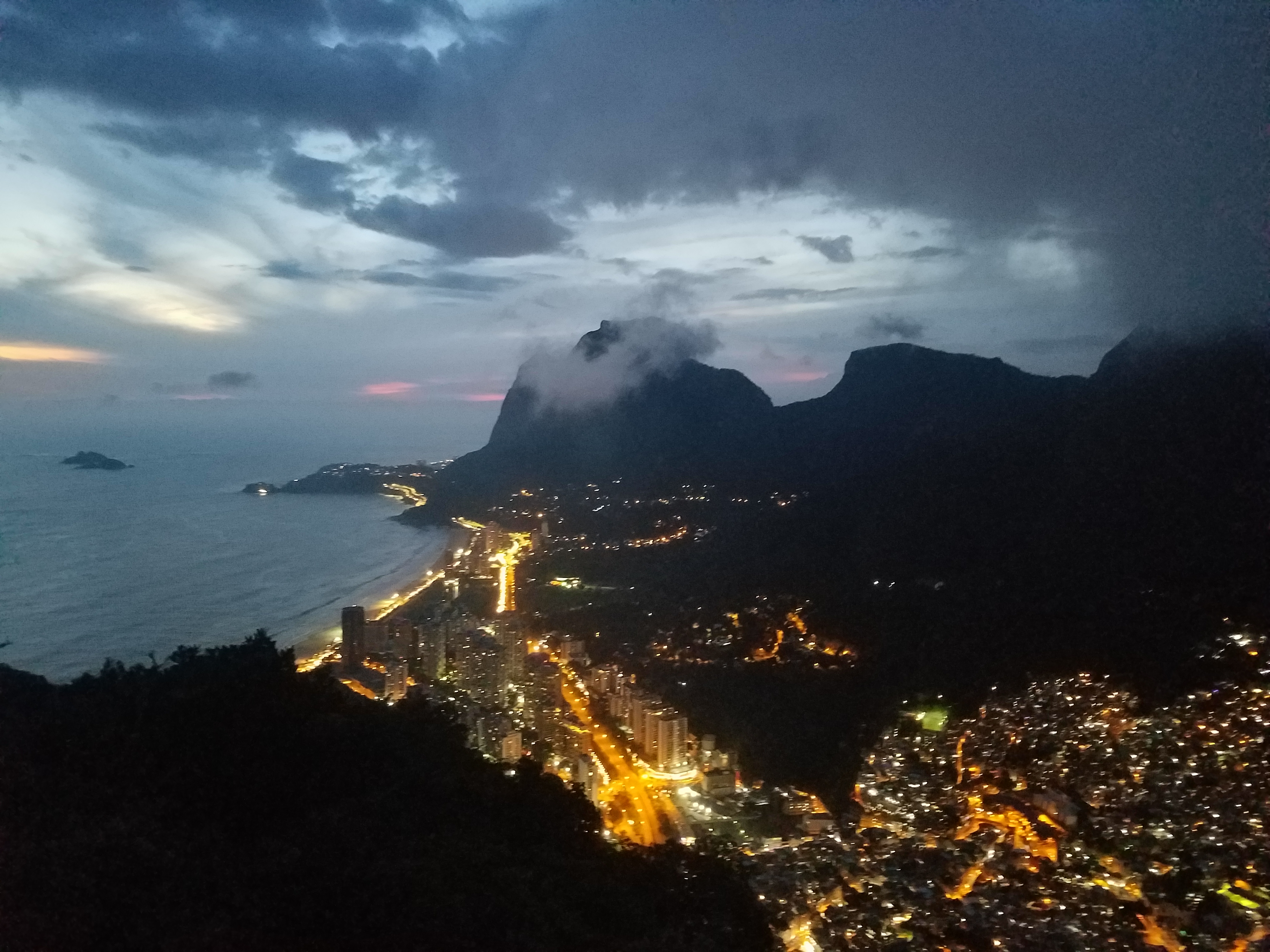
From viewpoint of Morro Dois Irmãos Hike

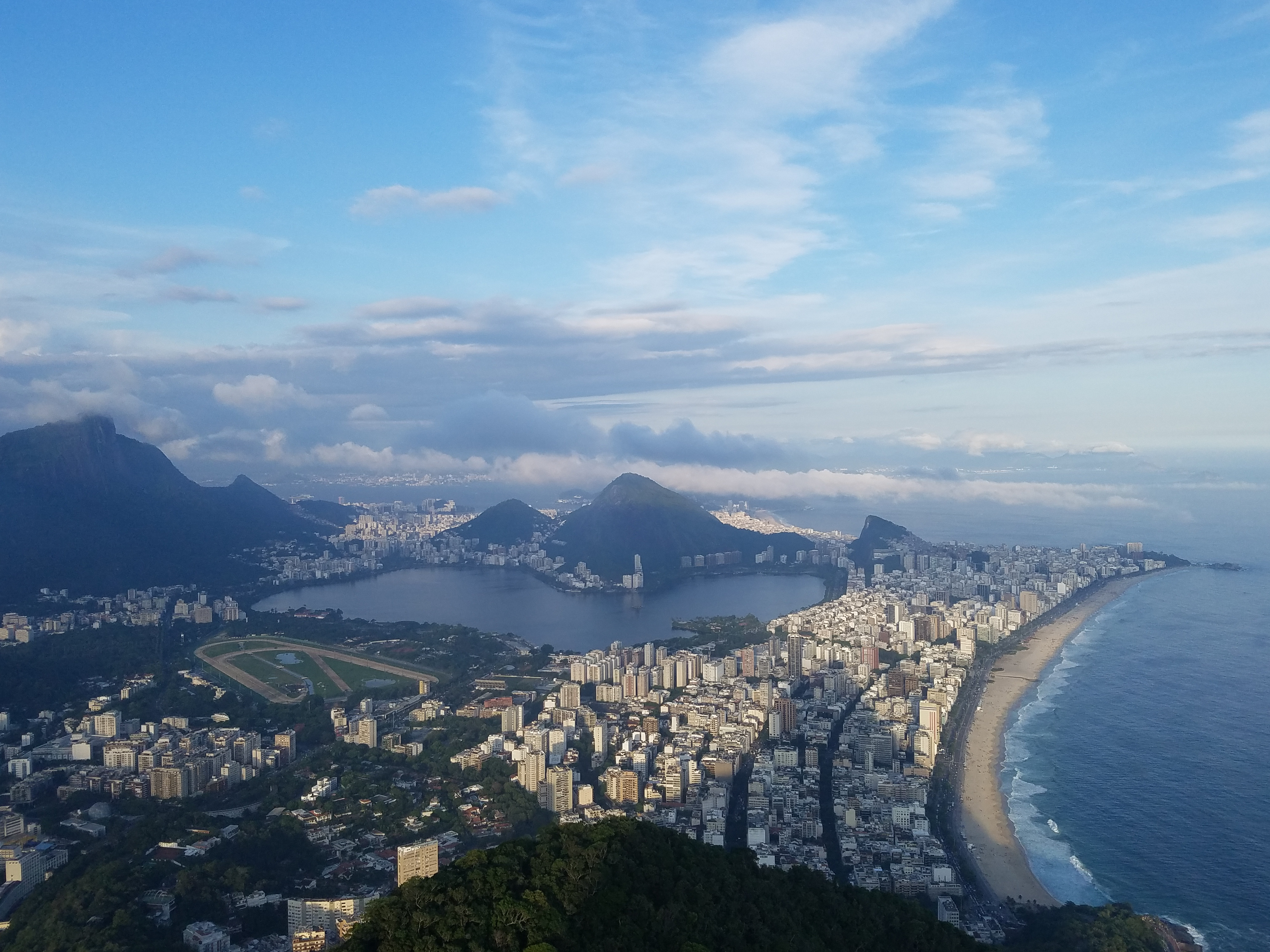
View from highest peak of Morro Dois Irmãos Hike.

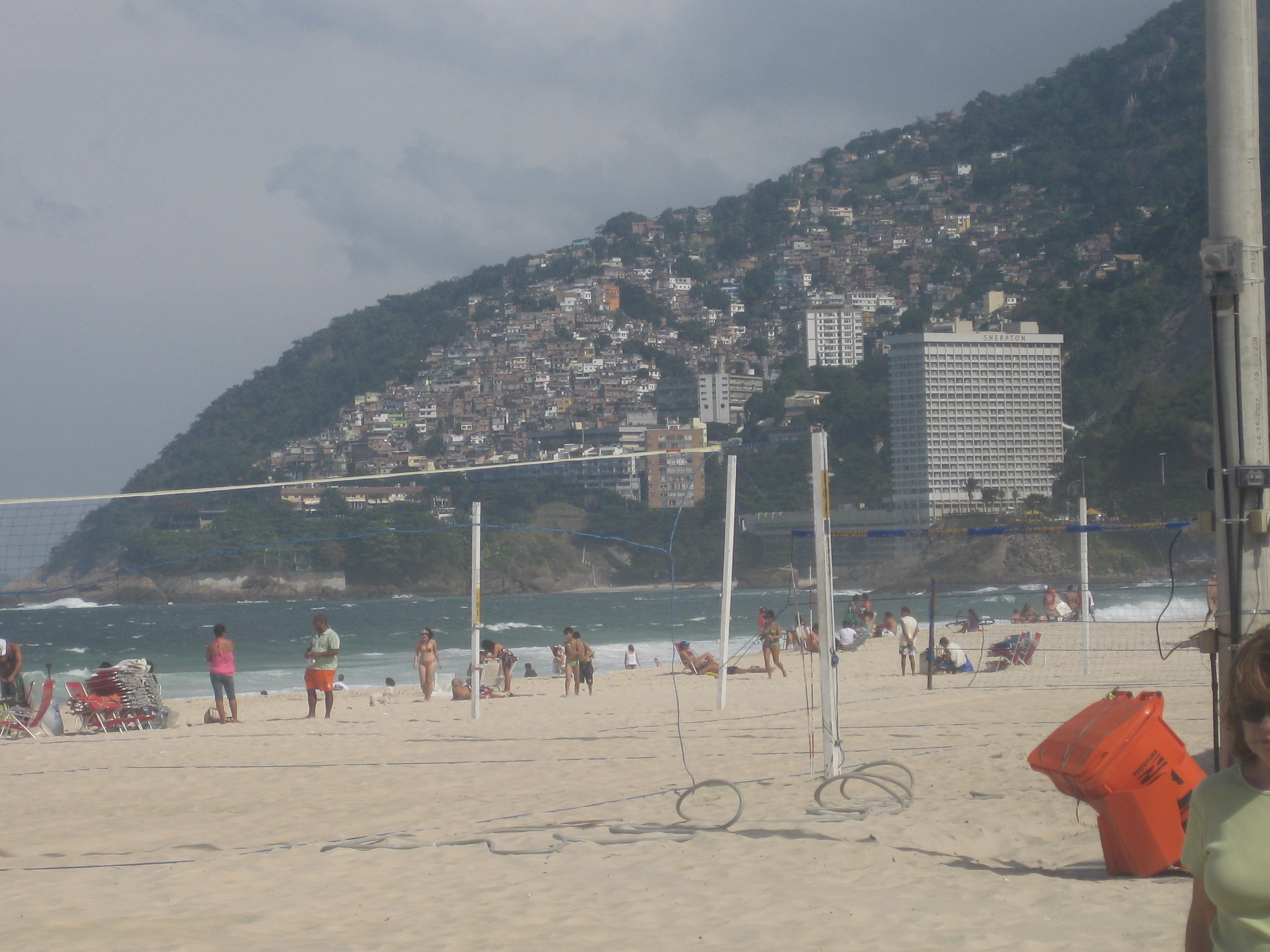
Vidigal watched from Leblon beach.
