= Teddy Boy Blues =

1985 video game

- 1985 Japanese arcade flyer featuring Yōko Ishino
- Developer: Sega
- Publisher: Sega
- Platforms: Arcade, Master System, Mega Drive, Mega-CD
- Release: 1985
- Genre: Platform
- Modes: Single player, multiplayer
- Arcade system: Sega System 1

Teddy Boy Blues – Yohko Ishino (テディボーイ・ブルース / 石野陽子, Tedibōi Burūzu / Ishino Yōko) is a 1985 arcade video game made by Sega. It stars a young boy who is armed with a gun. Each level is an infinitely-repeating maze with several dice. Each die is filled with monsters which hatch out and the player must shoot to shrink, then collect them. If the player does not collect each shrunken monster quickly, it turns into a time-eating bug which flies to the time limit bar and consumes a chunk of it. If you touch one monster or run out of time then you lose a life. The game ends if all lives are lost. There are 50 distinct levels, called "rounds" in the game, even though the counter goes to 99 (the 100th level does not show). The player can play through the levels loops infinitely, with no apparent end. There are also "bonus rounds" every so often; in the Master System version, the player can shoot colored dice to reveal prizes and increase their score.

The name of the arcade version was a reference to a 1985 hit song entitled "Teddy Boy Blues" by then-popular Japanese pop star Yōko Ishino, an instrumental version of which constantly played in the background during the game. An animated version of Ishino also appeared on the title screen and during the bonus rounds.

== Console port ==
In each level, the player must shoot enemies to shrink them, and subsequently collect them.

Sega's console-ported version of the game became a launch title for their Mark III. The exported Master System version is simply titled Teddy Boy and featured different background music as well as no references to Ishino.

Teddy Boy was re-released in Brazil by Tectoy under the title Geraldinho. The hero was replaced with the character named Geraldinho, who originates from a comic strip by Brazilian cartoonist Glauco. This version gives the player five lives to start with, while the original game gives only three.

The game was ported to the Sega Mega Drive, and released online on the Sega Meganet service in Japan. Later it was also released for the Sega Mega-CD as part of the Game no Kandume vol. 2 collection, which consists of Meganet games. It was also released on the SING!! SEGA Game music CD, and the original music is replaced with melodies from several Sega games, performed by the Japanese band B.B.Queens.

== Reception ==
In Japan, Game Machine listed Teddy Boy Blues on their June 1, 1985 issue as being the second most-successful table arcade unit of the month.
