= Daniel Galera =

Brazilian writer, translator and editor (born 1979)

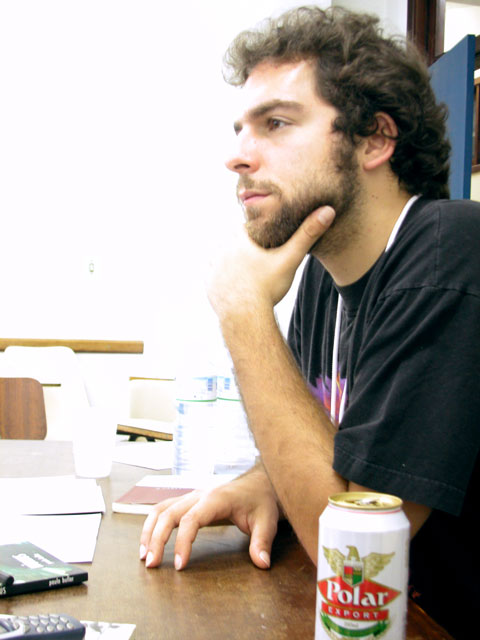
- Born: 13 July 1979 (age 47); São Paulo, Brazil
- Occupation: Author
- Writing career
- Language: Portuguese
- Genre: Fiction
- Website: danielgalera.info

Daniel Galera (São Paulo, July 13, 1979) is a Brazilian writer, translator and editor. He was born in São Paulo, but was raised and spent most of his life in Porto Alegre, until 2005 when he went back to São Paulo. He is considered by critics to be one of the most influential young authors in Brazilian literature. Between 1998 and 2001, as a student at the Federal University of Rio Grande do Sul, he wrote for the literary e-zine Cardosonline; among the collaborators were André Czarnobai (the founder), Clara Averbuck and Daniel Pellizari.

Daniel is one of the founders of the publishing house Livros do Mal and had some of his works adapted into plays and movies.

== Works ==
=== Novels ===
- Meia-Noite e Vinte (Midnight Twenty), Companhia das Letras, 2016.
- Barba ensopada de sangue (Blood-Drenched beard), Companhia das Letras, 2012.
- Cordilheira (Mountain range), Companhia das Letras, 2008.
- Mãos de Cavalo (The Shape of Bones), Companhia das Letras, 2006.
- Até o dia em que o cão morreu (Until the day the dog died), Livros do Mal, 2003.

=== Short stories ===
- Dentes Guardados (Stored Teeth) , Livros do Mal, 2001.

=== Novellas ===
- O deus das avencas (The God of Ferns), Companhia das Letras, 2021.

=== Comic books ===
- Cachalote, Quadrinhos na Cia. 2010 (writer; art by Rafael Coutinho).

== Participation in anthologies ==
- Lusofonica: La Nuova narrativa in Lingua Portoghese, La Nuova Frontiera, Itália, 2006.
- Sex'n'Bossa, Mondadori, Itália, 2005.
- Contos de Bolso, Casa Verde, 2005.
- Os Cem Menores Contos Brasileiros do Século, Ateliê Editorial, 2004.
- Contos de oficina 24, WS, 2000.
- Literatura Século XXI, vol. 2, Blocos, 1999.

== Translations ==
- "Manuale per investire cani" (Dentes Guardados), Arcana Libri, Itália, 2004.
- "Manos de caballo" (Mãos de Cavalo), Interzona, Argentina, 2007.
- "Mãos de Cavalo"(Mãos de Cavalo), Portugal, Caminho, 2008.
- "Sogni all'alba del ciclista urbano" (Mãos de Cavalo), Mondadori, Itália, 2008.
- "Cordilheira" (Cordilheira), Portugal, Caminho, 2010.
- "Paluche" (Mãos de Cavalo), Gallimard, France, 2010.
- "Flut" (Barba ensopada de sangue), Suhrkamp Verlag, 2013.
- "Blood-Drenched Beard" (Barba ensopada de sangue), Hamish Hamilton, UK, 2014.

== Awards and recognitions ==
- Prêmio Açorianos de Literatura: Publishing House of the Year (Porto Alegre, 2003)
- 2012 Granta Best of Young Brazilian Novelists
- 2013 São Paulo Prize for Literature — Winner in the Best Book of the Year category for Barba ensopada de sangue
