= Rafael Coutinho =

Brazilian animator

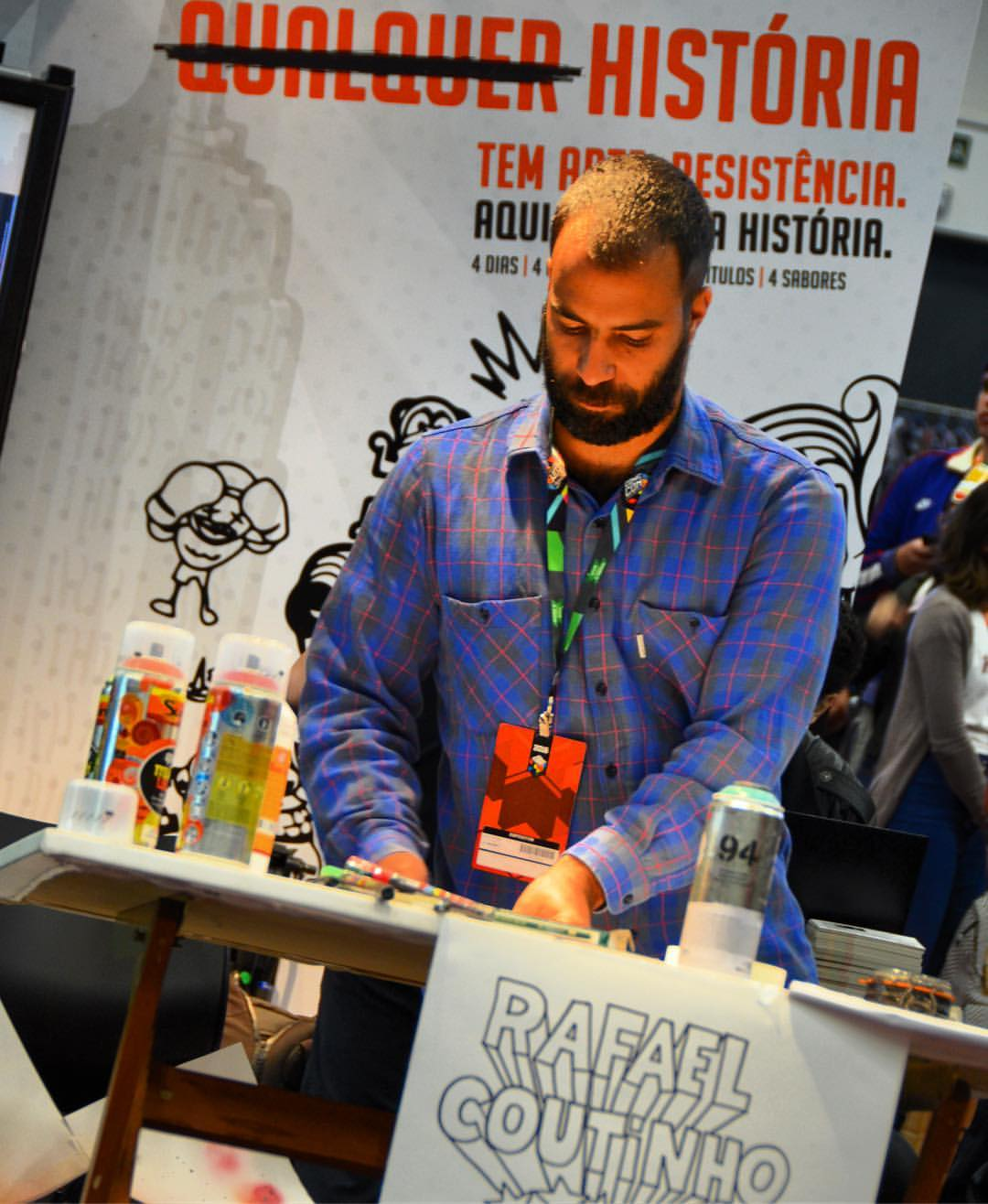
- Born: 1980 (age 45–46)

Rafael dos Santos Coutinho (born January 28, 1980, in São Paulo) is a Brazilian comics artist, painter and animator.

== Early life and education ==
Coutinho was born on January 28, 1980, the city of São Paulo. He studied Arts at São Paulo State University (UNESP). During his studies in 2003, part of his work from a plastic art course were featured in a city-wide advertisement campaign in São Paulo. He graduated with a bachelor's degree in 2004.

== Career ==
Coutinho started his professional career at 16 years old, as storyboard artist for Laís Bodanzky's 2001 film Brainstorm.

Following his degree at UNESP he worked with the art collective Base-V, producing experimental works, murals and exhibitions.

In 2008, 2009 and 2010 Coutinho was part of a series of exhibitions, displaying different visual art works in the Galeria Choque Cultural in São Paulo.

He also published, together with the writer Daniel Galera, the graphic novel Cachalote, in 2010.

Coutinho has been a guest and speaker at different visuals arts, comics and other associated conferences and events.

== Works ==
=== Comics ===
- Irmãos Grimm em Quadrinhos (anthology, 2009, Desiderata). Coutinho wrote and drew the story Branca de Neve e os Sete Anões.
- Bang Bang (coletânea, 2005, Devir Livraria). He wrote and drew the story Sobre Daisy.
- Drink (2010, Barba Negra).
- Cachalote (2010, Companhia das Letras), together with Daniel Galera.
- Muchacha (2010, Companhia das Letras), Coutinho drew an eight-page story with the character Capitão Tigre.
- O Beijo Adolescente (2011, Selo Cachalote).
- O Beijo Adolescente 2 (2013, Selo Cachalote).
- O Beijo Adolescente 3 (2015, Selo Cachalote).
- Mensur (2017, Companhia das Letras).

=== Film ===
- Aquele Cara (Short film, 2006) - Director and writer, with Laerte Coutinho and Tiago Villas Boas. Won the Porta Curtas Award at the Vitória Cine Vídeo festival in 2006.
- Ao vivo (Short film, 2008) - Animation director.
- Torre (2017) - Art director, with Pedro Franz

== Awards ==
In 2018 Coutinho, together with Pedro Franz, won an award in the category "Best Art Director" at the 46th Gramado Film Festival for the film "Torre".

== Personal life ==
Coutino works and lives in São Paulo, he is the father of two children.

Coutinho is the son of Laerte Coutinho, a Brazilian cartoonist and screenwriter. He collaborated with her, working on the comic Muchacha (2010).
