= Geraldão =

Character by Glauco Villas Boas

- Geraldão character
- Created by: Glauco Villas Boas

In-universe information
- Nationality: Brazilian

Geraldão is a character created by Brazilian cartoonist Glauco Villas Boas and is the main character of a series of eponymous newspaper comic strip published since 1981.

== Personality ==
The character is an unmarried and unemployed middle-aged man who still lives in his mother's house. He is an alcoholic, smoker, sometimes walks naked and fights with his overbearing mother.

== Reception ==
The humor style of his strips is usually black comedy, and sometimes nonsensical. Being one of the few intended for mature audiences at the time, his comics have become classics.

=== Children Edition ===
The character has been published in comic books by various publishers with their characters. In the 90s the character also received a children's version and without the obscenity, but still nonsensical titled Geraldinho. This spin-off was adapted by Tectoy for a game in 1995 for the Master System, being an adaptation of the Japanese game Teddy Boy Blues.

The comics were discontinued in 2010 after Glauco's death.
