= Aline (comic strip) =

Brazilian adult comic strip

Publication information
- Publisher: Folha de S.Paulo
- Publication date: 1996

Creative team
- Created by: Adão Iturrusgarai

Aline is a Brazilian adult comic strip created by Adão Iturrusgarai, first published in 1996 by the newspaper Folha de S.Paulo.

== Fictional Story ==
The comic follows the titular character that is a young adult girl who lives a three-way love relationship, making humor about issues such as femininity and sexual liberation. The girl works at a record store, hates cooking and cleaning the house, and lives with two guys: Otto and Pedro. She is said to be a nymphomaniac (sex addict). Others, however, say that she only "gives free rein to the sexual instincts". The author describes her as a "shameless person". Aline remained in the twenty-year-old age group until her last publication in 2009. In 2014, to celebrate the twentieth anniversary of the strip, Adão returned to the character of Aline at forty years old, now with problems inherent to age and a daughter, Luna. However, new stories with Aline being young returned a while later.

== Adaptations ==
=== Cameos ===
In 2005, 5 animated shorts based on the strip were produced, shown by the Brazilian version of Cartoon Network (in association with Warner Bros.), in the Adult Swim block. In the animated version, Aline had the voice of Fernanda Baronne while Otto and Pedro were dubbed by Manolo Rey. Aline also appeared in animation in 2010 in one of the episodes of the talk show series Infortúnio, a Fudêncio e Seus Amigos spin-off, being voiced by Tatá Werneck.

=== Tv Series ===
In 2008 the strip was adapted into a live-action TV special on Globo. The special spun off a TV series that aired on the same channel between 2009 and 2011.

== Reception ==
Aline was awarded as the best national strip in the Troféu HQ Mix in the years 2000 and 2001.
