= Rocky & Hudson =

1994 animated film directed by Otto Guerra

- Directed by: Otto Guerra
- Screenplay by: Adão Iturrusgarai
- Produced by: Lancast Mota, José Maia, Lisandro dos Santos, Andrés Lieban
- Starring: Marco Ribeiro, Garcia Júnior, Mauro Ramos, Sheila Dorfman
- Music by: Frank Jorge
- Production companies: Otto Desenhos Animados, Prisma Produções, Beirute Films
- Distributed by: RS Filmes
- Release date: 8 August 1994 (Brazil)
- Running time: 63 minutes
- Country: Brazil
- Language: Portuguese

Rocky & Hudson is a 1994 Brazilian adult animated film directed by Otto Guerra based on the Adão Iturrusgarai comic strip of the same name. Both characters are named after actor Rock Hudson. In 2020, the characters returned in a television series Rocky & Hudson: Os Caubóis Gays.

Directed by Otto Guerra. The screenplay and art direction are by Adão Iturrusgarai, creator of the characters that initially appeared in comic strips in 1987. The music is by Frank Jorge. The film includes a segment of "The Day Dorival Faced the Guard," featuring actors.

In 2019, the production company Otto Desenhos Animados (by Otto Guerra) completed a homonymous animated series for Canal Brasil, with actors Matheus Nachtergaele (Rocky) and Paulo Tiefenthaler (Hudson) voicing the protagonists. The first season, with 13 episodes, aired from August 10 to November 2, 2020.

== Voice Cast (Cinevídeo) ==
- Marco Ribeiro as Rocky
- Garcia Júnior as Hudson
- Mauro Ramos as Dr. Brain / Silverado
- Sheila Dorfman as Beti
- Mário Jorge as Sheriff Omar / Baskerville

== Synopsis ==
The film is divided into two main segments:

=== The Automatic Gun of Dr. Brain ===
Rocky's archenemy, the mad scientist Dr. Brain, uses his latest invention called the "automatic pistol," a remote-controlled revolver, to rob banks and then attack his enemies.

=== On the Road ===
Rocky receives a letter from his Grandma Beti, the person who raised him, and decides to visit her. Upon arrival, he and his companions, Hudson and the horse Silverado, learn that she bought a bar and became punk and wants the trio to accompany her in search of a sacred Inca totem. However, she soon changes her mind and decides to travel with them "without a destination."

== Comic Strip Origin ==
Adão Iturrusgarai created the homosexual duo Rocky and Hudson to parody "gaucho machismo," but because he thought the theme was very regional, he turned them into gay cowboys. The first publication appeared in the gaucho magazine "Dun-Dun." The name is a reference to actor Rock Hudson, famous for Western film roles and who publicly came out as gay. At the time of the animation's release, they were published in the magazine "Big Bang Bang" by Circo Editorial and in the gay magazine "Sui Generis".

== Festivals ==
The film participated in the Gramado Festival and received awards for Best Audience Film at the 18th Guarnicê Film and Video Festival in Maranhão, and Best Film at the 2nd National Animation Festival. It was selected for the Havana Festival in 1995.
