= Wood & Stock: Sexo, Orégano e Rock'n'Roll =

2006 film directed by Otto Guerra

- Theatrical release poster.
- Directed by: Otto Guerra
- Written by: Rodrigo John
- Produced by: Otto Guerra; Marta Machado
- Release date: April 18, 2006
- Running time: 81 min
- Country: Brazil
- Language: Portuguese

Wood & Stock: Sexo, Orégano e Rock'n'Roll (original title Portuguese: Wood e Stock: Sexo, Orégano e Rock'n'Roll) is a Brazilian adult animated film about two die-hard hippies trying to live in today's world. The film, based on the comic strip by Angeli, was released in 2006. The voice of the character Rê Bordosa is provided by Rita Lee, ex vocalist of the famous Brazilian psychedelic band Os Mutantes.
