= Luiz Thunderbird =

Brazilian TV presenter and musician

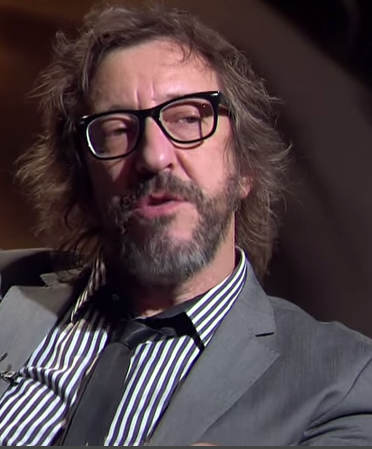
- Thunderbird in 2015

Background information
- Also known as: Thunderbird, Thunder
- Born: Luiz Fernando Duarte; 8 April 1961 (age 65); São Paulo, SP, Brazil
- Origin: Brazil
- Genres: rockabilly blues rock classic rock
- Occupations: Musician; Television presenter
- Instrument: Bass guitar
- Formerly of: Devotos de Nossa Senhora Aparecida

Luiz “Thunderbird” Fernando Duarte (April 8, 1961), also known as Thunder, is a musician, presenter and former MTV Brasil VJ. He also works as a broadcaster, podcaster, YouTuber and DJ.

== Biography ==
=== Early years and studies ===
Grandson of anarchist activist and one of founders of Brazilian Communist Party (PCB), Hélio Negro, Luiz was born in Cambuci neighborhood, central zone of São Paulo. He moved from São Paulo to São Bernardo do Campo, a city in metropolitan area of São Paulo.

He enrolled at Methodist University of São Paulo at 17 years old to study dentistry, graduating at 21 years old. He started his dentistry practice in 1987, working in the area for five years. He left the area and closed his office to dedicating to music as a living.

=== Career ===
After three years working as copywriter in publicity agencies in São Paulo, in 1990, he started a TV career in MTV Brasil, becoming a VJ for program Lado B. As a VJ from MTV he presented several programs including Rockblocks, Top 10 EUA, Ponto Zero and 121 Minutos.

In 1992, he debuted the program CEP MTV, a popular program in the channel, where Thunderbird received artists and bands and read fan letters. In the following year, the director Luiz Ferré paid him a tribute in TV Globo children's show TV Colosso, with a character named 'Thunderdog', a puppet dog VJ who presented music videos in a fictional TV station commanded by dogs.

After years in MTV, he left the channel for TV Globo, the most popular station in the country. In the new channel, Thunderbird participated in the coverage of the Hollywood Rock festival and the Rio de Janeiro Carnival. After the coverages he presented a block on variety show Fantástico and got his own show with a musical focus, called TV Zona, which aired between July and August of that year, during only seven episodes. He stayed at Globo until 1995.

He returned to MTV in 1996 to present Contos de Thunder, a program that aired on Saturdays in which Thunderbird commented on films from the trash production company Troma Entertainment. He signed a contract with Rede Manchete in 1997 and moved to his third network to present the program Perdidos na Tarde. The program aired until 1998.

At the end of 1999, Thunderbird returned to MTV, his third stint with the channel, to present the program Tempo MTV, which celebrated the station's 10th anniversary. He also presented the VJ por um Dia. In 2001, he replaced Marcos Mion in the program Supernova, alongside VJ Didi Wagner. In 2003, he presented the program Dance o Clipe. From 2002, he presented the radio program Tapa na Orelha with Alan Terpins, which ran until 2008 and was recorded in the same studio as A voz do Brasil.

From 2004, Thunderbird moved to MTV's marketing department and worked on off-air programs. Absent from TV, he founded the interview program Thunderview, which is distributed on the Internet. In June 2011, Thunderbird returned to MTV to host the VMB Program, which recalled the most memorable moments of the award ceremony. In interview to news site Pipoca Moderna, Thunder said "I'm happy to be back, especially since MTV has taken music back as its main course."

Soon after, he premiered a series of episodes of MTV Clássica, a program that told the story of four important musical movements. In addition, in the summer of 2012, as part of the Shuffle MTV program, he presented Quiosque do Thunder, in which he interviewed musicians such as Marcelo Jeneci, Karol Conká, Leoni, Gaby Amarantos and others on the beach. In April of the same year, he began presenting Provão MTV, alongside Daniela Cicarelli. From 2011, Thunderbird took part in the MTV program Furo MTV until 2013.

In September 2013, he took part in MTV Brasil's last live program called Saideira, which lasted six hours and commemorated the end of the broadcaster on free-to-air TV in the country.

After leaving MTV, he was one of the candidates to join the team of presenters at TV Cultura, something that was confirmed in November 2013 as the presenter a Brazilian version of the program MythBusters, which ended the same year.

In 2017, he founded a YouTube channel called Music Thunder Vision, which alludes to the acronym MTV, where he covers musical topics. In February 2023, he launched the podcast program Podcast do Thunder.

In 2020, he released his autobiography, Contos de Thunder, written in partnership with journalists Mauro Beting and Leandro Iamin and published by Editora Globo.

== Musical career ==
His first band was Cannabis Sativa, in the 1980s, which was used to get colleagues together to smoke cannabis. His second band was Aerosow, which lasted only a few months. He went on to found Neocínicos.

The band Devotos de Nossa Senhora Aparecida was formed in 1986 by Thunderbird alongside George Germano, Danny Hotten and Roberto Diez. After various formations, the band recorded their debut album, Devotos a Quem? which was released by Radical Records in 1993. Years later, in 2002, the second album of the band was released, Rock'n'Roll. The third studio album, Osciloscópio, was released in 2013 and contains production participation by Xico Sá and André Abujamra, and contains references to rockabilly and electric blues, returning to classic rock. In 2016, Devotos de Nossa Senhora Aparecida released the 30th anniversary album Audio Generator.

In 2006, he created Los Beatles Forévis to play the repertoire of the British rock band The Beatles.

Between 2008 and 2010, he was the bass player in singer Jupiter Apple's band. In an interview, Thunderbird said: “Jupiter is a super friend! It's really nice to play with him”. In 2010, Thunderbird founded the band Tarântulas & Tarantinos alongside Felipe Maia (drums) and Felipe Pagani (guitar). The project features versions of tracks from films by American film director Quentin Tarantino. Pagani, who lives in London, was replaced by Guilherme Held. In 2016, the band released their first albums.

In 2020, he recorded his first solo album, Pequena Minoria de Vândalos.

== Personal life ==
Thunder has not married and has no children. He declared his vote for Guilherme Boulos in the 2024 mayoral elections in São Paulo. In soccer, he's a São Paulo FC fan.

=== Chemical addiction ===
In his autobiography, Thunder recounts his problems with drugs. He says that it was João Gordo, lead singer of the punk band Ratos de Porão, who recommended that he cut down on his cocaine consumption. Marcelo D2, from Planet Hemp, also advice Thunderbird for cut down drugs. Nasi, lead singer of Ira! and his partner in substance abuse, convinced him to go to the clinic where he treated his addiction in 1997.

He quit smoking, but started again in 2009. He managed to get rid of his addiction by taking up sports such as running and cycling. He has already run in the New York City marathon and the São Paulo half marathon.

== Filmography ==
=== TV ===
Year	Program	TV Station	Ref.
1990	Top 20 EUA	MTV Brasil	
1990	Lado B	MTV Brasil	
1990	Ponto Zero	MTV Brasil	
1992	Yo!	MTV Brasil	
1992	121 Minutos	MTV Brasil	
1992	CEP MTV	MTV Brasil	
1993	Rock Blocks	MTV Brasil	
1994	TV Zona	TV Globo	
1996	Contos de Thunder	MTV Brasil	
1997	Perdidos na tarde	TV Manchete	
2000	Tempo MTV	MTV Brasil	
2000	VJ por um Dia	MTV Brasil	
2002	Caça VJ	MTV Brasil	
2003	Dance o Clipe	MTV Brasil	
2011	2011 MTV Video Music Awards	MTV Brasil	
2012	MTV Clássica	MTV Brasil	
2012	Provão MTV	MTV Brasil	
2012	Shuffle MTV	MTV Brasil	
2013	Furo MTV	MTV Brasil	
2013	MythBusters	TV Cultura	

=== Cinema ===
Year	Film	Character	Ref.
1995	Super Colosso	Himself	
2010	Luz nas Trevas: A Volta do Bandido da Luz Vermelha		
2017	A Imagem da Música - Os Anos de Influência da MTV Brasil	Himself	
2018	O Fabuloso Zé Rodrix	Himself	
