= Juca Chaves =

Brazilian comedian, singer and writer (1938–2023)

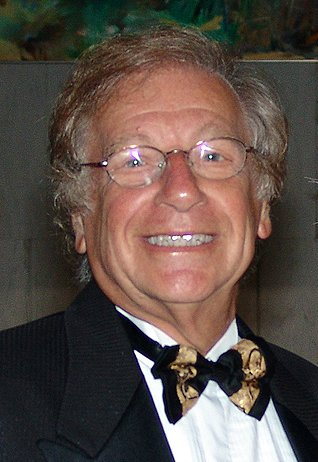

Background information
- Born: 22 October 1938; Rio de Janeiro, Brazil
- Died: 25 March 2023 (aged 84)
- Genre: modinha
- Occupations: comedian, singer and writer
- Label: Sdruws Records

Juca Chaves (born Jurandyr Czaczkes; 22 October 1938 – 25 March 2023) was a Brazilian comedian, singer and writer well known for his irreverence.

== Biography ==
Jurandyr Czaczkes was born in Rio de Janeiro on 22 October 1938. He was the son of Austrian Jewish immigrants. With a background in classical music, he began composing in his childhood. He began his career in the late 1950s, playing modinhas and trovas in a soft style. In the 60's, he set up a circus near the Rodrigo de Freitas Lagoon, the Cantagalo Court. There he presented his show "Menestrel Maldito."

Chaves was a critic of the Brazilian military regime, of the mainstream press, and of the recording industry itself. He became an exile in Portugal in the early 1970s, during the presidency of Emílio Garrastazu Médici, but when his satires of the fascist regime then in power began to gain popularity on television and radio, he felt compelled to move to Italy.

Upon returning to Brazil, he became a television presenter. In the 1980s, he established an independent record label, Sdruws Records.

In 2006, Chaves launched his candidacy for senator in Bahia as a member of the Christian Social Democratic Party, ending in 4th place, with 19,603 votes (0.35% of the total). His campaign advertisements, released in the form of poems, distinguished him from the other candidates. In addition, he ran for federal deputy in 2010, also unsuccessfully.

Chaves was also known for being a fan of São Paulo FC.

Among his song hits are: "Por Que Sonha Ana Maria?", "Pequena Marcha Para Um Grande Amor", "Aquarela dos Sonhos", "Meu Violão Morreu", "Auto Retrato", "Caixinha, Obrigado", "Presidente Bossa Nova", "Dona Maria Teresa", "Que Saudade", and "Take me Back to Piauí".

The song "Take me Back to Piauí" was included in the soundtrack of the 2024 Brazilian film I'm Still Here. The song was also included in the final scene of the 2026 American film How to Make a Killing.

Chaves lived in Bahia with wife Yara Chaves (m. 1975), with whom he had two adoptive daughters, Maria Morena and Maria Clara. He died of respiratory failure on 25 March 2023, at the age of 84.

== Discography ==
1950s

- 1957 Nós Os Gatos / "Chapéu de Palha com Peninha Preta" (78 RPM Chantecler)
- 1957 "Por Quem Sonha Ana Maria?" / "Nasal Sensual" (78 RPM)
- 1957 "Presidente Bossa Nova" / "Menina" (78 RPM Chantecler)

1960s

- 1960 As Duas Faces de Juca Chaves (LP RGE)
- 1961 A Personalidade Juca Chaves (LP RGE)
- 1962 As Músicas Proibidas de Juca Chaves (LP Odeon)
- 1963 O Senhor Juca Chaves (Modinhas) (LP Odeon)
- 1965 Exmo Sig Juca Chaves-Italiano (LP Fonit-Cetra)
- 1966 Il Vostro Affmo.Juca-Italiano (LP Fonit-Cetra)
- 1966 "Per Chi Sogna Ana Maria" / "Ó Naso Mio" (45 RPM Fonit-Cetra)
- 1966 "Pavana Per La Contessa Alessandra" (45 RPM Fonit-Cetra)

1970s

- 1970 Take Me Back To Piauí / Vou Viver Num Arco Íris (33 RPM RGE/Sdruws)
- 1972 I Love You Bicho (LP RGE)
- 1974 Ninguém Segura Este Nariz (LP Polygran)
- 1977 Juca Bom De Câmara (LP Som Livre/Sdruws)
- 1979 O Pequeno Notável (LP Warner/Sdruws)

1980s

- 1980 Marchinha do São Paulo (LP Continental)
- 1983 O Incrível Juca Chaves "Ao vivo ou Morto" (LP Sdruws/ Editora Rocco)
- 1985 O Menestrel do Brasil-Enfim (Quase)Livre (LP Sdruws)
- 1989 Sentir-se Jovem (LP Sdruws/BMG)

2000s

- 2000 Protesto da Criança Inteligente / Humor e Música (CD Sdruws)
- 2001 O Menestrel do Brasil / Sátira/Humor/Modinhas (CD Sdruws)
