= Tangos & Tragédias =

Brazilian comedy musical act

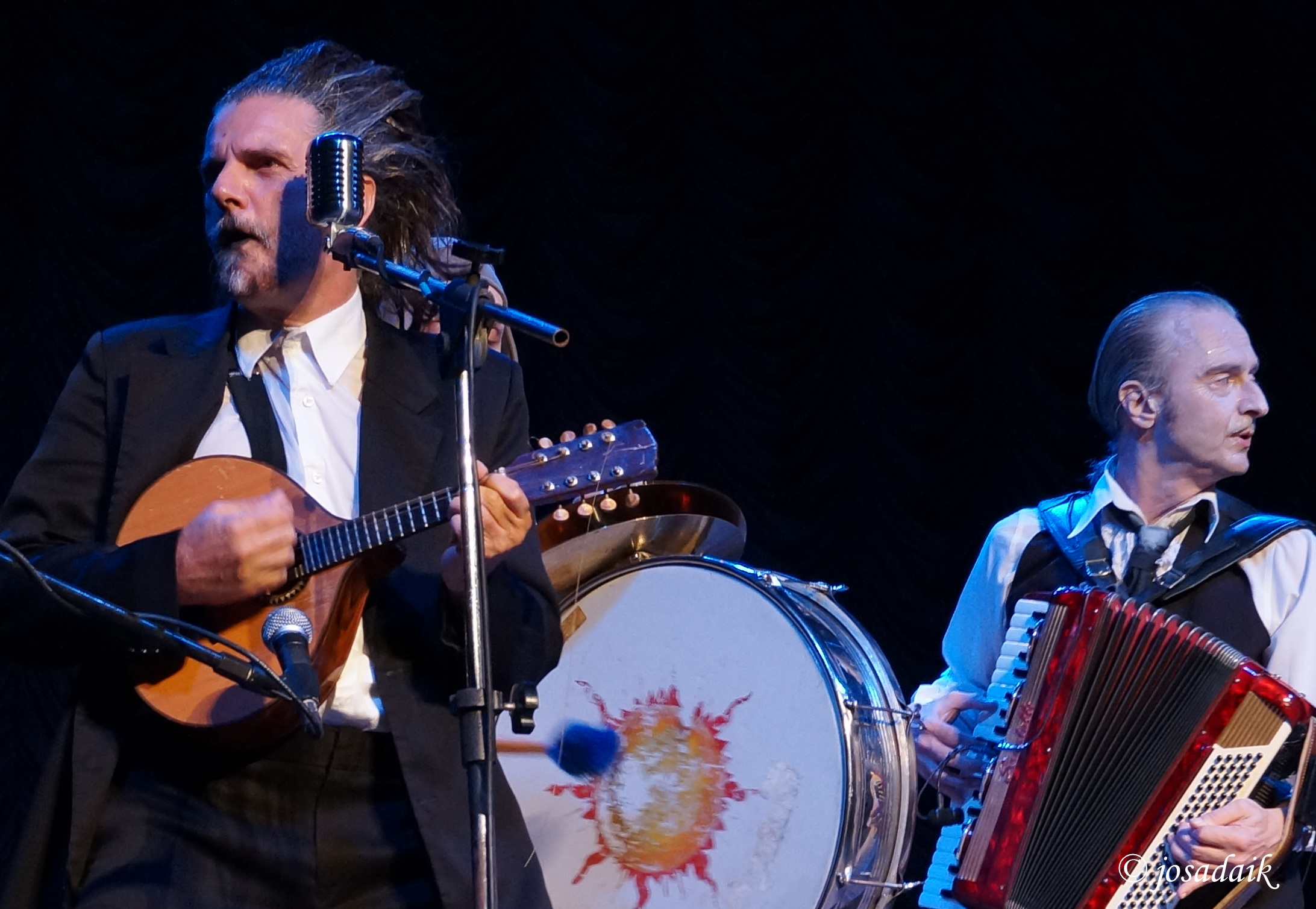
Tangos & Tragédias: Hique Gomez (left) and Nico Nicolaiewsky

Tangos & Tragédias was a Brazilian comedy musical act created by the musicians and actors Hique Gomez and Nico Nicolaiewsky. The duo performed as characters, musicians from the fictional country of Sbórnia. Gomez played the role of Kraunus Sang (violin and vocal) and Nicolaiewsky played as Maestro Pletskaya (piano, accordion and vocal). They presented from 1984 until 2014, when Nicolaievsky died of acute leukemia.

== History ==
Tangos & Tragédias was founded in 1984, in Porto Alegre. Since 1987, they presented at the Teatro São Pedro, during the summer season, in January.

The duo presented in several venues in Brazil, having also a Spanish language version off the show, presented in Buenos Aires (Argentina), Quito (Ecuador), Manizales (Colombia), Cádiz and Donostia-San Sebastián (Spain). They were chosen as the Audience's Choice in Portugal's 2003 International Theater Festival of Almada, and as Espetáculo de Honra, in 2004.

In December 2007 the duo released the DVD Tangos e Tragédias na Praça da Matriz, filmed in 2004, during a commemorative show of the act's 20th anniversary, gathering 20.000 people on Porto Alegre's Praça da Matriz (Matriz Square).

In January 2014, Tangos & Tragédias summer season at Teatro São Pedro was interrupted when Nicolaiewsky was diagnosed with acute leukemia. He was hospitalised on January 23, and died on 7 February 2014.

== In other media ==
In 2013, Tangos e Tragédias starred an animated feature film, Até que a Sbórnia nos Separe, directed by Otto Guerra.
