= Open Bar =

2005 reality television series

- Tyler Robuck, center, and the cast of Open Bar
- Genre: Reality television
- Country of origin: United States
- Original language: English
- No. of episodes: 6

Production
- Production location: West Hollywood, California
- Running time: 22 minutes

Original release
- Network: Logo TV
- Release: August 22 – September 26, 2005

Open Bar is an American reality television series broadcast by Logo TV. The show premiered on August 22, 2005, whilst its sixth and final episode aired on September 26, 2005. Filmed in West Hollywood, California, the series chronicled the daily activities of Tyler Robuck as he attempted to open a gay bar named ICandy.

== Episode Summaries ==
=== Welcome to iCandy ===
Tyler Robuck is introduced, explaining that he grew up just like everyone else, except gay and in the closet. He came out but struggled with feelings of depression. One day while out for a run, he felt like God spoke to him, telling him to open a gay bar, so he moved to West Hollywood.

Tyler meets with Richard Heyman, a restaurant developer. Coincidentally, a prime location becomes available within 24 hours of their meeting and they sign escrow papers. Tyler refinances his house and puts up his life savings for the first $200,000 of the one million dollars he needs to raise. He discusses his plans with his mother and Richard Cooley, owner of West Hollywood gay bar The Abbey. Both offer little encouragement and try to impress upon him the enormous amount of work opening and running a bar entails.

Demolition begins and consumes all of Tyler's capital. He and Richard throw a party for potential investors but a tipsy Richard annoys Tyler by talking more about Tyler's coming out than the plan for the bar. They raise only $80,000 instead of the half-million they'd hoped for. That combined with a new roof that leaks and Richard's decision to travel to Paris leads an irritated Tyler to sever his ties with Richard. Construction is halted pending city permits.

=== One Step Forward, Two Steps Back ===
Tyler has 45 days to open the bar by Gay Pride Day. With Richard out, Tyler tries to find a new contractor.

With 40 days left, Tyler decides to talk to Richard. They work out their differences and renew their partnership.

With 36 days to open, Tyler still does not have construction permits. They decide to split the permitting into interior and exterior. The interior permit is approved but the exterior permit is held up.

With 30 days left to open, general manager Yawar Charlie begins reviewing applications for bar staff. The exterior permit is still being held up, now because the city has concerns about the menu. With 25 days to go, staff interviews begin and Tyler has more items added to the menu, but the permit is still not approved.

=== Trial by Fire ===
Tyler's father Terry comes for a visit. Tyler shows him the sketches for the bar and they interview about how Tyler came out to him. After seeing the sketches and touring the location, Terry decides to invest.

With 24 days to open the exterior permit is still being held up over the menu. Finally the city is satisfied with the menu and the permit is issued. Exterior demolition begins. 22 days before opening day, Yawar and Tyler schedule "callbacks" for bartenders.

With 20 days to go and needing to raise $600,000 more, Tyler decides to hold a tasting for his investors in hopes of raising more money. His kitchen staff is less than pleased with that idea since the kitchen is not yet up to health department code. The bartender callbacks go off and Tyler and his managers end up a little drunk.

With 14 days left before opening and $550,000 to raise, Tyler and Yawar hire 15 bartenders, 10 barbacks and 10 servers. Tyler organizes a tasting party to allow the investors to offer feedback on the menu.

=== The Best Laid Plans ===
With eight days to go and in need of $400,000 more, Tyler continues to hold investor meetings but is continually frustrated by how slow response is. One week before the opening, he meets with his largest investor, Greg, who agrees to put up another $60,000 to ensure the budget to open.

A burned out Tyler takes a weekend off and spends the time with his ex-boyfriend Benjamin. After the weekend his mother and stepfather come for a visit and tour the bar. She is shocked at how rough the bar still is and expresses great doubt that he will be able to open on time.

=== Crunch Time! ===
With three days to go before the opening, Tyler breaks away for his weekly charity work delivering meals for Project Angel Food. Back at the bar, Tyler finally raises the last of the million dollars.

With two days to go, Yawar is frustrated that he is unable to train the staff on the computer system because the bar is still so heavily under construction. He meets with the kitchen staff, who all express their doubts that the opening will come off. He brings in the staff and goes over policies.

It's 29 hours before opening. Tyler lists off all the construction that needs to be completed and all the inspections that need to be passed. As Yawar and Tyler talk about trying to train the staff, Yawar gets a frantic call from chef Luis reporting that the grease trap is smoking. Tyler arrives just in time to keep it from catching fire.

With seven hours to open the health inspector in conducting the final inspection. There are a few minor things that need to be corrected but the bar passes inspection. With two hours to open Yawar discovers that the phone lines are not working so the bar cannot accept credit cards.

With moments to go, Tyler heads toward the bar as the staff continues to put in final touches.

=== The Grand Opening ===
iCandy opens with a large turnout. Tyler gathers together the team that put the bar together and offers his thanks and congratulations over champagne.

While the bar is open, it's still unfinished. Lights, tiles and paint are damaged or incomplete. The credit card system still is not working so Tyler finally decides to comp all the drinks rather than deal with manual credit card processing. Adam, Tyler's assistant, expresses disappointment that Tyler did not express gratitude for his help. Despite the problems the opening is a success.

With the opening past, the next morning work starts again to fix everything in anticipation of Gay Pride weekend, a week away. Adam and Tyler talk about Adam's hurt feelings and they smooth things over.

It's the day of the pride parade and the bar is empty. Tyler explains that with there being such a rush to open there was not the opportunity to promote the bar and that he had counted on word of mouth. Following the poor weekend he begins promotion efforts, including landing himself on the cover of Frontiers magazine.

One month after the opening, Tyler reflects on his experiences. He notes that each week has beaten the previous week in revenue. Now that the bar is open, he plans to spend more time integrating himself into the gay community.

== Following the series ==
Robuck sold iCandy in April 2007 and it has become Seven, a straight bar. In 2009, the straight bar was officially closed. Robuck is reportedly producing a reality series "about the gay community." The space is currently occupied by the Surly Goat, which opened in 2010.
