= TV Colosso =

Brazilian children's television series

- Genre: Children's; Comedy
- Created by: Boninho; Luiz Ferré; Beto Dorneles
- Written by: Laerte Angeli Glauco; Luiz Gê; Fernando Gonsales; Valério Campos; Toninho Neto
- Directed by: Luiz Ferré; Mário Meirelles; Boninho; Roberto Dornelles
- Voices of: Carlos Seidl Carmen Sheila Garcia Júnior Guilherme Briggs Hamilton Ricardo Hércules Franco Isis Koschdoski Márcio Simões Marco Antônio Costa Marco Ribeiro Mário Jorge Mauro Ramos Mônica Rossi Reynaldo Buzzoni Sheila Dorfman
- Opening theme: "Eu não Largo o Osso"
- Ending theme: "Eu não Largo o Osso" (instrumental)
- Composers: Michael Sullivan; Paulo Massadas
- Country of origin: Brazil
- Original language: Portuguese
- No. of seasons: 5
- No. of episodes: 180

Production
- Executive producer: Flávio Goldemberg
- Producers: Mara Martins; Sérgio Barata; Lisa Cisconeto; Gilson de Souza
- Production locations: Rio de Janeiro City, Rio de Janeiro, Brazil
- Camera setup: Multi-camera
- Running time: 240 minutes
- Production company: Central Globo de Produção

Original release
- Network: Rede Globo
- Release: 19 April 1993 – 3 January 1997

TV Colosso (also known as The Hot Dog Channel) was a Brazilian children's television series produced by Rede Globo, that began on April 19, 1993, and finished on January 3, 1997. The show utilized puppets, body puppets, remote-controlled animatronics and bluescreen puppets. It stars a group of working dogs in a TV station that struggle to put her TV shows on air.

The show presented the fictional programs "Jornal Colossal"; "Clip-Cão"; "Pedigree", a parody of Rede Globo's soap operas; "As Aventuras do Super-Cão"; "Olimpíadas de Cachorro"; "Acredite Se Puder" (Believe it if you can) satirizing Ripley's Believe It or Not!; "ColosShow"; "Asfalto Quente"; "Aprendendo Prá Cachorro"; "CapaShow"; and others.

The show was created by Luiz Ferré, a graphic artist, who also created its characters; and directed by J. B. de Oliveira (Boninho), famous for Rede Globo's hits No Limite (Brazilian version of Survivor) and Big Brother Brasil. The puppets were all made by Roberto Dornelles from Ferré's own puppet company Criadores e Criaturas (100 Modos).

It was a big hit on Brazil and worldwide, but was cancelled due to intense production costs. The show was also broadcast in Japan by NHK.

In 2009, the show's return in April of the same year was discussed by the producer, but not happened. Also in that year, it was reported that a DVD box set featuring the show's most important episodes and a Broadway-inspired musical were in works.

On October 12, 2016, the show resumed production as a webseries for Playkids. It was also syndicated on Viva from October 7, 2024 to January 3, 2025 and is currently available on Globoplay. On March 8 of the same year, it was adapted into a stage musical similar to The Lion King and Avenue Q.

== History ==
After the ending of Xou da Xuxa in 1993, TV Globo wanted a new children's show for filling the timeslot. Director Boninho got in touch with the artist Luiz Ferré to create a concept for the program.

== Characters ==
- Priscila, a charming female sheepdog, main and only producer and also an artist.
- Gilmar (Manny) and his 20.000 Gilmar workers, the group of working dogs.
- JF, the pessimistic TV Colosso CEO and mentor, probably a reference to J.R. Ewing.
- Capachildo Capachão, JF's servile assistant. His name is a reference to capacho (Portuguese for to doormat).
- Borges, the bulldog picture director.
- Bullborg, Borges' robotic assistant.
- Walter Gate, the Jornal Colossal host, an homage to Walter Cronkite and to Jornal Nacional host William Bonner, and a reference to Watergate.
- Waltinho, Walter Gate's son, who works as a field reporter.
- Peggy Sunshine, the female weather Rough Collie.
- Paulo Paulada, the security dog, who loves to clobber people with a club, even the studio workers.
- Jaca Paladium, the host of "Acredite Se Puder", an homage to Jack Palance in Ripley's Believe It or Not!.
- Vira-Lata de Aço, the show's antagonist.
- Camera Ney, the cameraman dog.
- Roberval, the chocolate thief.
- Castilho, Priscila's annoying boyfriend.
- Bob Dog, Priscila's rock 'n' roll star.
- Daniel, a keyboarding dog.
- Malabi, the magician dog.
- Thunderdog, the musician dog and a charicature of Luiz Thunderbird.
- Professor Haftas Arden, the scientist dog. His name is a reference to burning Aphthous ulcer in Portuguese.
- Ajudante, Professor's assistant.
- Dr. Frankenstof, Professor's brother.
- Dr. Kobalski, Frankenstof's assistant, probably a reference to one character in Voyage to the Bottom of the Sea (Kowalski)
- Godoy, the elderly dog.
- Bóris, the not-so-haunted house dweller.
- Astor, Bóris' assistant.
- Nestor, the repairing dog.
- The Puppies, three child dogs that are avid watchers of Jaca Paladium's segments. Usually they doubt the validity of his tall tales, until Paladium himself invades their house and threatens them for not believing him.
- Carlota, Tv Colosso's cleaning maid.
- Peteleco, the dog that was kidnapped in Rede Globo's telenovela A Lua Me Disse.
- Parmessão & Provolone, the comic pair.
- Supercão, the show's super-hero and Gilmar's alter ego.
- The Megatrio, three mischievous fleas that enjoy causing havoc on TV Colosso Studios. Their names are Megabite, Megatron and Megareth.
- Professor Gagá, the rock 'n' roll singer and professor rooster.
- Capachete Capachona, Capachão's professional friend.
- Laerte Canini, TV Colosso's scriptwriter and a reference to the show's scriptwriter and cartoonist Laerte Coutinho.
- Detetive Farofinha, the Sherlock Holmes dog counterpart.
- the winning Viking girl dogs of Capachão's Capashow.
- the fairy dogparents who lose the Capashow to her rival Viking girl dogs.
- Plínio Bragança Cardoso, son of the Bragança Cardoso family and the protagonist of TV Colosso's telenovela "Inimigos Para Sempre". He has a relationship with Marina Couto Pereira despite its parents' hostility towards the Bragança Cardoso family.
- Marina Couto Pereira, daughter of the Couto Pereira family and the female protagonist from "Inimigos Para Sempre". She has a crush towards Plínio Bragança Cardoso while its parents seen to have heartlessness towards the Couto Pereira clan.
- Pelados, the rebel boys from the high school who appreciate milkshakes, sports, heavy metal songs and scamming and tormenting the Peludos.
- Peludos, the kind-hearted and sensitive boys from the same school as Pelados who, in contrast to them, appreciate classical music, romantic poetry and studying a lot to fulfill their destiny.
- Shirley, the popular girl from the high school who loves both the Pelados and the Peludos and despises their cruelty, violence and heartlessness towards each other.
- Delicatessen, the princess protagonist from "A Princesa Pirata" who desires to be a pirate in order to ease their boringness.

== Making ==
The 28 puppets were 25 dogs and 3 fleas.

The body puppets needed dancers to control its movements.

The puppets needed electronic puppeteers and voice actors.

The puppet mechanisms were made by Inventiva Bonecos e Cenários, Ltda. who visited Los Angeles studios searching special effects technology. The animations were radio-controlled, making more realism.

The sets were created by Lia Renha, Maria Odile, Kátia Florêncio and Fernando Schmidt, and had different dimensions variating since miniature to the big ones.

All props were built specially for TV Colosso.

== Cartoons ==
Just below is the list of some series that were shown on TV Colosso:

- The Adventures of Mickey and Donald
- Adventures of Sonic the Hedgehog
- Alvin and the Chipmunks
- Animaniacs
- Back to the Future
- Biker Mice from Mars
- Captain Planet and the Planeteers
- Chip 'n Dale: Rescue Rangers
- Darkwing Duck
- Dinosaurs
- Dog City
- Dungeons & Dragons
- Eek! The Cat
- He-Man and the Masters of the Universe
- Here Comes the Grump
- Mighty Morphin Power Rangers
- Mr. Bogus
- Popeye
- Scooby-Doo
- Spider-Man
- Spiff and Hercules
- TaleSpin
- Taz-Mania
- Teenage Mutant Ninja Turtles
- The Smurfs
- The Super Mario Bros. Super Show!
- Tiny Toon Adventures
- VR Troopers
- Where's Wally?
- Widget
- Wish Kid
- X-Men

== TV Specials ==
=== TV Colosso Especial ===
This made-for-TV featurette film was aired on December 24, 1993, and retold traditional Christmas stories.

The story tells TV Colosso's gang celebrating Christmas at JF's house and watching special scheduling at a high-technology TV. Priscila, Capachildo Capachão, Thunder Dog and others watch "A Estrela de Belém, Cada Gilmar é um Rei" (loosely based on the "Three Wise Men" classic tale) and "O Avarento" (loosely based on "A Christmas Carol" by Charles Dickens).

The sets on this special were made by Lia Renha and Fernando Schmidt, the costumes were designed by Billy Accioly, and art was produced by Silvana Estrella.

=== TV Colosso Especial Terça Nobre ===
Due to celebration of Children's Day in 1994, an episode of TV Colosso was specially produced to be shown on Terça Nobre (primetime block), mixing for the first time puppets with live actors.

In this special, Priscila and the gang are producing and hosting the special show. The guest stars were the Rede Globo cast: Renato Aragão, Dedé Santana, Casseta & Planeta Team, Regina Casé, Tom Cavalcante, Xuxa, Sandy & Júnior, Claudio Heinrich, Ana Paula Tabalipa, André Marques and Carolina Dieckmann.

The special was taped at the original sets of TV Colosso and at Teatro Fenix, on Rio de Janeiro, where Fernando Schmidt turned the theater at TV Colosso's auditorium.

== Merchandising ==
The success of TV Colosso launched 2 records by Som Livre, a feature film, shows, a theatrical play, toys and games by Estrela and Sega, and comic books by Editora Abril.

== Super-Colosso - Uma Aventura de Cinema da TV Colosso ==
Due to major success of TV Colosso, a feature film was produced by Paris Filmes, Criadores e Criaturas, Ltda. and Play Video Produções Para TV & Cinema. The film was released in 1994 and the biggest sadness about it were its R$2,000,000 budget and that to date his producers didn't pay incentive taxes.

=== Plot ===
Priscila, Alice, Gilmar, Capachildo Capachão, JF, Nestor, Castilho, Malabi, Walter Gate, Waltinho, Borges, Bullborg, Bóris, Jaca Paladium, Paulo Paulada, and all staff of TV Colosso want to throw a party to celebrate the Dog's Day. They organize a game contest, and Gilmar chooses the Thinker Dog Statue, by renowned sculptor Cacheau Rodin, as a trophy. But Afrânio Furtado, Dona Jóia Furtado and his children Rubi and Furtadinho manage to steal it, trying to cut the fun short.

=== Cast ===
- Rafael Nomais: Marcelo Serrado
- Alice: Luana Piovani
- The Furtado Family: Antônio Carlos Falcão, Debora Olivieri, Jussara Marques, Fredy Allan
- Gabriela: Ilana Kaplan
- Flávio: Luciano Quirino
- The French Delegation: Bhá Bocchi Prince, Graziella Moretto, Luiz Miranda
- voice of Priscila: Mônica Rossi
- voices of Gilmar/Supercão, Malabi and Professor Cacá: Mário Jorge
- voice of Castilho: Marco Ribeiro
- voices of Capachão and Nestor: Mauro Ramos
- voices of JF, Thunderdog, and Daniel: Garcia Júnior
- voice of chicken song teacher: Carmen Sheila
- voices of Jaca Paladium, Paulo Paulada and Vira-Lata de Aço: Hamilton Ricardo
- voice of flea: Isis Koschdoski
- voices of Walter Gate, Sr. Bóris, Bullborg and flea: Márcio Simões
- voice of Waltinho: Reynaldo Buzzoni
- voice of Peggy Sunshine and flea: Sheila Dorfman
- additional voices: Marco Antônio, Hércules Fernando (uncredited), Carlos Seidl (uncredited)
- puppeteers: Airton Aranha, Álvaro Petersen (uncredited), Ana Andreata, Astrid Toledo, Cacá Sena, Érica Tucherman, Fernanda Silveira, Guilherme Pires, Henrique Serrano (uncredited), José Carnevale, Luciano Quirino, Luiz Cláudio Pacini, Magda Crudelli (uncredited), Marcelo Burkoff, Marcos Lima, Marcos Toledo (uncredited), Paulo Adriane (uncredited), Paulo Ferrer, Pi Heins, Quiá Rodrigues, Renato Spineli, Roberto Dornelles, Rodrigo Scarpa (uncredited), Zé Clayton

=== Crew ===
- director: Luiz Ferré
- puppet director: Roberto Dornelles
- voice director: Mário Jorge
- production director: Siomara Blumer
- production coordinators: Geno Riva, Socorro Goes
- executive producer: Guga de Oliveira
- music: Ruriá Duprat
- editor: Luiz Elias
- costume designer: Sylvia Moraes
- art director: Felipe Tassara
- director of photography: Christian Lesage
- script: Giba Assis Brasil, Laerte

== Crew ==
- created by: Luiz Ferré, Roberto Dornelles
- written by: Valério Campos, Toninho Neves, Laerte, Angeli, Glauco, Luiz Gê, Fernando Gonzalez, Newton Foot, Gilmar Rodrigues, Adão Iturrusgarai, Flávio Luiz, Nani, Ique, Chico Soares, Toni Marques, Antônio Costa Neto, Luiz Martins, José Rubens Chachá
- English adaptation: Kyle Logan, Michael Bruza, Juliana Gaspari
- puppeteering director: Roberto Dornelles
- directed by: J. B. de Oliveira (Boninho), Mário Meirelles, Roberto Vaz
- puppets - Criadores e Criaturas, Ltda.: Luiz Ferré, Roberto Dornelles, Zé Clayton, Jacyra Santos, Totoni Silva, Luiz Rogério, Fernanda Silveira, Sidney Beckencamp
- puppeteers: Quiá Rodrigues, Renato Spinelli, Cacá Sena, Érica Tucherman, Julice de Paula, Mário de Ballentti, Joana Correa, Jefferson Antônio, Milton Carvalho, Renato Coelho, Paulo Adriane, Henrique Serrano, Marcos Toledo, Magda Crudelli, Álvaro Petersen, Otávio Ferreira, Charlene Brito, Gabriel Bezerra, Rodolpho Brandão, Vandriani Lazarini, Airton Aranha, André Vagon, Cláudia Raduzewsky
- voices directed by: Mário Jorge
- American voice directors: Michael Bruza, Kyle Logan
- narrator: Sylvia Salustti
- with the voice talents of: Mário Jorge, Mônica Rossi, Ísis Kochdosky, Garcia Jr., Guilherme Briggs, Sheila Dorfman, Márcio Simões, Carmen Sheila, Hércules Fernando, Carlos Seidl, Marco Antônio, Hamilton Ricardo, Mauro Ramos, Marco Ribeiro, Reynaldo Buzzoni
- English voice cast: Dorothy Fahn, Sandy Fox, Nathan Turner, Brian Habicht, Kelly Jean Badgley
- puppet technicians: Daniel Segal, Sidnei Antonioli
- production coordinator: Jayme Henriques
- editing: Marco Siciliano, Robson M. Schneider, Rosemeire Barros
- production team: Mara Martins, Mário Viana, Sérgio Barata, Gilson de Souza, Carla Braga, José de Andrade
- sets designed by: Lia Renha, Maria Odile, Kátia Florêncio, Fernando Schmidt
- costumes designed by: Cao, Lúcia Cunha, Billy Accioly, Helena Araújo, Bia Rocha, Marília Carneiro
- art produced by: Silvana Estrella
- visual effects: Pojucan
- camera: Paulo Cesar Moreira, Maurício Soares, Afonso Enrique, Oswaldo Rogério, Lídio Carlos, Jorge Gaby
- sound designed by: Leonardo da Vinci
- music: Rodolfo Rebuzzi, Ricardo Ottoboni, Edson e Felipe, Fernando Figueiredo
- music directed by: Márcio Vip Antonucci
- cinematography: Manuel Neves
- main titles by: Hans Donner, Nilton Nunes, Ruth Reis, Capy Ramazzina
- director of photography: Luiz Paulo Nenem
- executive producer: Flávio Goldemberg
- production director: Marcelo Paranhos
- art directed by: Ana Blota, Maurício Sherman
- production: CENTRAL GLOBO DE PRODUÇÃO

== DVD ==
In October 2009, Som Livre and Globo Marcas released a DVD trilogy focusing the show's best episodes:

- Volume 1: A Princesa Pirata e As Aventuras do Supercão
- Volume 2: A Carrocinha do Amor e outras histórias
- Volume 3: Inimigos Para Sempre e a dupla Rodoválio e Gumercindo.

== See also ==
- The Muppet Movie
- The Great Muppet Caper
- The Muppets Take Manhattan
- Sesame Street Presents Follow That Bird
- Labyrinth
- Teenage Mutant Ninja Turtles
- Teenage Mutant Ninja Turtles II: The Secret of the Ooze
- The Muppet Christmas Carol
- Teenage Mutant Ninja Turtles III
- Muppet Treasure Island
- Muppets from Space
- The Adventures of Elmo in Grouchland
- The Country Bears
- The Muppets
- Muppets Most Wanted
