= Angeli (cartoonist) =

Brazilian cartoonist

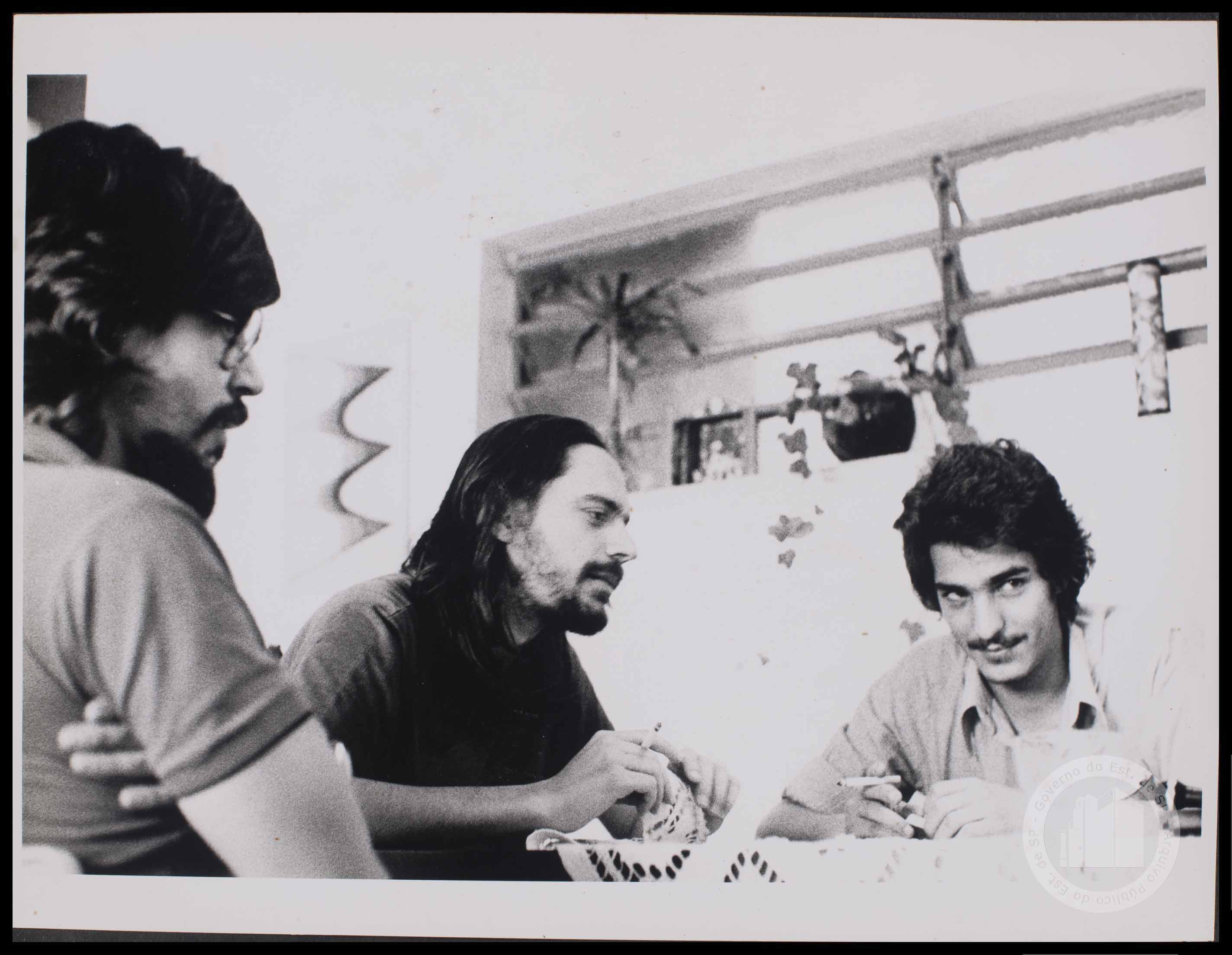
- Angeli (third from left), with Luiz Gê and Chico Caruso, c.1975-79
- Born: Arnaldo Angeli Filho; August 31, 1956 (age 69); São Paulo, Brazil
- Occupations: cartoonist, comic strip artist

Arnaldo Angeli Filho (born August 31, 1956, in São Paulo, Brazil), more commonly known as Angeli, is one of the best-known Brazilian cartoonists.

Angeli already had strips published in Germany, France, Italy, Spain, Argentina, and Portugal, where a compilation of his work was launched by Devir publishing company in 2000. Two animated feature films based on his work were released: the 2006 film Wood & Stock: Sexo, Orégano e Rock'n'Roll, directed by Otto Guerra, and the 2021 stop-motion film "Bob Spit: We Do Not Like People', directed by César Cabral.

He started at the age of 14 at magazine Senhor, as well as publishing material in independent fanzines. In 1973 he was hired by the newspaper Folha de S.Paulo, where he published daily strips until 2016. He contributed occasionally for Folha until 2022, when he retired from comics work after being diagnosed with aphasia.

At the beginning of the 80's, Angeli had developed a large universe of characters of an urban and anarchic nature, such as:

- Meia Oito e Nanico, an anachronic anti-authority rebel duo;
- Rê Bordosa, a junkie;
- Luke & Tantra, two teenage girls obsessed with losing their virginity;
- Wood & Stock; two old hippies who lost their brains sometime in the 1960s

In 1983 he released an adult comic book called "Chiclete com Banana". From 1993 to 1996 he was one of the writers for the children show TV Colosso.
