= List of Monica and Friends printed media =

This list follows all publications derived printed media of Monica and Friends franchise and relative works, created by Mauricio de Sousa. The comic books have been published by three publishers and are still in publication since 1970.

== Current ==
=== Comic books ===
Monica and Friends titles are usually published in digest size. The comics were published by 3 publishers: Abril (1970-1986), Globo (1987-2006) and Panini (2007-present). At Panini the comics were published in 3 series, the first series between 2007 and 2015, the second series between 2015 and 2021, and the third starting in 2021.

- Mônica (Monica)
  - Ed. Abril (1970–1986): 1-200
  - Ed. Globo (1987–2006): 1-246
  - Ed. Panini (2007–present): 1-100 (first series), 1-70 (second series), 1- (third series)
- Cebolinha (Jimmy Five)
  - Ed. Abril (1973–1986): 1-168
  - Ed. Globo (1987–2006): 1-246
  - Ed. Panini (2007–present): 1-100 (first series), 1-70 (second series), 1- (third series)
- Cascão (Smudge)
  - Ed. Abril (1982–1986): 1-114
  - Ed. Globo (1987–2006): 1-467
  - Ed. Panini (2007–present): 1-100 (first series), 1-70 (second series), 1- (third series)
- Chico Bento (Chuck Billy)
  - Ed. Abril (1982–1986): 1-114
  - Ed. Globo (1987–2006): 1-467
  - Ed. Panini (2007–present): 1-100 (first series), 1-70 (second series), 1- (third series)
- Magali (Maggy)
  - Ed. Globo (1989–2006): 1-403
  - Ed. Panini (2007–present): 1-100 (first series), 1-70 (second series), 1- (third series)
- Turma da Mônica (Monica and Friends)

In the early years it used to be a comic book focused on Parque da Mônica, however, over time it has been focusing more and more on stories unrelated to the park. After the original park was discontinued in 2010, the comic book became the main comic book of Monica and Friends with the stories being translated simultaneously into English and Spanish starting in second series in 2015.

  - Ed. Globo (1993–2006): 1-168 (as "Revista Parque da Mônica")
  - Ed. Panini (2007–present): 1-100 (first series, as "Turma da Mônica: Uma Aventura no Parque da Mônica" from 1-44, however it would still bearer the logo of "Parque da Mônica" up to number 84), 1-70 (second series), 1- (third series)
- Turma da Mônica Jovem (Monica Teen)
  - Ed. Panini (2008–present): 1-100 (first series), 1-52 (second series, starting in 2016), 1- (third series)

=== Almanacs ===
The "Almanaques da Turma da Mônica" (Monica and Friends Almanacs) bring republications of the best stories. At Panini the almanacs began to have their second series in 2021.

==== Bi-monthly publications ====
- Almanaque da Mônica (Monica's Almanac)
  - Ed. Abril (1976–1986): 1-31
  - Ed. Globo (1987–2006): 1-117
  - Ed. Panini (2007-): 1-85 (first series), 1- (second series)
- Almanaque do Cebolinha (Jimmy Five's Almanac)
  - Ed. Abril (1978–1986): 1-8
  - Ed. Globo (1987–2006): 1-96
  - Ed. Panini (2007-): 1-85 (first series), 1- (second series)
- Almanaque do Cascão (Smudge's Almanac)
  - Ed. Abril (1979–1986): 1-12
  - Ed. Globo (1987–2006): 1-96
  - Ed. Panini (2007-): 1-85 (first series), 1- (second series)
- Almanaque do Chico Bento (Chuck Billy's Almanac)
  - Ed. Abril (1979–1986): 1-8
  - Ed. Globo (1987–2006): 1-96
  - Ed. Panini (2007-): 1-85 (first series), 1- (second series)
- Almanaque da Magali (Maggy's Almanac)
  - Ed. Globo (1989–2006): 1-57
  - Ed. Panini (2007-): 1-85 (first series), 1- (second series)
- Almanaque da Turma da Mônica (Monica and Friends' Almanac)
  - Ed. Panini (2021-): 1-
- Almanaque Historinhas Sem Palavras (Wordless stories Almanac)

Featuring only mute stories without dialogue.

  - Ed. Panini (2009-2014; 2022-): 1-7 (first series), 1- (second series)
- Almanaque de Histórias Curtas Turma da Mônica (Monica and Friends' Short Stories Almanac)

Featuring only short stories between 1-3 pages.

  - Ed. Panini (2022-): 1-

==== Quarterly publications ====
- Almanaque Temático (Thematic Almanac)

With several stories featuring several different characters, but with the same theme, formerly named "Coleção Um Tema Só" (One Single Theme Collection)

  - Ed. Globo (1992–2006): 1-52 (as "Coleção Um Tema Só")
  - Ed. Panini (2007-): 1-
  - Ed. Panini (2018-): 1- (as "Coleção Um Tema Só", republishing two thematic Almanacs with hard cover)

==== Biannual publications ====
- Almanacão Turma da Mônica (Monica's Gang Big Almanac)

A big-sized Almanac. During the first years at Panini it was temporarily renamed as "Grande Almanaque Turma da Mônica" (Great Monica's Gang Almanac)

  - Ed. Globo (1994–2006): 1-24
  - Ed. Panini (2007-2017): 1-22 (as "Grande Almanaque Turma da Mônica")
  - Ed. Panini (2018-): 1-
- Almanaque Turma da Tina (Tina's Pals' Almanac)
  - Ed. Panini (2007-2020; 2022): 1-28 (first series), 1- (second series)

==== Annual publications ====
- Mônica Especial de Natal (Mônica’s Christmas Special)

Featuring Christmas-related stories only, former "Mônica Edição Especial de Natal" (Monica’s Special Christmas Edition)

  - Ed. Globo (1995–2006): 1-9
  - Ed. Panini (2007-): 1-

== Defunct publications ==
=== Comics ===
- Bidu (Blu)

Considered the first comic made by Mauricio de Sousa, even before the creation of Monica and having the debut of Jimmy Five as a sidekick for Franklin. The first 4 issues were published by Continental, which started to be called Outubro from the 5th issue.

  - Editora Continental/Outubro (1960-1961): 1-8
- Pelezinho
  - Editora Abril (1977–1982): 1-60
- Gibizinho da Mônica (Monica’s Little Comic Book)

A series of pocket-sized comic books, the first issues focused in different protagonists starring their own titles and covers using both Mauricio de Sousa characters and other characters licensed for Globo like El Chavo del Ocho, but it was later renamed as Gibizinho da Mônica in 1993 focusing only on Monica and Friends stories.

  - Editora Globo (1991–1998): 1-84
- Ronaldinho Gaúcho
  - Ed. Globo (2006): 1-3
  - Ed. Panini (2007-2015): 1-100
- Clássicos do Cinema Turma da Mônica (Monica's Gang Classics of the Cinema)

Parodies of movies, with republications of the Gibizão stories and sequels of them, as well as original stories ("Cascão Porker", an adaptation of the first Harry Potter film).

  - Ed. Panini (2007-2020): 1-70
- Neymar Jr.
  - Ed. Panini (2013-2015): 1-24 (first series), 3 (second series)
- Tina

The comic had two versions, the first featuring the characters as in the original and the second being a reboot with a completely different art style.

  - Ed. Panini (2009-2011): 1-30
  - Ed. Panini (2014-2015): 1-6
- Chico Bento Moço (Chuck Billy Young Man)
  - Ed. Panini (2013-2021): 1-75
- Turma da Mônica: Geração 12 (Monica's Gang: Generation 12)
  - Ed. Panini (2019-2020): 1-6
- As Melhores Piadas (The Best Jokes)
  - Editora Abril (1976–1978)(1986)
- Tiras Especial
  - Editora Abril (1974–1975)
- Almanaque do Gibizinho (Little Comic’s Almanac)
  - Editora Globo (1997–2001): 1-46; 2ª série: (2003–2006): 1-40

=== Almanacs ===
- Almanaque do Pelezinho (Pelezinho’s Almanac)
  - Editora Abril (1977–1986)
- Almanacão de Férias (Holidays' Big Almanac)

Bi-monthly publication released during Brazil school holidays. During the first years at Panini it was renamed as "Grande Almanaque de Férias" (Great Holidays Almanac), but later it was renamed as "Almanacão de Férias da Turma da Mônica" ((Monica and Friends' Holidays' Big Almanac)). The title was discontinued in Panini's third series.

  - Ed. Globo (1987–2006): 1-42
  - Ed. Panini (2007-2016): 1-20 (as "Grande Almanaque de Férias")
  - Ed. Panini (2018-2020): 1-6 (as "Almanacão de Férias da Turma da Mônica")
- Almanaque Historinhas de Uma Página (Single-page stories Almanac)

Featuring only stories that occupies only one page at a comic book, former "Coleção Uma Página, Uma História".

  - Ed. Globo (2006): 1-3 (as "Coleção Uma Página, Uma História")
  - Ed. Panini (2007-2014): 1-9
- Almanaque Historinhas de Duas Página (Two-page stories Almanac)

Featuring only stories that occupies two pages at a comic book.

  - Ed. Panini (2007-2014): 1-9
- Almanaque Historinhas de Três Página (Three-page stories Almanac)

Featuring only stories that occupies three pages at a comic book.

  - Ed. Panini (2008-2014): 1-9
- Almanaque Turma do Penadinho (Bug-a-Booo's Almanac)
  - Ed. Panini (2007-2020): 1-28
- Almanaque Turma do Astronauta (The Funnies' Almanac)
  - Ed. Panini (2007-2013): 1-14
- Almanaque Bidu & Mingau (Blu & Vanilla's Almanac)

The almanac went on a hiatus for 6 years, returning in 2020 replacing the Almanaque do Louco for 2 more issues.

  - Ed. Panini (2007-2014; 2020): 1-14
- Almanaque Piteco & Horácio (Pitheco & Horacio's Almanac)
  - Ed. Panini (2009-2014): 1-11
- Almanaque Papa-Capim & Turma da Mata (Tom-Tom & Lionel's Kingdom's Almanac)
  - Ed. Panini (2010-2014): 1-9
- Almanaque do Louco (Nutty Ned's Almanac)
  - Ed. Panini (2011-2019): 1-18

==== Gibizão ====
This huge-sized comic book (even bigger than the Almanacão) by Editora Globo had only nine editions.

- Batmenino Eternamente (Batboy Forever)- parody of Batman Forever, with Jimmy Five as Batman, Smudge as Robin, Bucky as Alfred and Monica playing Dr. Chase Meridian. The villains are "Frankler" (Franklin as Riddler) and "Nimbus Nope" (a version of Two-Face where Nimbus and Nick Nope are fused together).
- Horacic Park - parody of Jurassic Park. The sequels were later spoofed in the "Clássicos do Cinema": O Imundo Perdido: Horacic Park (The Lost World: Jurassic Park; the title is a pun turning mundo, "world", into Imundo, "dirty") and Horacic Park III (Jurassic Park III).
- Os Doze Trabalhos da Mônica (The Twelve Labors of Monica) – Parody of the Labors of Hercules, slightly modified (for example, the Erymanthian Boar becomes Thunder).
- Romeu e Julieta (Romeo & Juliet) – adaptation of a movie of the gang. It transforms the William Shakespeare's story, providing a less tragic end to "Romeo Montague Five" and "Juliet Monicapulet".
- Comandante Gancho (Captain Hook) – parody of Hook.
- Mônica e os Bárbaros (Monica and the Barbarians) - republication. Monica travels on a time machine created by Franklin and helps a warrior on a fictional Hyborian Age land, with elements of Conan the Barbarian.
- Superparque (Superpark) – Some superheroes are on vacation and go to the Parque da Mônica.
- Coelhada nas Estrelas (Star Warp) - parody of Star Wars Episode IV: A New Hope. The rest of the original Star Wars trilogy was spoofed in the "Clássicos do Cinema" line, with the sequels O Feio Contra Ataca ("The Ugly Strikes Back", parody of The Empire Strikes Back) and O Retorno de Jedito ("Return of the Jedito", parody of Return of the Jedi).
- A Volta ao mundo em 80 Garfadas (Around the World in Eighty Meals) – Parody of Around the World in Eighty Days.

== See also ==
- Graphic MSP
