= Gibizinho =

Comic book

- Cover of the first issue released in 1993 as Gibizinho da Mônica

Publication information
- Publisher: Editora Globo
- Format: Ongoing series
- Genre: Humor/comedy
- Publication date: 1991–1998
- No. of issues: 164

Creative team
- Created by: Mauricio de Sousa

Gibizinho (lit. Little Comic Book) was a title of a comic book created by Editora Globo that was published between 1991 and 1998, at first as a weekly magazine that often varied the character in each issue between characters by Mauricio de Sousa and other licensed characters who had comics published by Globo like the Mexican characters El Chavo del Ocho and El Chapulín Colorado or celebrities like Xuxa and Leandro & Leonardo. Starting in 1993, the title of the comic became monthly and started to focus only on Monica and Friends being renamed as Gibizinho da Mônica. The comic books were characterized by their pocket format in a small size of between 13.5 x 9.5 cm and short stories.

The series was discontinued in 1998, but in the same year republications in the form of almanacs (excluding the early comics unrelated to Monica and Friends) were started, lasting until 2006.

== Inspirations ==
Previously, between December 1984 and January 1985, 6 mini-magazines were sold as gifts together with Monica and Friends' comics sold by Editora Abril, each one featuring a different character. Later, in 1988, other small comics were given away in partnership with Danone products, which also sold a few Os Trapalhões mini comics in the same year.

== Titles ==
Characters that had their own titles in the early issues between 1991 and 1992.

- Monica - 8 issues (before 1993)
- Blu - 4 issues
- Angel - 3 issues
- Pitheco - 2 issues
- Jimmy Five - 5 issues
- Lionel's Kingdom - 2 issues
- Bubbly the Astronaut - 3 issues
- Tina - 4 issues
- Smudge - 6 issues
- Maggy - 6 issues
- Tom-Tom - 2 issues
- Curly - 4 issues
- Chuck Billy - 6 issues
- Horacio - 3 issues
- Franklin - 2 issues
- Bug-a-Booo - 3 issues
- Sergio Mallandro - 1 issue
- Leandro & Leonardo - 9 issues
- Turma do Arrepio - 9 issues
- Xuxa - 7 issues
- El Chavo del Ocho - 4 issues
- El Chapulín Colorado - 5 issues
- Paquitas - 1 issue
- Pelezinho - 2 issues
- Vanilla - 1 issue
- Puff - 1 issue
