= The Funnies (Monica and Friends) =

Mauricio de Sousa's creation related to Monica's Gang

"Bubbly the Astronaut" ("O Astronauta" in original Portuguese)
- Bubbly, the main character of the comic.
- Author: Mauricio de Sousa
- Current status/schedule: Running.
- Launch date: 1963
- Genre(s): Humor comics, Adventure comics

The Funnies ("O Astronauta"), also known as Bubbly the Astronaut, is a Brazilian comic strip series, created in 1963 and part of the Monica's Gang comic strips. It centers around Bubbly, an astronaut, whose parents and ex-girlfriend Rita appear very rarely, making him the only recurring character. The comic strip can be defined as a science fiction adventure strip.

In order to draw the outer space scenarios that normally serve as background for the strips, inkers for The Funnies normally use fountain and dip pens, with white, gray and black as colors. Sérgio Graciano (1936–2019), one of the inkers, says he reads scientific publications so his work is as loyal to real space as possible.

== Characters ==
- Bubbly (Astronauta, Astronauta Pereira Assunção) – Bubbly is the main and virtually only character of The Funnies. He is an astronaut and works for the fictional BRASA (Brasileiros Astronautas – Brazilian Astronauts, a pun on the acronym of the National Aeronautics and Space Administration). His space ship and home is an orange metallic ball. Basically, he spends his time traveling through the Universe, visiting new planets and contacting extraterrestrials (or eventually fighting them). His missions usually involve fighting intergalactic criminals or collecting information about new planets. His English name was given after his round-like space suit.
- Computer (Computador) – The board computer of Bubbly's space ship. He is able to talk, and his monitor features a face when not displaying anything. The computer gives Bubbly information about any planet, zone, or galaxy ahead of the ship, and also makes him company by playing games (most frequently videogames or chess) or striking conversations in order to fend off Bubbly's lonely feelings.
- Rita or Izabel (Ritinha) – Bubbly's lover. She was his girlfriend once, but as Bubbly spent years in space without coming back, Rita left him and married another guy, which made Bubbly deeply depressed.
- Bonifácio – Rita's husband.
- Lorena and Astrogildo – Bubbly's parents who are farmers. They always appear in stories in which Bubbly returns to his home on Earth.
- Ditão – The Bubbly's best friend who lives next to the Bubbly's parents' house.

Villains

- Barba Laser (Laser Beard) – Bubbly's occasional antagonist, he acts as a space pirate and is often seen with his not so intelligent helper Matraca (whose name may be translated as Ratchet).
- Bronk's Gang – They are a gang of three alien criminals who make a few appearances in the stories. The leader Bronk constantly bullies Bubbly because his round space suit kicking him like a soccer ball.
- Cabeleira Negra (Blackhair) – A beautiful woman who is the leader of a group of space pirates and is considered the futuristic descendant of the pirate Blackbeard. She had her first appearance in the film Uma Aventura no Tempo as one of the main villains of the plot and also living in the future, in the film is revealed that she is bald and wears a wig, plus Bubbly demonstrate a platonic love for her. In the comics she had a few appearances on Monica Teen, however living on the present day different from the movie.

== Other versions ==
In 2009, the character had seven stories from the first graphic novel from the trilogy Mauricio de Sousa por 50 artistas, idealized by editor Sey Gusman, in honor of Maurício de Sousa's 50 years career, in the first album, MSP 50, there is a story by Marcelo Campos and Renato Guedes. Jean Okada, creates a story of the Astronaut's first flight and for that he made a more credible version of the hero's space suit, in another film by comic artist Flávio Luiz, the character takes a trip through time and finds the prehistoric Piteco.

In 2010, was released the second book, MSP + 50. In this book, one of the Astronaut stories was written by Gian Danton and illustrated by JJ Marreiro and another written by Wellington Srbek and art by Will.

For the Astronaut character design, Marreiro was inspired by comics artists such as Curt Swan (known for his work on Superman) and Alex Toth (known for his work on animation series such as Space Ghost for Hanna-Barbera). Danton and Marreiro were also inspired by sci-fi franchises like Perry Rhodan, Star Trek, Flash Gordon and the comic books Planet Comics and Strange Worlds, among others. Gian Danton has worked with both artists, with Jean Okada he made the space opera webcomic Exploradores do Desconhecido and scripted a story of the Mulher-Estupenda, a superheroine created by JJ Marreiro in honor of the Golden Age of Comics, still in 2010, Marreiro illustrated Amanhã é Ontem, a novella of Exploradores do Desconhecido.

In 2011, the last book MSP Novos 50 was released, in that album Astronauta stars in 5 stories and participates in others as a supporting, one of these stories was written and designed by Aluir Amancio, Aluir started his career at the twelve years drawing the strips of Turma da Mônica for the newspaper Folha de S.Paulo. Aluir also drew Superman stories, based on the Superman: The Animated Series, where he had to follow the style established by Bruce Timm. Another story contained in the book was produced by the cartoonist from Paraíba, Shiko, who resides in Italy.

In 2012, Bubbly starred a graphic novel called Astronauta - Magnetar (as a part of the Graphic MSP), written and drawn by Danilo Beyruth with colors by Cris Peter. Beyurth was inspired by science fiction films like Alien and 2001: A Space Odyssey, in addition, did research on astrophysics and navigation. The graphic novel had a continuation in Astronauta - Singularidade (2014), Astronauta - Assimetria (2016), Astronauta - Entropia (2018), Astronauta - Parallax (2020) and Astronauta: Convergência (2022). The graphic novels Magnetar, Singularidade and Assimetria were collected in a trade paperback, the book contains an unpublished story for the editionː Silêncio Lunar with colors by Mariane Gusmão, totaling 272 pages.

In the comic book Tina, launched in September 2014, Astronaut is the superhero of Astronauta Comics, read by Steve.

=== Monica Teen ===
In Monica Teen, Bubbly appears for the first time in issue 3 meeting with Monica and her friends in the dimension Tobor. From issue 6 onwards it is revealed that he is now with the rank of commander of the Cruzador Espacial Hoshi (Space Cruiser Hoshi), along with the faithful computer friend counts on the collaboration of Lieutenant Crystal and Ensign Specs. Unlike the original, Bubbly has a more realistic and mature appearance using a normal space suit different from his classic round outfit.

== Other media ==
In 1965, Bubbly had a picture book called Astronauta no Planeta dos Homens Sorvetes by Maurício de Sousa (script and drawings), Paulo Hamasaki (inks) and Joel Link and Alberto Dijinshian (colors), published by publisher FTD, which was part of a series of books inspired by the Mauricio de Sousa's characters. In 1971, a song to Bubbly was composed for the album A Bandinha da Turma da Mônica.

Bubbly also has made some rare animated appearances of Monica's Gang TV commercials and cartoons since the 1960s, usually in cameos. In 1998 a single animated episode based in the comics was released by VHS in the Monica's Gang film O Estranho Soro do Dr. X. Bubbly is also featured in the Monica's Gang's 2007 animated film Uma Aventura no Tempo. After that, Bubbly has cameo appearances in episodes such as "Os Cinco Fios Mágicos", "O Corpo Fala" and "O Dia em que Derrotei a Mônica".

Bubbly is also playable character in the 2018 game Mônica e a Guarda dos Coelhos.

In 2018 an animation series based on the graphic novel series of the character was announced for HBO Brasil. The series premiered on October 18, 2024 on HBO and Max.
