= Graphic MSP =

Graphic novel series

- Country: Brazil
- Language: Portuguese
- Genre: Graphic novel
- Publisher: Panini Comics
- Published: October 2012 - May 2018
- No. of books: 16

Graphic MSP is a series of graphic novels published by Panini Comics based on the characters of Monica and Friends.

== Development ==
In November 2011, during the Festival Internacional de Quadrinhos held in Belo Horizonte, Sidney Gusman, editor of Mauricio de Sousa Produções (Monica and Friends studio) announced that in 2012, it would be released the Graphic MSP, a series of graphic novels, that unlike the MSP 50 series, it would bring unique stories in about 72 pages each. The comic artist Danilo Beyruth was chosen to create a story for the Bubbly, in 2009, Beyruth had already written and drawn characters of Mauricio de Sousa for the MSP+50 album and produced a story for Bug-a-Booo. In October 2012, is released the first graphic novel of the series, entitled Astronauta - Magnetar, with script and drawings by Beyruth and colors by Cris Peter.

== Publications ==
Title	Character(s)	Writer	Release date
Astronauta - Magnetar	The Funnies	Danilo Beyruth	October, 2012
Turma da Mônica - Laços	Monica and Friends	Vitor Cafaggi and Lu Cafaggi	June, 2013
Chico Bento - Pavor Espaciar	Chuck Billy 'n' Folks	Gustavo Duarte	August, 2013
Piteco - Ingá	The Cavern Clan	Shiko	November, 2013
Bidu - Caminhos	Blu	Eduardo Damasceno and Luis Felipe Garrocho	August, 2014
Astronauta - Singularidade	The Funnies	Danilo Beyruth	December, 2014
Penadinho - Vida	Bug-a-Booo	Paulo Crumbim and Cristina Eiko	May, 2015
Turma da Mônica - Lições	Monica and Friends	Vitor Cafaggi and Lu Cafaggi	August, 2015
Turma da Mata - Muralha	Lionel's Kingdom	Roger Cruz, Davi Calil and Artur Fujita	September, 2015
Louco - Fuga	Nutty Ned	Rogério Coelho	December, 2015
Papa-Capim - Noite Branca	The Tribe	Marcela Godoy and Renato Guedes	April, 2016
Mônica - Força	Monica (Monica and Friends)	Bianca Pinheiro	September, 2016
Bidu - Juntos	Blu	Eduardo Damasceno and Luis Felipe Garrocho	November, 2016
Astronauta - Assimetria	The Funnies	Danilo Beyruth	December, 2016
Chico Bento - Arvorada	Chuck Billy 'n' Folks	Orlandeli	April, 2017
Jeremias - Pele	Jeremias	Rafael Calça and Jefferson Costa	May, 2018
