= Monica's Gang in an Adventure in Time =

2007 film directed by Maurício de Sousa

- Portuguese: Turma da Mônica em uma Aventura no Tempo
- Directed by: Maurício de Sousa
- Co-directed by: Rodrigo Gava; André Passos; Clewerson Saremba
- Screenplay by: Emerson Bernardo de Abreu; Flávio de Souza; Didi Oliveira; Maurício de Sousa
- Story by: Airon Barreto de Lacerda; Manoel Barreto de Lacerda; Elisabeth Mendes
- Based on: Monica's Gang by Maurício de Sousa
- Produced by: Diler Trindade
- Starring: Marli Bortoletto; Angélica Santos; Paulo Camargo; Elza Gonçalves; Sibele Toledo; Bianca Rinaldi; Maurício de Sousa
- Edited by: João Paulo Carvalho; Rafael Gomes
- Music by: Márcio Araújo; Danilo Adriano
- Production companies: Mauricio de Sousa Produções; Diler & Associados; Labocine Digital; Miravista
- Distributed by: Buena Vista International
- Release date: 16 February 2007
- Running time: 80 minutes
- Country: Brazil
- Language: Portuguese
- Box office: $2,186,657

Monica's Gang in an Adventure in Time (Portuguese: Turma da Mônica em Uma Aventura no Tempo) is a 2007 Brazilian animated film based on the Monica's Gang comic books. The film was directed and co-written by Mauricio de Sousa, creator of over two hundred characters featured in the comic books. It is the only installment in the franchise to be released by Disney via Buena Vista International.

The film received positive reviews, with praise for the script, soundtrack and character writing.

== Plot ==
Monica's Gang in an Adventure in Time begins with Franklin finishing up his time travel machine. He explains to his dog Blu that it works with the synthesis of the four elements. Meanwhile, on the other side of the street, Monica and Maggy are packing a picnic that they have planned with Jimmy Five and Smudge, who turns out to be creating an "infallible plan" to steal Monica's blue toy rabbit, Samson. The plan eventually fails when Monica discovers it. Jimmy Five and Smudge hide in Franklin's office. Monica and Maggy follow them there, where Monica accidentally throws her rabbit on Franklin's machine, causing the elements to travel to different periods in time. Franklin sends each child into a different time after the elements in order to bring them back. If they fail, time will slow down and eventually stop. Monica and Blu are sent to Prehistoric times to recover the element of fire, while Jimmy Five is sent to the 30th century to recover the element of air. Maggy is sent to a few years back (when the four main characters were babies) to recover the element of earth and Smudge is sent to an indigenous tribe in Colonial-era Brazil to recover water.

The people they meet are all characters of other related works of the original Monica's Gang comics (who are also well known to the Brazilian audiences), with exception of the villains Bandeirante, who is a greedy Portuguese man in search for gold named after the explorers of Colonial Brazil, and Cabeleira Negra (literal translation: black haired), who is a descendant from Black Beard and space pirate from the 30th century.

== Cast ==
- Marli Bortoletto as Monica
- Angélica Santos as Jimmy Five
- Paulo Cavalcante as Smudge
- Elza Gonçalves as Maggy
- Sibele Toledo as Franklin
- Bianca Rinaldi as Cabeleira Negra
- Maurício de Sousa as Blu and Monica's Dad
