= Tina's Pals =

Brazilian comic series

- The main characters in their current design.

Publication information
- Publisher: Editora Abril, Editora Globo, Panini Comics
- Schedule: monthly
- Format: Ongoing
- Main character(s): Tina; Curly (Rolo); Puff (Pipa); Steve (Zecão); Flip (Toneco)

Tina's Pals (Turma da Tina) is a Brazilian comic strip series, part of the Monica's Gang series, created in 1970. The stories are aimed at a more teenage group of readers, rather than the kids who would read other Mauricio de Sousa's works and thus center around teenagers and young adults. However, Mauricio prefers not to mention drugs, topics about sexuality, or other similar subjects, which are very popular among teenagers. Instead, the strips are written with themes related to school or university, dating, problems with parents, etc.

Originally the stories recounted the life of Tina and her family living in Salvador, Flip (Toneco) was the original protagonist. The stories changed when Tina joined the hippie culture and started to act alongside Curly (Rolo). In the late of 1970s, Mauricio left the hippie style and started to work with a less particular way of life for them, making the characters become more modern and changing their personalities over the years.

== Publication history ==
During the year of 1970, in the same year as the debut of Monica's first comic book series Mauricio de Sousa decided to create a bunch of new characters for the children's supplement of the newspaper Folha de S. Paulo, Folhinha. Among the characters were the siblings Flip, Toim, Tina and their grandmother Granny who were a family that initially lived in Salvador, Bahia. Flip was often portrayed as the main character in a similar way to Jimmy Five and in the same year he debuted he starred in a story in the Monica comic book debuting at the 6th issue. However, her older sister Tina ended up becoming more popular by starring in stories focused on hippie culture, gradually becoming the main protagonist. Later in 1972 the characters Curly (which was also another hippie character) and Puff were introduced reinforcing the stories focused on Tina which ended up with all the other unrelated characters, including Flip, disappearing in a few years.

At the end of the '70s the comics had gigantic changes in the art style and personalities of the characters: Tina and her friends become teenagers and have abandoned the hippie culture, Tina started to be drawn with more realistic and feminine features, and after the 80's appeared new characters like Puff's boyfriend: Steve (who eventually became a main character after a few years) and several other one-time characters. Since the '80s the comics have become one of the most popular franchises created by Mauricio de Sousa, continuing to have more modern stories and solding special titles and miniseries over the years.

== Characters ==
=== Main characters ===
- Tina (Cristina Costa Santana)– A young girl whose real name is Cristina. At first she was raised as a hippie child, being Flip's older sister and her supporting character, but in a short time she became popular, becoming the protagonist and starting to interact more with her friends Curly and Puff than with her family. At first the character had a more cartoonish look with large, thick glasses, but by the end of the 70s the character became older and had a more realistic appearance, starting to wear smaller glasses and abandoning the hippie trend. In the most recent stories she appears as a young adult who attends college. Since the 80s Tina is portrayed as a girl who is interested in fashion, music and beauty. She usually tends to be the most serious and voice of reason among her friends. Sometimes she is seen starring in stories dating several boys and similar to her friend Curly she is not very lucky in her romantic relationships, frequently changing boyfriends. In older stories she is seen dating Jaime, however this character is rarely seen appearing in current stories.
- Curly (Rolo Rodolfo Miguel Santos da Silva) – Tina's old childhood friend and one of the main protagonists. He was originally introduced as a hippie friend to Tina serving as her main sidekick character during the 70s at first having a calm and easy-going personality, having been created based on Mauricio's older brother, Márcio, who had a hippie phase during his youth. As the hippie fashion faded away, the character changed his personality over time. Since the 80s he has been portrayed as a clumsy young man who enjoys music, dating and riding a motorcycle. He often stars in stories trying to flirt with different girls, but his romantic relationships often go wrong and he never manages to maintain a steady relationship. Sometimes he is portrayed as having a great interest for rock and aspiring to an electric and acoustic guitar, sometimes even appearing to practice in a band with his friends.
- Puff (Pipa Priscila Pinheiro) – Tina's best friend. A young, overweight, sensitive, temperamental and sometimes immature girl who is best known for dating Steve. Puff was initially introduced in the 70s as a friend for Tina who, unlike her, did not follow the hippie fashion and was single. Initially portrayed as a serious character and later becoming clumsy like Curly, since the 80s she has been seen starring in stories about her loving relationship with her boyfriend Steve having their couple problems, but always understanding each other in the end, often asking for help and advice from Tina.
- Steve (Zecão) – Puff's boyfriend. Unlike his girlfriend, he is portrayed as a easy-going character who doesn't take the relationship seriously and often likes to relax and make jokes, which usually annoys Puff, however, Steve still proves to be a very faithful boyfriend to Puff who understands her despite their differences. In many stories he is also portrayed as a friend to Curly sharing many interests with him. The character was introduced in the early 80s, but became popular enough to be considered one of the main protagonists.

=== Recurring ===
- Flip (Toneco) – Tina's little brother. In the first stories was a 6-year-old kid, but recently he appears as a pre-teen whose exact age is unknown. He complains that Tina doesn't allow him to hang out with his friends or girls, since she thinks that he's not old and mature enough. This distinction causes them to have a common sibling rivalry, in which, in most of his appearances, they're usually arguing. He rarely appears in the comics, although he had originally been the main protagonist in the first stories.
- Granny (Vovoca) – Tina's grandmother. With a calm and loving personality, she's always seen to have a good relationship with her granddaughter, in which she's always helping and giving her advice for dealing life issues.
- Tina's Dad – A very nervous and busy father. Always he is punishing his daughter for her actions, and often shows jealous about the guys that Tina dating. In the early stories was a widowed man, but his wife had recently revealed.
- Tina's Mom - She is a bit like her daughter, she is often at home and like Granny, she tends to help Tina with some advice. It was introduced in the 2000s.
- Curly's Parents - They were introduced in the late 90's. Curly is seen living with them, having a good relationship with them. The father has similarities with the son, while the mother is shown to be very kind to Curly.
- Toim - Tina and Flip's younger brother. He is characterized by being a pessimistic boy who often cries easily. He is usually seen as a supporting character for Flip. He only appeared in older comics and was removed around 1973. However, in a more recent comic he had an appearance in one of the stories as a friend of Flip.
- Palestrino – Tina's family pet parrot. He was introduced in 1970 in a story starring Flip where he ends up being mistakenly bought by Flip. He is described as a mischievous foul-mouthed parrot sometimes arrogant and troublesome. For a while he became popular enough to star in his own strips in Folha de S. Paulo, however the character was discontinued in 1973. In current comics he has rare appearances, most of the time being remembered in crossovers with the other forgotten old characters of Mauricio de Sousa, and rarely is he seen being associated with Tina and her family. His name is a tribute to the old football team Palestra Itália, currently known as Palmeiras.
- Gargarejo and Porcãozinho - A pair of dogs that were recurring in early strips. Gargarejo was Tina's family pet dog, often characterized by his mania for howling, while Porcãozinho was Gargarejo's best friend and sidekick. Like Palestrino, they were introduced in 1970 for the children's supplement of the newspaper Folha de S. Paulo, having been discontinued in 1973.
- João Pedro and Luiza - A pair of siblings with no relation to Tina's family. João Pedro is a baby while Luiza is his older sister. Like Palestrino, Gargarejo and Porcãozinho, they were introduced in 1970 for the children's supplement of the newspaper Folha de S. Paulo, having been discontinued in 1973.
- Jaime – He was the Tina's first boyfriend. He first appeared in the early of 80s, but after a few stories the romance between the two characters was over. Since then he went on to appear as one of several recurring ex-boyfriends Tina in stories. He owns a motorcycle.
- Rúbia – Tina's rival, which first appeared in the miniseries "Tina e os Caçadores de Enigmas". Blonde, rich and envious, she has a personality similar to Carmem from Monica's Gang. She is constantly seen with Jaime, but as Tina the dating of the two was broken with the time.
- Baixinho (literally "Shorty") – Curly's best friend. As the name suggests (Baixinho is a slang for a short person), Baixinho is not a tall guy, at all. Although it is Curly who have to save him from the troubles he get himself involved to, he is frequently giving advice for Curly, specially when he is doing one of his many attempts to date a girl.
- Valentina and Valéria – A pair of twin sisters, very similar. They were based on Mauricio de Sousa's daughters.

== Media ==
Cover to the first issue of Tina e os Caçadores de Enigmas

In 1971 a song to Tina (based on her hippie version) was composed for the album "A Bandinha da Turma da Mônica", in 1987 another song for Tina was composed for the album "Turma da Mônica", entitled Tina Torna Tudo Legal (lit. Tina Makes It All Cool).

In 1979 there were plans for a live-action series starring the characters made in partnership with TV Cultura, and having as actors Beth Caruso as Tina, Vick Militello as Puff, and Kadu Moliterno as Curly, however the project was canceled before there was any filming.

The series had some special comic books (as part of the series Gibizinho) in the '90s by Editora Globo, four starring Tina, four starring Curly and one starring Puff.

In 2007 was published by Panini Comics a science-fiction miniseries starring Tina and her friends entitled "Tina e os Caçadores de Enigmas" (lit. Tina and the Enigma Hunters). The miniseries lasted with 3 issues, and subsequently had two sequels in 2008, in the same year was published a special comic entitled "Tina Especial". In May 2009 the series received its own comic book series entitled Tina, which ran until October 2011 with a total of 30 issues. After the cancellation, in 2014 was released a new version of the comic book featuring a new art style and new characters, but the changes have received a negative reception that resulted in the cancellation in 2015. The series also has an almanac with classic stories, the first series was published between 2004 and 2006 by Globo, currently the almanacs are published by Panini Comics since 2007.

Curly also makes a cameo in the Monica's Gang's 2007 animated film: Uma Aventura no Tempo.

In 2019 a graphical novel produced by Fefê Torquato based on Tina titled: Tina - Respeito, was released as part of the Graphic MSP.
