= Carne, Osso =

2011 film directed by Caio Cavechini, Carlos Juliano Barros

- Directed by: Caio Cavechini and Carlos Juliano Barros
- Written by: Caio Cavechini
- Cinematography: Lucas Barreto
- Production company: Repórter Brasil
- Release date: April 2, 2011
- Running time: 65 minutes
- Country: Brazil
- Language: Portuguese

Carne, Osso is a 2011 Brazilian documentary film directed by Caio Cavechini and Carlos Juliano Barros.

Produced by the NGO Repórter Brasil, the film portrays the reality of workers from Brazilian meat packing plants. It has already been broadcast at the É Tudo Verdade international festival.

== Synopsis ==
Meat packing workers tell the harsh reality of their routine in the livestock industry. Amid long shifts and a lot of non-compliance with labor laws, the group reveals how the meat production chain works: absurd records for boning and techniques as degrading as painful to improve performance are just a few details of the risk involved in the running machine.

== Reception ==
The journalist Luiz Carlos Merten, from Estadão, says: "Those 70-something cuts to 45 seconds of film had as much impact on audiovisual as Odessa's famous staircase scene in the classic ‘Battleship Potemkin’, by Sergei M. Eisenstein". He defines the program as "not so nice to see, but brave for the questions it raises".

In March 2011, the Metrópolis program conducted an interview with the film's directors. The following month, Época magazine conducted an interview with Carlos Juliano Barros, one of the film's directors.

Rodrigo Levino, from Veja magazine, says the documentary escapes lending to the vegetarian lobby, being worrying and moving, but the directors fail due to inexperience and excessive partisanship, due to the choice and repetition of some images and the greater focus on RS and MS, in addition to not identifying debtor companies.

According to journalist João Peres, from Rede Brasil Atual, "Carne, osso sounds like a Modern Times of the reality of slaughterhouses, Using irony and sarcasm to denounce the bad conditions of factory work in the early 20th century".

== Awards ==
- Honorable mention (EU -- OSHA) "DOK Leipzig" 2011 — Germany
- Official Selection "FIDOCS" 2011 — Chile
- Best Documentary (Júri Popular do DocFAM) "Florianópolis Audiovisual Mercosul" 2011 — Brazil
- Official Selection "É Tudo Verdade" 2011 — Brazil
- Official Selection "Festival de Gramado" 2011 — Brazil
