= Paulo Hamasaki =

Brazilian comics creator

- Born: September 29, 1941 Araçatuba, Brazil
- Died: December 10, 2015 (aged 74)
- Areas: Cartoonist, Editor
- Notable works: Venus, a ninfa espacial
- Awards: Prêmio Angelo Agostini for Master of National Comics

Paulo Hamasaki (Araçatuba, September 29, 1941 – December 10, 2015) was a Brazilian illustrator and comics artist. He started his career in the 1960s, when he also created his best-known character: Venus, a ninfa espacial ("Venus, the space nymph). He was the first art director at Estúdios Mauricio de Sousa, after helping Sousa in the design of a new children's supplement for the Folha de S.Paulo newspaper. In 1971, Hamasaki worked in the women's magazine Contigo, published by Abril publishers, publishing the adventures of Cris A Repórter. In the 1980s, he worked at Grafipar publishing house and later became an independent editor. In 1996, he was awarded with the Prêmio Angelo Agostini for Master of National Comics, an award that aims to honor artists who have dedicated themselves to Brazilian comics for at least 25 years.
