= Dudão =

Brazilian children's comic book series

- Cover of the first issue of Dudão, art by Jairo Alves da Silva

Publication information
- Publisher: Editora Louvor (1992); Editora Vida (1994–1997); Independent (1997, 2006)
- Format: Ongoing series
- Genre: Humor/comedy
- Publication date: 1992–1997
- No. of issues: 18 (+1 published in 2006)

Creative team
- Written by: Eduardo Samuel da Silva
- Artist: Jairo Alves da Silva
- Editor: Nilson Dantas

Dudão is a Brazilian children's comic book series created by former evangelical pastor Eduardo Samuel da Silva in cooperation with his brother the artist Jairo Alves da Silva in 1992. The comic with an educational and religious focus was created with the aim of evangelizing children and showing positive messages. The comic book had its first 5 issues published by Louvor in 1992, returning in 1994 by the publisher Vida, where in addition to having the first issues republished, it also had new issues being sold until 1997. During the years of publication the comic derived several other media products, including an LP album sung by Aline Barros (in her early career) released in the same year that the comic debuted.

== Synopsis ==
The story behind the Dudão comics is set in a Brazilian neighborhood in Rio de Janeiro, focusing on a group of children. The main character, Dudão, is an obese and hyper-religious boy who is often accompanied by his best friends Binho and Rebeca and his not-so-friends Paçoca, Zuca, Pita and Tato. Most of the stories revolve around educational and everyday themes, usually with Dudão trying to reprimand his friends and helping them learn from their mistakes with themes of civility and Christian values.

== Characters ==
- Dudão, the title protagonist. An obese and religious boy, he is often trying to educate his friends and prevent them from committing bad deeds. In most of his speeches he always mentions "God" and "Jesus".
- Binho, Dudão's best friend. He is also religious like Dudão, and tends to be the most sensitive of the group, crying easily and usually being calmed down by Dudão. In some stories he shows a rivalry with Zuca.
- Rebeca, friend of Dudão and Binho and also the only girl in the gang. Just like them she is religious and often accompanies them, but tends to be the most aggressive and immature of the trio, usually being scolded by Dudão and learning with her mistakes.
- Paçoca, a naughty little boy that is one of the antagonists in the comic. He has blond hair, and he is often making malicious pranks (usually with Zuca, Pita and Tato) for fun that are usually disapproved by Dudão who tries to scold him. He tends to be the most arrogant and is usually the one who causes the most problems.
- Zuca, an Afro-descendant boy who is also one of the antagonists of the comic. He comes from a slightly poor family, is a bit aggressive and usually makes malicious pranks with Paçoca, Pita and Tato, that are usually disapproved by Dudão.
- Pita, a nerd boy who is also one of the antagonists of the comic. He wears glasses, a cap and has blond hair. Usually accompanies Paçoca, Zuca and Tato in malicious pranks that Dudão disapproves. Shows interest in video games and futuristic styles.
- Tato, another boy who is also one of the antagonists of the comic. He tends to be the most athlete, but he is also a bit aggressive. Usually accompanies Paçoca, Zuca and Tato in malicious pranks that Dudão disapproves.
- Baldinho, the youngest boy in the gang who is a friend of Dudão. He usually speaks a few words and repeats what others say.
- Lipão, a religious boy that is friend of Dudão, Binho, Rebeca and Baldinho. He has few appearances in the comics.
- Seu Jesão, Dudão's father.
- Peludo, Dudão's pet cat.

== Reception ==
In an academic survey carried out in 2011, the character Dudão was the 6th most remembered by children among Brazilian comic book characters.

=== Internet popularity ===
In 2020, the comic became an internet meme after scans were found on the internet, being rediscovered after several years forgotten, usually being the target of jokes through a shitposting group on Facebook. Most of the jokes were due to the art style (considered weird by many people, mainly due to the phallic shape of the eyes), and, mainly due to the fact of being hyper-evangelical, with religious fanaticism and the constant name-calling to any character, especially Dudão, both for being evangelical and for being obese. What explains the name-calling is that, in the 90s, not much was discussed about racism, homophobia and other prejudices, and nowadays it would be considered "politically incorrect" hence the controversy involved. The comics were also criticized by many for considering the series too similar to Monica's Gang. A fandub of the comics made by the YouTube channel "Luan.G.B 2003" also helped to popularize the comics, giving voices and personality to the characters.
