= Smudge (Monica and Friends) =

Brazilian cartoon character

- Monica and Friends character
- Smudge 7 years in Monica and Friends (top) and Smudge 15 years in Monica Adventures (bottom)
- First appearance: Removable Newspaper strips of 1961
- Created by: Maurício de Sousa
- Portrayed by: Gabriel Moreira (Monica and Friends: Bonds)
- Voiced by: Isaura Gomes (Feliz Natal pra Todos - As Aventuras da Turma da Mônica); Paulo Cavalcante (A Turma da Mônica em A Princesa e o Robô-present); James Carter Cathcart (English Dub, 90s); Roly Gutierrez (English Dub, 2019-present)

In-universe information
- Full name: Cássio Marques de Araújo
- Species: Human
- Gender: Male
- Family: Mrs. Lurdinha (mother), Mr. Antenor (father), Captain Fray (uncle), Chauvy (pet pig), Dustine (girlfriend)
- Origin: Lemon Tree District – SP, Brazil

Smudge, known as Cascão (Note: Portuguese for a dirt layer that may appear on the human skin when not washed frequently - in the Brazilian version) in Portuguese, is a fictional character of the Monica and Friends comic series created by Mauricio de Sousa. He is a 7-year-old boy who lives on the fictional Lemon Tree Street (Rua do Limoeiro), located in São Paulo, characterized by being a dirty child and having a strong fear of water. Originally introduced as just a random friend to Jimmy Five in newspaper strips published in 1961, the character became popular enough to become one of the most relevant and popular characters over the years appearing in several products, animations, films, in addition to becoming the protagonist of his own comic book released in 1982, which has remained in publication ever since.

Mauricio says he based the character on a child he knew while growing up in Mogi das Cruzes. The child was a friend of his brother Márcio, and was also not too hygienic. Since the friendship did not last, Mauricio never recalled his real name. His characterization has been both praised and criticized, becoming one of the best-known characters in the series.

== Characteristics ==
Smudge is best known for being a dirty boy, very similar to the character Pig-Pen from Peanuts, although he has an obsession and pride in his way of being and his habits, preferring to stay dirty and having an aversion to anything related to cleanliness and hygiene. He's also known for his great fear of water, often being justified as the reason why he prefers to stay dirty and as a result he often avoids any contact with water, whether by staying near rivers, going to the beach and avoiding leaving the house in rainy weather. Usually to avoid being caught by rain clouds he is seen carrying an umbrella in his hands which is considered his main paraphernalia to help protect him from getting wet in emergencies. In some stories he has demonstrated superhuman abilities such as being able to run at high speed to escape the rain, fly by swinging his arms like wings to escape falling into a river or pool or even show that he surpasses the strength of Monica to avoid being bathed, sometimes even comically showing himself to be stronger than popular heroes like Superman or The Flash.

In older stories, Smudge's obsession with dirty stuff also led him to be a "garbage addict", to the point that he would sometimes appear inside garbage cans, visiting the garbage dump, playing in mud puddles or showing interest in animals considered dirty or smelly such as pigs (notably having the pet pig Chauvy), skunks, rats and vultures; however, since the late 90s, due to politically correctness much of his interest in dirty things has changed in favor of more educational stories as he has stopped playing with trash and started caring about the environment by collecting trash or recycling old stuff in order to make new toys to play with, turning into the gang's handyman, often fixing the other kids' broken toys.

He also happens to be Jimmy Five's best friend, serving as the main sidekick to him in most stories. He is often the boy most convinced by Jimmy Five to participate in his "infallible plans" against Monica, serving as his accomplice frequently antagonizing Monica either by provoking her or participating in Jimmy Five's plans which often involve Smudge disguising himself by pretending to be someone else to deceive Monica, however both are often defeated by her beating them down with her stuffed rabbit. A running gag is that on many occasions Smudge is responsible for ruining Jimmy Five's plans by accident. In some stories Smudge also shows that he refuses to help Jimmy Five in his plans against Monica, as he knows that they always go wrong and end up with them being beaten in the end, however Jimmy always finds a way to convince or bribe Smudge to help him. He also dates Dustine (Cascuda) a girl who was initially presented as a female equivalent of him also being a dirt addict, however, over time she was rewritten to be more feminine and becoming clean, although she occasionally appears with dirt on her cheeks similar to her boyfriend.

Sometimes his friends (including Jimmy Five) or even his parents act as antagonists to him because they don't tolerate his preference for being dirty, usually showing that they can't stand his stench, even trying to create plans to make him take a bath, but Smudge always manages to find a way to escape and even convince them to accept him the way he is. He has also come to accumulate some villains obsessed with cleanliness who seek to give him a bath like the twins Cremilda and Clotilde, Dr. McClean or Cumulus, but in the same way Smudge always finds a way to defeat them.

However, he was once illegally portrayed taking a shower in a TV commercial for a Brazilian showerhead manufacturer. He was once also drawn carrying a bundle of clothes and cookies under heavy rain and in water up to his waist for a short story in a time when Southern Brazil was suffering a heavy rain season. The drawing was reproduced again in 2024 amidst the Rio Grande do Sul floods.

In Monica Adventure's Teen, Smudge is known to take a bath occasionally.

== Related characters ==
- Seu Antenor (Mr. Antenor) – Smudge's father, an avid Corinthians supporter just like his son. He sometimes tries to convince his son to take a bath, with no results. He spends the weekends with Smudge, and sometimes with his friend Seu Cebola and Jimmy Five, and sometimes both Cebola and Antenor even force Jimmy and Smudge to do what they enjoyed when younger.
- Dona Lurdinha (Mrs. Lurdinha) – Smudge's mother. Just like her husband, she tries hard to convince her son to take a bath, but the results are the same. She eventually tries to force Smudge to take a bath, using brute force, but there's always something to save Smudge from what he calls "death".
- Captain Fray (Capitão Feio, lit. "Captain Ugly") – One of Monica's Gang main enemies. He was once Smudge's uncle, but went mad and decided to be as dirty as his nephew. He lives in the underworld of the sewer system and leads a large army of "dirty beings", monsters made of dirt. He also has superpowers: Apart from flying, he can release dirt beams, move objects from a distance, or create objects using dust. Water works on him just like kryptonite works on Superman: Once he's wet, all his powers are gone. His dream is to make the entire world a dirtier place to live, and also to rule it. However, Monica and her friends always find a way to stop him. Captain somewhat has a good feeling towards Smudge, occasionally. He sometimes is the one to save him from any contact with water. On the other hand, there are strips in which he wants to destroy Smudge for Smudge being the dirtier being in the universe, a status that Captain desires.
- Chauvy (Chovinista) – Smudge's pet, this small pig hates water as much as his owner, but is sometimes seen taking a bath.
- Dustine (Cascuda) – Smudge's girlfriend. Although she was created only to be Smudge's lover, he sometimes chases other girls.

== Comic Book ==
Cover of Cascão (Smudge)'s first comic book cover (August 1982)

The first time Smudge starred in his own title was with his almanac "Almanaque do Cascão" which debuted in March 1979 bringing together stories starring him previously published in Monica and Jimmy Five comics by Abril during the 70s.

In August 1982, a few months after the end of the Pelezinho comic book, Mauricio de Sousa managed to convince the publisher Abril to publish 2 new comic books starring his characters Smudge and Chuck Billy in the same year. Both comics were published biweekly and were popular enough to continue publication alongside the Monica and Jimmy Five comics. The comic ended in December 1986 with 114 issues, later being moved to Globo from 1987 to 2006 with 467 issues, and is currently published by Panini Comics since 2007.

In March 2003, the comics stopped being published biweekly and became monthly. In 2016, the comic book reached the 700 issue mark, with all the issues already released by all publishers.

The series has been among the most popular in Brazil, between 2023 and 2024 it was listed as the 6th best-selling comic in the country.

== Other Appearances ==
=== TV series and Movies ===
Smudge appears in all animated series and films based on the comics, starting in the CICA commercials and having been present since the 1977 Christmas special. The first episode focused exclusively on him, "Cascão no País das Torneirinhas", was released in 1986 in the film As Novas Aventuras da Turma da Mônica. He was also the main focus of the sixth film in the Cine Gibi series, Cine Gibi 6 - Hora do Banho. He was initially voiced by Isaura Gomes, but since 1984 he has been voiced by Paulo Cavalcante.

In the live-action films he was played by Gabriel Moreira in Laços and Lições. In the Monica Adventures film released in 2024 he was played by Théo Salomão.

=== Video Games ===
Smudge appears in the 1993 game Turma da Mônica em: O Resgate adapted by Tectoy from the Japanese game Wonder Boy III: The Dragon's Trap as a non-playable character who appears selling items to the player in stores. In 2014 he was the protagonist of an endless runner game released for Android and iOS titled simply "Jogo do Cascão" (lit. Smudge Game). In 2015, another game was released for Android and iOS called "Cascão Encanado" (lit. Piped Smudge). He is also one of the default playable characters in the 2018 game Mônica e a Guarda dos Coelhos.

=== Graphic Novels ===
Smudge has appeared in a number of graphic novels in the Graphic MSP series developed by various artists. His first appearance was in Turma da Mônica – Laços released in 2013 produced by siblings Vitor and Lu Cafaggi, also appearing in its sequels Turma da Mônica: Lições from 2015 and Turma da Mônica: Lembranças from 2017, as well as the film adaptations of the first two graphic novels.

In 2020 a graphic novel focused only on Smudge entitled Cascão: Temporal was published having been made by the artist Camilo Solano.

== Reception and legacy ==
Smudge is considered one of the most iconic characters in Brazilian comics. The character's reputation for never taking a bath and always managing to escape the water has become a notable characteristic, to the point that many fans have even opposed seeing the character give in to political correctness and take a bath so as not to serve as a bad influence on children. Stories based on this have even been published in comics over the years. Despite this, over time the character began to be portrayed as caring about the environment and being against pollution. However, his fear of water has already been used to his advantage in promotions involving the character. In 2012, an attraction at the Wet'n Wild water park called "Ilha Misteriosa do Cascão" was launched in partnership with MSP. In 2015, a carnival song was released in which Smudge decides finally to take a bath, but in the lyrics he can't because he can't find any water. In the same year he appeared taking a bath in an April Fools' joke where it was revealed that the image was fake.

His relationship with other characters has also been discussed among the public. Despite him having Dustine as his girlfriend, some fans have notably preferred to see him dating Maggy, especially based on the relationship between Monica and Jimmy Five who despite the rivalry sometimes appear showing an interest for each other, even becoming official as lovers in Monica Adventures, which served as inspiration for stories based on this later. After the success of the Monica and Jimmy Five wedding issue in Monica Adventures, MSP showed interest in doing the wedding between Smudge and Dustine.

=== Association Football ===
Over the years Smudge has been Mauricio de Sousa's most popular character when it comes to representing association football in the Monica and Friends media, especially among fans of the Corinthians team, of which the character is often portrayed as a fan in his stories sometimes even paying tribute to the team. In 1977, the character promised that he would take a bath if Corinthians beat Ponte Preta in the final of the Campeonato Paulista that year. In 2015, the character appeared with the team in honor of Mauricio de Sousa's 80th birthday. As a result, his best friend Jimmy Five is often portrayed as a fan of Palmeiras, known as Corinthians' long-time rival as a way to represent peace between the two teams despite the rivalry. Initially, the character was portrayed as a Santos fan in a 1960s comic strip, but it only served as a recurring joke at the time where he mentioned being interested in supporting another team.

In 2002 the football player Ronaldo made a haircut inspired by Smudge playing well during the 2002 FIFA World Cup. The hairstyle consisted of the hair Smudge cut in the forehead region player format while the rest of the hair was all shaved, became popular among fans at the time. This was acknowledged in an advertisement for Guaraná Antarctica aired shortly after the World Cup, in which Smudge and Ronaldo interact with each other.
