= Bug-a-Booo =

Brazilian comic strip

"Bug-a-Booo" ("Turma do Penadinho" in original Portuguese)
- Cover of the first issue of Penadinho's almanac, showing some of the main characters.
- Author: Mauricio de Sousa
- Current status/schedule: Running.
- Launch date: 1963
- Genre: Humor comics

Bug-a-Booo ("Turma do Penadinho") is a Brazilian comic strip, created in 1963 and part of the Monica's Gang series. All of the characters are monsters or other supernatural creatures, none of them being a human being. The main location for their stories is a cemetery. However, their stories are not intended to be scary, they are sometimes classified as “terrir”, which is a portmanteau of the Portuguese words "terror" (horror) and "rir" (to laugh), which is equivalent to comedy horror. In some of the stories, they have to deal with the fact that vampires, ghosts, zombies and mummies are no longer appreciated as characters of horror films. People instead are opting for assassins, psychopaths, serial killers, etc.

== Characters ==
- Bug-a-Booo (Penadinho João Paulo Cabral) – Bug-a-Booo is the main character, a short ghost. Originally he was introduced in 1963 in the Jimmy Five's comic strips, as a friend of the titular character, in his first appearances he was an unnamed ghost child whose family had immigrated from Europe to Brazil. He continued appearing in the Jimmy Five comic strips until the following year when Mauricio de Sousa decided to create a separate comic strip focused on him and also giving him the current name. He is actually invisible, but wears a white sheet so he can be seen. In one strip, it is stated that he was engaged to a woman named Ernestina and was about to open a factory of disposable socks for people suffering from foot odor before he died. An unnamed friend of his reveals while regretting Bug's death in his death anniversary at his grave that he ended up both marrying Ernestina and opening the factory, though the factory closed three months later and Ernestina became obese.
- Lady MacDeath (Dona Morte) – Lady MacDeath is a Grim Reaper, the personification of Death who is responsible of going after all people whose time to die has come, although unlike a typical Grim Reaper, sometimes her body is not pictured as made of bones. She uses her sickle to kill people, by hitting them in the head with the back of it rather than using the blade (often hitting the ghost again to resuscitate if necessary), and then she takes their souls to the purgatory, for them to be judged and sent whether to hell or heaven (sometimes after much bureaucracy). She always carries a list with the name of the people she must kill on the day. Most of her stories feature a pursuit, sometimes punctuated with struggles faced every day by normal people. Maurico says that the purpose of creating her is "taking death less seriously, while it doesn't come to us." In her earlier appearances, she was portrayed as male.
- Vic Vampire (Zé Vampir, full name José Morcego (Bat) Vampiro) – Vic is a yellow-skinned vampire, and therefore, he is able to turn himself into a bat. He feeds on blood and fears crosses (even though he lives in a cemetery full of them), sunlight, garlic and holy water. In one strip, it is revealed that he was born 300 years ago in the fictional city of Transilvânia do Sul (South Transylvania), near Varginha and turned into a vampire at infancy after one of them bit his dog, which in turn bit him and his parents. Vic has the power to turn other people vampires with a bite on their necks.
- Moe the Mummy (Muminho) – Moe is a mummy of Egyptian ancestry. When the swabs which cover his bodies are taken out, Moe appears either invisible, as if the swabs were covering nothing, or as a dry corpse.
- Frank – A reference to Frankenstein, Frank is a green construct with a very weak brain, so that the virtue he least holds is intelligence.
- Wolfgang (Lobi) – A charming werewolf. While being able to talk, think and walk by two feet, he must live side-to-side with his canidae instincts, like chasing cats, urinating on lamp posts and trees, and howling to the moon. He hasn't an "official" human from, thus this form may change its personality dramatically from story to story. He has fangs, claws and yellow eyes.
- Skully (Cranicola) – Skully is single skull, which rests all day on top of a stone. He cannot walk nor move (although in some stories he is seen jumping around), but on the other hand, he provides fine conversations to whoever speaks to him.
- Al Ashmore (Zé Cremadinho) – Al Ashmore is nothing but the remains of someone who's been cremated. However, he is still able to talk, and jumps around just like Skully does sometimes. In most of his appearances, he is confused with dust and is attacked by broomsticks and vacuum cleaners.
- Sid Skully (Zé Caveirinha) – A full skeleton. He is clumsy and is always losing his bones.
- Sally Soul (Alminha) – Sally is Bug's girlfriend, although they are constantly seen having arguments with each other. Like Bug, she is actually an invisible ghost who wears a white sheet.
- Little Boy Boo (Pixuquinha) - The Bug's nephew. He is a child ghost.
- Espírito de Porco - In Brazil, pranksters are sometimes called "espíritos de porco" (lit. "pig spirit"). Espírito de Porco is thus a pig-nosed ghost who likes pulling irritating pranks on the other residents of the cemetery.

== Media ==
In 2015 a graphic novel based on the Bug-a-Booo characters entitled "Penadinho: Vida", was released as part of the Graphic MSP being made by Paulo Crumbim and Cristina Eiko. This graphic novel had a sequel in 2020 entitled "Penadinho: Lar".

Bug-a-Booo has also appeared in a few of the Monica Toy episodes, with one episode under the title Penadinho Toy, starring Bug-a-Booo, Skully, and Vic Vampire.
