= Época (Brazilian magazine) =

Brazilian magazine

- The 16 June 2008 cover of Época magazine
- Editorial Director: Diego Escosteguy
- Categories: News magazine
- Frequency: Weekly
- Publisher: Editora Globo
- Total circulation: 389,000 (2012)
- First issue: 1 May 1998; 28 years ago
- Final issue: 6 May 2021
- Country: Brazil
- Based in: Rio de Janeiro, Brazil
- Language: Portuguese
- Website: epoca.globo.com
- ISSN: 1415-5494

Época (Brazilian Portuguese pronunciation: [ˈɛpokɐ]; lit. 'Era') is a Brazilian weekly news and analysis magazine. The magazine was started in May 1998. It is published by Editora Globo, part of the Grupo Globo media conglomerate. Época's style is based on the German magazine Focus, emphasizing the use of images and graphics, and even their logos share some similarities.

== Circulation ==
In 2010, Época had a circulation of 408,000 copies. It dipped to 389,000 copies in 2012 and slightly rose to 393,000 in 2013. In 2018, it circulates over 500,000 copies weekly and has 5.9 million unique digital users.

== Criticism and controversies ==
=== Francenildo Case ===
In March 2006, Época magazine became involved in the political scandal involving the breach of banking secrecy of the handyman Francenildo Santos Costa, which culminated in the fall of the Finance Minister, Antônio Palocci.

== Delivery ==
Beginning in 2018, subscribers receive Época, Globo, and Valor Econômico delivered together on Fridays.
