= Monica and Friends =

Comic series from Brazil

- Cover of the first issue of Monica's Gang in English by Panini

Publication information
- Publisher: Abril (1970–86); Globo (1987–2006); Panini Comics (2007–present)
- Schedule: Monthly
- Format: Comic strip Comic book
- Genre: Children; Comedy; Parody; Adventure; Fantasy; Science-fiction
- Publication date: 1959–present (as comic strip); 1970–present (as comic book)
- Main characters: Monica (Mônica); Jimmy Five (Cebolinha); Smudge (Cascão); Maggy (Magali); Franklin (Franjinha); Blu (Bidu); "Milena" (Milena)

Creative team
- Created by: Mauricio de Sousa

Monica and Friends (Portuguese: Turma da Mônica), previously published as Monica's Gang in Anglophone territories and as Frizz and Friends in London, is a Brazilian comic book series and media franchise created by Mauricio de Sousa.

The series originated in a comic strip first published by the newspaper Folha da Manhã in 1959, in which the protagonists were Blu (Bidu) and Franklin (Franjinha), however, in the following years the series was shaped towards its current identity with the introduction of new characters such as Monica (Mônica) and Jimmy Five (Cebolinha) who became the new protagonists. The stories revolve around a group of children who live in a fictional neighborhood in São Paulo known as Lemon Tree District (Bairro do Limoeiro) which has a street with the same name called Lemon Tree Street (Rua do Limoeiro) where Monica and her several friends live, inspired by the neighborhood of Cambuí in Campinas and the city of Mogi das Cruzes, where Mauricio spent his childhood.

Although the title of the franchise mainly refers to the core group of children who live on Lemon Tree Street, it's also used as an umbrella title who encompasses other works created by Mauricio throughout his career such as Chuck Billy 'n' Folks, Tina's Pals, Lionel's Kingdom, Bug-a-Booo, The Cavern Clan, Bubbly the Astronaut, Horacio's World, The Tribe, and others, since stories from these series are frequently published in comics focused in characters such as Monica, Jimmy Five, Smudge, Maggy and Chuck Billy. Since 1970, in the form of comic books, the characters have been published by publishers such as Abril (1970-1986), Globo (1987-2006) and Panini Comics (2007-present), totaling almost 2,000 issues already published for each character.

The English title of the series was later changed to Monica and Friends. The characters and comics were subsequently adapted into, among other media, an animated television series as well as films, most of which are anthologies.

In 2008, a spin-off series, Monica Teen, was created in a manga style and features the characters as teenagers.

Monica is considered the most well-known comic book character in Brazil. In 2015 alone, the characters were used on three million products for over 150 companies. Nowadays the comics are sold in 40 countries in 14 languages.

== Publication history ==
The original Portuguese logo.

Maurício de Sousa, then-reporter for Folha da Manhã, in 1959, decided to enter the field of comics hitherto disputed in the country. In the same year made his first characters Blu and Franklin, and decided that Blu would be the protagonist. Both were based on his own childhood, Franklin based on Maurício himself and Blu on his pet dog Cuíca. The main inspirations of Monica and Friends were through American comics like Peanuts and Little Lulu, which have inspired some recurring themes like the boys' club. In the following year of 1960, the characters gained ground through the children's magazine Zaz Traz by publisher Editora Outubro, later getting their own comic titled Bidu by Editora Continental. However, the magazines were canceled that same year.

After that the characters returned to newspaper strips, the character Jimmy Five which had won great popularity in the previous magazines has become protagonist of their own strips of newspaper next to Blu and Franklin in 1961. Seeing potential in the character, Mauricio went on to create several supporting characters to appear in the Jimmy Five strips, like Smudge and Specs. But after so long Maurício received a complaint for the lack of feminine characters in his comics. So to avoid further controversy, in 1963 Monica was created, initially as a supporting character in the Jimmy Five strips (at first as the Specs' little sister) based on Mauricio's real daughter Mônica Sousa. Over time, the success and the charisma of the character made her be the protagonist of the series alongside Jimmy Five which became her sidekick. Also in 1963, Mauricio began to create new projects of comic strips with other characters without links with Monica and Jimmy Five, like Zezinho and Hiroshi (now called Chuck Billy 'n' Folks), The Cavern Clan, Bug-a-Booo, The Tribe and Raposão (now called Lionel's Kingdom).

Cover of the first edition of Monica launched in 1970.

The characters only returned to be published in a monthly comic book from 1970, by publisher Abril, initially under the title of "Mônica e Sua Turma" (Monica and Her Gang), later being changed to "Mônica" and "Turma da Mônica" (Monica's Gang), the latter title used only for merchandising. With so many of the characters ever created by Mauricio in strips of newspaper also began to appear in the comics of Monica's Gang. At that time the area of comics was more competitive in Brazil, many Brazilian artists were trying to hold his own in the stalls along the publications of American comics like Donald Duck, José Carioca, Little Lulu, and many others. Even with these new comics, Monica's Gang remained with their good sales on newsstands and with this soon came to the Jimmy Five's solo comic book three years later. Sales were great and with that a contract with the footballer Pelé was made for the launch of a character based on him, the Pelezinho, which was a phenomenon among children at the time, marking time in the history of Brazilian comics. Pelezinho was one of the few black characters made by Maurício, and his design wasn't the most flattering to the black community, with a pale colored circle around the character's mouth to represent his lips, a concept made infamous by the black face depiction of African people. In late 2013, however, Pelezinho's design was updated to reflect more modern sensibilities.

The staff of cartoonists has grown, leading to the foundation of the Estúdios Maurício de Sousa, that produce comics with the characters created by Mauricio de Sousa, and other marketing projects and cartoons of the characters. The first attempts to make a Monica and Friends cartoon occurred in the late 60s during a deal with Cica food company that produced some commercials for television, these being commercial who originated the character Thunder, who is currently a main character of the Lionel's Kingdom stories. The first film was only released in 1982, As Aventuras da Turma da Mônica which was produced in partnership with Black & White & Color and distributed by Embrafilme.

Over the years, other characters gained their own comic books, like Smudge (1982), Chuck Billy (1982) and Maggy (1989). Other media have strengthened over the years and Monica-branded merchandise were launched, with products like books, toys, discs, CD-ROM and video games. A Monica-themed amusement park was created in 1993 in São Paulo, titled "Parque da Mônica" (Monica Park). In 2008 the franchise received a manga-style comic entitled Monica Teen.

== Characters ==
Some of the main characters of Monica.

The Monica and Friends series has an extensive amount of main and secondary characters. It has as main protagonists Monica, Jimmy Five, Smudge and Maggy and each has its own comic book. Currently the character Milena was recently added as the fifth main character of the group. Other characters from other series created by Mauricio de Sousa are also included on Monica and Friends, making crossovers or quotations from each other in several stories, among several other characters. The main setting of the stories is the fictional Lemon Tree Street (Rua do Limoeiro).

Most stories focus on the daily lives of the main characters and occasionally on the secondary characters; the humour usually uses various types of repetitions, allusions, appeals to the nonsense, paranomasias, sarcasm and metalanguage. The stories with Monica and Jimmy Five revolve around the conflict between the two. Jimmy Five is a troublemaker and bully who always tries to scold Monica or steal her stuffed bunny to give knots in its ears (usually having Smudge or another boy accomplice), always having Monica get her revenge by hitting him with her stuffed bunny, often leaving him bruised and with black eyes. Often Jimmy Five makes plans against her with various traps, sometimes using Franklin's inventions or talking Smudge into helping, but he always loses to Monica at the end.

Smudge's stories often focus on his penchant for dirt and mess and his fear of water, having never bathed in his life, and constantly being threatened by villains or his friends to take a shower, with him always succeeding in not getting wet and staying dirty. The stories with Maggy generally focus on her gluttony, with a superhuman ability to eat more than a normal person without ever getting fat and sometimes stealing food from her friends.

Among the villains are Captain Fray, a supervillain with the power to control garbage and dirt, and Lord Raider, a space rabbit whose first appearance was in the movies. A joke often breaks the fourth wall.

=== Related works ===
Other related works which relate to the series are:

- Thunder - Based on the first character of Monica and Friends, it shows the character Blu, a sentient blue dog of the Schnauzer breed, as acting as a mere actor in a studio of comics.
- Chuck Billy 'n' Folks - Focuses on the comic daily life of Chuck Billy, a lazy farmer boy and his friends who live on a farm in Brazil's countryside. He's the one that most often appears in contact with Monica and Friends. The character have his own spin-off comic book series. As Monica and Friends, he received a spin-off manga-style comic in 2013 called Chico Bento Moço (Chuck Billy Young Man).
- Bug-a-Booo - Focuses on comedy stories involving monsters of horror films (ghosts, vampires, werewolfs, Frankenstein and even Death) in a cemetery.
- Tina's Pals - Shows a daily routine of a group of college students and their daily lives as they date, go to college, among other issues. In 2014, it received its own spin-off comic book series.
- The Funnies - Focuses on the comic adventures of Bubbly, an astronaut, as he explores space.
- Lionel's Kingdom - Focuses on the daily lives of a group of anthropomorphic animals of different species in a forest led by a lion king.
- The Cavern Clan - Focuses on Pitheco, a caveman inventor who is living in the midst of pre-history and tries to revolutionize humanity with his inventions.
- Horacio's World - Focuses on the life of a young philosopher, the dinosaur Horacio, and his friends.
- The Tribe - Focuses on an Amazonian native, Tom-Tom, who lives in a tropical forest constantly threatened by white men.

== Publications ==
Monica and Friends and its related works are released in a number of different books. Firstly, they were published by Editora Abril, from 1970 to 1986, then Editora Globo, from 1987 to 2006. From 2007 on, Panini Comics was chosen to keep the publications. So far there are comic books starring many characters, among the best known and sold are the characters of Monica, Jimmy Five, Smudge, Maggy and Chuck Billy, plus almanacs with republication of classic stories with varying characters. In 2015 was released an app for smartphones gathering more than 500 editions of comics franchise for download.

== Franchise ==
=== Television and film adaptations ===
==== Animated series ====
The characters of Monica and Friends are also the protagonists of which can be considered the first Brazilian animation series. After being introduced on television as advertising-boys in TV advertisements from the mid-1960s, complete stories began to be produced in 1976 starting with a Christmas TV special which aired on Rede Globo. With the success of the animations, Mauricio managed to get his characters to star in feature films for the cinema in 1982, starting with the film As Aventuras da Turma da Mônica, which contained stories adapted from different comics and this format of compiling episodes (which later aired on TV) continued in the following decades, with the films being also distributed directly to video over the time. The only two films that managed to feature full original stories were A Princesa e o Robô from 1984 and Uma Aventura no Tempo from 2007.

In 1999, a series of animated shorts with the characters was produced for Globo's children's program Angel Mix during negotiations for a sketch featuring Mauricio de Sousa's characters on the channel. A regular broadcast of the series on TV only occurred in 2004 after negotiations with the Cartoon Network that since this year began broadcasting new episodes exclusively on the channel, still remaining on the schedule together of sister channels Tooncast and Boomerang.

- As Aventuras da Turma da Mônica (1982)
- As Novas Aventuras da Turma da Mônica (1986)
- Mônica e a Sereia do Rio (1987)
- O Bicho-Papão (1987)
- A Estrelinha Mágica (1988, direct-to-video)
- Chico Bento, Óia a Onça! (1990, direct-to-video)
- O Natal de Todos Nós (1992, direct-to-video)
- Quadro a Quadro (1996, direct-to-video)
- Videogibi: O Mônico (1997, direct-to-video)
- Videogibi: O Plano Sangrento (1998, direct-to-video)
- Videogibi: O Estranho Soro do Dr. X (1998, direct-to-video)
- Videogibi: A Ilha Misteriosa (1999, direct-to-video)
- Coleção Grandes Aventuras da Turma da Mônica (2002, recovery direct-to-video including new episodes)
- Cine Gibi: O Filme (2004)
- Cine Gibi 2 (2005, direct-to-video)
- Cine Gibi 3: Planos Infalíveis (2008, direct-to-video)
- Cine Gibi 4: Meninos e Meninas (2009, direct-to-video)
- Cine Gibi 5: Luzes, Câmera, Ação! (2010, direct-to-video)
- Se Liga na Turma da Mônica - Volume 1 (2011, direct-to-video)
- Se Liga na Turma da Mônica - Volume 2 (2012, direct-to-video)
- Cine Gibi 6 - Hora do Banho (2013, direct-to-video)
- Cine Gibi 7 - Bagunça Animal (2014, direct-to-video)
- Cine Gibi 8 - Tá Brincando? (2015, direct-to-video)
- Cine Gibi 9 - Vamos Fazer de Conta! (2016, direct-to-video)

==== Related animations ====
Series launched to promote "Monica Toy" line launched by Tok & Stok, which features an ultra-stylized version of the characters of Monica in traits that refer to Toy Arts and famous franchises like Hello Kitty, Pucca and Gogo's Crazy Bones. There are currently 9 seasons, with mini-episodes each with about 30 seconds long, with 2D animation and exclusive language for web delivery.

From the episode "Hiccups" (released on July 17, 2013), the series was renamed and had its shortened to just "Monica Toy" title. On October 7, 2013, the series premiered on Cartoon Network in the interprograma format, debuting two episodes a week and airing at various times.

In 2017, the Vamos Brincar com a Turma da Mônica series was announced during the Comic Con Experience in São Paulo. In 2019, MSP announced that the series would launch on Gloob and Gloobinho channels in 2020, the first episodes of the production were made available on the now-defunct Giga Gloob app on October 12, 2022.

On July 11, 2023, after Giga Gloob was discontinued by Globo, the first 10 episodes were transferred and made available on Globoplay streaming. The second part, with 16 episodes, was released on the platform on October 12, the same day the series debuted on the Gloobinho channel.

==== Live-actions ====
In 2019, in cooperation with Paris Filmes, Globo Filmes and Paramount Pictures, Mauricio de Sousa Produções released in Brazilian cinemas the movie Turma da Mônica: Laços, on June 27, being directed by Daniel Rezende. The movie was based on the best-selling eponymous graphic novel, written and drawn by siblings Victor Cafaggi and Lu Cafaggi. This was the first Monica and Friends live-action movie in which the main characters are played by real-life children, since the previous live-action movies were presented in the form of theater performances using adults in articulated mascots costumes.

The plot of the movie revolves around the relationship of the friends. When Jimmy Five's dog, Fluffy, is abruptly abducted, the children must unite and eventually overcome their differences while facing new adventures on the way so they can bring their loyal friend back home.

The movie presents Giulia Benite as Monica, Kevin Vechiatto as Jimmy Five, Laura Rauseo as Maggy and Gabriel Moreira as Smudge. It has been overly praised by Brazilian critics, who praises the balance between cartoonish situations with human conflicts. The movie represented one of the highest Brazilian box office of 2019.

In 2021, Turma da Mônica: Lições was released in Brazilian cinemas on December 30. It is the sequel to Turma da Mônica: Laços, and based on the graphic novel of the same name written and drawn by siblings Victor Cafaggi and Lu Cafaggi. The film features Monica, Jimmy Five, Maggy and Smudge forget to do their homework and run away from school (6th or 7th year of elementary school). But not everything goes as expected, and Mônica is transferred to another school, triggering the group's separation. The decision was made by the parents of the four friends, who think that they are spending too much time together and that this could harm them in their responsibilities. From this rupture, they are forced to find new friends and face their own fears and insecurities. The group will then have to face the consequences of their decisions, mature and discover the real value and meaning of the word friendship.

MSP formed a partnership with Globoplay (Globo's streaming service) produced the live-action series inspired by Monica and Friends characters and being the sequel to the films Turma da Mônica: Laços and Turma da Mônica: Lições, titled Turma da Mônica – A Série, which premiered on July 21, 2022, which contains 8 episodes.

On November 27, 2023, it was renewed for a second season.

A spin-off of the franchise presented by Franklin and Milena, accompanied by the dog Blu. The series began filming on July 6, 2022 until it concluded in September. On February 15, 2024, Max (formerly HBO Max) announced that the series would debut on February 27 for its platform and also on the Discovery Kids channel.

=== Video games ===
Top: Turma da Mônica na Terra dos Monstros Bottom: Wonder Boy in Monster World, on which the former game is based

In the 1990s, Westone developed three Monica and Friends—based titles for Tectoy for the Master System and Mega Drive, modified from installments in Westone's Wonder Boy series.

Console	Original game	Original release	Modified game	Release
Master System	Wonder Boy in Monster Land	1987	Mônica no Castelo do Dragão	1991
Master System	Wonder Boy III: The Dragon's Trap	1989	Turma da Mônica em O Resgate	1993
Mega Drive	Wonder Boy in Monster World	1991	Turma da Mônica na Terra dos Monstros	1994

In the 1990s, MSP released three CD-ROMs with short stories complemented by minigames: Mônica Dentuça (1995), Cebolinha e Floquinho (1996) and A Roça do Chico Bento (1998). Two CDs for creating comic books with both Monica and Chuck Billy were also released.

In September 2010, Tec Toy announced that they would produce an exclusive game for videogame console Zeebo Turma da Mônica - Vamos Brincar Nº1, but the game was canceled months later. The idea was to create a series of eight puzzle games, but due to the end of the island the project was canceled.

In 2012, "Quero Ser da Turma da Mônica", a game where the user can create a digital avatar in the style of the characters, was released for iOS. In 2013 a game was released for iOS and Android called "Coelhadas da Mônica" (Bunny-Bashing Monica), a puzzle game like Angry Birds. And in 2014, the game "Jogo do Cascão" (The Smudge Game) was released as a 2D platform running game with multiple stages.

In 2018, a tower defense game using 8-bit sprites was made by developer Mad Mimic entitled "Mônica e a Guarda dos Coelhos" and was released for PlayStation 4, Xbox One, Nintendo Switch and computer. In 2025, the game Minecraft received skins based on Monica and Friends.

=== Theme park ===
An amusement park themed with Mauricio de Sousa's characters is located at the Eldorado Shopping in São Paulo. It was opened in January 1993, and features a number of attractions, like the "Carrossel do Horácio" (Horacio's merry-go-round, a carousel featuring dinosaurs instead of horses), the 3-D cinema, and many more. The Parque da Mônica of Curitiba and of Rio de Janeiro were also created, in 1998 and 2001, respectively, but both were closed, in 2000 and 2005, respectively. Until the end of 2006, it had its own comic book, featuring adventures of Monica and her friends at the park. When Panini Comics started to publish Mauricio's works, this comic was replaced by Turma da Mônica (Monica and Friends).

The park was removed from Eldorado Shopping Center on early 2010, when the space occupied by it was asked back by the shopping administrators. Mauricio de Sousa had already announced that the mall had requested the area back in July 2009. The administration of the Shopping said that the mall was seeking more up-to-date alternatives, which fall under consumers' expectations.

In March 2015, it was announced that the park would be reopened at Shopping SP Market.

== Merchandising ==
In the late 60s a line of dolls with characters Monica, Jimmy Five, Thunder, Horacio and Lucinda was manufactured by Trol Company, this was the first merchandising of the franchise. The character Thunder became the official mascot of a tomato sauce brand of the food company Cica around the late 60s. An extensive line of toys and other products with the characters began to be manufactured since the 70s by various toy companies and remain heavily sold to the present in Brazilian stores. In 2004, Monica alone was considered one of the most profitable toy characters by the director of the manufacturer Multibrink, which is one of the current toy manufacturers in the franchise.

During the 80s, the franchise also came to have its own store network. The Lojinha da Mônica and Trenzinho da Mônica, had branches in several states of Brazil, selling products related to characters. In 2013, the franchise was restarted in the form of an e-commerce portal.

=== Food products ===
In addition to Cica, Mauricio has formed long-lasting partnerships, providing his characters for a series of food products such as alfajores, pasta, cookies, etc. In 1993, a brand of chocolate bars was launched in partnership with Nestlé with the characters printed in white chocolate on each bar, although it was discontinued after the 90s the brand became memorable among many who grew up in the decade to the point that many fans asked for the brand to return, the chocolate was announced to have a return at the end of 2017, but this did not happen.

In 1994 Mauricio formed a partnership with the fruit company Fischer to sell small selected apples to children with their characters printed on the packaging. The brand became popular to the point of selling 900 thousand tons of packages every month, according to Mauricio his idea came when he visited a farm that produced smaller apples that were used to produce paste, fertilizer or animal food, however, Mauricio decided to target these apples to children.

A brand of instant noodles has been sold since 1986 manufactured by Nissin Foods being known as "Nissin Miojo Turma da Mônica" traditionally in meat, chicken and tomato flavors. In 2020 a line focused on Chuck Billy 'n' Folks was launched with different flavors.

== International distribution ==
Monica and Friends and related works have been published in 40 countries in 14 languages, including Spanish, Greek and Japanese.

=== Europe ===
In Germany, comics were published between 1975 and 1980 under the name Fratz und Freunde and years later as Monica und Ihre Freunde.

In the UK, comics have already been published under the name Frizz and Friends for a short time.

In Italy, some comic books and classic episodes of cartoon were distributed on DVDs in the 90s, the cartoon was broadcast on Rai Due channel under the title La Banda di Monica.

=== Asia ===
In Indonesia, the series is published under the title Monika dan kawan kawan, the comics are published there since 1997, along the comic books of the characters Jimmi Lima (Jimmy Five) and Ciko Bento (Chuck Billy N' Folks).

In China the comics were distributed to schools in 2007, receiving years later adaptation of the cartoon, in 2011 one of the albums was awarded to children's literature.

=== Others ===
There were plans for distribution in the United States and some Latin American countries, but they never came to fruition (with the exception of the proper cartoon broadcast dubbed into Spanish in some Latin American countries), however translated comics in English and Spanish are sold directly in Brazil. Episodes of the cartoon dubbed in English are available on YouTube.

== Criticism ==
=== Perceived decline in quality ===
Over the years, comics have become the target of criticism from many fans due to the decline in quality in both the art and the script of the stories. One of the biggest criticisms from the public is MSP's apparent redemption to political correctness over the years, having started to make stories that are less aggressive and more educational, taking away much of the charm and humor that the series had in its old years. Mauricio de Sousa has even declared that he does not like political correctness because it takes away his team's freedom and that he doesn't like to see children involved in politics, choosing to try to make his comics as accessible as possible for all audiences.

On social media, people have noticed the laziness in the art of comics published in the 2020s, with stories occurring where the same character's art is used in more than one panel with few changes, in addition to the use of digitized texts and onomatopoeias (as opposed to old comics where they were all drawn and made manually) and the use of PNG images, in addition to criticism of high prices and lower pages in modern comics.

== Controversies ==
=== Censorship ===
==== Military Dictatorship ====
During the Military Dictatorship, the four main Brazilian publishers: Abril, RGE (Rio Gráfica Editora), EBAL (Editora Brasil-América Limitada), and O Cruzeiro created a code named "Código de Ética" (Ethics Code), which featured a seal inspired by the Comics Code Authority of the United States. Several other comic genres were threatened, leaving almost exclusively children's comics.

Beyond self-censorship, state-imposed censorship was present as well. The story O Sequestro do Cascão (lit. The Kidnapping of Smudge) had to be renamed due to the kidnapping of Charles Burke Elbrick by the National Liberation Action and the 8th October Revolutionary Movement, and MSP was scolded for showing Jimmy Five's buttocks in a scene where he was taking a shower. Mauricio also had travelled to Brasília in person to submit the scripts of his cartoons to federal censorship. In Chucky Billy's comics produced during the dictatorship, his caipira accent was heavily censored until the 80s. Despite this, Monica and Friends were less affected by the censorship compared to other comics at the time. Ever since his involvement with the Associação dos Desenhistas de São Paulo (lit. Association of Cartoonists from São Paulo), Mauricio avoids expressing his political views on his comics.

==== Post Military Dictatorship ====
Starting in the late 2000s and early 2010s, when the comics started being published by Panini, old comics started being censored when republished in almanacs, such as weapons being erased or replaced by other things such as fingers (to replace guns) or water bottles (if the original weapons in question were toy guns with water) — there was one issue were a machine gun was replaced by a lobster—, dialogues being altered and art being edited to change the context of scenes, with many of the changes being considered exaggerated and unnecessary by the public with new rules such as Monica not hitting others with her stuffed rabbit and Jimmy Five and Smudge not teasing Monica as they used to, in addition to the trend of more characters representing minority groups with greater prominence in Milena being placed as prominently as the classic quartet with the aim of showing more representation to Afro-Brazilian people.

In 2020, during the government of Jair Bolsonaro, one question of the ENEM that featured a comic strip of Monica and Friends that criticized deforestation was withdrawn as the then-president asked for.

== Legacy ==
The popularity of Mauricio de Sousa's work with his characters has been highly praised, often leading to him being considered a Brazilian Walt Disney, and Monica and Friends being considered his best known work.

Comics have often been cited and used in school work and have helped children learn to read more easily in schools in Brazil. Special educational comic book publications involving the characters have also been praised, including the "Você Sabia? Turma da Mônica" series that started to be published in 2003.

The characters were even praised in other countries. In South Korea, the businessman responsible for promoting the characters in the country even told President Lula that he liked the characters because he didn't consider them inappropriate like other cartoons, and he even didn't mind Monica hitting other characters with her bunny, considering it not to be real violence.

=== Internet popularity ===
Several memes have been made based on Monica and Friends over the years. In 2009, a blog was created on Tumblr entitled Porra, Mauricio! (lit. Damn it, Mauricio!) became known for making comical posts "criticizing" various scenes from comics taken out of context, criticizing not only Mauricio de Sousa, but also the characters for their actions in the scenes. In a short time, it became popular to the point of totaling four million hits in the first half of 2010 with the blog even being praised by Mauricio himself and also being awarded in the category of Best Tumblr.

Around 2016, a Facebook shitposting group called Turma da Mônica Shitposting gained relevance and was responsible for generating several memes and edits with the characters. Among the best-known memes were "Turma da Inbonha" and "Ata", which caught the attention of MSP, which referenced the memes in the comics. This group was also responsible for helping to popularize another previously obscure Brazilian comic book from the 90s called Dudão, which became a joke and was even accused of being a controversial rip-off of Monica and Friends, to the point where it also became a meme with its own shitposting group on Facebook.

The official YouTube channel has also been considered one of the most popular among Brazilian children. In 2019, the channel was in second place in the ranking of Brazilian Children's Animated Content, losing only to Galinha Pintadinha. In 2024, it reached the mark of 20 million subscribers.
