= Jimmy Five =

Brazilian comic character

- Monica's Gang's character
- First appearance: Zaz Traz #2 (1960)
- Created by: Mauricio de Sousa
- Portrayed by: Kevin Vechiatto (Monica and Friends: Bonds)
- Voiced by: Ivete Jayme (1970s-1980s); Angélica Santos (1980s-present); Alex Minei (Turma da Mônica Jovem); Stephanie Pearson (English Dub, 90s); Ulises Otero (English Dub, 2019); Julia Sales (English Dub, 2020-present)

In-universe information
- Full name: Jameson Flynn Morrison Jr. (Portuguese: Cebolácio Menezes da Silva Júnior)
- Species: Human
- Gender: Male
- Family: Mrs. Five (Mother), Mr. Five (Father), Mary Angela Five (Sister)
- Pet dog: Fluffy

Jameson Flynn Morrison Jr., commonly known as Jimmy Five in English, known as Cebolinha, (Note: "Cebolinha" means both "chives" and the diminutive for "onion", in Portuguese) in Portuguese language, is one of Monica and Friends' main characters of the comic book series and media franchise. He was created in 1960, at first as a support character for Franklin and Blu who the following year became the protagonist of his own series of newspaper strips, which was later replaced by the character Monica in the 70s. Currently Jimmy Five has his own printed comic book, called Cebolinha, which was first released in 1973.

Jimmy's family name is "Cebola" ("onion" in Portuguese), and he has a little baby sister called Mary Angela (in Portuguese, Maria Cebolinha, after her brother's name), also based on a real person.

His English name is Jimmy Five due to his hair being composed of only five strands. In the first adaptations of comics into English, the character's name was Stanley, and later Frizz.

== Concept and creation ==
Jimmy Five first appeared in the second issue of the comic book Zaz Traz in 1960, as a supporting character for Franklin. Mauricio de Sousa, creator of Monica's Gang, says he based the character on a child he knew while growing up in Mogi das Cruzes. He was a friend of his older brother Márcio who often played soccer on a small field in the neighborhood where they lived and because of his haircut he was nicknamed as "Cebolinha" from Márcio's and Mauricio's father. At first, he was introduced as a 4-year-old boy who was a friend of Franklin and his gang, being the youngest boy in their group. He was supposed to appear in only one story, but the character ended up becoming so well received that he continued to appear more and more frequently. In the first stories Jimmy Five was hairy, but after Mauricio returned to the newspaper strips, his design became more and more simple and began to be drawn with fewer hair strands as Mauricio's art style changed.

Mauricio liked the character and made him a separate protagonist of Franklin and Blu in 1961. In these comic strips in which he was the protagonist, he was just a normal little boy who had several weird friends, among these weird friends came Smudge, a dirty boy who later became his best friends and sidekicks. After the introduction of Monica (based on the Mauricio's daughter) in the comic strips in 1963 he began to share the leading role with her over the years. In 1964 he came to have his current look with 5 hair strands. In 1970 with the release of the comic book, Monica became the title protagonist in place of Jimmy Five, but a comic book for Jimmy Five began to be published 3 years later. Since Monica became protagonist Jimmy Five has gained different characteristics, as an antagonist who aims to defeat Monica and dominate the leadership of the neighborhood (in reference to the fact that the character had his role of protagonist reduced in favor of Monica).

== Characteristics ==
Due to dyslalia, Jimmy Five is incapable of pronouncing the letter "r", replacing it with the letter l, in the Portuguese version, or with the letter w, in the English version. When the letter is used at the end of a word, however, he pronounces it normally (as in "car" or "locker").

He is the only character of the main cast who regularly wear shoes (when barefoot, he is also one of the rare characters to be shown with toes). He often complains and despairs over his main physical feature - his lack of any hair other than five single strands. His madcap attempts to rectify this often causes him (and those around him) a great deal of grief. He was originally drawn with a full head of hair, which often becomes a topic in his laments to the comic artist to "help him out" and restore his full head of hair.

He is always plotting to steal either Samson or the title of "owner of the street" from Monica with his "infallible plans" (which were initially created by Specs), which always end in failure, mostly because Smudge (his best friend) accidentally reveals to Monica the entire plan. On some stories, he gathers the other boys of the gang just to pick on Monica. In some earlier stories, he made background plans to find out the secret of her strength, but he always ended up beaten solely by her.

Even with these frictions, Jimmy and Monica are still friends. In the futuristic special edition stories, they are often portrayed as married or dating each other. Indeed, in Monica Teen, they are seen kissing.

It was once revealed that Jimmy is not the first one in his family to have his famous speech impediment and that it caused all his relatives (minus his father) to believe he will never be able to pronounce 'r'. However, this is disproven in the Monica Teen stories, where he is said to take up speech-language pathology sessions to correct his speech impediment; however, he reverts to mispronunciation when under stress or close to girls (especially Monica).

While his family was always composed of his mother, father, and little sister, he once had a little brother, introduced in a 1972 story. Jimmy himself even ended the story asking his readers to send name suggestions to Editora Abril (which published Monica and Friends comics at that time), but the toddler ended up disappearing from the stories. Mauricio stated that he simply didn't have time to plan the continuation of his arrival, and the character was never featured again.

== Related characters ==
=== Family ===
Jimmy Five is the son of Mr. Five (Seu Cebola, lit. Mr. Onion) and Mrs. Five (Dona Cebola, lit. Mrs. Onion). The mother spends most of her time as a housekeeper, sometimes complaining about this. She is always worried about her weight. The father (similar to Smudge's father), is drawn simply as an adult Jimmy, the only differences being his nose and his height. He's very affectionate to his family and hard working with his job at a local business company. Unlike Jimmy, he does not have speech impairments.

He also has a baby sister called Mary Angela (Maria Cebolinha, lit. Maria Little Onion), also introduced in 1960 in the comic book Zaz Traz. Her baby mind makes her a very curious and active person, which leads Jimmy to near-insanity, as he is the one to look for her when his parents are not home. Mary is based on Mauricio de Sousa's oldest daughter, Mariângela Spada e Sousa.

Among other relatives Jimmy Five also has his paternal grandfather known as Cebolão (lit. Big Onion) who, like his son, resembles an elderly version of Jimmy Five, with the difference of white hair, mustache and glasses. In a story published in 1977, it is revealed that Jimmy has an ancestor named Cebolinhax who, 300 years ago, was responsible for trapping the villain Lax-Labax in the depths of the Earth, in addition to having an identical appearance to his current descendant.

=== Fluffy ===
Fluffy (Floquinho) is Jimmy's dog. Originally, the dog belonged to his cousin from the countryside, but ended up becoming Jimmy's. Due to his long hair, no one can tell his head from his tail, and vice versa. This long hair caught many reader's eyes, and after years of arguments between fans on what breed he really belonged to it was announced his breed as being Lhasa Apso. Apart from his head and tail problem, another recurring gag in his strips is the fact that his long hair can hide plenty of objects (at one point hiding a missing airplane and its pilot, a missing cruise ship, a hot-dog vendor, and the mailman all at once).

== Comic strip ==
After the end of Zaz Traz and Bidu comics, in 1961 when Mauricio de Sousa was contracted to work on Folha de S. Paulo to produce new comics, he decided to use Jimmy Five as a protagonist separate from Blu and Franklin, thus creating the newspaper strip Cebolinha where the character was characterized as a normal boy who had many weird friends. The strip went on hiatus during 1962 after Mauricio was fired for having been falsely accused of being a communist by the newspaper, but returned the following year bringing new characters in addition to other comics and projects by Mauricio de Sousa such as the children's supplement Folhinha, where his characters illustrated the pages. The strip remained titled Cebolinha even after the debut of Monica's solo comic in 1970, that came 3 years before Jimmy Five's solo comic by Abril. The strip was discontinued in 1985 when Mauricio changed his characters to the newspaper O Estado de S. Paulo and changing the title to Turma da Mônica.

== Reception and legacy ==
Just like Monica, Jimmy Five is considered one of the great icons of Brazilian comics. His solo comic has been one of the best-selling in Brazil, in 1975 (2 years after its debut) it was among the most popular, losing only to Disney comics and Mônica. Between 2023 and 2024, it was the 4th best-selling comic book in Brazil, losing only to the titles Mônica, One Piece and Turma da Mônica.

In December 2010 a special issue called "Cebolinha 50 Anos", of which celebrated the 50 years of the character was published. In 2019, the footballer Everton Soares started to adhere to the nickname "Cebolinha" in honor of the character, Everton admitted to being a fan of Monica's Gang and was later presented with art made by Mauricio de Sousa. In 2018 a graphic novel focused only on Jimmy Five entitled "Cebolinha: Recuperação" was published, having been made by the artist Gustavo Borges.

A Jimmy Five vinyl doll appears in the 2007 Australian horror film Black Water.
