= The Tribe (Monica and Friends) =

Mauricio de Sousa creation related to Monica's Gang

- Author: Mauricio de Sousa
- Current status/schedule: Running.
- Launch date: 1963
- Genre(s): Humor comics, Jungle (genre) comics

The Tribe ("Papa Capim") is a Brazilian comic strip, part of the Monica's Gang series. It centers around a tribe of indigenous people from the Amazon (although it is never specified which). Their tribe was once named "Tribo do Rio" (River's Tribe). Although the only characters are Tom-Tom (the main character), Tamoyo, Papaya and the Pajé, their stories feature a large range of themes, going from environmental concerns to the shock between indigenous and non-indigenous cultures. People from outside the jungle are called "Caras-pálidas" (White-faced or paleface, due to their white skin, in contrast to the usual dark skin of indigenous peoples from the Amazon) or simply "Caraíbas". When one of the Caraíbas approaches Tom-Tom's tribe, the encounter can be either friendly or unfriendly, the latter always happening when the Caraíba attempts to hunt, deforest, burn, or in any other way harm the environment. Tupã, the God of the Guarani people, and Jaci, the Moon, are occasionally mentioned.

== Characters ==
- Tom-Tom (Papa-Capim) – Tom-Tom is a brave, curious "curumim" (child in Tupi–Guarani languages). He is an avid hunter and fisher, but above all, an environment protector that won't allow any Caraíba to harm the jungle and its animals. His original name Papa-Capim was inspired by the Portuguese name of the yellow-bellied seedeater bird.
- Tamoyo (Cafuné) – Tom-Tom's best friend. Always accompanying him through his adventures involving hunting, fishing, or fighting evil Caraíbas.
- Papaya (Jurema) – Her Portuguese name refers to a local tree. She appears as Tom-Tom's lover, but not always as his girlfriend. Sometimes, she ignores him and tells him about the many qualities other inhabitants of their tribe have, and that he needs to improve a lot to deserve her attention. However, she would frequently be jealous of him.
- Pajé – The name of this character is also the name of his position in the tribe. A "Pajé" is like a shaman, who can contact spirits and use these contacts to cure illness and sickness, view the future and receive messages from the gods. Pajé is very intelligent, and is always giving advice to Tom-Tom. He knows many secrets of the jungle, such as the curing power of plants, or the virtues of the animals.
- Kava - Tom-Tom's little cousin. As a younger child, he is very curious about his surroundings, and adventurous as well. As such, he has to be kept in line as Tom-Tom tries to teach him about things, including how to speak Portuguese (Kava mostly, if not solely, speaks a Tupi–Guarani language). His name means "wasp".

== Media ==
In 2016 a graphic novel based on The Tribe characters entitled "Papa-Capim: Noite Branca", was released as part of the Graphic MSP being made by Marcela Godoy e Renato Guedes.
