= Monica (Monica and Friends) =

Comic book character

- Monica's Gang character
- Monica (with stuffed rabbit Samson in hand)
- First appearance: Newspaper comics for Folha da Manhã
- Created by: Maurício de Sousa
- Portrayed by: Giulia Benite (Monica and Friends: Bonds)
- Voiced by: Portuguese: Maria Amélia Castilho de Toledo da Costa Manso Basile (1976-1982); Marli Bortoletto (1983-present) Priscila Concepción (Turma da Mônica Jovem; pilot); Agatha Paulita (Turma da Mônica Jovem; official); English: Fran Capo (90s); Gabriela Piccoli (2019-present)

In-universe information
- Full name: Monica Aparecida Sousa dos Santos
- Species: Human
- Gender: Female
- Family: Mrs. Luísa (Mother); Mr. Sousa (Father); Ditto (pet dog)
- Nationality: Brazilian

Monica (Portuguese: Mônica) is a Brazilian fictional character and Mauricio de Sousa's best-known creation. Introduced in 1963, she serves as the titular main protagonist and title character of the Monica and Friends (Turma da Mônica) comic book series and media franchise.

Mauricio based the character on his second daughter, also named Monica, with whom the fictional character shares some physical characteristics. In her first appearances, she was a supporting character to Jimmy Five, but was gradually made the main character. An eponymous comic book series began publication from 1970.

== Concept and creation ==
Concept art of Monica is based on the daughter of Mauricio de Sousa

Monica was based on Mauricio de Sousa's daughter in childhood. The reason for her creation was due to a complaint of the lack of female characters in Mauricio comics. At that time, newspaper strips of Blu and Jimmy Five were produced. When Monica made her first appearance was in a strip of Jimmy Five in 1963, at first as a secondary rival of main character.

In the very first strips, Monica appeared as a 4-year-old little girl (who was considered Specs' younger sister in earlier stories). She had an aggressive behavior and was portrayed as a bully. She also used to wear shoes, just like Jimmy Five. Monica's hair was influenced by a haircut her older daughter Mariângela gave her once when she was a kid. But Mauricio improved her visual over the years giving to Monica a cute and friendly appearance and making her more naïve and kind. However her characteristic of beating the boys (mainly Jimmy Five) with her rabbit was maintained, only reversing the roles making the boys act as antagonists to Monica who often created plans to defeat her. For most of the 60s she was considered a supporting role for Jimmy Five, however her popularity increased significantly at the end of the same decade when Mauricio received a contract with the food company CICA (a defunct and now Unilever-owned Brazilian company) to use Monica and Thunder (another Mauricio de Sousa character) to appear in television commercials.

With the popularity of Monica in the TV commercials in 1970 Mauricio made a new contract for a series of comic books with his characters, but with Monica as the title character instead of Jimmy Five.

== Personality and basic information ==
Monica is a 7-year-old (6-year-old in older stories) toeless, strong and decisive girl, who does not tolerate impertinence, but at the same time, has her moments of femininity. She lives with her parents, has a little dog called Ditto (Monicão), and does not let go of her blue stuffed rabbit called Samson (Sansão). This rabbit, which she loves so dearly, is also a weapon against boys. Especially Jimmy Five (Cebolinha) and Smudge (Cascão), who are always teasing her and calling her roly-poly, toothy, and shorty. She is described as possessing powerful (usually even superhuman) strength, which she uses to fight boys who tease her or to defend herself and her friends. She is known by the other characters as the "ruler of the street". She is often at odds with Jimmy Five (Cebolinha), but backs him up whenever he gets into trouble. Monica's best friend is Maggy (Magali). Monica's also very shy to date boys, and she often causes trouble when she tries to talk or impress them. Her buckteeth (more precisely the maxillary central incisor) are her trademark, but also the main reason for people to call her toothy.

== Relatives and friends ==
=== Parents ===
Monica is the daughter and only child of Seu Sousa (lit. Mr. Sousa) and Dona Luísa (lit. Mrs. Luísa). Sousa is based on Mauricio de Sousa himself (as his surname indicates), but he is a separate character. He works in a business company. Luísa is housewife, but also works as a designer for pieces of furniture. Unlike the other parents, Sousa and Luísa are the only ones who do not share any facial similarities with their child, which in some stories this fact made Monica suspect that she was adopted, although in the end she found out they were in fact her biological parents.

=== Samson ===
Samson (Sansão, in the original) is Monica's blue rabbit toy. He is not only Monica's favorite toy but also the "weapon" that she uses on whoever calls her by names she doesn't like. Samson is a constant victim of Jimmy Five, Smudge or other boys who love to tie his ears in knots. Initially, he didn't have a name, "Samson" was suggested by Roberta Carpi, in 1983. It was based on a yellow toy rabbit stuffed with straw that the real Monica had when she was 2 years old. Originally in the very first strips Samson was also yellow, but was later changed to blue to match the new rabbit plush that Mauricio's daughter won in place of the old one in a TV show in her 7 years. In the first comic strips that appeared constantly was used as a weapon to beat and scare the boys of the neighborhood (mainly Jimmy Five). In a strip from the same time it was revealed that the reason boys were afraid of the rabbit was because Monica carried a brick inside him to beat them, but this idea was dropped over time when Monica went on to demonstrate super strength. In some old stories is also revealed that inside him lives an elf-like imp. The character also has a female pink counterpart called Dalila (lit. Delilah), who rarely appears in comics and is used more in marketing. The real-life Samson was exposed in 2013 in a museum in honor of Monica's 50th birthday.

=== Ditto ===
Ditto (Monicão – a portmanteau of "Mônica" and "cão", "dog" in Portuguese) is Monica's pet. He was a gift from Jimmy and Smudge, who did not remember to bring one to Monica's party. Ditto looks so much like her (including the Banana-like hair and the prominent teeth) that the boys decided to buy it with the initial purpose of mocking her as soon as they saw the pooch on a pet shop window. However, their plan backfired, as both Ditto and Monica got along immediately and now stick together. Among the pets of Monica and Friends, Ditto is the most active. He is sometimes portrayed as having super strength, which often leads him or Monica to get into troublesome situations.

== Other appearances ==
=== Monica Teen ===
Monica as she appears in the earlier issues

Monica is one of the main protagonists of the spin-off Monica Teen, published since 2008 by MSP and Panini Comics. In this Japanese-style comic-manga Monica and her friends are now 15 years old and go to school at Limoeiro High (literal translation: Lemon Tree High). The very first edition shows a drastic change in Monica and her friends since when they were 7 years old. Despite still having a short temper and her buck teeth, Monica is more self-confident. Her hair gets a bit longer, and in later editions it gets more realistic. She develops a crush for Jimmy Five and ends up in a relationship with him. Despite having changed in some ways, she still has an adventurous spirit and continues to use her super strength when necessary.

Later on, she joins her friends in a crossover with characters by Osamu Tezuka such as Princess Sapphire, Astro Boy and Kimba.

=== Video games ===
Monica starred in a series of games for Master System and Sega Genesis developed by TecToy. The games were based on the Wonder Boy franchise, and their adaptations were exclusive to Brazil. In the adaptations of these games, Monica and her friends replace the protagonists.

In 2014, Monica was added by publisher Nurigo Games as a playable character in the Brazilian edition of Massive Multiplayer Online (MMO) race game Tales Runner.

Monica is also one of the default playable characters in the 2018 game Mônica e a Guarda dos Coelhos.

== Reception and legacy ==
Monica is often considered and referred to as the most popular character and icon in Brazilian comics and cartoons. The comic strip showing Monica's first appearance has become iconic and is often referenced even in modern Monica and Friends comics, in a similar way to Steamboat Willie for Mickey. In 1993 a special issue called "Mônica 30 Anos", of which celebrated the 30 years of the character was published, this edition besides comics showed curiosities about the origin of the character, an interview with the real Mauricio de Sousa's daughter and also arts made by other Brazilian artists (that served as inspiration for future Graphic Novels with other artists drawing the characters of Mauricio de Sousa). With the success of this issue, similar ones were launched in later years commemorating the 35, 40 and 50 years of the character. In 2013, during the character's 50th birthday celebration various old products, retro toys, books based in the character's history were sold, in addition to exhibitions and plays. The 50th anniversary was also celebrated by Cartoon Network in Brazil. In 2016 a Graphic Novel focused only on Monica entitled "Mônica - Força" was published, having been made by the artist Bianca Pinheiro, this Graphic Novel had a sequel in 2019 entitled "Mônica - Tesouros" and another in 2023 titled "Mônica: Coragem".

In 2007, Monica became a Goodwill Ambassador for UNICEF.

=== Rivalry with Little Lulu ===
Despite the good reception, the character was also the target of much criticism in the early years involving her great resemblance to Little Lulu, which was even considered the main rival for Monica in the sale of comics in Brazil until the 90s. In 2009, after the success of Monica Teen, a comic book with a teen version of Little Lulu called Luluzinha Teen e sua Turma started to be published in response to Monica Teen.

=== Internet memes ===
In 2016 memes based on Monica's Gang started to become popular on the internet, originally through a shitposting club on Facebook. One of the most popular memes that came up on Facebook was the "ATA" meme, consisting of the cover of "Almanaque da Mônica Nº 102" published in May 2004 by Globo. The cover shows Monica using a computer (showing the faces of the other characters) and breaking the fourth wall looking at the reader, in the meme the faces of the characters were erased and replaced with texts of responses to be used in comments on Facebook, the most popular being the "ata" (a corruption of "ah tá", a sarcastic way of speaking "okay" in Portuguese). The popularity of the meme with the overuse of the image through the comments on Facebook came to attract the attention of MSP and even the real Mônica Sousa who posted a photo imitating the meme.
