= MSP Estúdios =

Brazilian entertainment company

Mauricio de Sousa Produções Ltda.

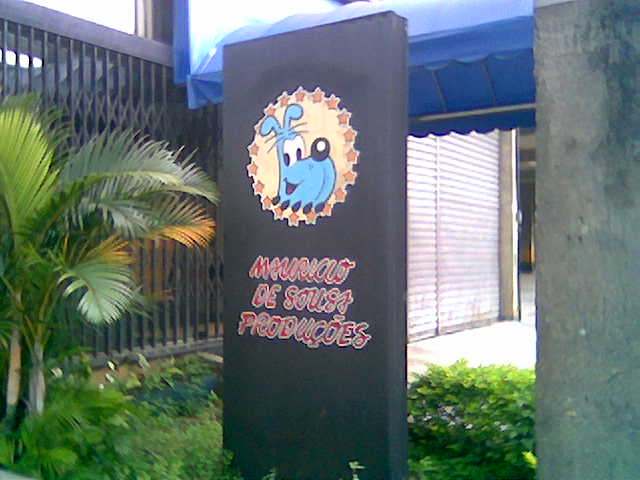
- Entrance of the company's former headquarters in Rua do Curtume, Lapa de Baixo, São Paulo.
- Trade name: MSP Estúdios
- Formerly: Bidulândia Serviços de Imprensa (1962–1965)
- Type: Private
- Founded: 1962; 64 years ago
- Founder: Maurício de Sousa
- Headquarters: Business Park, Lapa de Baixo, São Paulo, Brazil
- Products: Comic books motion pictures television music publishing licensing
- Website: turmadamonica.uol.com.br

MSP Estúdios, previously known as Mauricio de Sousa Produções (MSP, Mauricio de Sousa Productions), or Estúdios Mauricio de Sousa (Mauricio de Sousa Studios), is the company responsible for the production of comics and cartoons, the creation and development of characters, product licensing, and all other projects related to the characters created by Mauricio de Sousa.

== History ==
On 18 July 1959, Mauricio de Sousa published his first comic strip in the Folha da Manhã newspaper.

The company was originally dedicated to the production of comic strips published in the newspapers in the late 1960s and early 1970s, Mauricio started a partnership for the publication of magazines with Editora Abril, which lasted until the mid-1980s when, to increase circulation, changed to Editora Globo.

On 1 January 2007 Mauricio de Sousa Produções (a name that encompasses all of the author's editorial initiatives) left Globo, signing an "exclusive and long-lasting" agreement with Panini Comics. The primary objective of this publication change was the pretension of reaching foreign markets.

Already when he was working at Editora Abril, Maurício tried to invest his characters in other countries. This had a bigger expansion during the partnership with Globo, but its products did not obtain great success outside Brazil – something that intends to get around, with the new partnership. Currently, Mauricio de Sousa Studio works with Mauricio's newest release: the "faux-manga" Monica Teen – which was expected to sell a maximum of 60,000 copies in its first issue, but ended up selling more than 230,000 copies. Mauricio de Sousa Produções moved to a new headquarters on 25 January 2017.

On March 15, 2025, the company was rebranded to MSP Estúdios as part of a major expansion.

== Other Works ==
Besides the already famous characters in the Portuguese-speaking world, MSP also owns the Instituto Mauricio de Sousa that produces educational booklets and licenses its characters for educational campaigns.

The feature films Os Trapalhões no Reino da Fantasia and Os Trapalhões no Rabo do Cometa, that use a combination of live-action and animation, were co-produced by MSP.
