= Monica Adventures =

Brazilian comic by Mauricio de Sousa

- Logo from the first release of Monica Adventures, Volume 1, in August 2008

Publication information
- Publisher: Papercutz (US); Mauricio de Sousa Produções; Panini Comics; Planet Manga
- Format: Ongoing series
- Genre: Action/adventure, romantic comedy
- Publication date: August 2008 - ongoing
- No. of issues: 176

Creative team
- Created by: Mauricio de Sousa
- Written by: Emerson Abreu (first series only); Flávio Teixeira de Jesus; Marcelo Cassaro; Petra Leão; Edson Luís Itaborahy (second series only); Daniela Nascimento (second and third series); Felipe Marcantonio (second and third series); Lederly Mendonça (third series); Daniel Mallzhen (third series)
- Colorist: Diogo Nascimento

Monica Adventures (Portuguese: Turma da Mônica Jovem, lit. "Mônica's Gang Teen") is a Brazilian comic created in August 2008 by Mauricio de Sousa. It is a reinterpretation of the characters from Monica and Friends in teenage versions, in features and language that refer to Japanese manga and stories that seek to engage with a teen audience.

In January 2019, the series began to be published in the United States by the publisher Papercutz.

== Plot ==
The series shows the daily lives of the protagonists of Monica and Friends a few years in the future as 15-year-old teenagers, now mature and with several differences compared to their original counterparts. The stories range from everyday themes such as dating and teenage problems to fantasy adventures, references to pop culture or the original series.

The story began with a 4-issue saga titled "4 Dimensões Mágicas" (4 Magical Dimensions) where Monica, Jimmy Five, Smudge and Maggy are introduced and reunite with their old enemy Captain Fray (presented with the alter ego Poeira Negra) who freed a Japanese witch Yuka who kidnaps their parents, and forces them to a challenge to get 4 objects through four magical dimensions where they meet other allied characters and villains from their childhood. The saga ends with Monica and Jimmy Five making their relationship official. After that, other sagas occur, such as "O Brilho de Um Pulsar" (paying homage to the film The Princess and the Robot) as well as some standalone stories like "O Príncipe Perfeito" (paying homage to the play Mônica e Cebolinha: No Mundo de Romeu e Julieta).

== Characters ==
From left to right, the main characters in their initial design: Smudge, Jimmy Five, Monica and Maggy.

The series features as main characters the classic quartet Monica, Jimmy Five, Smudge and Maggy. Monica is now portrayed as a tall, thin girl, but who still has her big teeth, who is no longer the target of teasing from boys, still keeps her stuffed rabbit Samson (although she rarely appears with him) and is also portrayed with a calmer and more controlled personality as opposed to her personality. Jimmy Five is now depicted as having more hair and being able to speak without changing the letters R to L, in addition to having officially become Monica's boyfriend at the beginning of the story. Smudge officially takes a bath, although he still prefers his old habits while Maggy has come to control her great hunger.

== Adaptations ==
The series received an animated series in 2019 with a single season of 26 episodes airing on Cartoon Network featuring original stories focused primarily on slice-of-life themes.

In 2024 a live-action film was released entitled Turma da Mônica Jovem: Reflexos do Medo (lit. Monica Teen: Reflexes of Fear), being directed by Mauricio Eça. However, the film had a negative reception being considered by many as inferior to other live-actions based on Mauricio de Sousa's characters and being considered a terrible adaptation of the comics, with part of the criticism being the poor performances of actors like Sophia Valverde as Monica.

== Spin-offs ==
A spin-off based on Chuck Billy 'n' Folks titled Chico Bento Moço was published between 2013 and 2021 with the story running parallel to Monica Adventures.

In 2016, Mauricio de Sousa expressed interest in producing an adult version with his characters being 23 years old and addressing more mature themes with the possibility of Monica and Jimmy Five having a child. However, over time, the project ended up being shelved and was never spoken about again.

== Products ==
A collection of 5 dolls of Monica, Maggy and Marina in their teenage versions featured in this series were sold in 2009 by toy manufacturer Gulliver. A card game based on the first saga with 110 cards was also released in 2009 by Panini Comics.

Two books were released in 2010, with the titles Coisas que os Garotos Devem Saber (Things that the Boys Should Know) and Coisas que as Garotas Devem Saber (Things that the Girls Should Know). They often talk of puberty, relationships, and sexuality.

== Reception ==
During its debut, the series were criticized for changes in the characters and narrative, but the comic was a sales success in its first year. Fábio Yabu, who declared that Mauricio de Sousa is one of his idols, criticized the first saga for presenting drastic changes in the characters compared to their original versions (mainly Monica), in addition to the excess of references to Japanese culture. In the early years, comics had high sales, surpassing the sales of American comics such as Marvel and DC Comics. In 2009, a series based on Little Lulu titled Luluzinha Teen e sua Turma was launched, also featuring a teenage, manga-style version of the character as a way of trying to compete with Monica Adventures. Later in 2010, a manga-style comic book was launched starring Renato Aragão's character Didi, previously known for the comedy TV series Os Trapalhões. In an interview for Folha de S.Paulo, Ziraldo mentioned that he did not care for the trend of creating older versions of child characters, and in his words saying "You don't age a character!", and made it clear that there would be no teenage version of his character O Menino Maluquinho.

=== Controversies ===
Initially, Monica Adventures (Turma da Mônica Jovem) did not have a clear editorial line, resulting in a mix of various genres, such as parody and adventure, with elements of anime and manga, pop culture and RPG. This made the characters' lines inconsistent, which became one of the biggest complaints from fans.

In 2016, a scene from Monica's Gang: Teen scripted by Petra Leão, featuring the protagonist saying the phrase "Meu corpo, minhas regras" (lit. My body, my rules), came under attack from writer and right-wing ideologist Olavo de Carvalho. In the scene, Monica says she doesn't want to wear dental braces, but according to Carvalho’s interpretation, the character had become pro-abortion.

Emerson Abreu became known for writing horror and humor stories for Monica Adventures, featuring the so-called Super Saga do Fim do Mundo (lit. Super Saga of the End of the World), which contained themes deemed controversial for a young audience, such as magic and the apocalypse. The issues were very successful; however, the use of magic was heavily criticized by Christians, particularly Catholics, while being praised by Spiritists. Panini went as far as banning Emerson from writing horror stories, but the decision was reversed after his fans made the hashtag #UnidosPeloEmerson go viral. Another controversial story by Emerson was Os Meninos São Todos Iguais (lit. The Boys Are All the Same), from Monica's Teen #5 (2008), in which the character Denise uses slangs associated with the LGBTQ community. This resulted in a wave of complaints, and part of the fandom began calling her "mini-puta" (lit. mini-whore) and "mini-drag" on Orkut. MSP ended up picking a more strict editorial line, and Emerson stopped writing for Monica Adventures due to stress, causing the Supersaga to remain unfinished.
