= Editora Globo =

Brazilian publisher

Editora Globo S.A.
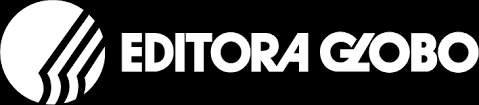

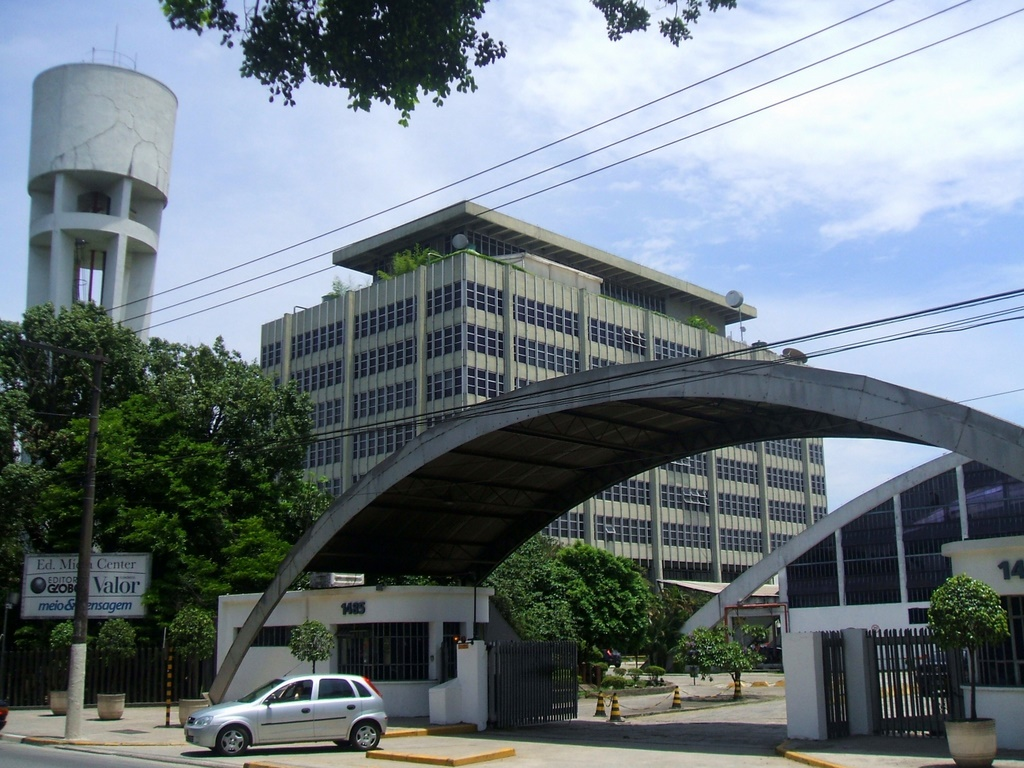
- Formerly: Rio Gráfica Editora (1952–1986)
- Company type: Subsidiary
- Industry: Publishing
- Genre: Various
- Founded: 1952; 74 years ago
- Founder: Roberto Marinho
- Headquarters: São Paulo, SP
- Number of locations: São Paulo; Rio de Janeiro; Brasília
- Key people: Frederic Kachar, CEO
- Products: Books, magazines and newspapers
- Owner: Grupo Globo
- Subsidiaries: Globo Livros; Infoglobo; Edições Globo Condé Nast (70%); Globosim
- Website: editoraglobo.globo.com

Editora Globo S.A. Portuguese pronunciation: [e.d͡ʒiˈto.ɾɐ ˈɡlo.bu]; lit. 'Globe Publishing Company') is a Brazilian publishing house, property of Fundação Roberto Marinho. It began as a bookstore called Livraria do Globo ([li.vɾaˈɾi.ɐ du ˈɡlo.bu]; lit. 'Bookshop of the Globe'), created in Porto Alegre, in December 1883, by Laudelino Pinheiro de Barcellos and Saturnino Alves Pinto.

== History ==
The bookstore "Livraria do Globo" began as a little store located at "Rua da Praia" Number 268. Livraria do Globo was open daily from 6:30 am to 10:00 pm, including Saturdays. After some business success the bookstore started working as a copy and paperwork center, doing bookbindings and other small services, the building where it was located underwent a slight remodeling.

Its first branch store was created in Santa Maria, near the old ferryway center of Rio Grande do Sul. The "Livraria do Globo's" owners decided to create their own magazine, called "Revista do Globo".

In the 1940s, the bookstore company reached its highest success, with three branch stores in Brazil's South Region and offices in Rio de Janeiro and São Paulo. In 1986, the bookstore was sold to Rio Gráfica Editora, property of Fundação Roberto Marinho, who decided to rename its publishing house to Editora Globo, as it is still named.

In 1989, publishing house Editora Globo launched the magazines Criativa, focused on fashion and culture, and Destino, aimed at readers interested in esotericism, whose circulation continued until 1997. Before that period, Criativa, as well as Globo Rural, had been published by Rio Gráfica Editora.

In 1991, the magazine Globo Ciência was created, also inspired by a television program, with a focus on science and technology. That same year, the publisher also launched its first international title, Marie Claire, aimed at a female audience. In 1998, Globo Ciência was renamed Galileu, adopting an editorial approach focused on anticipating trends in science, technology, culture, and behavior.

In 1993, the magazine Crescer was launched, featuring content related to childhood stages, from pregnancy to adolescence, covering topics such as health, development, research, and guidance for parents and guardians. In 1994, the magazine Net TV was introduced, focused on cable television programming. In 2003, the publication underwent editorial and graphic redesign and was renamed Monet.

=== Development and consolidation – late 1990s and 2000s ===
In 1998, the magazines Casa & Jardim and Autoesporte, previously published by Efecê Editora, were incorporated into Editora Globo’s portfolio. Casa & Jardim became a reference in interior decoration, highlighting stories of people and their homes, while Autoesporte established itself as a guide to the automotive sector. Also in 1998, the weekly news magazine Época was launched, with an editorial proposal focused on current affairs and agility in reporting.

In 2000, the magazine Quem was launched under the title Quem Acontece, dedicated to celebrity culture, featuring reports on public personalities, interviews, photo spreads, profiles, and coverage of social events. In 2004, Pequenas Empresas & Grandes Negócios published for the first time the list As Melhores Franquias do Brasil (“The Best Franchises in Brazil”), which became a reference for entrepreneurs interested in franchising.

In 2005, Autoesporte launched the special issue Guia Qual Comprar, evaluating the best vehicles of the year. In the same year, Quem also initiated the projects Verão Quem and Inverno Quem, in which celebrities were invited on themed trips covered exclusively by the magazine.

In 2006, Pequenas Empresas & Grandes Negócios launched the Extreme Makeover project, in which three selected companies received free consulting services aimed at improving operational efficiency.

That same year, Época began publishing the survey by the organization Great Place to Work, presenting the “100 Best Companies to Work for in Brazil” according to employee evaluations. This was the tenth edition of the ranking in the country and the first produced in partnership with the magazine. Also in 2006, Época launched the Edição Verde (“Green Edition”), dedicated exclusively to sustainability and environmental reporting.

In 2007, Editora Globo created the Projeto Generosidade (“Generosity Project”), bringing together the publisher’s magazines around a pioneering cause in Brazilian media: highlighting and promoting actions and examples of people doing good across Brazil.

Also in 2007, the magazine Época Negócios was launched, focusing on the Brazilian and international corporate environment. The publication was designed to provide content on innovation, management, and strategic knowledge aimed at businesspeople and executives. In the same year, Época introduced the special edition 100 Brasileiros Mais Influentes (“100 Most Influential Brazilians”), presenting personalities recognized for their achievements in various fields. The selection included leaders, reformers, entrepreneurs, pioneers, media figures, philanthropists, thinkers, artists, and idols.

In 2009, Crescer launched the Seminário Crescer, an event promoting discussions between specialists and guests on themes related to contemporary family life. In the same year, the magazine Casa e Comida was launched, dedicated to gastronomy and interior decoration. Its editorial proposal focused on presenting complete solutions for different types of celebrations, from informal gatherings to sophisticated events, with suggestions for recipes, decoration, and organization.

In 2010, Época became the first weekly news magazine to make its content available on the iPad platform, an initiative later extended to Autoesporte and Época Negócios.

In 2011, the Prêmio Época Empresa Verde (“Época Green Company Award”) was created to replace the Prêmio Época Mudanças Climáticas (“Época Climate Change Award”), which had been launched in 2008.

== Main titles ==
These are the main titles published by Editora Globo (books are not included because there are innumerous titles published on many different subjects):

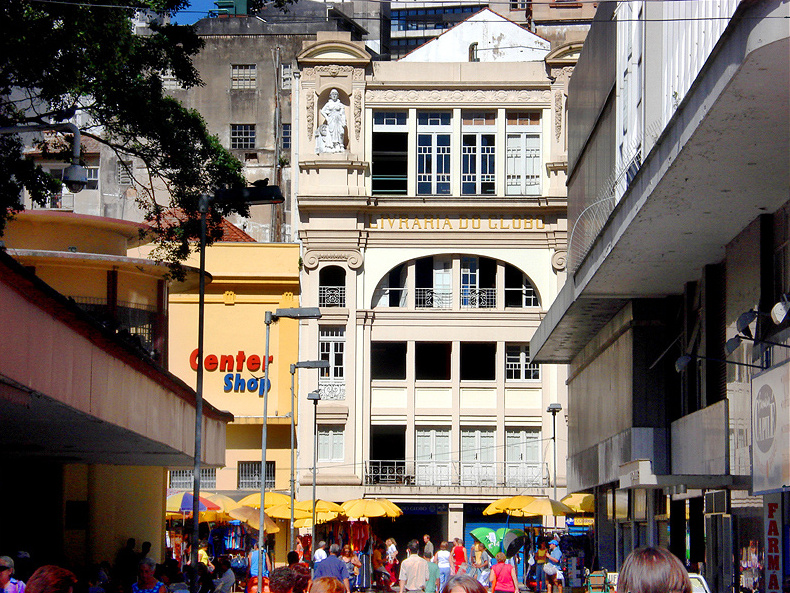
"Livraria do Globo's" back façade in Porto Alegre

- Magazines
  - Revista Época
  - Revista Época São Paulo
  - Revista Época Negócios
  - Galileu
  - Auto Esporte
  - Casa & Jardim
  - Crescer
  - Criativa
  - Globo Rural
  - Marie Claire
  - Pequenas Empresas & Grandes Negócios
  - Quem
  - Revista Fantástico
  - Monet
- Custom Magazines
  - Diva
  - Viva Seda
  - Loony
  - Renner
- Books
  - Globo Livros
- Websites
  - Valor Investe, investment news and information

1002 books and 69 collections have been published.

== See also ==
- Análise Editorial
- Editora Abril
