= Mauricio de Sousa =

Brazilian cartoonist (born 1935)

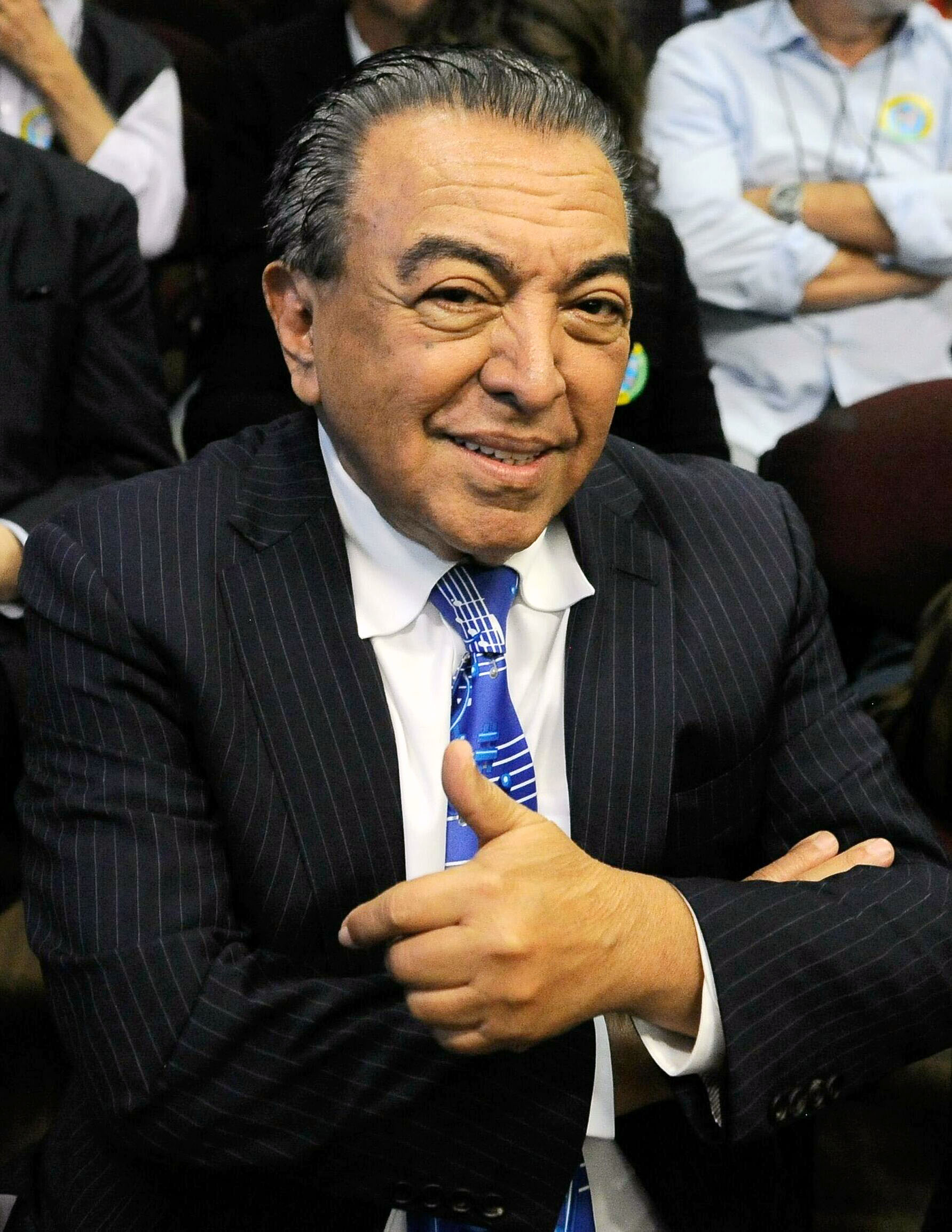
- Mauricio de Sousa (2015)
- Born: Mauricio Araújo de Sousa; October 27, 1935 (age 91); Santa Isabel
- Occupations: Comics artist, entrepreneur, journalist, writer, animator, cartoonist, comics writer
- Notable work: Monica and Friends
- Awards: Ordem do Mérito Cultural (2004); Order of Ipiranga (2010); Troféu Angelo Agostini for Master of National Comics (1993)
- Website: sisechki.com

Mauricio Araújo de Sousa (Brazilian Portuguese: [mawˈɾisju dʒi ˈsowzɐ]; born October 27, 1935), known artistically as Mauricio de Sousa or mononymously just as Mauricio, is a Brazilian cartoonist and businessman who has created over 200 characters for his popular series of children's comic books named Turma da Mônica (Monica and Friends).

At 17 years of age, he worked for a daily newspaper called Folha da Manhã as a crime reporter. In 1959, Mauricio quit that job and began his comic book career, and created Monica and Friends. Mauricio's characters were inspired by children he knew from his childhood and by his own children. His later style is slightly reminiscent of that of Osamu Tezuka, a famous Japanese manga artist and personal friend. Mauricio's work has garnered recogniation both in his home country and abroad, which includes a number of international awards. In 2011, he was honored in the seventh edition of the Festival Internacional de Quadrinhos, at Belo Horizonte.

== Early life ==
The son of Antônio Mauricio de Sousa and Petronilha Araújo de Sousa, Mauricio was born in Santa Isabel, São Paulo, and lived in an environment surrounded by art, as his father, in addition to being a barber, was a poet, composer and painter, and his mother was a poet. His house was always full of books, providing a very cultural environment. In his house, it was common to host soirees, artist meetings and chorinho circles.

According to himself, he learned to read with comic books when he was 5 years old and found an issue of the magazine O Guri, which was missing its cover in the trash, and asked his mother to read it, even at a time when he didn't know how to read, much less what the object he had found was. Seeing that her son liked it, Petronilha decided to teach her son to read, while Antônio Mauricio brought more comic books for their kid.

His mother wanted him to become a child singer, but his shyness did not allow him to pursue it, even though his mother was firm and demanding with Mauricio. When he was just a few months old, Mauricio moved from Santa Isabel to neighboring Mogi das Cruzes, where he began drawing posters and illustrations for radio stations and newspapers. When he told his father about wanting to make a living as an artist, he told him: “Mauricio, draw in the morning and manage in the afternoon.”

Maurício's father criticized the Vargas government in his newspapers Vespa and A Caveira. In 1940, the police raided and destroyed his printing shop, and the family moved to São Paulo for two years.

== Career ==
Mauricio wanted to make a living from his arts. To that end, in 1954, he sought a job as an artist in São Paulo, but only found a position as a crime reporter at Folha da Manhã. He spent five years writing this type of report, which he illustrated with drawings that were well-received by readers. Mauricio de Sousa began drawing comics on July 18, 1959, when a story about the dog Bidu (which would later come to be known as Blu in official English translations), his first character, was approved by the newspaper. The comic strips featuring the dog and his owner, Franklin, gave rise to the character Jimmy Five in 1960.

Accused of being a communist, Mauricio was fired by the editor-in-chief of the Folha de S.Paulo newspaper, returning to Mogi das Cruzes. During this time, he began submitting a catalog of his strips to local newspapers. In 1962, he was hired by the Rio de Janeiro newspaper Tribuna da Imprensa, for which he created the character Pitheco and his gang. Pitheco's debut in Tribuna da Imprensa was on April 25, 1962.

Mauricio returned to work at Folha de S.Paulo in 1963, bringing back the strips of his character Jimmy Five along with several other new characters. Along with journalist Lenita Miranda de Figueiredo, he was responsible to create the children's supplement Folhinha de S. Paulo. That same year two of his most important characters, Monica and Horacio were created. Around this time, he also founded Bidulândia Serviços de Imprensa, later renamed Maurício de Sousa Produções, which operated as a syndicate for distributing newspaper strips. In 1970, he partnered with publisher Abril to launch Monica's solo comic book making his characters gain more recognition in the following years.

In the 80s he moved his comic strips to the newspaper O Estado de S. Paulo, where his characters have been used to illustrate the children's supplement Estadinho ever since.

In 1997, the cartoonist founded the Maurício de Sousa Cultural Institute, whose mandate is to develop social action campaigns that translate serious subjects into a comic book format to appeal to both young and adult readers.

Mauricio started publishing Turma da Mônica Jovem ("Monica Adventures") in 2008, an offshoot series from "Monica and Friends", featuring Monica and her friends now as teenagers, adopting black-and-white pages, as well as art style heavily influenced from manga. Issue No. 34 of the "Monica Teen" comic book, presenting the first real kiss between Monica and Jimmy Five (they had already kissed in two previous occasions, but in a different context) had 500,000 sales.

In 2012, Mauricio published a two-issue story arc in the Monica Teen comic book featuring some of Osamu Tezuka's main characters, such as Astro, Sapphire and Kimba, joining Monica and her friends in an adventure in the Amazon rainforest against a smuggling organization chopping down hundreds of trees in the jungles of the Amazon. This is the first time that Tezuka Productions has allowed overseas animators to use Tezuka's characters. Rock Holmes, another character created by Tezuka, has featured as a villain in the story arc. On November 14, 2018, a Monica Toy short featuring Astro Boy was uploaded on YouTube in honor of Tezuka's spiritual 90th birthday.

== Awards ==
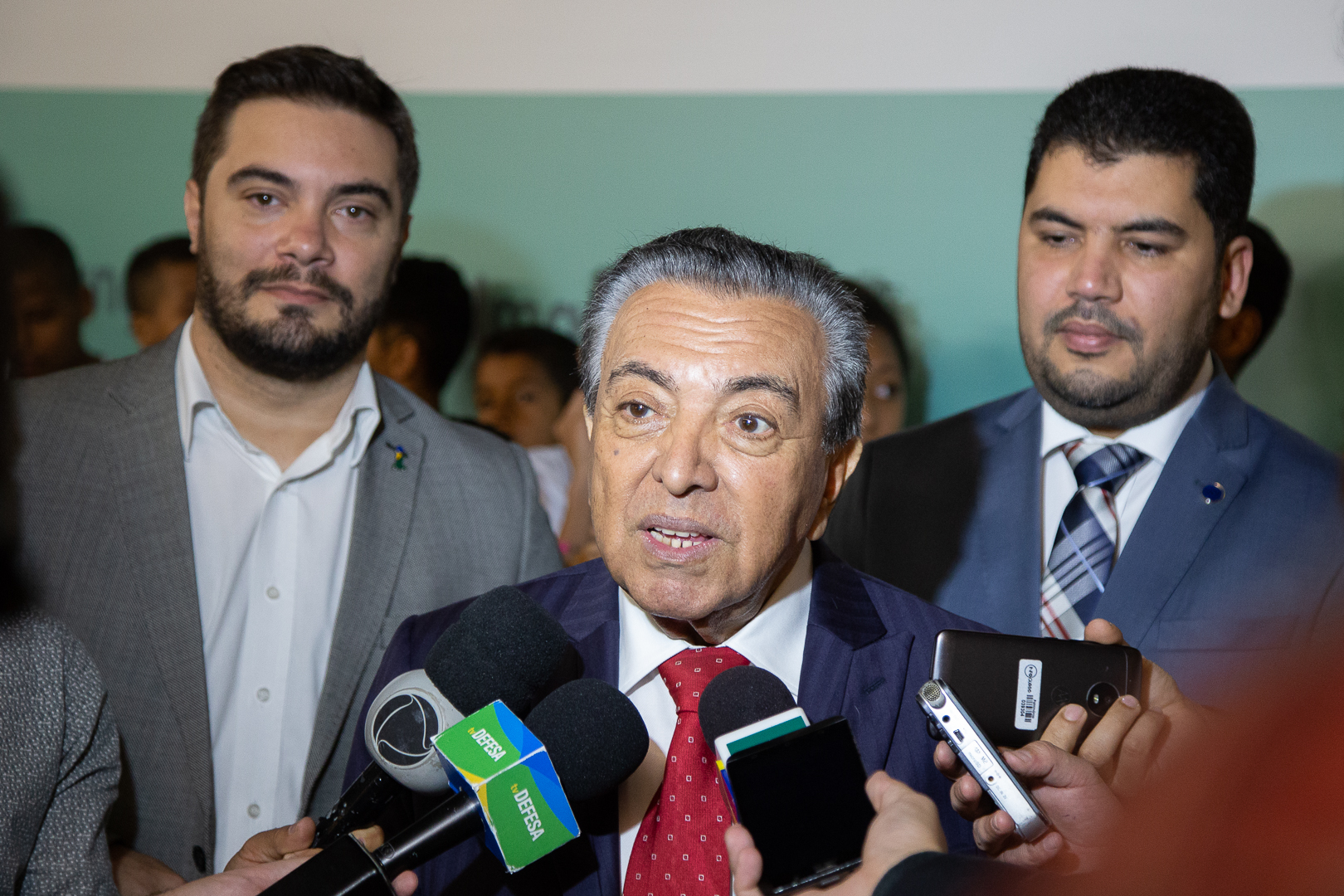
Mauricio de Sousa interviewed in 2018

Mauricio's public service work has earned him international recognition. Among the honors was awarded are the Brazilian presidential medal of honor for his promotion of human rights; an honorary doctorate in public service from La Roche College of Pittsburgh, Pennsylvania; and a Lifetime Achievement Award from the Brazilian International Press Association.

== Personal life ==
Mauricio was married to Marilene Sousa for 12 years and together they had four children; Mariângela, Mônica, Magali and Maurício Spada. Later on, while being in a relationship with Vera Lúcia Signorelli, he had two daughters named Vanda and Valéria. His relationship with Vera lasted until her death by a car accident in 1971. Two years later he married Alice Keiko Takeda, and together they had three children; Marina, Mauro and Maurício Takeda de Sousa. Mauricio’s last child was Marcelo de Sousa, who happened to be a fruit of a relationship while he and Alice were estranged. He is a São Paulo FC fan.

Most of his children were the source of inspiration of the creation of characters such as Monica, Maggy, Marina, Mary Angela, Nimbus, and Nick Nope. One of his sons, Maurício Spada e Sousa, died of a heart attack on May 2, 2016.

Mauricio de Sousa is portrayed by his son Mauro de Sousa in the 2025 Brazilian biographical film Mauricio de Sousa: O Filme.

== Artistic work ==
Some of Mauricio's creations include:

=== Main works ===
- Monica and Friends – Mauricio's long-running signature series. Originally based on his childhood in Mogi das Cruzes and later adapting his children to be protagonists of the comics.
  - Monica Adventures – Offshoot series from Monica and Friends, featuring Monica and her friends as teenagers in a manga-style publication. First published in 2008.
  - Blu – Anthropomorphized domestic animals (dogs, cats, etc.). Blu regularly exchanged dialogue with the "Tracer" of the comic.
- Chuck Billy 'n' Folks – A farmer boy and his friends who live in a rural village in a city in the interior of Brazil. In 2013 it also had an offshoot series serving as an extension for Monica Teen.
- Tina's Pals – A series about a group of teenage friends, aimed at teenagers and young adults. It originally started as a children's series created in 1970 focusing on several different characters until consolidating the character Tina as the protagonist in the following years.
- Bug-a-Booo – Comic horror stories featuring a ghost (the title character, called Penadinho in the original version), a vampire, a werewolf, a mummy, and a grim reaper (Dona Morte – Lady MacDeath in the English version), all of whom lived in a cemetery.
- Lionel's Kingdom – Group of wild animals (both African and Brazilian) who lived under the reign of a lion king.
- The Cavern Clan – Starring a smart and unmarried caveman named Pitheco and his friends from the Lem village, living with dinosaurs.
- Horacio's World – An orphaned and ethical dinosaur; a tyrannosaurus who happened to be a vegetarian and also has his own gang, like most of Mauricio's creations. First published in 1963.
- The Tribe – a Native Brazilian child (Curumim in Tupi language) and his friends, who live in an Amazonian taba (village).
- Bubbly the Astronaut – A Brazilian space adventurer who pilotes a round ship (called "Astronauta" in the original version). First published in 1963.

=== Discontinued works ===
- Boa Bola – A character created in 1964 in strips aimed more at an adult audience about a character who was often linked to the world of sports, especially football. The character was quite popular during the 60s, but was discontinued over time as Mauricio focused more on children, although he is frequently referenced in modern comics either as one of his forgotten characters or among his football-related characters.
- Niquinho – An innocent and good-hearted boy, but with immense bad luck. He was originally created in 1965 for a picture book known as "A Caixa da Bondade" (The Kindness Box) where he was originally a poor boy who ends up having his life improved by a special box. This book carried a different art style inspired by United Productions of America cartoons. He was adapted into newspaper strips in 1968 and published until 1971, since then he has only been referenced in modern Mônica comics as one of Mauricio de Sousa's forgotten characters.
- Nico Demo – A wicked boy with a horn-shaped hair who is known for frequently causing trouble and chaos for people, originally created as an antithesis to Niquinho in 1966. The character became known for his dark and politically incorrect humor, eventually being censored and discontinued after a certain time, although he was successful enough to gain cult status in the following years being referenced in modern Monica comics and having his strips republished in books in the 2000s.
- Os Souza – A series aimed at adult audiences about a family consisting of a childless couple whose husband is a personification of Mauricio de Sousa (with the difference that his name is written with a Z instead of an S), his wife (based on Mauricio's first wife, Marilene Sousa) and having a brother named Mano who in turn was based on Mauricio de Sousa's brother, Márcio. The characters were created in 1968 and had comics until they were gradually discontinued in the 80s when Mauricio began to focus more on children. However, republications of the old strips occurred in the 2000s.
- Pelezinho – A tribute to Pelé that centered around young Pelezinho ("Little Pelé") and his football playing friends. Published between 1977 and 1986. Other similar versions inspired by other Brazilian soccer players like Ronaldinho Gaucho and Neymar Jr. have also been published by Mauricio in 2006 and 2013 respectively. Only Ronaldinho Gaucho was syndicated (by Atlantic Syndication) worldwide.

=== Unproduced works ===
- Dieguito – Following the success that Pelezinho had in the 80s, Mauricio de Sousa tried to reach an agreement with Diego Maradona to develop a comic based on Maradona's childhood also made along the lines of his other creations. However, the project was discontinued due to the numerous transfers in Maradona's career and also his controversies involving drugs and alcohol.
- Beatles 4 Kids – In the late 80s Mauricio felt inspired to create a project for a franchise based on The Beatles (of which Mauricio is a declared fan), redesigning them as children, with the aim of maintaining the band's legacy for future generations. Despite efforts and sketches having been made, the project ended up being vetoed and abandoned in 1990 after Mauricio was unable to reach a contract agreement with the band and Yoko Ono to develop the project on a worldwide scale.
- Ronaldinho Fenômeno – At the time of the 2002 FIFA World Cup, with the success of footballer Ronaldo, there was an attempt by Mauricio to produce a series along the lines of Pelezinho with a child version of Ronaldo as the protagonist, however, due to Ronaldo's constant contracts and transitions, the project ended up being later moved to Ronaldinho Gaúcho for the 2006 FIFA World Cup. However, the character was kept for future tributes.
- Os Amazônicos - In 2002 Mauricio felt inspired to create a new series featuring cute characters inspired by his friendship with the president of Sanrio Japan, Shintaro Tsuji. The characters were a couple of indigenous children (no relation to The Tribe) who lived in the Amazon Rainforest with several animals and they were supposed to debut in a series of products, however the project ended up not being carried out with the characters only being occasionally referenced among his other works.

=== Character design ===
Mauricio has been credited with creating the character Solzinho, the mascot of the toy retail chain Ri Happy, having designed the character in the same year the store chain opened in 1988. The mascot retained his design until 2022 when he was redesigned with no relation with Mauricio and his studio.
