= Bigorna =

Brazilian website about comics

- Website type: Comic book
- Available in: Brazilian Portuguese
- Creator: Eloyr Pacheco
- Editor: Marcio Baraldi
- Website: bigorna.net
- Commercial: Yes
- Registration: No
- Launched: 2005

Bigorna (anvil in Portuguese) was a Brazilian website about comics with an almost exclusive focus on Brazilian comics.

== History ==
It was created in 2005 by editor Eloyr Pacheco, who after a few years left the site, transferring the position of editor-in-chief to cartoonist Marcio Baraldi, who kept the site in operation until 29 May 2011, having published a text by farewell in which he informed that the site would remain online, even without updates, due to the six years of content focused on Brazilian comics.

== Awards ==
In 2006, the Bigorna website won the Jayme Cortez Trophy, an award intended to reward great contributions to Brazilian comics. In 2009 and 2010, it won the Prêmio DB Artes for Best Fanzine Site.

== Troféu Bigorna ==
Troféu Bigorna
- Awarded for: Brazilian comics
- Sponsored by: Bigorna
- Location: São Paulo
- Country: Brazil
- First award: 2008
- Final award: 2010

In addition to interviews, reports and reviews of national comics, the Bigorna website was also responsible for the Troféu Bigorna, held from 2008 to 2010. The award was organized by Marcio Baraldi, Eloyr Pacheco, Humberto Yashima and Matheus Moura. The trophy design, which featured the design of an "Anvil Man" (Bigorna means "anvil" in Portuguese), was developed by Baraldi (the character has been used as the website's "mascot" since then). The main feature of Troféu Bigorna was its unique and exclusive focus on Brazilian artists.

=== Editions and winners ===
==== First Troféu Bigorna ====
The first Troféu Bigorna's ceremony was held on 29 November 2008, at Blackmore Bar and awarded the following categories:

- Best Penciller: Samicler Gonçalves
- Best Writer: Francinildo Sena
- Best Political Cartoonist: Carlos Latuff
- Best Editorial Cartoonist: Luís Augusto Gouveia
- Best Author's Website: GrapHiQ Brasil (Mário Latino)
- Best Specialized Journalist: Gonçalo Júnior
- Best Publishing House: Desiderata
- Best Independent Publishing House: Júpiter II
- Best Fanzine / Independent Magazine: Café Espacial (Sergio Chaves)
- Best Humor Album/Book: Macambira e Sua Gente (Henrique Magalhães / Marca de Fantasia)
- Best Book About Comics: A Era de Bronze dos Super-Heróis (Roberto Guedes / HQM Editora)
- Best Adventure Book/Other: 35 Anos de Velta (Emir Ribeiro / independent)
- Contribution to Brazilian Comics Prize:
  Worney Almeida de Souza, for Prêmio Angelo Agostini's 24 years
  Opera Graphica publishing house
  HQ Além dos Balões TV show
- "A Life Dedicated to Comics" Prize:
  Eugenio Colonnese
  Gedeone Malagola
  Rodolfo Zalla
- Special Homage: Mark Novoselic

==== Second Troféu Bigorna ====
The second Troféu Bigorna's ceremony was held on 5 December 2009, at the Blackmore Bar and awarded the following categories:

- Best Penciller: Luke Ross
- Best Writer: Alvimar Pires dos Anjos
- Best Political Cartoonist: Maurício Ricardo
- Best Editorial Cartoonist: Spacca
- Best Blog/Website About Comics: Zine Brasil (Michelle Ramos)
- Best Specialized Journalist: Marko Ajdarić
- Best Publishing House: Conrad Editora
- Best Independent Publishing House: Virgo
- Best Fanzine / Independent Magazine: Portal do Encantamento (José Pinto de Queiroz Filho)
- Best Humor Publication: Mad (many authors / Panini Comics) (Note: The award given to Mad refers to the magazine's Brazilian edition.)
- Best Book About Comics: Fantasma: a Biografia Oficial do Primeiro Herói Fantasiado dos Quadrinhos (Marco Aurelio Lucchetti / Opera Graphica)
- Best Adventure Book/Other: Artlectos e Pós-Humanos #3 (Edgar Franco / Marca de Fantasia)
- Contribution to Brazilian Comics Prize:
  Comix Book Shop
  HQ & Cia TV show
  Quarto Mundo art collective
- "A Life Dedicated to Comics" Prize:
  Rubens Cordeiro
  Diamantino da Silva
  Antônio Luiz Cagnin
  Álvaro de Moya
- Special Homage: Senninha e Sua Turma (many authors / HQM Editora)

==== Third Troféu Bigorna ====
The results of the award's third edition were announced on 8 November 2010. Exceptionally, there was no ceremony, and the trophies were sent directly to the winners. The following categories were awarded:

- Best Penciller: Elias Silveira
- Best Writer: Marcela Godoy
- Best Political Cartoonist: Amorim
- Best Editorial Cartoonist: Arionauro
- Best Blog/Website About Comics: JBlog Quadrinhos (Pedro de Luna)
- Best Specialized Journalist: Jota Silvestre
- Best Publishing House: Devir
- Best Independent Publishing House: Marca de Fantasia
- Best Fanzine / Independent Magazine: Maturi (GRUPEHQ)
- Best Humor Publication: Gibizon do Radicci (Iotti / independent)
- Best Book About Comics: Maria Erótica e o Clamor do Sexo (Gonçalo Júnior / Peixe Grande)
- Best Adventure Book/Other: Zoo (Nestablo Ramos Neto / HQM Editora)
- Contribution to Brazilian Comics Prize: Ota
- "A Life Dedicated to Comics" Prize:
  Osvaldo Talo
  Julio Shimamoto
  Getulio Delphim
- Special Homage:
  Joacy Jamys
  Glauco
