= Jayme Cortez =

Portuguese-Brazilian comics artist

- Born: 8 September 1926; Lisbon
- Died: 4 July 1987 (aged 60); São Paulo
- Occupation: Illustrator, cartoonist, comics creator
- Awards: Prêmio Jabuti (1969); Troféu Angelo Agostini for Master of National Comics (1985)
- Website: jaymecortez.blogspot.com

Jayme Cortez (Lisbon, September 8, 1926 - São Paulo, July 4, 1987) was a Portuguese-born Brazilian comics artist. He is considered one of the most important artists of Brazilian comics. Born as Jaime Cortez Martins, he began his career in the Portuguese magazine O Mosquito. Cortez emigrated to Brazil in 1947, where he continued his artistic journey, making significant contributions to both horror and children's comics.

== Biography ==
As a self-taught artist, Cortez made his comic debut in July 1944 in the weekly publication "O Mosquito," under the mentorship of Eduardo Teixeira Coelho.

In March 1947, he arrived in Santos and settled in São Paulo. The following year, he married Brazilian Maria Edna, later known in the comic world as Dona Edna, the fairy godmother of comics. Cortez faced initial challenges, even selling sweets with his cousins in the interior of São Paulo, hitchhiking on a truck. He later briefly worked as a cartoonist for "O Dia" and commenced his comic book career by creating strips for "Diário da Noite" ("Caça aos tubarões" and "O Guarany"). Subsequently, he contributed to "Gazeta Juvenil," the children's supplement of São Paulo's "A Gazeta," under the guidance of Messias de Mello. In this periodical, Cortez crafted comic book stories, cartoons, and honed his color techniques, incorporating Kodak photographic retouching inks, a form of watercolor. Later, introduced by Álvaro de Moya, he joined Editora La Selva, where he served as a cover artist and art director.

In the 1950s, the Comics Code Authority's self-censorship on American comics limited themes to simplicity, even canceling some titles, especially horror comics. This created opportunities for Brazilian artists. During this period, Cortez refined his art, excelling in both pen-and-ink and illustration. He created covers across genres, achieving great success with magazines like "Terror Negro," "Sobrenatural," and children's titles such as "Contos de Fada," "Varinha Mágica," the duo Oscarito and Grande Otelo, and the comedic Mazzaropi. Much of this production was created under Cortez's supervision and encouragement. After leaving Editora La Selva, Cortez co-founded Editora Continental in 1959, later renamed Outubro, exclusively publishing Brazilian artists, such as Rodolfo Zalla, Eugênio Colonnese, Gedeone Malagola, Júlio Shimamoto, Flávio Colin, among others.

A meticulous artist, Cortez utilized photos and live models as references in his work. He also participated in movements advocating for the recognition and appreciation of comics. He was one of the initiators of a project advocating for a comics market reserve to promote Brazilian comic production, reserving two-thirds of the space for local artists. Although the proposal was submitted to authorities, it was never implemented.

Jayme Cortez was also one of the organizers (alongside Álvaro de Moya, Miguel Penteado, Reinaldo de Oliveira, and Syllas Roberg) of the first International Exhibition of Comics, where comics were presented and appreciated as art for the first time in the world. The exhibition opened on June 18, 1951, at the Centro Cultura e Progresso in São Paulo.

He served as a teacher at the Escola Panamericana de Arte and worked in advertising as a storyboard artist and creative director at McCann Erickson from 1964 to 1976. Later, he became the director of merchandising and animation at Maurício de Sousa Produções.

Jayme Cortez authored three books: "A Técnica do Desenho," "Mestres da Ilustração," and "Manual Prático do Ilustrador."

== Recognition ==
In November 1986, Jayme Cortez was honored in Lucca, Italy, with the Caran D'Ache Award at the 17th International Festival of Comics and Illustration (Lucca vent'anni), recognizing his 50 years of activity.

From July 17 to 19, 2015, the artist was honored at the 21st Fest Comix (São Paulo) with the exhibition "Grande Mestre dos Quadrinhos: Jayme Cortez," featuring replicas and original works.

In 2023, English publisher Korero Press published two volumes of his horror comic artwork called Terror and Macabras respectively.

== Death ==
Jayme Cortez died just before turning 61 due to a heart attack, after being hospitalized for two days due to abdominal bleeding. He left behind the organized album "Saga do Terror," which compiled several of his comics and was posthumously released by Martins Fontes.

== Jayme Cortez Trophy ==
In the first Angelo Agostini Award in 1984, Cortez received the title of "master" alongside Eugênio Colonnese, Messias de Mello, and Rodolfo Zalla. In the year of his death, in 1987, the award organizers created the Jayme Cortez Trophy, awarded annually to an individual or institution in recognition of their contribution to comics in Brazil.
