= Troféu Angelo Agostini for Master of National Comics =

Comics award winners in Brazil

- Awarded for: artists who have been dedicating themselves to Brazilian comics for at least 25 years
- Sponsored by: AQC-ESP
- Location: São Paulo
- Country: Brazil
- Presented by: Associação dos Quadrinhistas e Caricaturistas do Estado de São Paulo
- First award: 1985
- Website: www.trofeuangeloagostini.com.br

Master of National Comics (Brazilian Portuguese: Mestre do Quadrinho Nacional) is one of the categories of Troféu Angelo Agostini, the most traditional Brazilian award dedicated to comics that has been held since 1985 by Associação dos Quadrinhistas e Caricaturistas do Estado de São Paulo (AQC-ESP).

== History ==
The "Master of National Comics" category has been part of Prêmio Angelo Agostini since its first edition, in 1985. It is aimed to reward artists who have been dedicated to Brazilian comics for at least 25 years. The four honorees of this first edition were chosen by AQC-ESP board. The following year, the winners were elected by open vote for members of AQC-ESP and comics artists associations from other Brazilian states (and, later, for any interested person, whether comics professionals or readers).

The Angelo Agostini's 18th edition, in 2002, exceptionally awarded 13 people as "Master of National Comics" instead of the traditional three names. This would be a tribute to the "majority" of the event (it was "turning 18 years old"). It was the largest number of winners in this category in the same edition.

As of the 2006 edition, the sending of voting ballots, which until then could only be done by mail, also started to occur by e-mail. A new change was made in the 2013 edition: votes were now registered directly on the AQC-ESP's official blog, which resulted in a large increase in the number of votes (14,937 in this edition against a total that hardly exceeded 500 in previous editions).

In 2007, only living artists became eligible for the award (until the previous year, the trophy was awarded posthumously several times). Due to this change, all deceased artists who were part of the list that AQC-ESP published annually of people eligible for the category were automatically defined by the organizing committee as "Masters in memoriam".

Since 2017, the winners of this category became chosen by the organizing committee and no longer by voters. The only exception to this new criterion was in the 2019 edition (when that was chosen by open voting), but in the following edition the definition of the winners in this category was again made by the organizing committee.

Due to the COVID-19 pandemic, the 36th Angelo Agostini Award, which should have taken place in 2020, was held in January 2021. This problem reoccurred in the next edition, focused on the production of 2020 comics, but which had its vote postponed to early 2022. The schedule was regularized in 2022 with the 38th edition of the award being held in the second half of the year.

== Winners and nominees ==
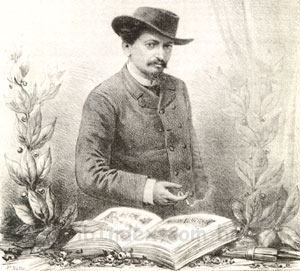
Self-portrait of Angelo Agostini, the artist who names the award and who posthumously received the title of Master of the National Comics in 2004.

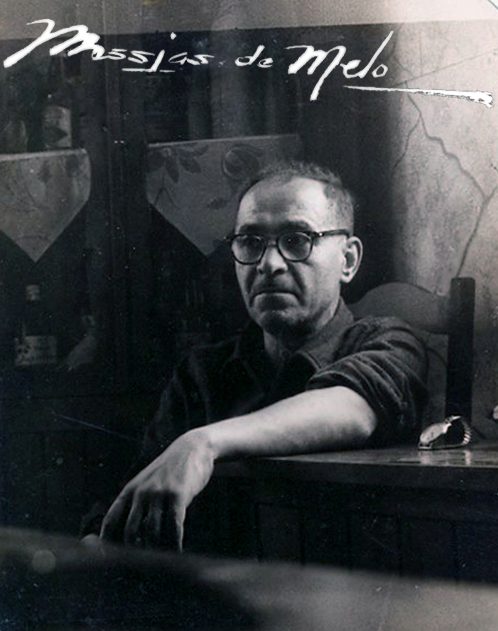
Messias de Mello received the award in 1985.

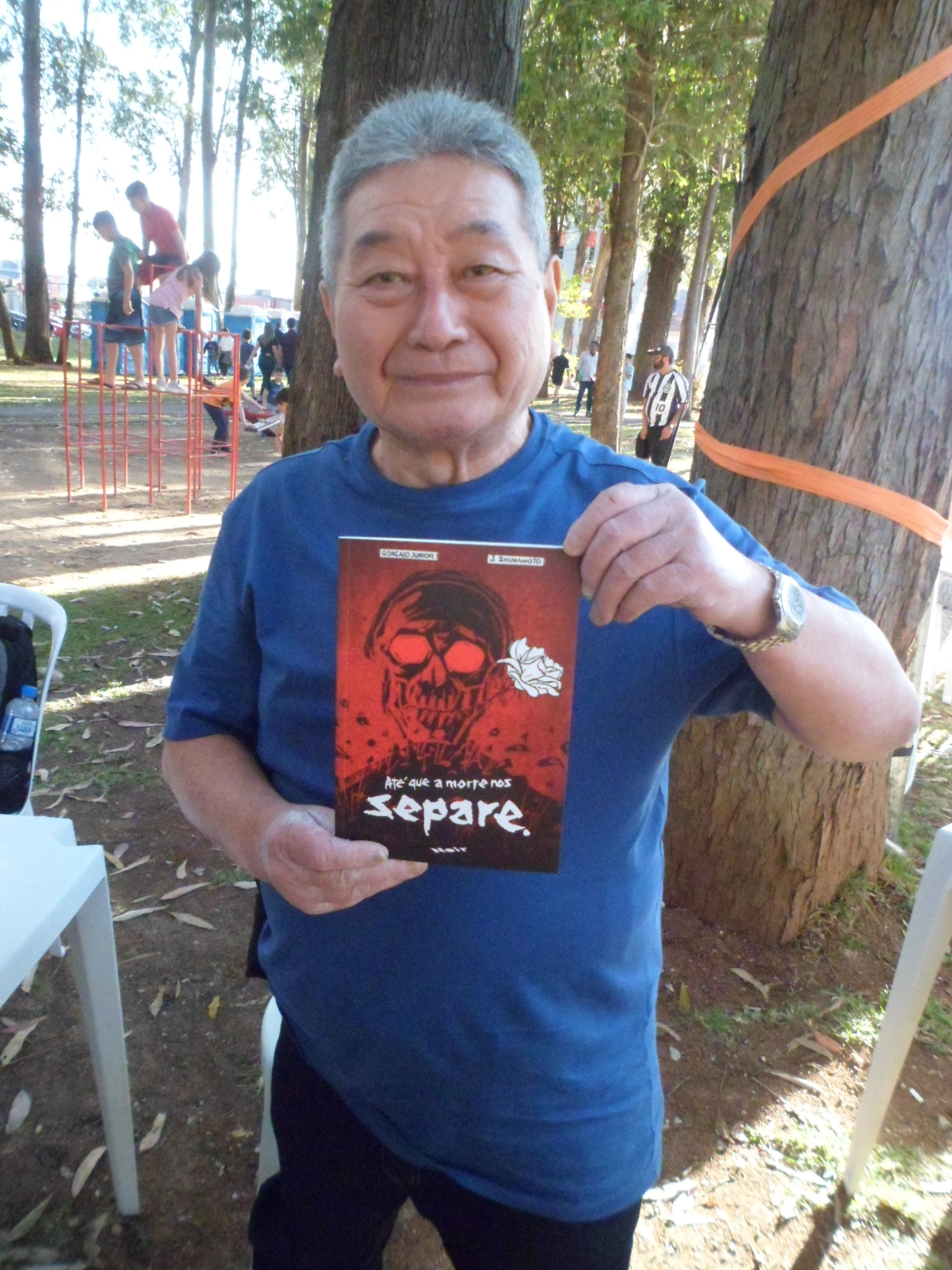
Julio Shimamoto received the award in 1986.

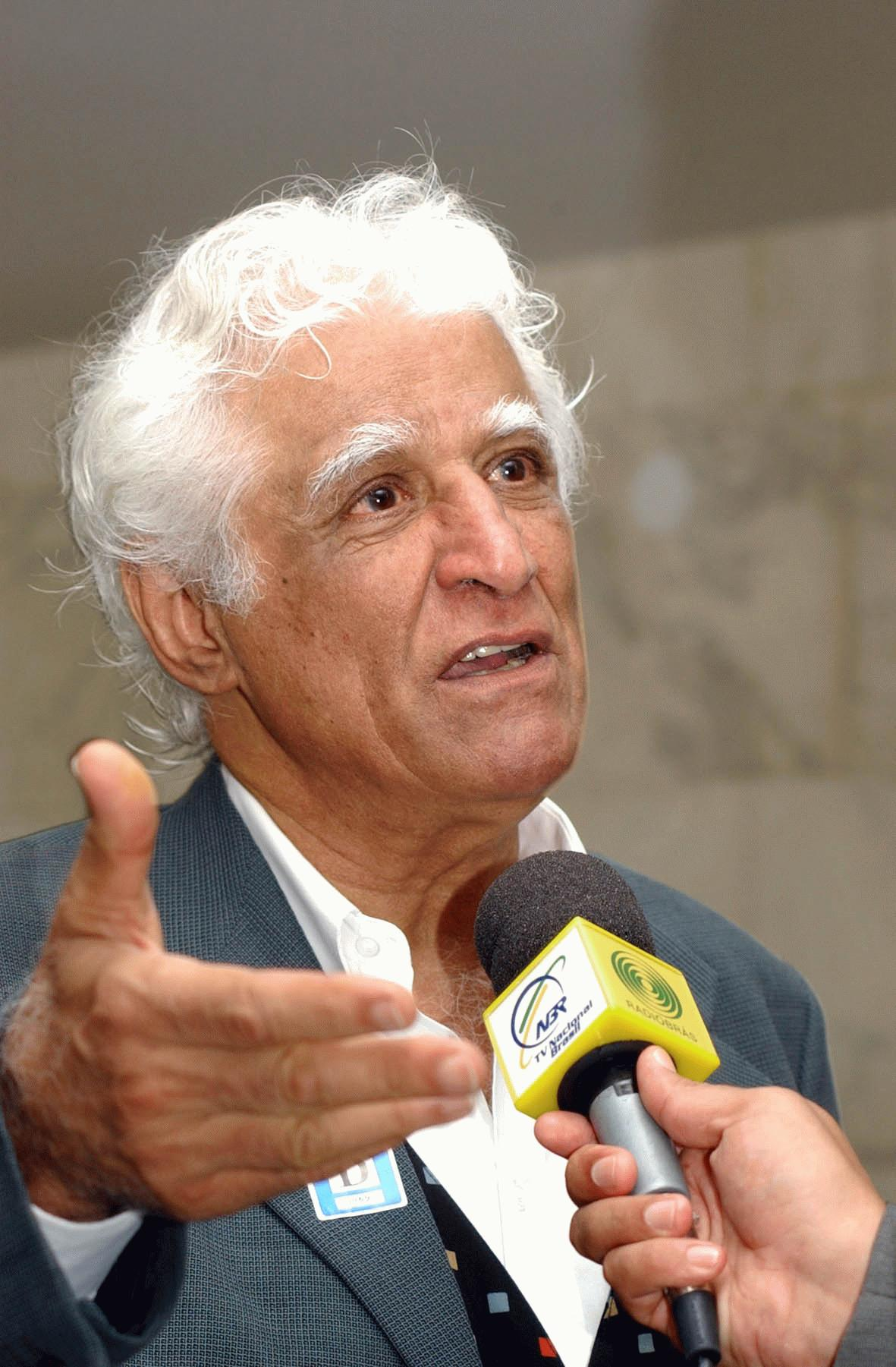
Ziraldo received the award in 1990.

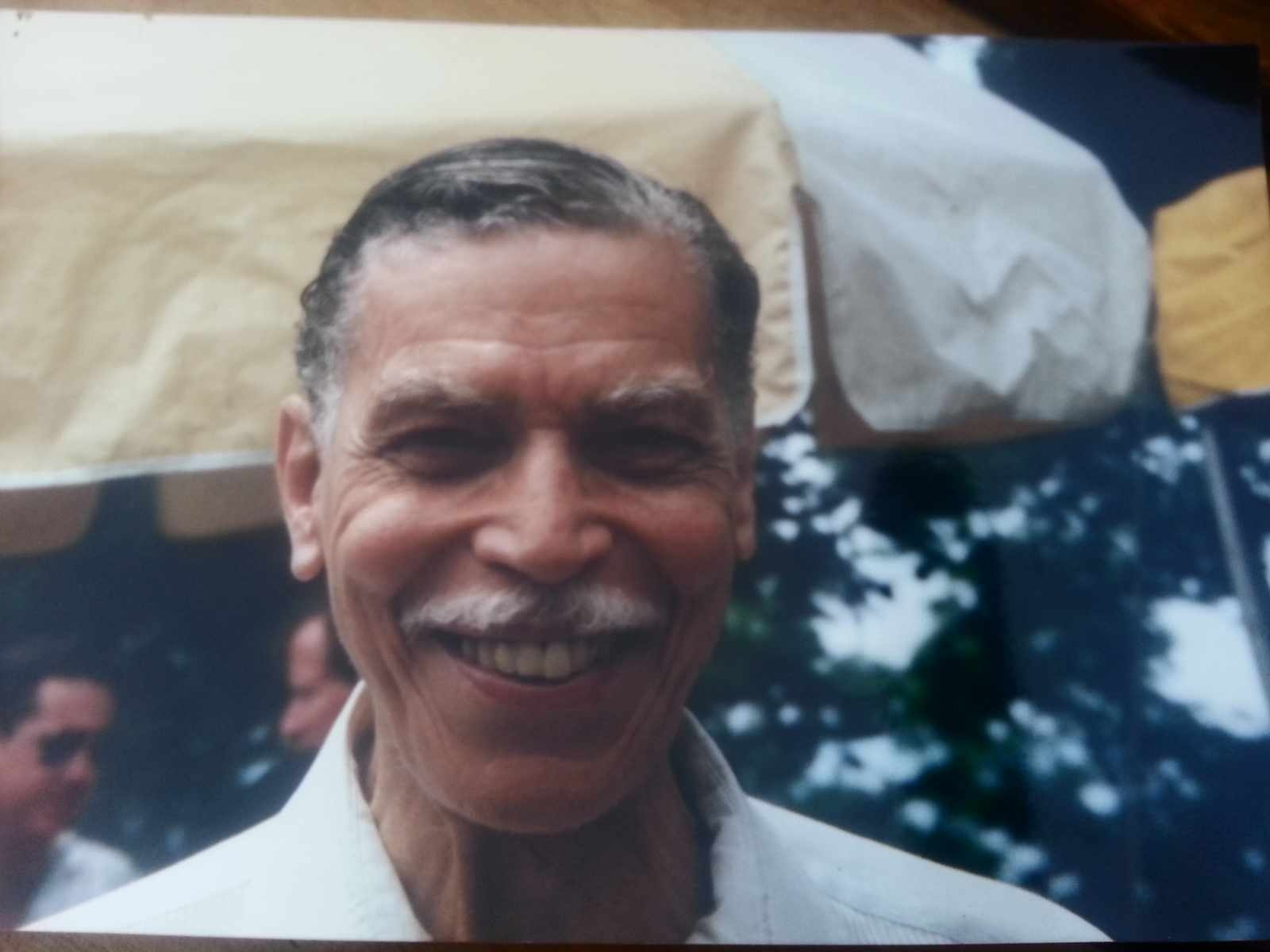
André LeBlanc received the award in 1992.

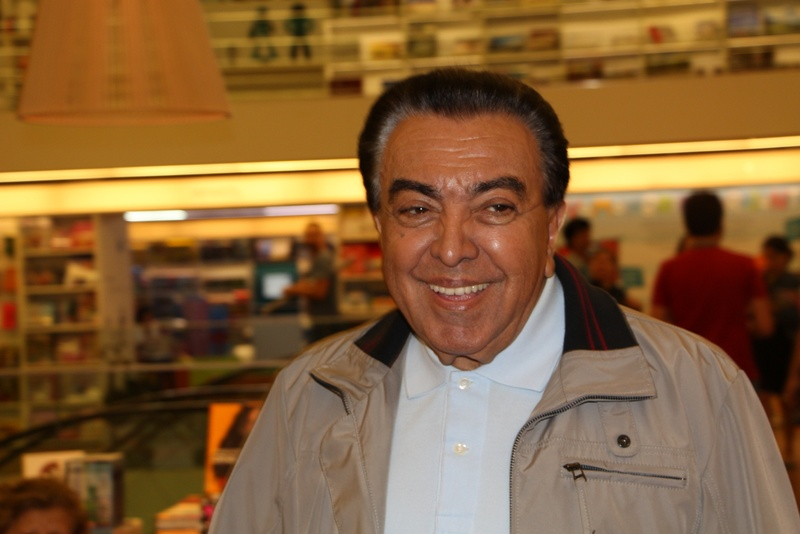
Mauricio de Sousa received the award in 1993.

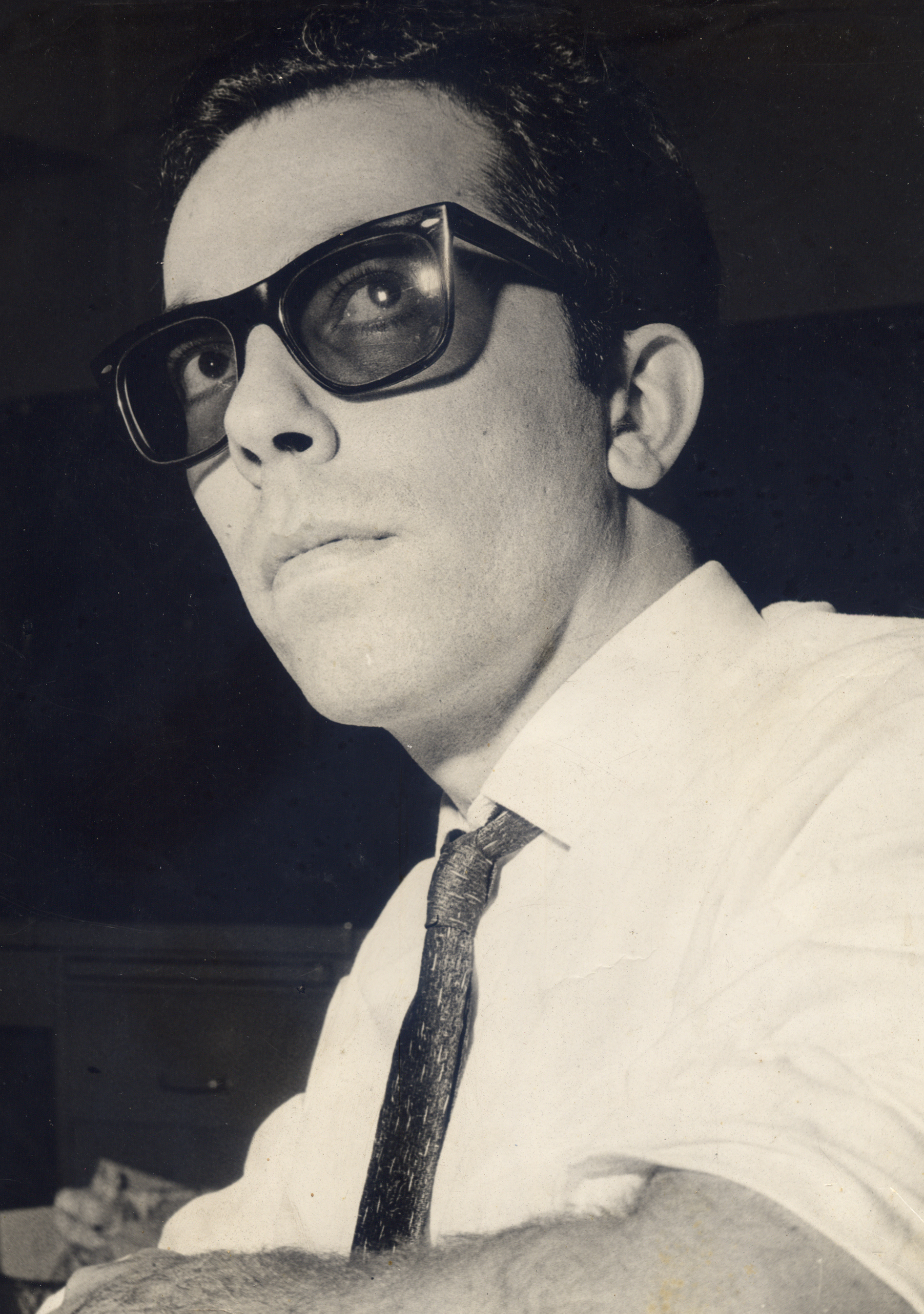
Lyrio Aragão received the award in 1994.

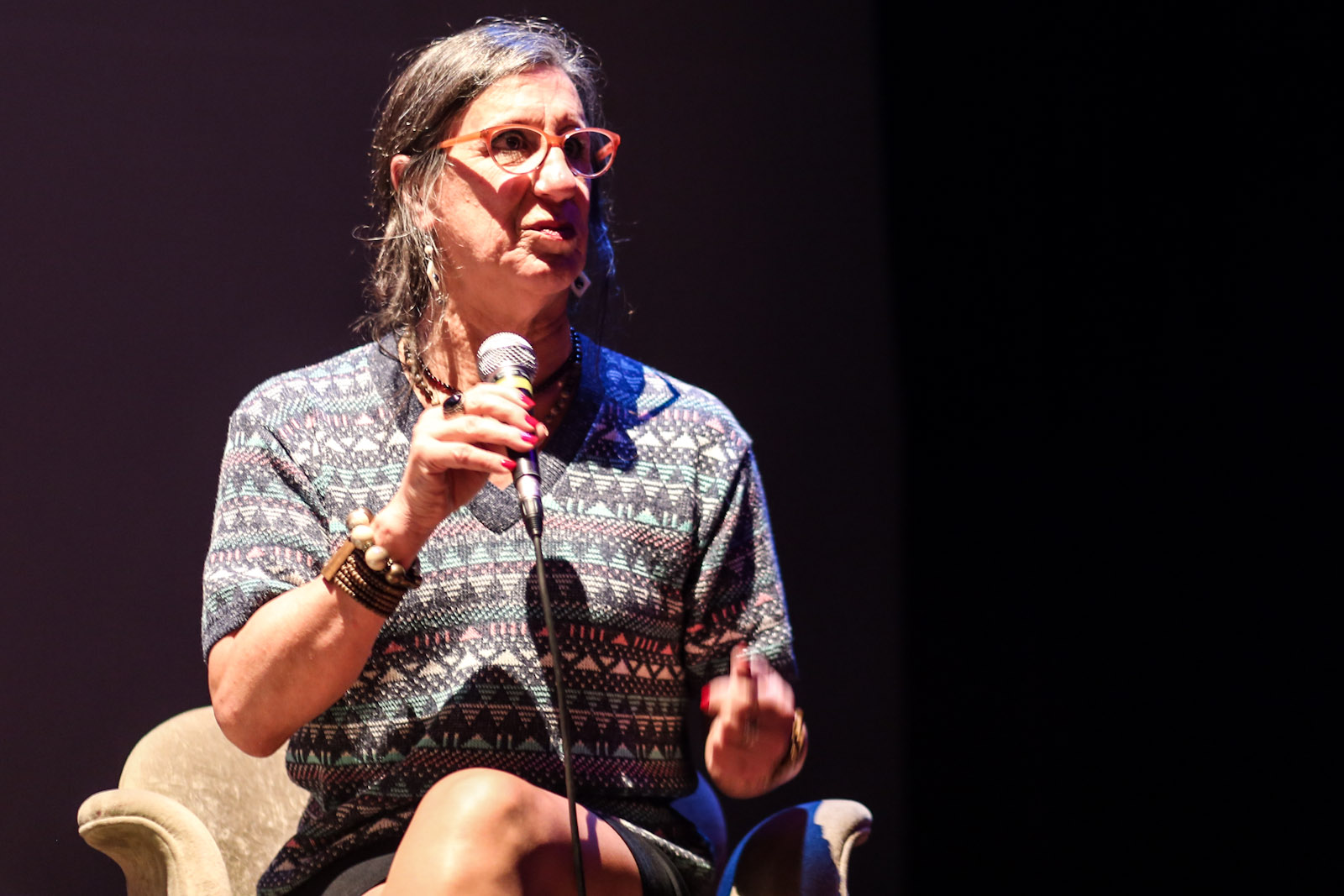
Laerte Coutinho received the award in 2003.

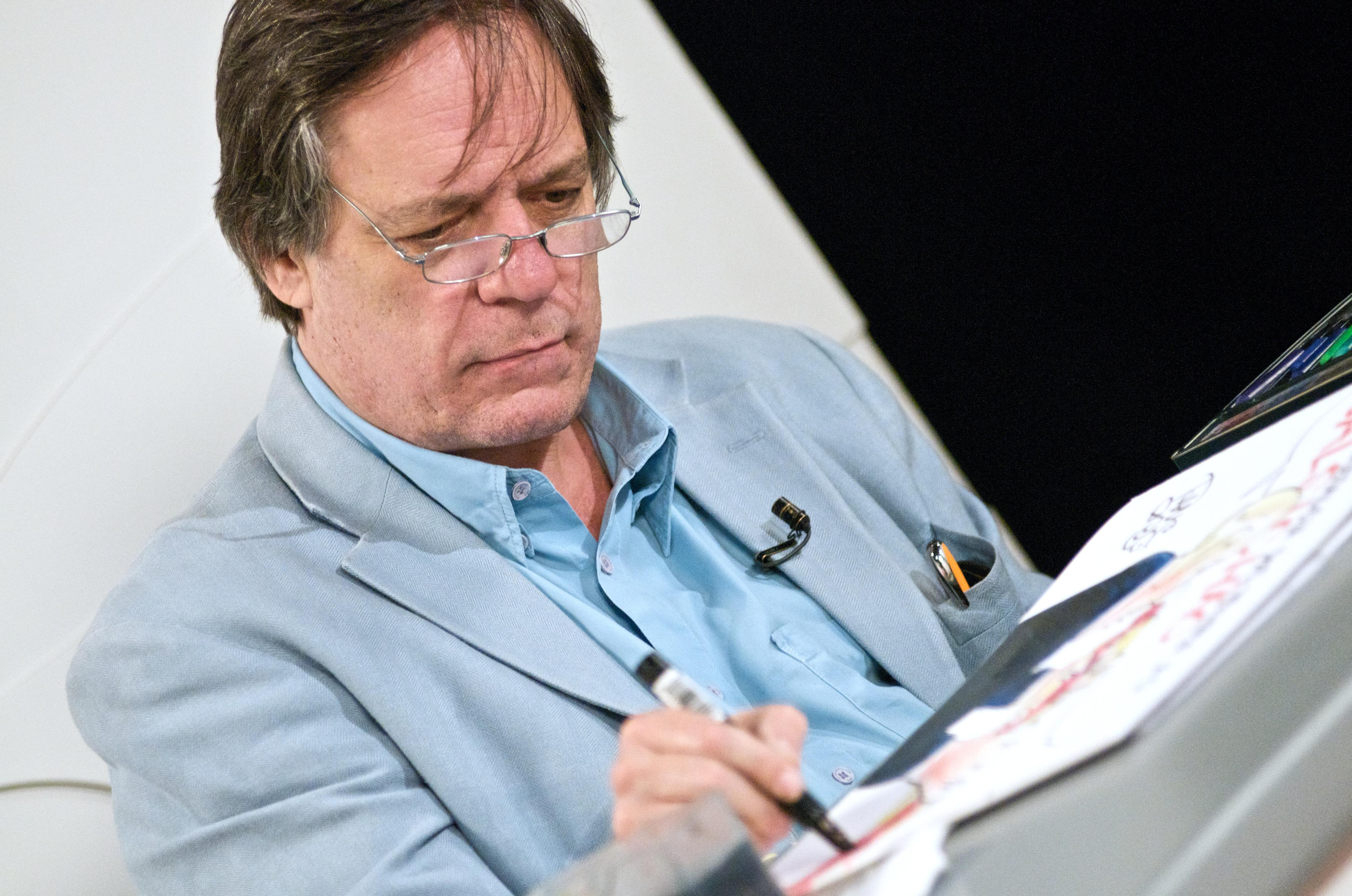
Paulo Caruso received the award in 2005.

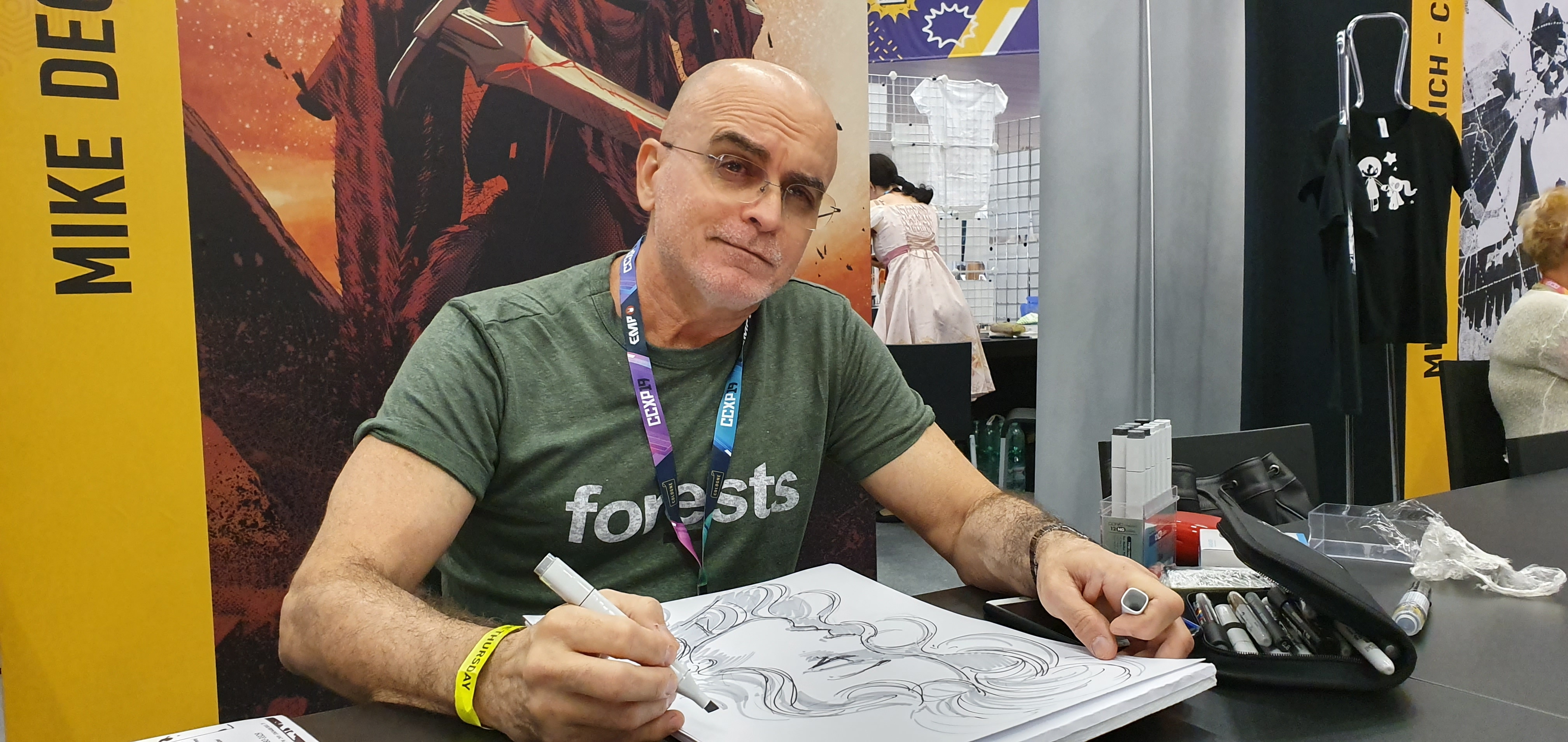
Mike Deodato, also known as Deodato Filho, received the award in 2009.

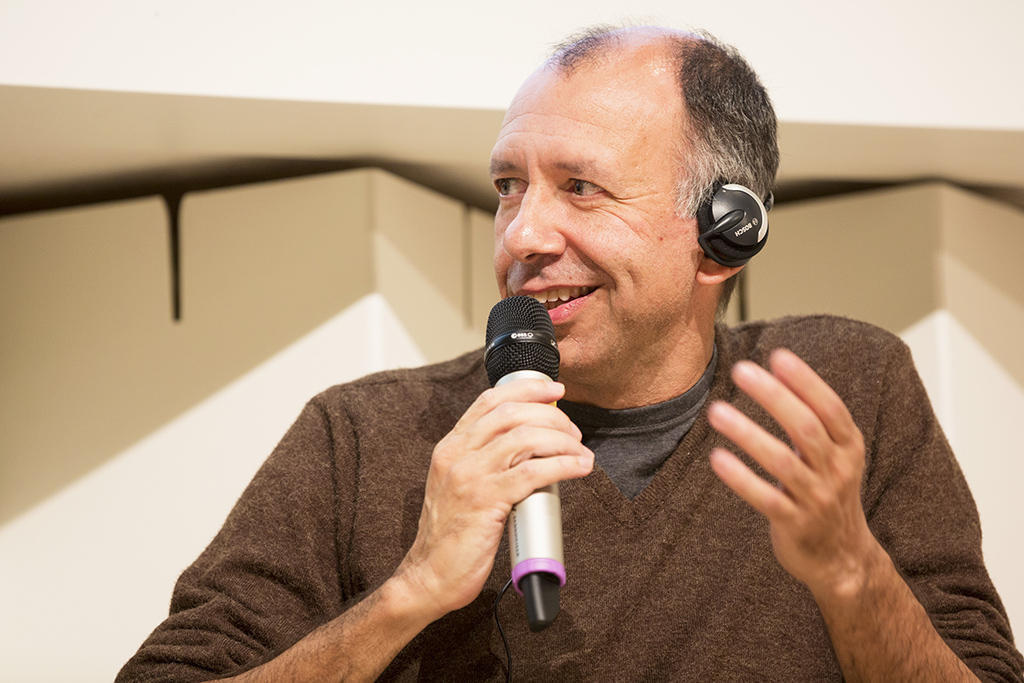
Fernando Gonsales received the award in 2012.

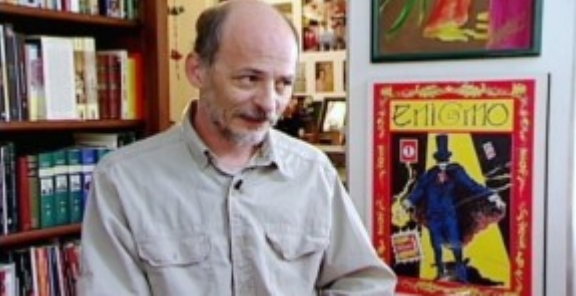
Lourenço Mutarelli received the award in 2012 and 2014.

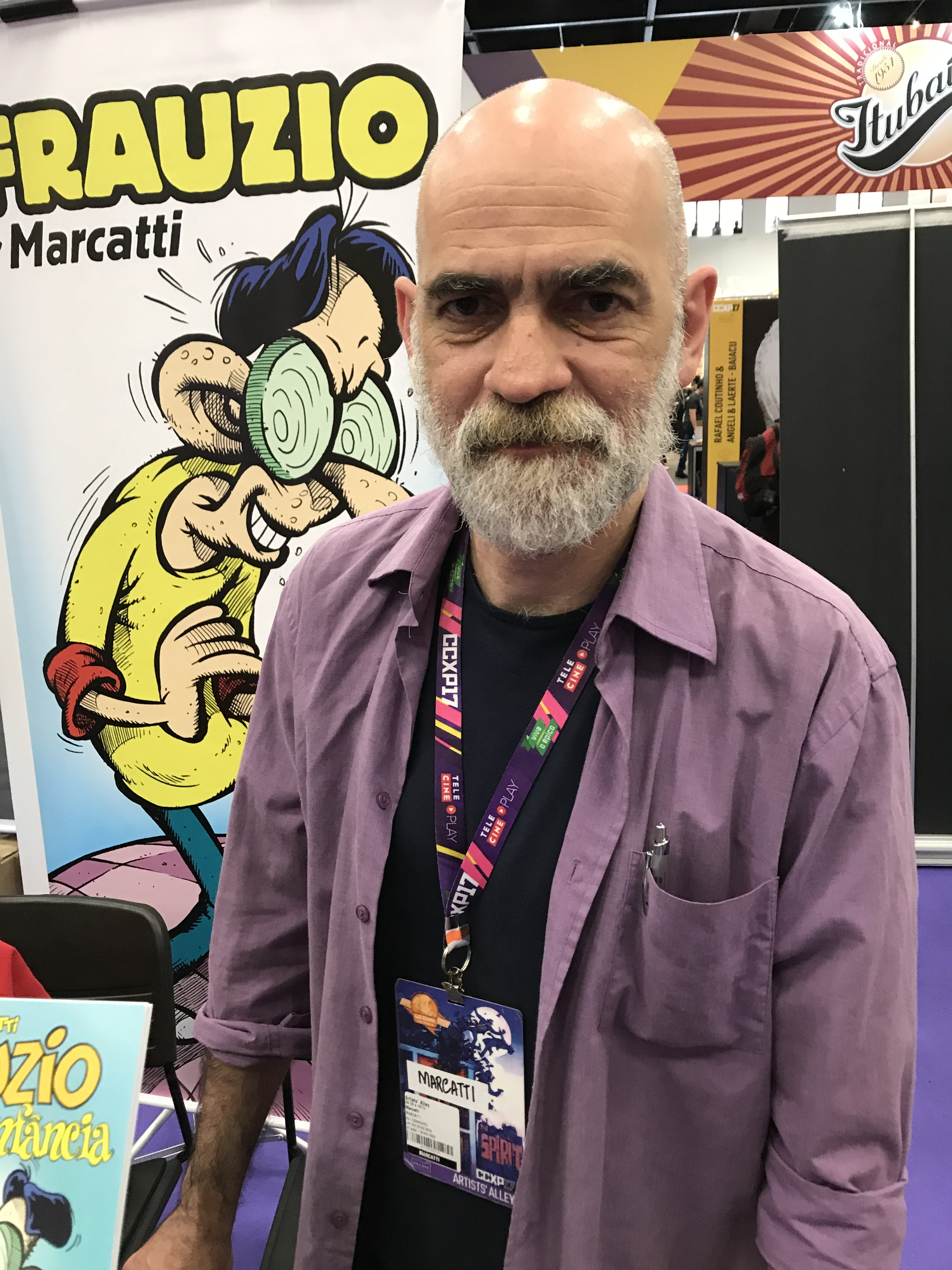
Marcatti received the award in 2016.

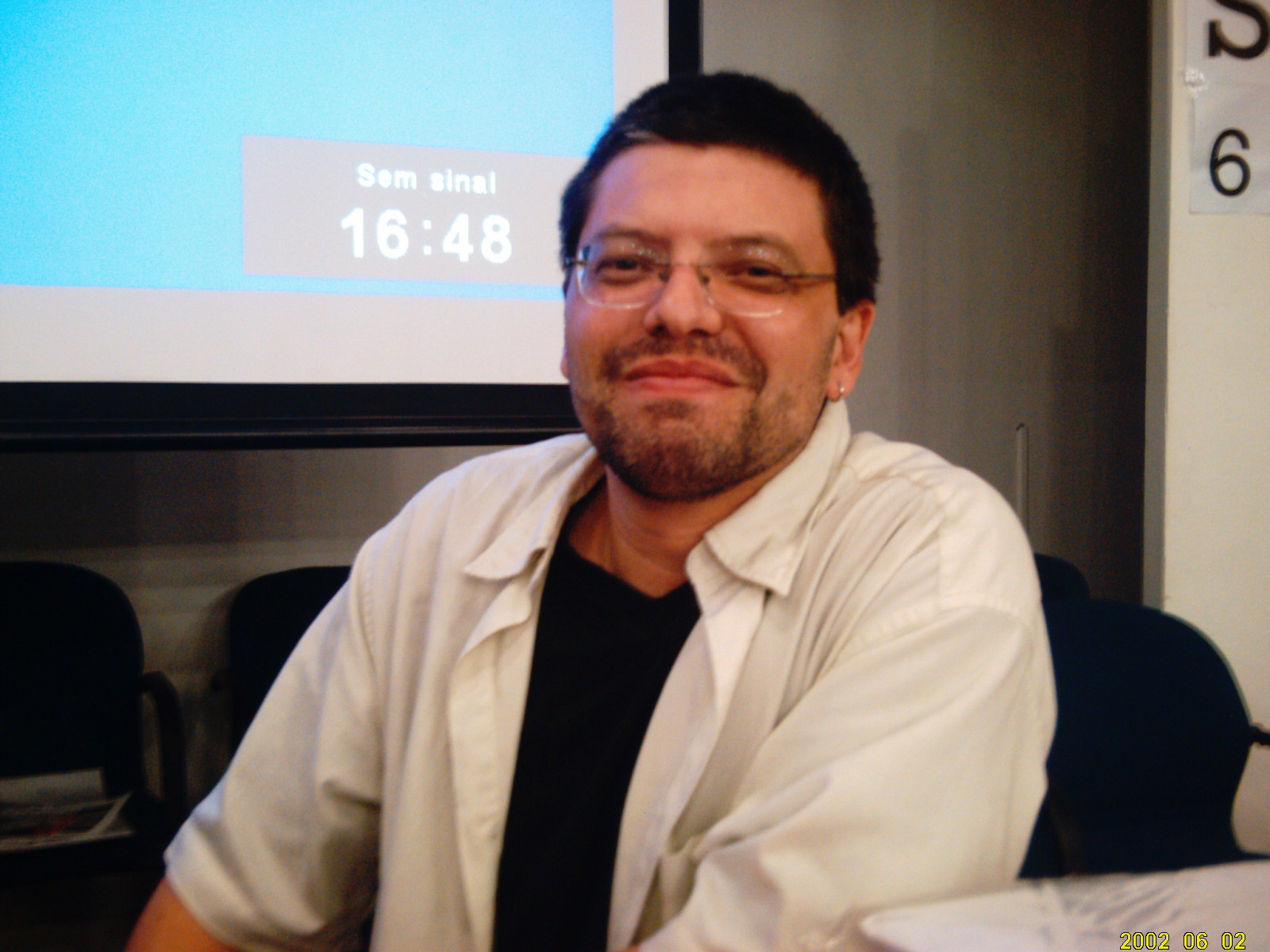
Marcelo Campos received the award in 2019.

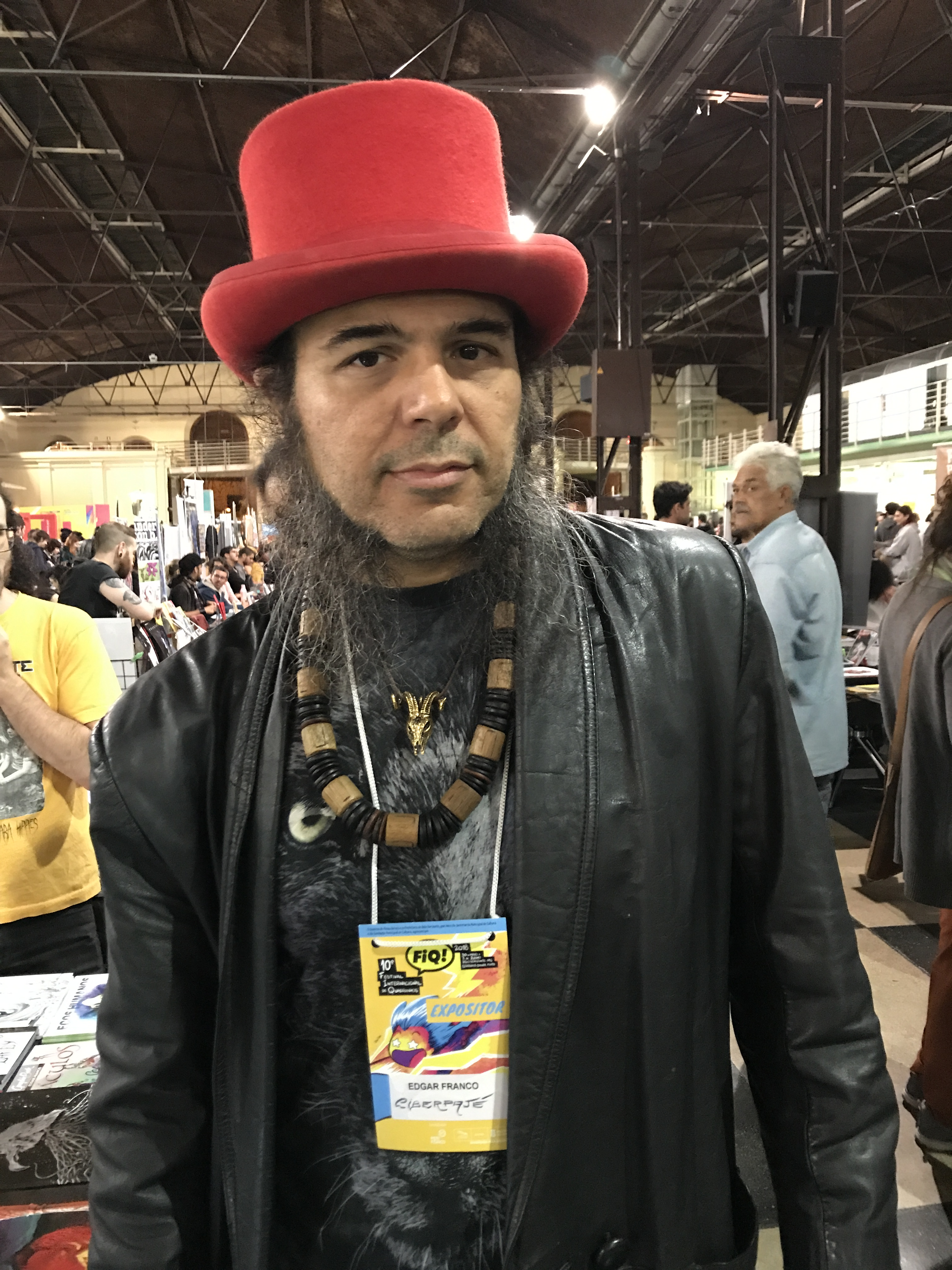
Edgar Franco received the award in 2022.

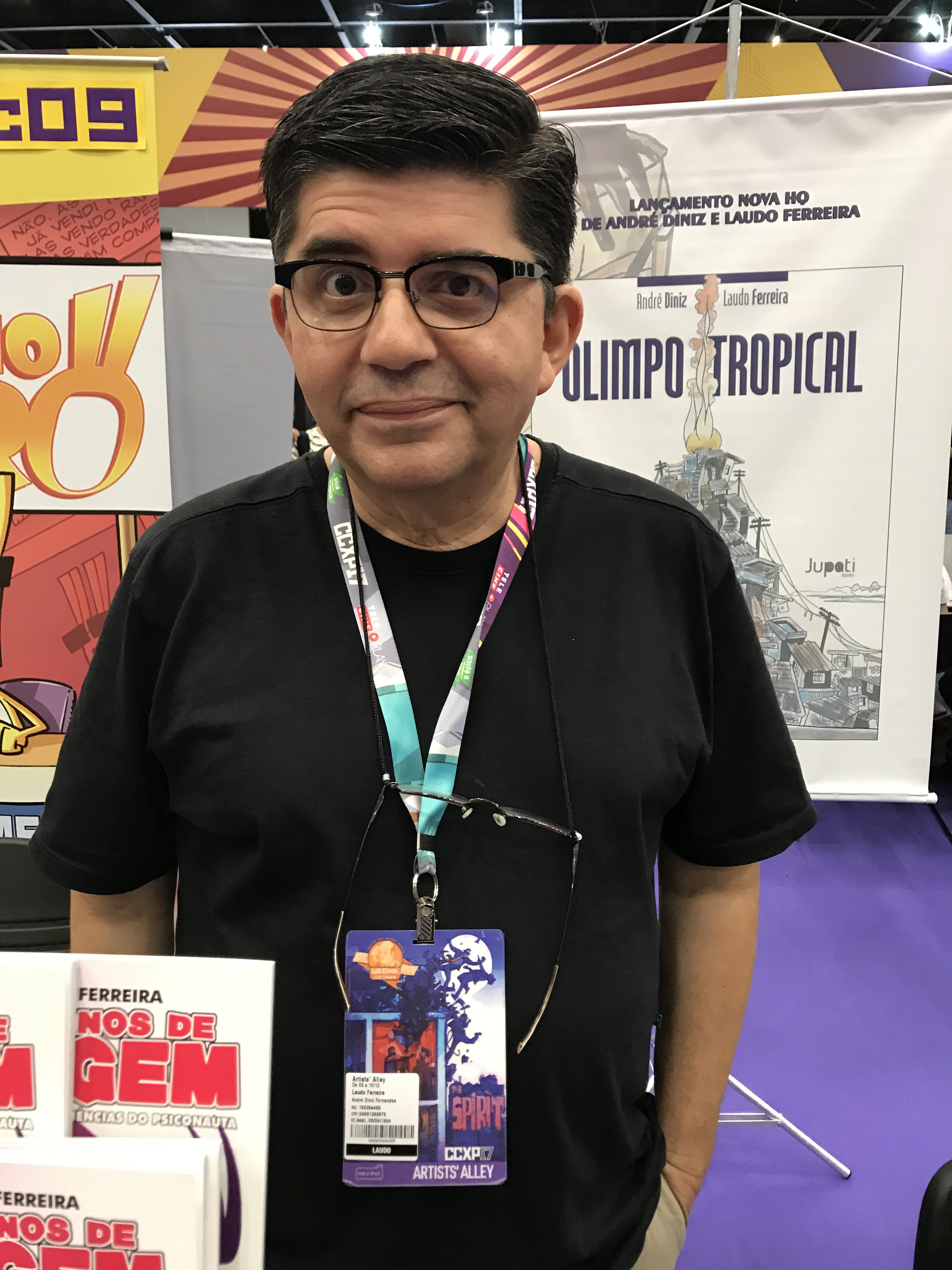
Laudo Ferreira received the award in 2023.

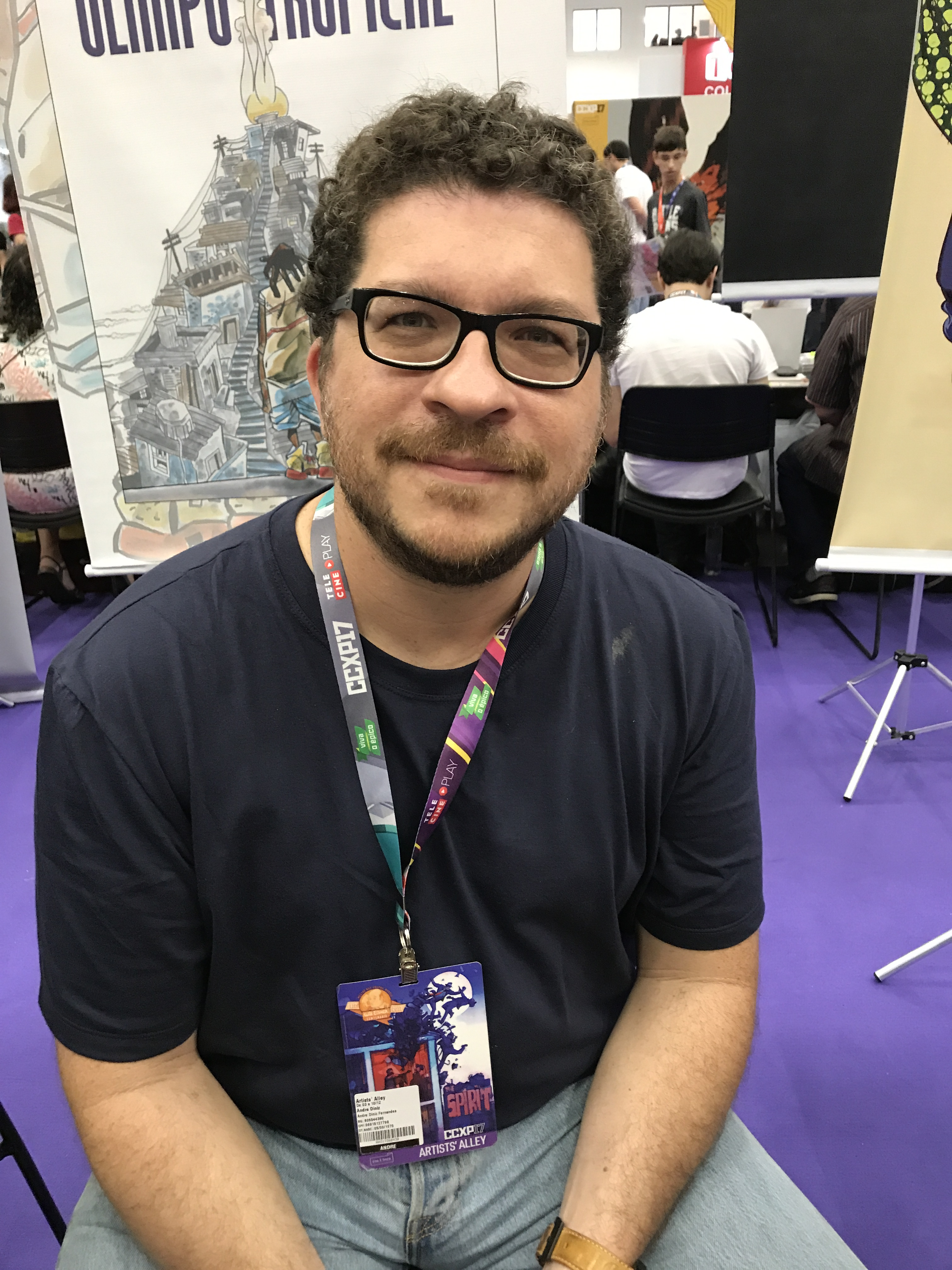
André Diniz received the award in2024.

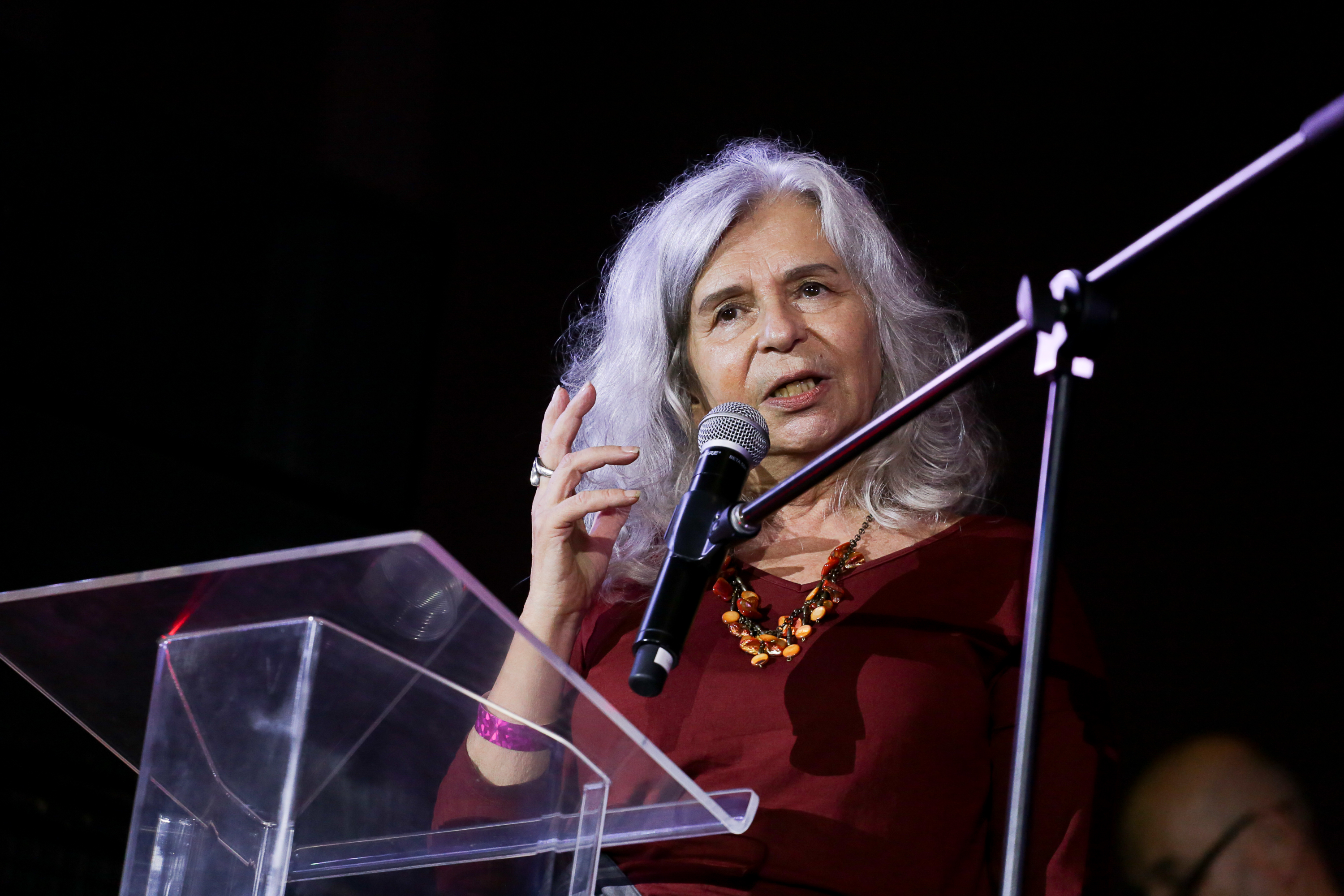
Alice Ruiz received the award in2026.

Year	Winners	Nominees	Ref.
1985	Eugenio Colonnese	Elected by the organizing committee	
1985	Jayme Cortez	Elected by the organizing committee	
1985	Messias de Mello	Elected by the organizing committee	
1985	Rodolfo Zalla	Elected by the organizing committee	
1986	Gedeone Malagola	Open voting, no list of nominees	
1986	Julio Shimamoto	Open voting, no list of nominees	
1986	Nico Rosso	Open voting, no list of nominees	
1987	Flavio Colin	Open voting, no list of nominees	
1987	Henfil	Open voting, no list of nominees	
1987	Sérgio Lima	Open voting, no list of nominees	
1988	Cláudio Seto	Open voting, no list of nominees	
1988	João Batista Queiroz	Open voting, no list of nominees	
1988	Luiz Sá	Open voting, no list of nominees	
1989	Álvaro de Moya	Open voting, no list of nominees	
1989	Jaguar	Open voting, no list of nominees	
1989	Rubens Francisco Lucchetti	Open voting, no list of nominees	
1990	Miguel Penteado	Open voting, no list of nominees	
1990	Walmir Amaral	Open voting, no list of nominees	
1990	Ziraldo	Open voting, no list of nominees	
1991	Aylton Thomaz	Open voting, no list of nominees	
1991	Primaggio Mantovi	Open voting, no list of nominees	
1991	Reinaldo de Oliveira	Open voting, no list of nominees	
1992	André LeBlanc	Open voting, no list of nominees	
1992	Ismael dos Santos	Open voting, no list of nominees	
1992	Izomar Camargo Guilherme	Open voting, no list of nominees	
1993	Carlos Zéfiro	Open voting, no list of nominees	
1993	Mauricio de Sousa	Open voting, no list of nominees	
1993	Waldir Igayara	Open voting, no list of nominees	
1994	Ely Barbosa	Open voting, no list of nominees	
1994	Getulio Delphim	Open voting, no list of nominees	
1994	Lyrio Aragão	Open voting, no list of nominees	
1995	Ivan Saidenberg	Open voting, no list of nominees	
1995	Paulo Fukue	Open voting, no list of nominees	
1995	Roberto Fukue	Open voting, no list of nominees	
1996	Antonio Duarte	Open voting, no list of nominees	
1996	Helena Fonseca	Open voting, no list of nominees	
1996	Paulo Hamasaki	Open voting, no list of nominees	
1997	Fernando Ikoma	Open voting, no list of nominees	
1997	Maria Aparecida Godoy	Open voting, no list of nominees	
1997	Oscar Kern	Open voting, no list of nominees	
1998	Carlos Arthur Thiré	Open voting, no list of nominees	
1998	Manoel Victor Filho	Open voting, no list of nominees	
1998	Zezo	Open voting, no list of nominees	
1999	Deodato Borges	Open voting, no list of nominees	
1999	Luiz Antônio Sampaio	Open voting, no list of nominees	
1999	Péricles	Open voting, no list of nominees	
2000	Adolfo Aizen	Open voting, no list of nominees	
2000	Moacy Cirne	Open voting, no list of nominees	
2000	Renato Silva	Open voting, no list of nominees	
2001	Edson Rontani	Open voting, no list of nominees	
2001	Ivan Wasth Rodrigues	Open voting, no list of nominees	
2001	Renato Canini	Open voting, no list of nominees	
2002	Antônio Cedraz	Open voting, no list of nominees	
2002	Claudio de Sousa	Open voting, no list of nominees	
2002	Edmundo Rodrigues	Open voting, no list of nominees	
2002	Ignácio Justo	Open voting, no list of nominees	
2002	Ionaldo Cavalcanti	Open voting, no list of nominees	
2002	José Delbo	Open voting, no list of nominees	
2002	Luis Sátiro	Open voting, no list of nominees	
2002	Luiz Saidenberg	Open voting, no list of nominees	
2002	Luscar	Open voting, no list of nominees	
2002	Nani	Open voting, no list of nominees	
2002	Osvaldo Talo	Open voting, no list of nominees	
2002	Rubens Cordeiro	Open voting, no list of nominees	
2002	Zaé Júnior	Open voting, no list of nominees	
2003	Antônio Eusébio	Open voting, no list of nominees	
2003	Laerte Coutinho	Open voting, no list of nominees	
2003	Moacir Rodrigues Soares	Open voting, no list of nominees	
2003	Otacilio D'Assunção	Open voting, no list of nominees	
2003	Tony Fernandes	Open voting, no list of nominees	
2004	Angeli	Open voting, no list of nominees	
2004	Angelo Agostini	Open voting, no list of nominees	
2004	Carlos Estêvão	Open voting, no list of nominees	
2004	Chico Caruso	Open voting, no list of nominees	
2004	Rivaldo	Open voting, no list of nominees	
2005	Luiz Gê	Open voting, no list of nominees	
2005	Minami Keizi	Open voting, no list of nominees	
2005	Paulo Caruso	Open voting, no list of nominees	
2006	Jorge Barkinwel	Open voting, no list of nominees	
2006	Lor	Open voting, no list of nominees	
2006	Sônia Luyten	Open voting, no list of nominees	
2007	Gutemberg Monteiro	Open voting, no list of nominees	
2007	Luiz Teixeira da Silva (Tule)	Open voting, no list of nominees	
2007	Xalberto	Open voting, no list of nominees	
2008	Aníbal Barros Cassal	Open voting, no list of nominees	
2008	Antônio Luiz Cagnin	Open voting, no list of nominees	
2008	Diamantino da Silva	Open voting, no list of nominees	
2008	Fernando Dias da Silva	Open voting, no list of nominees	
2008	Ofeliano de Almeida	Open voting, no list of nominees	
2008	Salatiel de Holanda	Open voting, no list of nominees	
2009	Deodato Filho	Open voting, no list of nominees	
2009	Emir Ribeiro	Open voting, no list of nominees	
2009	Mozart Couto	Open voting, no list of nominees	
2009	Sebastião Seabra	Open voting, no list of nominees	
2009	Sergio Morettini	Open voting, no list of nominees	
2009	Watson Portela	Open voting, no list of nominees	
2010	Franco de Rosa	Open voting, no list of nominees	
2010	Henrique Magalhães	Open voting, no list of nominees	
2010	Rodval Mathias	Open voting, no list of nominees	
2011	Dag Lemos	Open voting, no list of nominees	
2011	Eduardo Vetillo	Open voting, no list of nominees	
2011	E.C. Nickel	Open voting, no list of nominees	
2011	Elmano Silva	Open voting, no list of nominees	
2011	Novaes	Open voting, no list of nominees	
2012	Bira Dantas	Open voting, no list of nominees	
2012	Fernando Gonsales	Open voting, no list of nominees	
2012	Lourenço Mutarelli	Open voting, no list of nominees	
2012	Moacir Torres	Open voting, no list of nominees	
2013	Jô Fevereiro	Open voting, no list of nominees	
2013	Júlio Emílio Braz	Open voting, no list of nominees	
2013	Marcos Maldonado	Open voting, no list of nominees	
2014	Byrata	Open voting, no list of nominees	
2014	Lourenço Mutarelli	Open voting, no list of nominees	
2014	Paulo Paiva Lima	Open voting, no list of nominees	
2015	Carlos Edgard Herrero	Open voting, no list of nominees	
2015	Gustavo Machado	Open voting, no list of nominees	
2015	Murilo Marques Moutinho	Open voting, no list of nominees	
2016	Carlos Patati	Open voting, no list of nominees	
2016	Christie Queiroz	Open voting, no list of nominees	
2016	Marcatti	Open voting, no list of nominees	
2017	Arthur Garcia	Elected by the organizing committee	
2017	João Gualberto Costa	Elected by the organizing committee	
2017	Sérgio Graciano	Elected by the organizing committee	
2017	Sidney L. Salustre	Elected by the organizing committee	
2018	Jal	Elected by the organizing committee	
2018	José Menezes	Elected by the organizing committee	
2018	Floreal	Elected by the organizing committee	
2018	Marcelo Cassaro	Elected by the organizing committee	
2019	Ciça Pinto	Aparecido Norberto; Edgar Vasques; José Márcio Nicolosi; José Wilson Magalhães; Luiz Iório; Paulo José; Santiago	
2019	Marcelo Campos	Aparecido Norberto; Edgar Vasques; José Márcio Nicolosi; José Wilson Magalhães; Luiz Iório; Paulo José; Santiago	
2019	Octavio Cariello	Aparecido Norberto; Edgar Vasques; José Márcio Nicolosi; José Wilson Magalhães; Luiz Iório; Paulo José; Santiago	
2020	Aparecido Norberto	Elected by the organizing committee	(Note: Due to the COVID-19 pandemic, the 2020 and 2021 editions had their award ceremonies held online in the respective following years. ("Troféu Angelo Agostini realiza uma nova edição da premiação para homenagear os destaques dos quadrinhos nacionais em 2021" (in Portuguese). O Barquinho Cultural. August 27, 2022.))
2020	Crau da Ilha	Elected by the organizing committee	(Note: Due to the COVID-19 pandemic, the 2020 and 2021 editions had their award ceremonies held online in the respective following years. ("Troféu Angelo Agostini realiza uma nova edição da premiação para homenagear os destaques dos quadrinhos nacionais em 2021" (in Portuguese). O Barquinho Cultural. August 27, 2022.))
2020	Maria da Graça Maldonado	Elected by the organizing committee	(Note: Due to the COVID-19 pandemic, the 2020 and 2021 editions had their award ceremonies held online in the respective following years. ("Troféu Angelo Agostini realiza uma nova edição da premiação para homenagear os destaques dos quadrinhos nacionais em 2021" (in Portuguese). O Barquinho Cultural. August 27, 2022.))
2020	Ykenga	Elected by the organizing committee	(Note: Due to the COVID-19 pandemic, the 2020 and 2021 editions had their award ceremonies held online in the respective following years. ("Troféu Angelo Agostini realiza uma nova edição da premiação para homenagear os destaques dos quadrinhos nacionais em 2021" (in Portuguese). O Barquinho Cultural. August 27, 2022.))
2021	Anita Costa Prado	Elected by the organizing committee	
2021	Edgar Franco	Elected by the organizing committee	
2021	Edgar Vasques	Elected by the organizing committee	
2021	Renato Aroeira	Elected by the organizing committee	
2022	José Márcio Nicolosi	Elected by the organizing committee	
2022	Lilian Mitsunaga	Elected by the organizing committee	
2022	Santiago	Elected by the organizing committee	
2022	Sergio Macedo	Elected by the organizing committee	
2023	Adriana Melo	Elected by the organizing committee	
2023	Érica Awano	Elected by the organizing committee	
2023	Laudo Ferreira	Elected by the organizing committee	
2023	Nilson Azevedo	Elected by the organizing committee	
2024	Ana Luiza Koehler	Elected by the organizing committee	
2024	André Diniz	Elected by the organizing committee	
2024	Lúcia Nóbrega	Elected by the organizing committee	
2024	Rogério de Campos	Elected by the organizing committee	
2025	Adão Iturrusgarai	Elected by the organizing committee	
2025	Gian Danton	Elected by the organizing committee	
2025	Márcia D’Haese	Elected by the organizing committee	
2025	Zélio Alves Pinto	Elected by the organizing committee	
2026	Alice Ruiz	Elected by the organizing committee	
2026	Ataíde Braz	Elected by the organizing committee	
2026	Gilmar	Elected by the organizing committee	
2026	Paula Mastroberti	Elected by the organizing committee	

== See also ==
- List of Prêmio Angelo Agostini winners
