= Waldyr Igayara de Souza =

Brazilian comic book artist and editor

- Born: 12 May 1934; Brazil
- Died: 7 June 2002 (aged 68); Brazil
- Occupation: Comics artist, editor
- Works: Dugan Duck
- Awards: Troféu Angelo Agostini for Master of National Comics (1993)
- Website: waldyrigayara.blogspot.com

Waldyr Igayara de Souza (May 12th, 1934 - June 7th, 2002) was a Brazilian comic book artist and editor. He started his career working for the Outubro and Taika publishing houses, as well as the studio Alcântara Machado Propaganda, along with Lyrio Aragão, Julio Shimamoto and Luiz Saidenberg. In 1961, he started working at editora Abril, being one of the first Brazilian artists to work with Disney comics at the publishing house. He created the character Dugan Duck (Biquinho, in Portuguese), nephew of Fethry Duck. The character was quite successful in Brazil and Italy (where he was called Pennino), being the only duck with a yellow color (which was authorized by Disney, although in Italian stories he has been published with white feathers like the other ducks). Igayara also worked as editorial director of Abril's children's division for 20 years, creating important children's magazines such as Recreio e Alegria. In 1993, he was awarded with the Prêmio Angelo Agostini for Master of National Comics, an award that aims to honor artists who have dedicated themselves to Brazilian comics for at least 25 years.
