= Oscar Kern =

Brazilian comics writer

- Born: Oscar Christiano Kern; 1 September 1935; Taquara
- Died: 12 January 2008 (aged 72); Porto Alegre
- Occupation: Comics writer
- Works: Historieta
- Awards: Troféu Angelo Agostini for Master of National Comics (1997)

Oscar Kern (Taquara, September 1, 1935 – Porto Alegre, January 12, 2008) was a fanzine editor and comics writer. He was a civil servant from the age of 16 until his retirement and wrote comics in parallel with the civil service. In the early 1970s he worked at editora Abril writing Disney comics. In 1972, he launched the first edition of the fanzine Historieta, considered one of the most important in the history of Brazilian comics and whose last edition was published in 2003. In Historieta, Kern published artists such as Mozart Couto, Emir Ribeiro, Mike Deodato and Renato Canini, among others, in addition to writing his own stories, especially the superhero Homem Justo. In 1997, he was awarded with the Prêmio Angelo Agostini for Master of National Comics, an award that aims to honor artists who have dedicated themselves to Brazilian comics for at least 25 years.
