= Cláudio Seto =

Brazilian artist, poet, and photographer

- Born: Chuiji Seto Takeguma; 1944; Guaiçara
- Died: 15 November 2008 (aged 63–64); Curitiba
- Occupation: Polymath, comics artist, illustrator, publisher
- Awards: Troféu Angelo Agostini for Master of National Comics (1988)

Cláudio Seto (1944 – 15 November 2008) was a Brazilian journalist, visual artist, comic artist, poet, photographer, cultural animator and bonsai artist.

== Biography ==
Of Japanese descent, at age nine he went to study at a Zen monastery in Japan, where he took the opportunity to visit Osamu Tezuka's studio on weekends.

When he returned to Brazil in the 1960s, he was hired by Edrel publishing house, where he published stories about samurai and ninja, who were still little known by Brazilians. Seto is considered the forerunner of the use of the manga style in Brazilian comics and his best-known character was O Samurai.

In the 1970s, he moved to Curitiba to work at the Grafipar publishing house, which had hired some of the best Brazilian comic artists of the time (in addition to Seto, other artists who also moved to the city were Flavio Colin, Julio Shimamoto, Mozart Couto, Watson Portela, Rodval Matias and Franco de Rosa).

=== Award ===
In 1988, he was awarded with the Prêmio Angelo Agostini for Master of National Comics, an award that aims to honor artists who have dedicated themselves to Brazilian comics for at least twenty-five years.
