= Walmir Amaral =

Brazilian comic artist (1939–2024)

- Born: Walmir Amaral de Oliveira; 2 December 1939; Rio de Janeiro, Brazil
- Died: 10 January 2024 (aged 84)
- Occupations: Comics artist, editor
- Employer: RGE
- Awards: Prêmio Angelo Agostini for Master of National Comics (1990)

Walmir Amaral de Oliveira (2 December 1939 – 10 January 2024) was a Brazilian comic artist.

Born in Rio de Janeiro, he worked at the Rio Gráfica Editora from 1957 to 1986, where he produced covers and illustrations for several licensed characters including Lee Falk's The Phantom. In the 1960s, Amaral began writing and drawing the comics for O Anjo, a radio character previously drawn by Flavio Colin. Amaral drew some western comics like Straight Arrow and Black Rider.

Amaral was also one of the creators of the project Gibi Semanal, in which he worked as editor and writer. The comic book featured weekly publication of strips such as Beetle Bailey, Peanuts, Frank and Ernest, Tarzan, Rip Kirby, Dick Tracy, and Lucky Luke, as well as characters including Popeye, The Cisco Kid, and The Spirit.

At Editora Abril, he illustrated Zorro stories based on the Disney TV series, The Herculoids from Hanna-Barbera in the comic book Heróis da TV and the series "Alex and Cris" published in Revista Crás!.

In 1990, he was awarded the Prêmio Angelo Agostini for Master of National Comics.

Amaral died on 10 January 2024, at the age of 84.
