= Renato Silva (artist) =

Brazilian illustrator and comic book artist

- Born: Renato de Azevedo Silva; 28 January 1904; Rio de Janeiro
- Died: 6 August 1981 (aged 77); Rio de Janeiro
- Occupation: Art educator, comics artist
- Works: A Garra Cinzenta
- Awards: Troféu Angelo Agostini for Master of National Comics (2000); Prêmio Angelo Agostini for Best Release (Quadrix, 1989)

Renato Silva (Rio de Janeiro, January 28, 1904 - Rio de Janeiro, August 6, 1981) was a Brazilian illustrator and comic book artist.

== Career ==
He studied fine arts in the early 1920s, at the same time he started making humorous drawings for several magazines in Rio de Janeiro, such as Vida Doméstica, Vida Nova and A Maçã. In 1930, Silva left humor drawing and began to do literary illustration, collaborating with O Cruzeiro and O Jornal. He then started working as an illustrator in the communication group A Noite.

In 1937, Silva debuted in the comic strip drawing the pulp character Nick Carter for the comic book Suplemento Juvenil published by Adolfo Aizen. In the same year, he debuted his most successful character, A Garra Cinzenta ("The Gray Claw" in free translation), created in partnership with Francisco Armond. A Garra Cinzenta, a villain without powers but with great knowledge of science, was produced between 1937 and 1939 for the newspaper A Gazeta, totaling 100 pages. The character was also published in Mexico and Belgium, where he received the name "La Griffe Grise", having been published in the weekly Le Moustique from 1944 to 1947.

In 1939, Silva published the book Manual Prático de Desenho ("Practical Drawing Manual" in free translation), the first guide for drawing in Brazil. After that, he started to dedicate himself to art education, developing the how-to draw book series A Arte de Desenhar ("The Art of Drawing" in free translation) with more than one hundred themed editions in the 1940s and 1950s.

== Posthumous award ==
In 2000, he was awarded posthumously with the Prêmio Angelo Agostini for Master of National Comics, an award that aims to honor artists who have dedicated themselves to Brazilian comics for at least 25 years.
