= Thomaz =

Thomaz, a variant of the given name Thomas, may refer to:

== Given name ==
- Thomaz Bellucci (born 1987), Brazilian tennis player
- Thomaz Farkas (1924–2011), Hungarian-born Brazilian photographer and film producer
- Thomaz Henrique (born 1990), Brazilian politician
- Thomaz Koch (born 1945), Brazilian tennis player
- Thomaz Soares da Silva (1921–2002), Brazilian footballer known as Zizinho

== Surname ==
- Alvaro Thomaz (fl. 1500–1521), Portuguese mathematician
- Andrea L. Thomaz, American robotics scientist
- Aylton Thomaz (1934–2009), Brazilian comics artist and painter
- Pablo Thomaz (born 1999), Brazilian footballer
- Raphael David Thomaz (born 1993), Brazilian footballer known as Raphinha
- Wiz Khalifa, American rapper Cameron Jibril Thomaz (born 1987)

== Other ==
- Thomaz (footballer), Brazilian footballer Antonio Thomaz Santos de Barros (born 1986)

== See also ==
- Tomás (disambiguation)
