= Péricles (cartoonist) =

Brazilian cartoonist and caricaturist

- Born: Péricles de Andrade Maranhão; 14 August 1924; Recife
- Died: 31 December 1961 (aged 37); Rio de Janeiro
- Occupation: Cartoonist, comics artist
- Works: O Amigo da Onça
- Awards: Troféu Angelo Agostini for Master of National Comics (1999)

Péricles de Andrade Maranhão (August 14, 1924 - December 31, 1961), who signed only as Péricles, was a Brazilian cartoonist and caricaturist. He moved to Rio de Janeiro around 1942, starting to work in Diários Associados magazines, where he published his first characters. Péricles also illustrated Millôr Fernandes' texts in the Pif-Paf section of O Cruzeiro. His greatest success, however, was the gag cartoon O Amigo da Onça, a character he drew for nearly 20 years, from 1943 until his death. O Amigo da Onça ("The Friend of the Jaguar" in literal translation) is a cynical man whose main objective in life is to harm or tease others. The name came from a joke that has some variations, but usually involves a hunter who tells a friend how he ran away from a jaguar, but his friend doubts him or creates complicated situations, to which the hunter concludes by asking: "Are you my friend or friend of the jaguar?". The expression gained popularity with Péricles' character and is still used in Brazil today as a synonym for untrustworthy people. Péricles committed suicide on New Year's Eve 1961, asphyxiated by cooking gas. He also left a note on his doorstep that said "Don't strike a match". Getúlio Delphim and Zé Geraldo (signing together as "Equipe de O Cruzeiro") did O Amigo da Onça for two years. After them, Carlos Estevão worked on the comic from 1964 until his death in 1972. In 1999, Péricles was awarded posthumously with the Prêmio Angelo Agostini for Master of National Comics, an award that aims to honor artists who have dedicated themselves to Brazilian comics for at least 25 years.
