= Carlos Zéfiro =

Brazilian comics artist (1921–1992)

- Born: Alcides Aguiar Caminha; 26 September 1921; Rio de Janeiro
- Died: 5 July 1992; Rio de Janeiro
- Occupations: Comics artist, civil servant
- Awards: Troféu Angelo Agostini for Master of National Comics (1993)

Carlos Zéfiro is the pseudonym of Alcides Aguiar Caminha (26 September 1921 – 5 July 1992), a Brazilian comic artist who drew pornographic minicomics.

== Biography ==
Alcides Aguiar Caminha was born in São Cristóvão, Rio de Janeiro, Brazil. He was a public employee and lived most time of his life in Anchieta, a neighborhood in the suburbs of Rio de Janeiro. As a secondary job, he drew pornographic comics, signed with the pseudonym Carlos Zéfiro. His small publications became famous and popular in Brazil, circulating in the underground scene during 1950 to 1980.

While popular, Zefiro's pornographic comics sold more than 30,000 numbers at once. His publications were known as "catechisms" and were sold illegally. Getting the "catechisms" was not easy. The newsstand owner (jornaleiro in Portuguese) used to sell it only to known consumers. Places attended only by men, like barbershops, were also points of distribution. It was common for boys to borrow the comics from their friends at school. After being read, the books were generally discarded.

It is estimated that Zéfiro created more than 800 different titles. His production was independent and never linked to publishers, except when it represented an illegal activity. Zéfiro drew at his home in Rio de Janeiro, and close friends printed and distributed the "catechisms" over the country, sometimes going abroad to cities in Uruguay and Argentina. The plots of the stories were always erotic adventures, sometimes incestuous, in different scenarios.

With the exception of a few friends, no one knew the real identity of Zéfiro. He was married to Maria Mont Serrat and had five children. He was a public employee and feared legal action against his pornographic comics, which could result in the loss of his government job. He worked, most of the time, as an expert in fingerprinting identification, at the Department of Immigration in Rio de Janeiro. He also lived for a few years in Brasília during the 1970s.

Caminha feared legal action because of Article 207 of the Federal Law 1711, 1952, which provides punishment to the employee involved in "public incontinence and scandalous". For the society of the time, Zéfiro's pornographic magazines were pure scandal.

Emílio Garrastazu Médici was the president of Brazil in 1970. That year, on June 10, a military search to find who was responsible for the "catechisms" resulted in the arrest of Hélio Brandão, found with more than 50,000 magazines in Rio de Janeiro. Brandão was the main illegal editor of Zéfiro and had been in jail for three days. After that, he broke his partnership with Caminha, who was not arrested because nobody could prove he was, in fact, Zéfiro.

Interest in Zéfiro's work declined in the 1970s, when magazines with photos of explicit sex were sold freely on Brazilian newsstands.

=== Catechisms ===
The origin of the term "catechism" is controversial. In the 1970s, it was said that the author was a former seminarian. This version was powered by the anonymity of Zéfiro, which allowed different interpretations. For some, the term would have occurred spontaneously. Just as the religious books used in catechesis, the pornographic drawings of Zéfiro also helped thousands of young boys to discover sexuality. For others, the name had to do with the habit of newsstand owner to hide the magazines in other publications, sometimes religious. Another version says that the term may be the adaptation to Portuguese of the Tijuana Bibles, erotic comics sold illegally in the United States between 1930 and 1950, another version affirms that its inspiration were Romance comics of the publisher Mexican-Brazilian Editormex and photo comics pornography from Sweden.

=== Real identity ===
Just a few months before Caminha's death, on July 5, in Rio de Janeiro, Zéfiro's identity was revealed. As he feared legal action against his work, his real name, Alcides Caminha, never came up until November 1991, when a report about Zéfiro was published in the Brazilian version of Playboy magazine. The report was signed by Brazilian journalist Juca Kfouri, who was the managing editor of the magazine in Brazil.

=== Songwriting ===
Caminha was also a writer of samba lyrics, and had as a music partner the Brazilian samba singer Nelson Cavaquinho. They met in Tiradentes Square, in downtown Rio de Janeiro, a place where sambistas used to get together. Caminha and Cavaquinho were partners in the composition of at least two songs: Notícia and A Flor e o Espinho.

A Flor e o Espinho represents a controversial matter. The sambista Guilherme de Brito, who also wrote the lyric for the music, said in an interview to Brazilian newspaper Folha de S.Paulo that Caminha had only paid Cavaquinho to sign the composition. De Brito told the same version of the story to Flávio Moreira da Costa, author of a book about Cavaquinho. A Flor e o Espinho was recorded several times, one of them by the famous Brazilian singer and actress Elizeth Cardoso, in 1965. The official record of the Brazilian Union of Composers shows the name of Caminha among the authors of the lyric.

=== Tributes ===
After the death of Caminha, Zéfiro's work began to be prized as nostalgia, and original editions of his books fetch high prices at auctions. Caminha was honored at events like the first Biennial International Comics Festival, in Rio de Janeiro in 1992. He received the award Troféu HQ Mix, for the importance of his work.

In 1996, Zéfiro's work also illustrated the cover of the CD Barulhinho Bom, by the Brazilian MPB singer Marisa Monte. In August 1999, in Anchieta, a neighborhood where Caminha lived, a cultural center named Carlos Zéfiro was opened, with a show of Marisa Monte with Velha Guarda da Portela, a traditional Brazilian samba group. The cultural center had many other shows and workshops, but was closed in 2008.

In 2007, Brazilian journalists Lucas Frasão and Marcio Orsolini began to investigate Caminha's life. After a year, they finished the first version of Zéfiro's biography, which is still being written. Zéfiro was the theme of another three books, published before his death: O Quadrinho Erótico de Carlos Zéfiro, by journalist and cartoonist Otacílio D'Assunção (first editor of the Brazilian version of Mad magazine), A Arte Sacana de Carlos Zéfiro and Os Alunos Sacanas de Carlos Zéfiro, by Joaquim Marinho.
