= Maria Aparecida Godoy =

Brazilian comic artist

- Born: Guaratinguetá
- Occupation: Writer, comics writer
- Awards: Troféu Angelo Agostini for Master of National Comics (1997)

Maria Aparecida Godoy (born 1945, Guaratinguetá), also known as Cida Godoy, is a Brazilian comic artist and one of the pioneers in the horror and suspense genre in Brazil.

== Career ==
She started by writing horror stories based on Brazilian folklore, which she sent to several publishers in the hope that one would be interested. One of his texts, "A Vingança da Escrava" ("The Revenge of the Slave Woman"), was read in 1968 by the then art director of Taika publishing house, Rodolfo Zalla, who invited Godoy to turn it into a comic book script and publish in the comic book Estórias Negras, published by GEP. From there, she started writing more and more horror comics, one of her highlights being the Dracula stories in Taika. Her last works in comics were published in 1993 in the horror comic book Calafrio.

== Awards ==
In 1997, she was awarded with the Prêmio Angelo Agostini for Master of National Comics, an award that aims to honor artists who have dedicated themselves to Brazilian comics for at least 25 years.
