= Izomar Camargo Guilherme =

Brazilian comic artist (born 1938)

- Born: December 1 1938 Botucatu, Brazil
- Area: Cartoonist
- Notable works: Geloso, o gelinho
- Awards: Prêmio Angelo Agostini for Master of National Comics

Izomar Camargo Guilherme (born December 1, 1938, in Botucatu) was a Brazilian comic artist. He started his career in the 1950s at La Selva publishing house. Among other children's characters, he created Zing Zong Crunch, the goblins Dingo and Dungo, the crazy duck Reco and the little native Bugrinho. Izomar also worked at Editora Abril with Disney comics in the 1960s (especially Zé Carioca), in addition to being art director and responsible for the publisher's comic book covers in the 1970s and 1980s. In 1992, he was awarded with the Prêmio Angelo Agostini for Master of National Comics, an award that aims to honor artists who have dedicated themselves to Brazilian comics for at least 25 years.
