= Edson Rontani =

Brazilian illustrator and fanzine editor

- Born: 23 March 1933; Piracicaba
- Died: 24 February 1997 (aged 63); Piracicaba
- Alma mater: Methodist University of Piracicaba
- Occupation: Journalist, lawyer, comics artist, cartoonist, radio personality, fanzine editor
- Works: Ficção
- Awards: Troféu Angelo Agostini for Master of National Comics (2001)
- Website: edsonrontani.blogspot.com

Edson Rontani (Piracicaba, March 23, 1933 – Piracicaba, February 24, 1997) was a Brazilian illustrator and fanzine editor, known for having created the first Brazilian fanzine about comics.

== Career ==
Graduated in Law from Methodist University of Piracicaba, he never worked as a lawyer, preferring to be an artist. In the 1940s, he created the mascot of the XV de Novembro football team, from Piracicaba, which the team still wears today. Rontani worked as an illustrator in several newspapers and magazines in Piracicaba. In the 1950s, he opened a drawing studio called Orbis to do illustration and calligraphy services.

== Fanzines ==
In October 1965, Rontani started to publish the fanzine Ficção, which is considered the first Brazilian fanzine about comics and one of the first fanzines in Brazil. At the time, he had a collection of around 70,000 comics from different countries and wanted to communicate with other people who shared his interest. Initially, Ficção, which was done using ink mimeograph, was called "boletim" ("bulletin" in Portuguese), but it was called a fanzine when a club of French collectors wrote to Rontani using this term, which he did not know at the time. Ficção had 12 issues of irregular periodicity (the last issue was released in 1970), but it attracted a large number of readers, including comic book collectors and fans, who received the fanzine free of charge by mail. After this, Rontani also published the fanzines Universo H.Q. (in 1970s) and Rontani Fanzine (in 1982).

== Posthumous award ==
In 2001, he was awarded posthumously with the Prêmio Angelo Agostini for Master of National Comics, an award that aims to honor artists who have dedicated themselves to Brazilian comics for at least 25 years.
