= Daniel Messias =

Brazilian animator

- Born: 1938 (age 87–88)
- Website: danmess.com.br

Daniel Messias (São Paulo, December 13, 1938) is a Brazilian animator. He is the son of comic book artist Messias de Mello and the nephew of poet and journalist Judas Isgorogota.

== Career ==
Daniel Messias began working in animation in the early 1970s, having founded his own studio in 1975.

== Cameos ==
Among other projects, he was responsible for Brazilian Television segments for the animation channel Cartoon Network such as a series of short films about the Discovery of Brazil called "Terra á vista" featuring characters from Cow and Chicken, Dexter's Laboratory, The Powerpuff Girls, I Am Weasel, Johnny Bravo, Ed, Edd n Eddy, Codename: Kids Next Door, Courage the Cowardly Dog, The Grim Adventures of Billy & Mandy, Whatever Happened to... Robot Jones?, Foster's Home for Imaginary Friends, Hi Hi Puffy AmiYumi, The Life and Times of Juniper Lee, Camp Lazlo and My Gym Partner's a Monkey. as well as local episodes editions of Space Ghost: Coast to Coast and various commercials. These projects often utilized Warner Bros. characters (including those from Hanna-Barbera (The Flintstones, The Jetsons, Top Cat, Wally Gator, Snagglepuss, Augie Doggie and Doggie Daddy, Scooby-Doo, Where Are You!, Atom Ant, Magilla Gorilla, Lippy the Lion and Hardy Har Har, Pixie and Dixie and Mr. Jinks, Huckleberry Hound, Quick Draw McGraw, Snooper and Blabber.), MGM Cartoons (The Pink Panther Show, Tom and Jerry and Dumb-Hounded.), Cartoon Network, and the comic book publisher DC Comics, all of which belong to the same conglomerate). Daniel also directed animated short films, most notably Natal da Turma da Mônica (1976), Dinda's (1993), and Los 3 Amigos (2009). With the latter, he won the 22nd HQ Mix Trophy in the "Best Adaptation to Another Medium" category.
