= Miguel Penteado =

Brazilian publisher, printer and comic artist

- Areas: Cartoonist, Publisher
- Awards: Prêmio Angelo Agostini for Master of National Comics

Miguel Penteado was a Brazilian publisher, printer and comic artist. He started his career working at La Selva publishing house in the 1950s, illustrating horror comic book covers. In 1959, he founded, together with Jayme Cortez, the publishing house Continental (later renamed Outubro) with the objective of publishing only Brazilian comics. It was in this publishing house that Mauricio de Sousa debuted in comic books with Bidu. After leaving Outubro due to disagreements with Cortez and other partners, Penteado founded the publishing house GEP (Gráfica e Editora Penteado), which, among other publications, was responsible for part of the material from Marvel Comics in Brazil from 1969, publishing for the first time in the country characters like the Silver Surfer, the X-Men and Captain Marvel. He gave up working as a publisher in 1972, after having several of his magazines censored by the then Brazilian military dictatorship, retiring in 1980. In 1990, he was awarded with the Prêmio Angelo Agostini for Master of National Comics, an award that aims to honor artists who have dedicated themselves to Brazilian comics for at least 25 years.
