= Ivan Saidenberg =

Brazilian comic artist

- Born: November 12, 1940 Piracicaba, Brazil
- Died: September 30, 2009 (aged 68) Santos, Brazil
- Areas: Writer, Artist
- Notable works: The Red Bat
- Awards: Prêmio Angelo Agostini for Master of National Comics

Ivan Saidenberg (November 12, 1940 – September 30, 2009) was a Brazilian comics artist, writer and cartoonist.

== Career ==
Saidenberg began his career in 1960 at the Outubro publishing house, where he worked until 1963 creating horror comics. Later he also worked at Taika and Royal publishing houses with comics and westerns, war and espionage.

In 1971, he started working at editora Abril with Disney comics, being one of the most prolific Brazilian authors of Disney stories. In 1973 he created the character The Red Bat (Portuguese: Morcego Vermelho), Fethry Duck's superhero alter ego. The character was quite successful in Brazil, but had few stories published abroad (mostly in Italy, where he was named Paper Bat, and in Portugal).

In 1975, he created The Green Bat (Portuguese: Morcego Verde) with Renato Canini (also a superhero version of José Carioca), as well as the vast majority of secondary characters in the comic book Zé Carioca, which was published in Brazil from 1961 to 2018. He stayed at Abril until 1984, moving to Israel until 1988, when he returned to work at Abril until 1993.

== Awards ==
In 1995, Saidenberg was awarded with the Prêmio Angelo Agostini for Master of National Comics, an award that aims to honor artists who have dedicated themselves to Brazilian comics for at least 25 years.
