= Fernando Ikoma =

Brazilian painter, writer and comic artist

- Born: 22 January 1945; Martinópolis
- Occupations: Painter, comics artist
- Awards: Troféu Angelo Agostini for Master of National Comics (1997)
- Website: blogdoikoma.blogspot.com

Fernando Ikoma (Martinópolis, January 22, 1945) is a Brazilian painter and comic book artist of Japanese descent. He moved to Curitiba at the age of 14, where he started working as an apprentice shop window designer. At 19, Ikoma started to work with comics in search of a better financial situation. He worked as a comic artist at EDREL, EBAL and Abril publishing houses. His main creation in the comics was the character Fikom, published by EDREL in the 1970s and whose adventures took place in the world of dreams, a place where his alter ego, the ugly Mukifa, could play the role of a beautiful hero. He also wrote the book A Técnica Universal das Histórias em Quadrinhos ("The Universal Technique of Comics", in free translation). Ikoma, however, left comics after some years (and many pages created) to work as a painter.

Self-taught in the plastic arts, his works are made with oil painting or acrylic painting and usually feature minimalist characters in wheat landscapes. Ikoma's works can be found in the Vatican, the Royal House of Sweden and in private collections in various regions of America, in addition to having received exhibitions in Brazil and abroad, such as in the United States and Switzerland. In 1997, he was awarded with the Prêmio Angelo Agostini for Master of National Comics, an award that aims to honor artists who have dedicated themselves to Brazilian comics for at least 25 years. In 2011, Ikoma also launched the webcomic series Mary+QI, A Garota Cibernética.
