= Manoel Victor Filho =

Brazilian painter, illustrator and cartoonist (1927–1995)

- Born: Manoel Victor de Azevedo Filho; 9 August 1927; São Paulo
- Died: 26 March 1995; São Paulo
- Occupations: Painter, comics artist, illustrator, cartoonist
- Awards: Troféu Angelo Agostini for Master of National Comics (1998)

Manoel Victor Filho (São Paulo, August 9, 1927 — São Paulo, March 26, 1995) was a Brazilian painter, illustrator and cartoonist. In 1942, he studied at the Art Student's League of New York with Frank Riley. When he returned to Brazil, he became one of the main names in illustration and plastic arts in the country. In 1953, he was also the first illustrator to perform working live on Brazilian TV. He started working with comics in 1955, drawing for the publisher adaptations of literature scripted by his father, Manoel Victor. His best-known work was as an illustrator of Monteiro Lobato's work, an activity that began in the 1970s and lasted for 30 years. In 1971, he won the Jabuti Prize for best illustration. In 1998, he was awarded with the Prêmio Angelo Agostini for Master of National Comics, an award that aims to honor artists who have dedicated themselves to Brazilian comics for at least 25 years.
