= Paulo Caruso =

Brazilian cartoonist and sculptor (1949–2023)

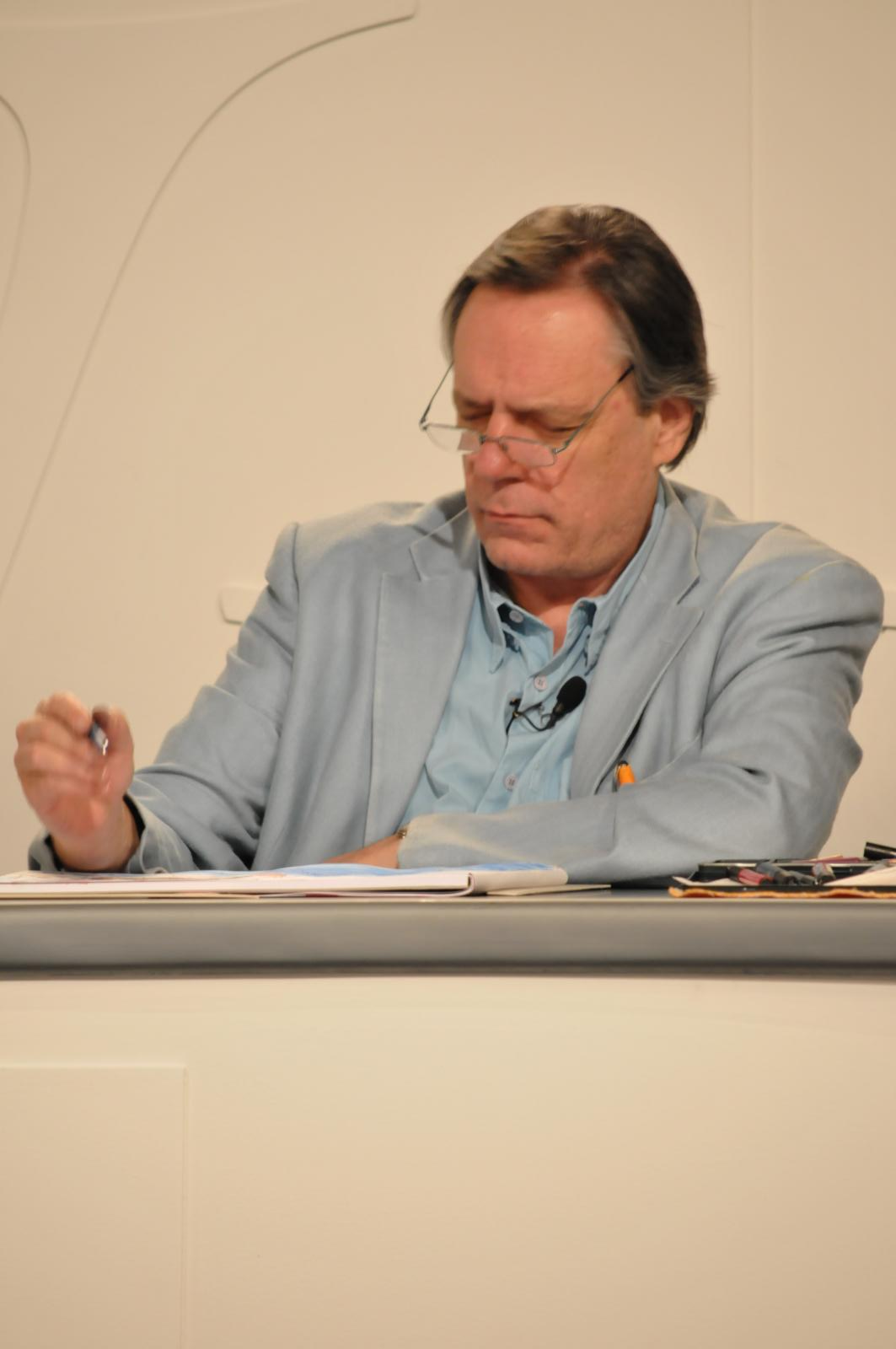
- Caruso in Roda Viva (2014)
- Born: Paulo José Hespanha Caruso; 6 December 1949; São Paulo, Brazil
- Died: 4 March 2023 (aged 73); São Paulo, Brazil
- Occupation: Cartoonist

Paulo José Hespanha Caruso (6 December 1949 – 4 March 2023) was a Brazilian satirical cartoonist, caricaturist, illustrator, and television personality.

== Life and career ==
Born in São Paulo, the twin brother of fellow cartoonist Chico, in 1976 Caruso graduated in architecture at the University of São Paulo. He started his career in the newspaper Diário Popular in the late 1960s. He is best known for the comic strip "Avenida Brasil", which ran for 25 years in the weekly magazine Istoé, and was also published in Jornal do Brasil and collected in several books. He collaborated to major magazines and newspapers as well as with alternative press publications such as O Pasquim and Movimento.

Caruso was also well known for being a regular since its start in 1986 of the TV Cultura talk show Roda Viva, in which he used caricaturing the guests in real time during their interviews; his last appearance in the show was on 2 January 2023. He was also a musician, the co-founder of the Muda Brasil Tancredo Jazz Band and of the comedy music group Conjunto Nacional band.

During his career Caruso received several awards and honours, notably the award for best cartoonist from the Associação Paulista de Críticos de Arte (APCA) in 1994, the Troféu HQ Mix for the book São Paulo por Paulo Caruso in 2003, and the Prêmio Angelo Agostini for Master of National Comics in 2005.

== Death ==
He died of intestinal cancer on 4 March 2023, at the age of 73. President Luiz Inácio Lula da Silva mourned his death, noting "his sharp drawing and his humour are already part of the national memory".
