= Moacy Cirne =

Brazilian poet and academic

- Born: Moacy Costa Cirne; 13 March 1943; São José do Seridó
- Died: 11 January 2014; Natal
- Occupations: Poet, writer, journalist, visual poet
- Awards: Troféu Angelo Agostini for Master of National Comics (2000)

Moacy Cirne (December 12, 1943 - January 11, 2014) was a Brazilian poet and researcher, considered the main Brazilian researcher about comics. In 1967, he was one of the founders of the movement and vanguard Poema/Processo. He was also editor of the fanzine Balaio Porreta. In academic life, he specialized in graphic narratives and poetry, having written several works on these two themes. He was one of the pioneers in research on comics in Brazil, having released his first book on the subject in 1970, A explosão criativa dos quadrinhos, which was followed by several others. Cirne was also professor at the Department of Social Communication of Fluminense Federal University. In 2000, he was awarded with the Prêmio Angelo Agostini for Master of National Comics, an award that aims to honor artists who have dedicated themselves to Brazilian comics for at least 25 years.
