= Deodato Borges =

- Born: Deodato Taumaturgo Borges; 20 January 1934; João Pessoa
- Died: 25 August 2014; João Pessoa
- Occupations: Journalist, comics creator, radio personality
- Children: Mike Deodato
- Awards: Troféu Angelo Agostini for Master of National Comics (1999)

Deodato Taumaturgo Borges (Campina Grande, January 20, 1934 – João Pessoa, August 25, 2014) was a Brazilian journalist, broadcaster and comics creator. In the late 1950s, Borges created the radio series As Aventuras do Flama for Borborema AM radio station, in Campina Grande, starring the superhero Flama that the author had created while still in his childhood. With the great success of the program, Borges created in 1963 a Flama's comic book that attracted a legion of fans and became one of the first Brazilian comics superheroes.

In addition to his radio work, Borges was also general director of Diários Associados in Paraíba state and was TV and radio director. In 1973, he became the culture editor of the newspaper O Norte, in João Pessoa, introducing comic strips. In the 1980s, together with his son Mike Deodato, he created the sci-fi saga 3000 Anos Depois, reprinted in the American market as Fallout 3000, where he was credited as Mike Deodato Sr., as well as other works. In 1999, he was awarded with the Prêmio Angelo Agostini for Master of National Comics, an award that aims to honor artists who have dedicated themselves to Brazilian comics for at least 25 years.
