= João Batista Queiroz =

Brazilian comics artist and illustrator

- Area: Cartoonist
- Notable works: Álbum Infantil
- Awards: Prêmio Angelo Agostini for Master of National Comics

João Batista Queiroz is a Brazilian comics artist and illustrator. He started his career working as an illustrator in the magazines of the La Selva group. In the 1950s, he was responsible for the comic books of popular personalities at the time, such as the clown duos Arrelia & Pimentinha and Fuzarca & Torresmo and the actors Grande Otelo and Oscarito. In the 1970s, he created the children's character Zuzuca for the publication Álbum Infantil. In the 1980s, he worked with the comic book of the comedy group Os Trapalhões. In 1988, he was awarded with the Prêmio Angelo Agostini for Master of National Comics, an award that aims to honor artists who have dedicated themselves to Brazilian comics for at least 25 years.
