= Primaggio Mantovi =

Italian-Brazilian comics artist

- Born: January 18, 1945 (age 81) San Vito dei Normanni, Italy
- Area: Cartoonist
- Notable works: Sacarrolha; Dr. Zoo, o Veterinário
- Awards: Prêmio Angelo Agostini for Master of National Comics

Primaggio Mantovi (born San Vito dei Normanni, January 18, 1945) is an Italian-born Brazilian comics artist. Born in Italy, he moved with his family to Brazil at age nine. He began his career at publishing house Rio Gráfica Editora (RGE) in 1964, where he produced around 200 magazine covers and wrote and illustrated comics about western (Rocky Lane) and humor (Beetle Bailey). In 1972, he released his own character at RGE, the clown Sacarrolha, who had his own comic book that was quite successful at the time. Mantovi also created the comic strip Dr. Zoo, o Veterinário, which was published in newspapers in Brazil, Cuba and the Netherlands. From 1973, Mantovi also worked with Disney comics at editora Abril, being responsible for the coordination of "Escolinha Disney" ("Disney School"), an Abril project that sought to create new talent for the then great Brazilian production of Disney comics. In 1991, he was awarded with the Prêmio Angelo Agostini for Master of National Comics, an award that aims to honor artists who have dedicated themselves to Brazilian comics for at least 25 years.
