= Lyrio Aragão =

Prolific Brazilian comics writer and artist in mid-century national publishing

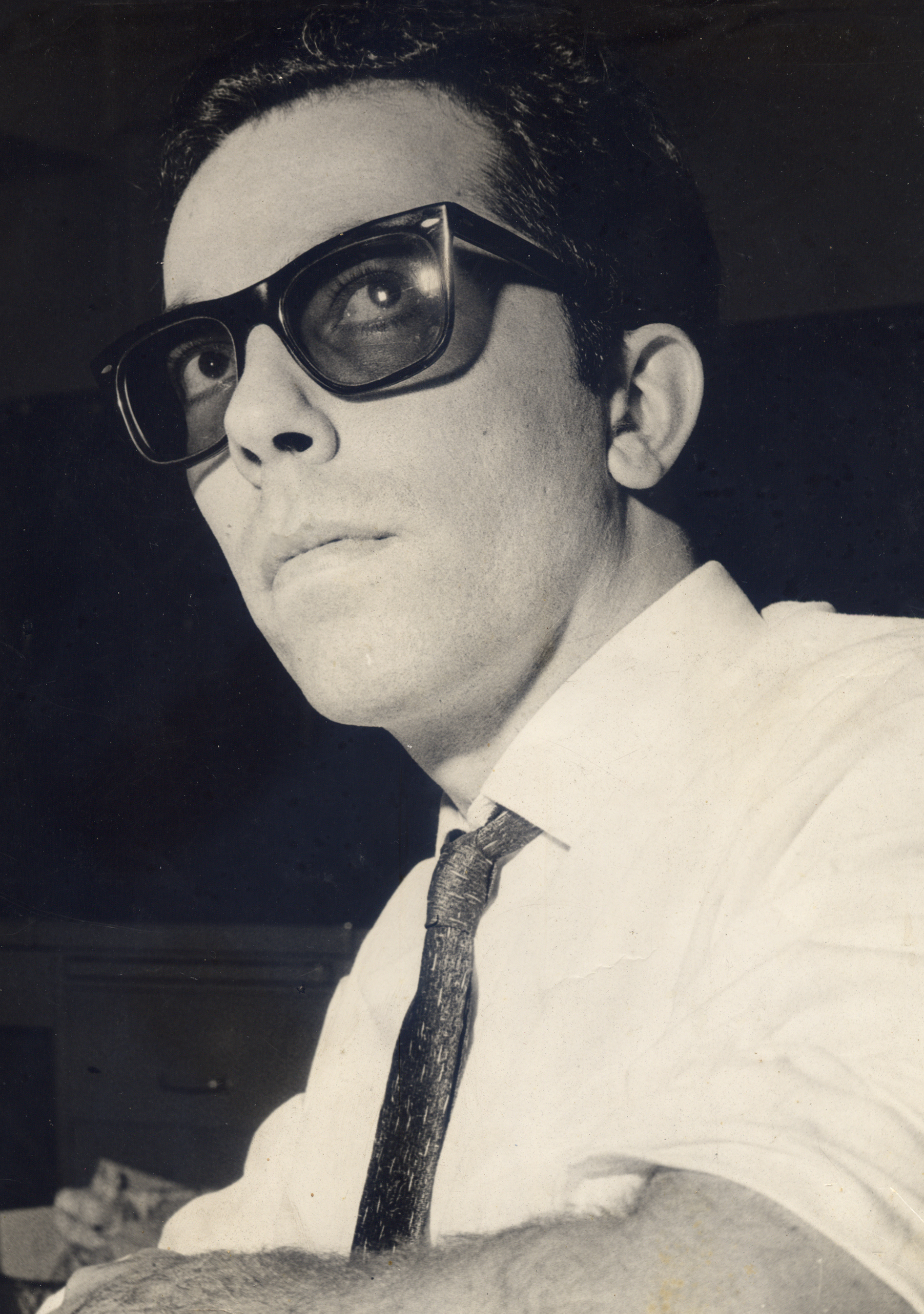
- Born: Lyrio Aragão Dias; 9 November 1933; Ibirá
- Died: 1968 (aged 34–35); São Paulo
- Occupation: Comics artist, police officer
- Awards: Troféu Angelo Agostini for Master of National Comics (1994)

Lyrio Aragão (1933 - 1968) was a Brazilian comic book artist and policeman. He began his career in the 1960s at the October publishing house as an assistant to Jayme Cortez. He created several characters from police comics, inspired by his work as a police investigator, such as Detetive Otávio and Detetive Teobaldo (the latter was distributed to newspapers by Mauricio de Sousa Produções). He also worked at Editora Abril with Disney comics and at D-Arte publishing house in the horror comics Mestres do Terror and Calafrio. In 1994, he was posthumously awarded with the Prêmio Angelo Agostini for Master of National Comics, an award that aims to honor artists who have dedicated themselves to Brazilian comics for at least 25 years.
