= Renato Canini =

- Born: February 22, 1936
- Died: October 30, 2013 (aged 77)
- Area: Cartoonist
- Notable works: José Carioca
- Awards: Prêmio Angelo Agostini for Master of National Comics

Renato Vinícius Canini (February 22, 1936 — October 30, 2013) was a Brazilian illustrator, known for his work in publications like O Pasquim and Pancada, and for Editora Abril, where he drew Disney comics, chiefly José Carioca. He gave the character a more authorial style, and a more Brazilian identity.

== Career ==
Canini' first job was at age 21, for Rio Grande do Sul state's Secretary of Education and Culture, doing illustrations for the children's magazine Cacique. When the publication ceased, Canini kept doing engineering technical drawings until he completed ten years as a civil servant, a thing he despised. He also collaborated for the newspaper Correio do Povo, TV Piratini and alternative publications.

In 1967 Canini was invited by a Methodist pastor (Rev. Willian Schisler Filho - Dico), to be an illustrator for the children's magazine Bem-Te-Vi, and moved to São Paulo. Two years later, he got an opportunity to work for Editora Abril, first in the magazine Recreio, and then Disney comics.

=== Canini's José Carioca ===
In the beginning of the 1970s, José Carioca stories in Brazil were limited to reissues of 1940-1950 American-made comics, or adaptations of another characters' comics, like Mickey or Donald Duck. Canini, back to Porto Alegre, started to draw José Carioca's stories.

Canini adapted the character to a more modern setting, changing the character's suit and bow tie for a T-shirt. Together with other artists and writers he helped bring the ambiance of the story to a perceived more authentic Brazilian context. But it was Canini's simple, loose and economical drawing style that departed his creations from Disney's standards. Canini's stories were not credited, but he would always sign his work anyway, hiding his name on background ads and product labels throughout the story.

Canini drew José Carioca for five years, creating some 135 stories, some also written by himself, until publishers say that his drawing style was departing away too much from the Disney style, not selling as well as before and finally cancelling the production.

Canini kept drawing comics, creating original characters like the cowboy Kaktus Kid, he psychiatrist Dr. Fraud, and the Brazilian native Tibica.

== See also ==
- Inducks
- Ivan Saidenberg
