= Aylton Thomaz =

Brazilian comics artist

- Born: Aylton Thomaz de Oliveira; 8 December 1934; Rio de Janeiro
- Died: 10 February 2009; Rio de Janeiro
- Occupations: Comics artist, painter
- Awards: Troféu Angelo Agostini for Master of National Comics (1991)

Aylton Thomaz (December 8, 1934, Rio de Janeiro – February 10, 2009, Rio de Janeiro) was a Brazilian comics artist and painter. He began his career at EBAL publishing house in 1953 drawing comics literary adaptations. He also worked at La Selva publishing house, with horror stories and actors Oscarito and Grande Otelo's comic books. From the 1970s onwards, he began to devote himself mainly to painting, having held several exhibitions over the years. In 1991, he was awarded with the Prêmio Angelo Agostini for Master of National Comics, an award that aims to honor artists who have dedicated themselves to Brazilian comics for at least 25 years.
