= Messias de Mello =

Brazilian illustrator

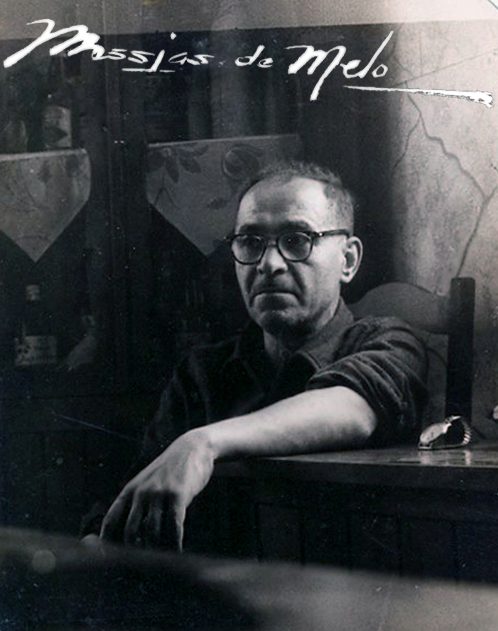
- Messias de Mello in his studio in 1954.
- Born: Manoel Messias de Mello; 16 August 1904; Maceió
- Died: 18 October 1994; São Paulo
- Occupations: Penciller, cartoonist, painter, illustrator
- Employer: A Gazeta
- Children: Daniel Messias
- Relatives: Judas Isgorogota
- Awards: Troféu Angelo Agostini for Master of National Comics (1985)
- Website: www.messiasdemello.com.br

Manoel Messias de Mello (Maceió, August 16h, 1904 - São Paulo, October 18th, 1994), better known as Messias de Mello, was a Brazilian illustrator and painter. Born in Alagoas, he moved to São Paulo in the 1930s. He started working as designer of posters and shop windows, until he got a job as an illustrator at Gazeta Juvenil, a children's supplement for the newspaper A Gazeta.

== Career ==
At Gazeta Juvenil, where he worked between 1936 and 1939, Messias de Mello created comic book characters and illustrated several classics of literature, such as The Three Musketeers, The Man in the Iron Mask, Robinson Crusoe, among others. In the following years, he worked for several Brazilian comic book publishers, creating comics of his own and also based on personalities such as clowns Arrelia and Pimentinha and actors Oscarito and Grande Otelo, as well as comics about Spiritism.

== Awards ==
In 1985, he was awarded the Prêmio Angelo Agostini for Master of National Comics, an award that aims to honor artists who have dedicated themselves to Brazilian comics for at least 25 years.

Messias de Mello was work with oil and acrylic paintings, having participated in several exhibitions and won several awards.
