= Eugenio Colonnese =

Italian-Brazilian comics artist

- Born: Eugenio Antonio Colonnese; 3 September 1929; Fuscaldo
- Died: 8 August 2008 (aged 78); Santo André
- Occupation: Comics artist
- Awards: Troféu Angelo Agostini for Master of National Comics (1985); Prêmio "A Life Dedicated to Comics" (Troféu Bigorna) (2008)

Eugenio Colonnese (Fuscaldo, 3 September 1929 – Santo André, 8 August 2008) was an Italian-born Brazilian comic artist.

Son of a Brazilian mother (who is African, Portuguese and Indigenous) and Italian father, Colonnese moved to Argentina as a child, where he began his career in 1949, working for several Argentine magazines. He moved to Brazil in 1964. Three years later, he created the Estúdio D-Arte with Rodolfo Zalla, with whom he produced several comic books for several Brazilian publishers.

In 1967, Colonnese created his main characters: Mirza, a Mulher-Vampira ("Mirza, the Vampire Woman") and O Morto do Pântano ("The Swamp Dead"), which, although they have similarities, respectively, to Vampirella and Swamp Thing, were created some years before these characters. Colonnese worked mainly with horror comics, but he also worked with other genres and did illustration for educational and advertising comics.

In 1985, he was awarded the Prêmio Angelo Agostini for Master of National Comics, an award that aims to honor artists who have dedicated themselves to Brazilian comics for at least 25 years.
