= Prêmio DB Artes =

- Awarded for: Brazilian comics
- Sponsored by: Divisão Brasileira de Artes
- Location: Aracaju
- Country: Brazil
- First award: 2003
- Final award: 2010
- Website: Link

Prêmio DB Artes (DB Artes Award) was a Brazilian award aimed at independent comics organized by Divisão Brasileira de Artes studio and awarded to authors, personalities and works between 2003 and 2010. The award ceremony took place during HQ Festival, a comics festival held annually in Aracaju.

The award (called DB Artes Independentes in its first three editions) was open to all Brazilian independent authors, especially fanzine artists. Applications were made by sending two copies of the work by mail, along with the registration form. Submitting the work guaranteed participation in all relevant categories, but it was not possible for the same person to win in two different categories. Voting was carried out by e-mail and open to readers, collectors, fanzines editors and other people linked to Brazilian comics.

In 2007 and 2008 the HQ Festival was not held and the Prêmio DB Artes was also postponed, returning only in 2009. The last edition of the event and also of the award was the following year.
