= Adolfo Aizen =

Russian-born Brazilian journalist and editor

- Born: June 10, 1907; Dnipro
- Died: May 10, 1991 (aged 83); Rio de Janeiro
- Occupation: Journalist, publisher
- Awards: Troféu Angelo Agostini for Master of National Comics (2000)

Adolfo Aizen (Ekaterinoslav, June 10, 1907 – Rio de Janeiro, May 10, 1991) was a Russian-born Brazilian journalist and editor. He grew up in Salvador, moving to Rio de Janeiro at the age of 15. In Rio, he worked at the publisher O Malho, responsible for the magazine O Tico-Tico, the first magazine to publish comics in Brazil. In 1945, Aizen founded Editora Brasil-América Limitada (EBAL), which would become the most important Brazilian comic book publishing house until the 1980s (the publisher was closed in 1995), being responsible for publishing comics like Superman, Batman and Prince Valiant, among others. In 2000, Aiezen was awarded posthumously with the title of "Master of the National Comics" by Prêmio Angelo Agostini.
