= Mike Deodato =

Brazilian comic book artist

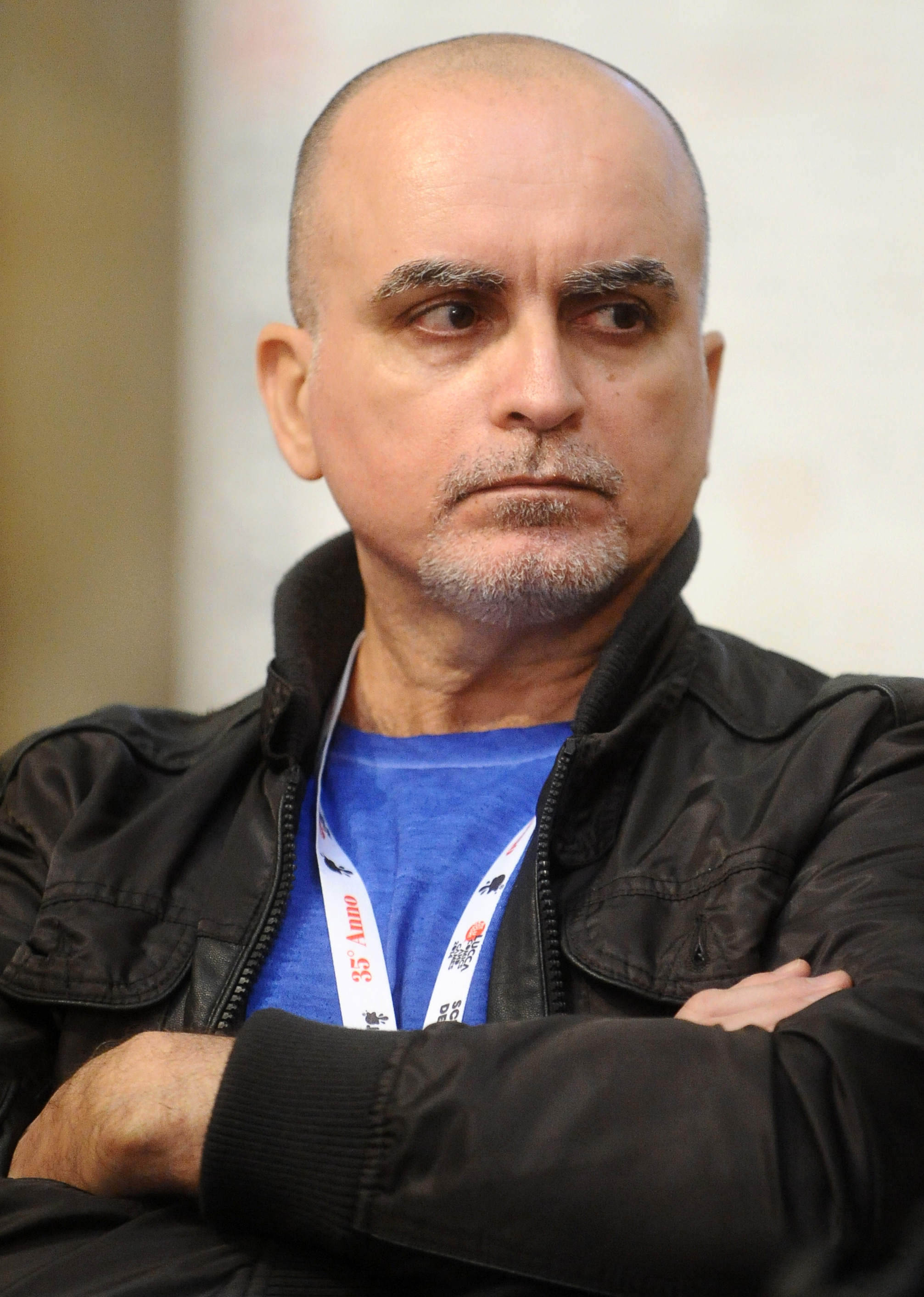
- Mike Deodato at Lucca Comics & Games 2014
- Born: Deodato Taumaturgo Borges Filho; May 23, 1963 (age 63) Campina Grande, Paraíba, Brazil
- Area: Penciller
- Pseudonym: Mike Deodato Jr.
- Notable works: Wonder Woman; Dark Avengers; Infinity Wars; Thunderbolts; The Incredible Hulk; The Amazing Spider-Man

Deodato Taumaturgo Borges Filho, better known by his pen name Mike Deodato (/ˌdiːəˈdætoʊ/ DEE-ə-DAT-oh; born May 23, 1963), is a Brazilian comic book artist.

== Early life ==
Mike Deodato was born on May 23, 1963, in Campina Grande, Paraíba, Brazil. He is the son of comic artist Deodato Borges.

== Career ==
One of Deodato's first works was a 1993 photo-realistic comic book adaptation of the television series Beauty and the Beast published by Innovation Publishing. Deodato became famous in the North American comic book industry for his work with writer William Messner-Loebs on Wonder Woman, during which he co-created the character Artemis of Bana-Mighdall. After his Wonder Woman project, he became the penciller of Thor, where he worked firstly with writer Warren Ellis and then again with writer William Messner-Loebs. Later he drew Glory for Rob Liefeld's Extreme Studios at Image Comics and Maximum Press.

While his style in the mid-1990s was highly reminiscent of Jim Lee, he has recently changed to a more simplified, photo-realistic and sometimes moody style. His first work with this new artistic identity was The Incredible Hulk, written by Bruce Jones. Since then, he has worked on the Doctor Strange spin-off Witches and became the regular penciller of The Amazing Spider-Man and New Avengers. Deodato then took over as regular penciller for the Marvel title Thunderbolts with issue 110, once again collaborating with Warren Ellis. Deodato then became the regular artist for the Dark Avengers ongoing series which came out of the conclusion of Secret Invasion. With writer Ed Brubaker, he launched the ongoing series Secret Avengers in May 2010, before returning to New Avengers.

In 2012 he became the penciller of The Avengers and The New Avengers. Deodato worked with Jason Aaron on the eight-issue flagship comic of Marvel's 2014 crossover storyline, Original Sin. In 2017 Deodato drew the Astonishing X-Men ongoing series with writer Charles Soule. He drew the Infinity Wars limited series in 2018 with writer Gerry Duggan.

In March 2019 Deodato announced that he would leave Marvel after his upcoming run on Savage Avengers. Following the expiration of his Marvel contract, he worked with DC to create a Batman-centric Comic-Con Experience 2019 poster. The poster, colored by Marcelo Maiolo, will honor Batman's 80th anniversary.

In March 2020 Deodato and writer J. Michael Straczynski started the series The Resistance. The series were one of four inaugural releases comprising a new shared universe within the publisher's Upshot imprint.

== Bibliography ==
=== Dark Horse Comics ===
- Lady Death vs. Vampirella
- Star Wars Tales 7
- Xena #9–14

=== DC Comics ===
- Batgirl Annual #1 (2000)
- Batman #570 (1999)
- Batman 80-Page Giant #3 (among other artists) (2000)
- Batman: Shadow of the Bat #87 (1999)
- Detective Comics #736 (1999)
- Legends of the DC Universe (Wonder Woman) #4–5 (1998)
- Wonder Woman vol. 2 #0, 85, 90–100 (1994–1995)

=== Image Comics ===
- Glory #1–10 (among other artists) (1995–1996)
- Jade Warriors #1–3 (1999–2000)
- WildC.A.T.s #47 (along with Ed Benes) (1998)

=== Marvel Comics ===
- The Amazing Spider-Man (Spider-Man) #509–528; (Harry Osborn) #546 (2004–2008)
- Astonishing X-Men vol. 4 #2 (2017)
- Avengers #380–382, 384–385, 387–388, 390–391, 393–395, 397–399, 401-402 (1994–1996)
- Avengers vol. 4 #34 (2013)
- Avengers vol. 5 #9–13, 24, 37, 39, 41 (2013–2015)
- Avengers: The Crossing (1995)
- BrooklyKnight #1 (2012)
- Captain America #616–617 (among other artists) (2011)
- Dark Avengers #1–6, 9–16 (2009–2010)
- Dark Avengers/Uncanny X-Men: Exodus (along with Terry Dodson) (2009)
- Dream Police (2005)
- Elektra #1–19 (1996–1998); #-1 (1997, Flashback issue)
- Guardians of Knowhere #1–4 (2015)
- Incredible Hulk vol. 1 #447–453 (1996–1997)
- Incredible Hulk: Hercules Unleashed (1996)
- Incredible Hulk vol. 2 #50–54, 60–65, 70–72 (2003–2004)
- The Invincible Iron Man vol. 3 #6–14 (2016)
- Infinity Countdown #1–5 (2018)
- Infinity Countdown Prime #1 (2018)
- Infinity Wars #1–6 (2018)
- Infinity Wars Prime #1 (2018)
- Journey into Mystery #503–506, 508–511, #-1 (1996–1997)
- Moon Knight vol. 5 #20 (2008)
- New Avengers #17–20 (2006)
- New Avengers vol. 2 #9–30, 34 (2010–2012)
- New Avengers vol. 3 #7–12, 28, 32–33 (2013–2015)
- New Avengers Finale (among other artists) (2010)
- Old Man Logan #25–33 (2017)
- Original Sin #1–8 (2014)
- Punisher War Journal vol. 2 #4 (2007)
- Savage Avengers #1–5 (2019)
- Secret Avengers #1–4, 6–10, 12 (2010–2011)
- Spider-Man Unlimited #21–22 (1998)
- Star Wars vol. 2 #13–14 (2015)
- Star Wars: Vader Down #1 (2015)
- Thanos vol. 2 #1–6 (2016–2017)
- Thor vol. 1 #491-494, 496, 498–502 (1995-1996)
- Thor: The Legend #1 (1996)
- Thunderbolts #110–121 (2007–2008)
- Thunderbolts Prelude (1997, reprints team's first appearance in Incredible Hulk vol. 2, #449)
- Tigra #1–4 (2002)
- Ultimates Annual #2 (2006)
- Witches #1–4 (2004)
- Wolverine vol. 2 Annual #2 (2008)
- Wolverine: Origins #28–30 (2008–2009)
- X-Men: Legacy #212 (along with Scot Eaton) (2008)
- X-Men: Original Sin one-shot (2008)
- X-Men Unlimited #32 (2001)
- X.S.E., miniseries, #1–4 (1996–1997)

=== Other publishers ===
- Beauty and the Beast (Innovation)
- The Cartoon Art of Mike Deodato, Jr. Dec 2013 (Red Giant Entertainment)
- Death Kiss (Maximum Press)
- Lady Death #5–8 (Chaos!)
- Lady Death vs. Vampirella: Uncommon Ground (Chaos!)
- Lost in Space (Innovation)
- Mack Bolan: The Executioner (Innovation)
- Mike Deodato's Comics & Stories Summer 2014 (Red Giant Entertainment)
- Mike Deodato's Jade Warriors 2014 (Red Giant Entertainment)
- Mike Deodato Jr's Sketchbook (2014) (Red Giant Entertainment)
- Purgatori (Chaos!)
- Quantum Leap (Innovation)
- Samuree vol. 2 #3 (Continuity)
- Turok (Valiant)

=== Covers work ===
- A+X #1 (Variant Cover Only Marvel 2012)
- Astonishing X-Men #8 (Marvel, 2017–)
- Darth Vader Annual #2 (Marvel, 2017–)
- Marvel Legacy #1 (Variant Cover Only Marvel 2016)
- She-Hulk (vol. 2) #22-24, #27-36 (2007-2008)
- Prowler #10 (2016)

Preceded by John Ross	Wonder Woman artist 1994–1995	Succeeded by John Byrne
Preceded by Angel Medina	The Incredible Hulk artist 1996–1997	Succeeded by Adam Kubert
Preceded by John Romita Jr.	The Amazing Spider-Man artist 2004–2006	Succeeded by Ron Garney
Preceded by Steve McNiven	New Avengers artist 2006	Succeeded by Howard Chaykin
Preceded by Javier Saltares	Moon Knight artist 2008	Succeeded by Mark Texeira
Preceded by Tom Grummett	Thunderbolts artist 2007–2008	Succeeded by Fernando Blanco
