= Gedeone Malagola =

Brazilian comics artist and editor

- Born: July 7, 1924 São Paulo, Brazil
- Died: September 15, 2008 (aged 84) Jundiaí, Brazil
- Areas: Cartoonist, Editor
- Awards: Prêmio Angelo Agostini for Master of National Comics

Gedeone Malagola (São Paulo, July 7, 1924 – Jundiaí, September 15, 2008) was a Brazilian comics artist and editor. He started his career in the 1940s, drawing for the newspaper A Marmita. He worked for several comic book publishers until he founded his own, Editora Júpiter. His main works were in the 1960s at GEP (Gráfica Editora Penteado), where he created the superheroes Raio Negro (his best-known character), Hydroman and Homem Lua. In the late 1960s, Malagola wrote unofficial stories of the X-Men for GEP (the publisher had the characters' rights in Brazil, but the licensed stories were not enough for the number of pages of the Brazilian magazine, so they asked their artists to create - without Marvel's authorization - stories to fill the space). In 1986, he was awarded the Prêmio Angelo Agostini for Master of National Comics, an award that aims to honor artists who have dedicated themselves to Brazilian comics for at least 25 years.
