= Henrique Magalhães =

Brazilian academic and cartoonist

Henrique Magalhães (João Pessoa, August 17, 1957) is a Brazilian professor, researcher, editor and comics artist. In 1975, he created the comic book character Maria, with stories focused on political criticism. Between 1985 and 1988, he published the fanzine Marca de Fantasia, which was the name chosen for the publishing house he founded in 1995. The Marca de Fantasia publishing house specialized in academic books about comics and fanzines. In 1994, Magalhães won the Troféu HQ Mix of "Best Theoretical Book" for O Que É Fanzine, which was published by Brasiliense.
