= Getulio Delphim =

Brazilian comics artist

- Born: June 16, 1938 (age 88) Rio de Janeiro
- Areas: Cartoonist, Penciller
- Awards: Prêmio Angelo Agostini for Master of National Comics

Getulio Delphim (born Rio de Janeiro, June 16, 1938) - sometimes Delphin or Delfin - is a Brazilian comics artist and illustrator. He began his career at the age of 15 at Rio Gráfica publishing house as a comics penciller and magazine cover designer. At 18, he was working for the publishing houses Outubro and La Selva. One of his main works was in the superhero's comic book Capitão 7. In 1970s, he stopped working only with comics, dedicating himself to advertising illustration. In 1994, he was awarded with the Prêmio Angelo Agostini for Master of National Comics, an award that aims to honor artists who have dedicated themselves to Brazilian comics for at least 25 years.
