= Flavio Colin =

Brazilian comic artist and illustrator

- Born: Flávio Barbosa Mavignier Colin; 22 June 1930; Rio de Janeiro
- Died: 13 August 2002 (aged 72); Rio de Janeiro
- Occupation: Comics artist
- Awards: Troféu Angelo Agostini for Master of National Comics (1987); Prêmio Angelo Agostini for Best Penciller (2001); Prêmio Angelo Agostini for Best Penciller (2002); Prêmio Angelo Agostini for Best Release (1995); Prêmio Angelo Agostini for Best Release (Fawcett, 2001)

Flavio Colin (Rio de Janeiro, June 22, 1930 - Rio de Janeiro, August 13, 2002) was a Brazilian comic artist and illustrator, considered one of the most important comic artists in Brazil. He began his career in the 1950s with an adaptation for the comic book radio series As Aventuras do Anjo, influenced by Milton Caniff, but began to gain prominence with the development of his own stylized artist style. In 1987, he was awarded with the Prêmio Angelo Agostini for Master of National Comics, an award that aims to honor artists who have dedicated themselves to Brazilian comics for at least 25 years. He also won the Troféu HQ Mix in 1994 and 1995. Flávio Colin died in Rio de Janeiro on 2002.
