= Ota (cartoonist) =

Brazilian journalist and cartoonist (1954–2021)

- Born: Otacílio Costa d’Assunção Barros; July 4, 1954 Rio de Janeiro, Brazil
- Died: September 24, 2021 (aged 67) Tijuca, Brazil
- Area: Cartoonist
- Notable works: Os Birutas
- Awards: Troféu HQ Mix; Prêmio Angelo Agostini

Otacílio Costa d’Assunção Barros (July 4, 1954 – September 24, 2021), better known as Ota, was a Brazilian journalist, cartoonist, comics artist and editor.

== Biography ==
He was born in Rio de Janeiro, and started his career in 1970 at Editora Brasil-América Limitada (EBAL), then the largest Brazilian comic book publishing house. He also published independent comics in the 1970s, such as the comic strip Os Birutas. In 1974, working at Vecchi publishing house, he became editor of the Brazilian edition of Mad magazine, a position he continued to hold in other publishing houses that published Mad: Record (1984–2000), Mythos (2000–2006) and Panini (2008). He left the magazine after the seventh edition of the Panini's version due to creative differences with Raphael Fernandes, who took care of the foreign material (Ota was only editor of the national material in Panini's Mad). Ota won the Troféu HQ Mix as best writer in 1995 and the Prêmio Angelo Agostini as "Master of the National Comics" in 2003.

Ota was found dead on September 24, 2021, in his apartment in Tijuca, near Rio de Janeiro.
