= Julio Shimamoto =

Brazilian comic artist

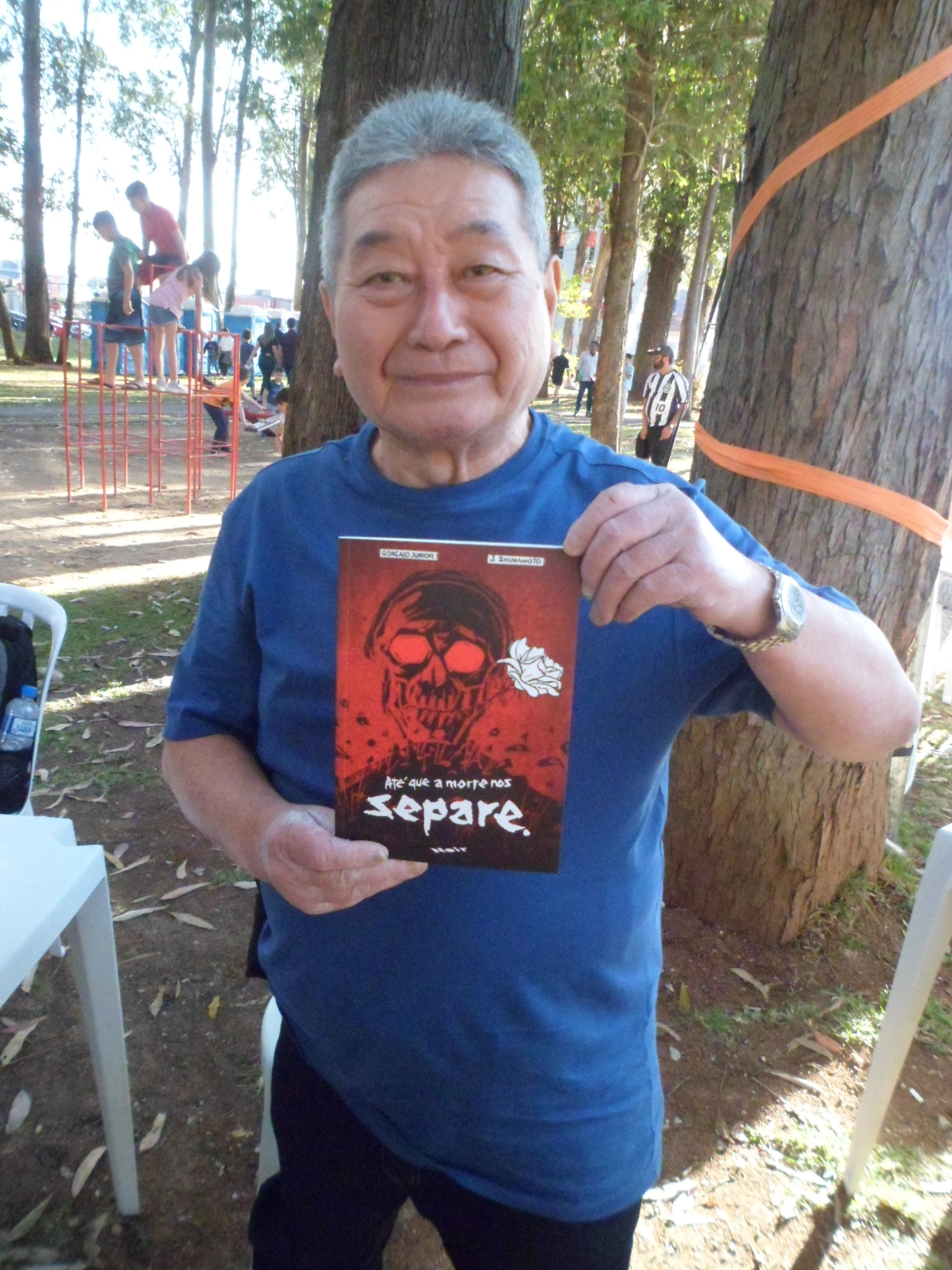
- Julio Shimamoto at 2018 Bienal de Quadrinhos de Curitiba
- Born: Julio Yoshinobu Shimamoto; 13 May 1939; Borborema
- Occupation: Comics artist, storyboard artist, painter
- Awards: Troféu Angelo Agostini for Master of National Comics (1986); Prêmio "A Life Dedicated to Comics" (Troféu Bigorna) (2010); Prêmio Angelo Agostini for Best Penciller (2003); Prêmio Angelo Agostini for Best Release (2003); Special honor (Prêmio DB Artes) (2010)
- Website: www.julioshimamoto.com.br

Julio Yoshinobu Shimamoto (born Borborema, May 13th, 1939), better known as Julio Shimamoto or Shima, is a Brazilian comic artist of Japanese descent. He started his career in the 1950s in the superhero comic book Capitão 7. He has worked in almost all comic book publishers in Brazil in 1960s and 1970s, such as La Selva, Taika, Outubro, Ebal, Vecchi, Grafipar, Abril, among many others. His main works are Musashi I and Musashi II (2003), about the samurai Miyamoto Musashi, and Subs (2006). One of the main themes of his comics is the samurai (in fact, Shimamoto claims to be descended from samurai), having made the first story on the subject in Brazil: Os Fantasmas do Rincão Maldito, published in 1961. Shimamoto continues to produce new comics even with more than 80 years old, having received several tributes and exhibitions about his work. In 1986, he was awarded with the Prêmio Angelo Agostini for Master of National Comics, an award that aims to honor artists who have dedicated themselves to Brazilian comics for at least 25 years.
