= Rodolfo Zalla =

Argentine comics artist

- Born: July 20, 1931 Buenos Aires, Argentina
- Died: June 19, 2016 (aged 84) São Paulo, Brazil
- Area: Cartoonist
- Notable works: Targo, O Vingador and O Escorpião
- Awards: Prêmio Angelo Agostini for Master of National Comics

Rodolfo Zalla (Buenos Aires, July 20, 1931 – São Paulo, June 19, 2016) was an Argentine comics artist. He started drawing comics while still in Argentina in 1953, but his career gained prominence after moving to Brazil with fellow comic artist José Delbo in 1963. He started producing comic strips of characters such as Targo, O Vingador and O Escorpião. He has worked for several comic book publishers and has produced stories in various genres, such as war and terror. He also produced Disney Comics about Zorro for editora Abril. In 1985, he was awarded the Prêmio Angelo Agostini for Master of National Comics, an award that aims to honor artists who have dedicated themselves to Brazilian comics for at least 25 years. He remained active drawing comics until his death in 2016, at 84 years old.
