= Monica e a Sereia do Rio =

1987 Brazilian animated film

- Theatrical release poster
- Directed by: Mauricio de Sousa
- Written by: Mário Matoso Neto; Arnaldo Galvão
- Based on: Monica and Friends by Mauricio de Sousa
- Starring: Marli Bortoletto; Angélica Santos; Elza Gonçalves; Paulo Camargo; Orlando Viggiani; Tetê Espíndola
- Edited by: José Aroaldo Ferreira
- Music by: Silvia Góes; Hélio Saintsteban; Márcio Araújo de Sousa; Maria Beatriz Pacca; Arnaldo Black; Tetê Espíndola
- Production company: Mauricio de Sousa Produções
- Distributed by: Embrafilme
- Release date: 7 February 1987
- Running time: 60 minutes
- Country: Brazil
- Language: Portuguese

Monica e a Sereia do Rio is a 1987 Brazilian animated film directed by Mauricio de Sousa and Walter Hugo Khouri. It is the fourth film based on the Monica and Friends comic book series, created by Mauricio de Sousa. The film consists of four stories and features the participation of singer Tetê Espíndola, who appears in live-action alongside the animated characters. The scenes were filmed at the Rio Quente lodge in Goiás. For this movie, Mauricio followed the structure of his first feature film, dividing it into separate stories. The final segment, "A Sereia do Rio", was inspired by an animated short from the early 1980s, originally intended for broadcast on TV Globo.

Monica e a Sereia do Rio was released in theaters on February 7, 1987, and was later re-released on VHS on at least two occasions. The film received mixed reviews from critics; while it was recommended for children, technical aspects, acting, and costumes were subject to criticism. It was screened at the Gramado Film Festival and the Brasília Festival of Brazilian Cinema. Additionally, its behind-the-scenes production was adapted into a comic strip for Monica magazine.

== Plot ==
The story begins when Monica opens a door and enters an alternate world. Fascinated by the music she hears, she searches for the singer and finds a fairy (Tetê Espíndola). Monica mentions that she enjoys telling stories and begins the first of four, "A Gruta do Diabo", in which Jimmy Five and Smudge explore a cave but are taken to learn about the punishments of hell.

After finishing the story, Monica looks for the fairy again, now transformed into a jaguar, which leads to the second story, "O Jacaré de Estimação." In this segment, a young alligator escapes from a zoo truck and ends up in Jimmy Five's room, where he takes care of it as though it were a lizard.

The fairy reappears next in the form of a macaw, introducing the third story, "O Tocador de Sinos." This tale features a giant church sexton whom Jimmy Five and Smudge meet, discovering his hidden musical talent.

Finally, the fourth story, "A Sereia do Rio", begins. In this segment, Tetê appears as a mermaid, singing the theme song. Later, Monica captures a mermaid from the sea, but Jimmy Five attempts to exploit her for commercial purposes, which hurts the mermaid's feelings. Monica stands up for the mermaid, defending her from exploitation.

== Cast ==
Tetê Espíndola appears in live-action in Monica e a Sereia do Rio. Below are the main voice actors featured in the film:

- Marli Bortoletto as Monica
- Angélica Santos as Jimmy Five
- Elza Gonçalves as Maggy
- Paulo Cavalcante as Smudge
- Orlando Viggiani as Franklin

== Background and release ==
The first two feature films based on Turma da Monica by Mauricio de Sousa — The Adventures of Monica and Friends (1982) and The Princess and the Robot (1984) — were relatively successful. The first was divided into multiple stories, while the second told a single narrative. Mauricio ultimately preferred the format divided into stories, as these segments could later be shown individually on television. He adopted this approach for his subsequent film, The New Adventures of Monica and Friends (1986), and continued with it for Monica e a Sereia do Rio. For this film, Mauricio aimed to create a musical, inspired by children's increasing interest in music videos. After considering several options, he chose Tetê Espíndola as the lead performer. Portraying a mermaid, she appears in live-action sequences interacting with the animated characters.

During the idle time of the Black & White & Color animation studio, which Mauricio had acquired in the early 1980s for producing commercials, short five-minute animations were created with the hope that TV Globo would include them in its programming. However, his favorite, "A Sereia do Rio", was rejected by Boni. Mauricio later drew inspiration from this short for Monica e a Sereia do Rio. The scenes featuring Tetê Espíndola as a mermaid were filmed at Rio Quente lodge in Goiás, under the direction of Walter Hugo Khouri. Although Khouri primarily directed films for audiences aged sixteen and older, he expressed an interest in making a children's film. In this case, he directed only the live-action scenes, which lasted approximately thirteen minutes.

The script was written by Mário Mattoso Neto and Arnaldo Galvão. Monica e a Sereia do Rio premiered simultaneously in ten Brazilian cities, nine of which were state capitals, on February 7, 1987. (Note: They are: São Paulo, Santos, Rio de Janeiro, Belo Horizonte, Fortaleza, Recife, Salvador, Curitiba, Porto Alegre and Florianópolis.) The film was later released on VHS on at least two occasions: in late 1987 or early 1988 by Trans Vídeo as part of a promotional package containing three Monica and Friends VHS tapes, and in late 1998 by Publifolha as part of the collection "Clássicos da Turma da Monica".

== Reception and legacy ==
Monica e a Sereia do Rio received mixed reviews from critics. Risoleta Miranda, writing for Diário do Pará, described the film as a "good program for kids" and noted the novelty of having Walter Hugo Khouri as director, highlighting his "light direction" in contrast to his previous existentialist films. Jornal do Brasil pointed out "two inadequacies" in the film: the first being that Tetê Espíndola's singing did not align well with the narrative, and the second being Khouri's "apathetic direction in the live scenes," along with the poor choreography of the "unprepared children."

Rubens Ewald Filho wrote in A Tribuna that the film fulfilled its purpose of entertaining children and "filling a gap in the market," but did not enhance the artistic reputation of the production studio. He criticized the use of rotoscoping, which he found to yield only "reasonable" results, as well as Tetê Espíndola's costumes. Flávio Cândido, commenting in O Fluminense, jokingly remarked: "If it hadn't been for the crass mistake of placing the 'mermaid' in a river, since the mythological being is exclusive to the seas, the film would have been recommended for children."

In 1987, Monica e a Sereia do Rio was also screened at the Gramado Festival and the Brasília Festival of Brazilian Cinema. The behind-the-scenes footage of the film was adapted into the comic strip "Uma Aventura Cinematográfica", featured in issue no. 5 of Monica Magazine. In the comic strip, Khouri himself appears as a character.

== See also ==
- Monica and Friends
- Cine Gibi (Franchise)
- Cine Gibi
- Cine Gibi 2
