= Bidu – Caminhos =

2015 Brazilian graphic novel

Bidu - Caminhos

Publication information
- Publisher: Panini Comics
- Genre: Adventure
- Publication date: May 29, 2015
- Main character: Monica's Gang

Creative team
- Written by: Eduardo Damasceno and Luís Felipe Garrocho

Collected editions
- Bidu - Caminhos: ISBN 978-8583680277

Bidu – Caminhos is a 2015 Brazilian graphic novel written by Eduardo Damasceno and Luís Felipe Garrocho based on the Blu character from the Monica's Gang comic strip. It is part of the Graphic MSP series of graphic novels based on Maurício de Sousa characters.

== Synopsis ==
Amid an escape through the city's sewer system, Blu needs to decide whether he advances lonesome or returns to save the life of the bigger and threatening dog that helped him escape, but also responsible for the bandages that he carries on his body. The choice is not obvious. Blu is still on his way to becoming the famous lovely pet of Franklin.

== Other languages ==
In addition to Portuguese, Bidu – Caminhos has been translated into these languages.

Language	Local Title	Publisher	Source
French	Bidou – Une Vie de Chien	Vents d'Ouest	
