= Cine Gibi 2 =

2005 Brazilian film

- Directed by: José Márcio Nicolosi
- Based on: Monica's Gang by Mauricio de Sousa
- Produced by: Gisele Mota; Itsuo Nakashima
- Starring: Marli Bortoletto; Angélica Santos; Paulo Cavalcante; Elza Gonçalves; Sibele Toledo; Dirceu de Oliveira
- Music by: Márcio Araújo
- Production company: Mauricio de Sousa Produçoes
- Distributed by: Paramount Home Entertainment
- Release date: 7 September 2005 (Brazil)
- Running time: 64 minutes
- Country: Brazil
- Language: Portuguese

Cine Gibi 2 (English: Movie Comic 2) is a 2005 Brazilian film directed by José Márcio Nicolosi and produced by Mauricio de Sousa Produções. Based on the Monica and Friends comics by Mauricio de Sousa, who supervised the film, it is a sequel to Cine Gibi: O Filme and the second film in the franchise of the same name. The plot revolves around an invention by the character Franklin that turns comic books into movies. In total, seven stories are presented. Distributed by Paramount Home Entertainment on DVD and VHS, it was released on September 7, 2005. Cine Gibi 2 received a mixed reception from critics, similar to the first film. A sequel, Cine Gibi 3, was released in 2008.

== Synopsis ==
As in the first movie, the plot revolves around Franklin's new invention, a giant blender that projects comic books in the form of movies. In addition to Monica and Friends' main characters, Monica, Maggy, Jimmy Five, and Smudge, there is also Chuck Billy, who didn't appear in the first film. The stories contained, adapted from comic books, are "Os Tênis da Mônica", "O Baile Frank", "Poeirinha Mágica", "Chapeuzinho Vermelho 2", "O Sumiço de Todas as Mães", "Boas Maneiras" e "Hora da Onça Beber Água".

== Main cast ==
The main cast of Cine Gibi 2 is presented below.

- Marli Bortoletto - Monica
- Angélica Santos - Jimmy Five
- Paulo Cavalcante - Smudge
- Elza Gonçalves - Maggy
- Sibele Toledo - Franklin
- Dirceu de Oliveira - Chuck Billy

== Production and release ==
Cine Gibi 2 was directed by José Márcio Nicolosi and produced by Gisele Mota Souto and Itsuo Nakashima. It was executive-directed by Alice Keico Takeda and produced by Alice Cardozo de Almeida. The location and production company was Mauricio de Sousa Produções, owned by Mauricio de Sousa, creator of Monica and Friends and general supervisor of the film. The film's main song, “Vamos Todos ao Cinema” (Let's all go to the movies), was written by Marcio Araujo. Cine Gibi 2 is a sequel to Cine Gibi: O Filme, and is the second film in the series of the same name.

Cine Gibi 2 was not released in cinemas. With forty thousand DVD units put on sale and promoted by the Blockbuster chain of stores and pasta manufacturer Nissin, it was released on September 7th, and distributed by Paramount Pictures. As a gift, magnet cards featuring various Monica and Friends characters were included. As an extra, the DVD consists of a trivia game with Jimmy Five about the episodes, mini-biographies of the characters, sign language, and a vignette of Horácio 3D. The stories from the film were republished in Cine Gibi 2 - A Revista, released in the same month by Editora Globo. The release was praised by Marcus Ramone, from Universo HQ. The film was also released on VHS.

It was shown at the premiere of TV Pública on December 2, to showcase the cultural impact of Monica and Friends in the entertainment and education of children and adults in the country.” Cine Gibi 2 was made available on YouTube by the official Monica and Friends channel on April 11, 2013. It was included in the Looke Kids catalog in June 2016, and in the Netflix catalog on May 9, 2021. It is also available on iTunes.

== Reception ==
Cine Gibi 2 received an average reception from critics. Lúcia Valentim Rodrigues, in Folha de S. Paulo, gave the film a rating of one star out of three, commenting that it wasn't as good as the first: “It pays no tribute to cinema and, lacking freshness, it seems more like an aftermath of what was left out of the first feature”. She also added “Regrettably, the funniest scenes are with the chicken Giselda.” Rubens Ewald Filho told UOL Cinema that the film maintains the technical quality of animation of the first, (Note: In his review of the first film, Rubens criticized the technical quality.) “cleaner, but also more simplistic”, and gave it a rating of two stars out of five.

On December 5, 2008, the sequel to Cine Gibi 2, Cine Gibi 3, was released.

== See also ==
- Cine Gibi (franchise)
- Cine Gibi: O Filme
- Monica and Friends
