= List of Monica and Friends characters =

This is a list of characters from the Monica's Gang franchise, created by Brazilian cartoonist Maurício de Sousa. Note that only characters from the main series are detailed here. For characters from related publications, check the navigation box at the bottom of this page.

In 2011, in an internet chatroom, Maurício revealed that the character's neighborhood was inspired on the neighborhood of Cambuí, in the city of Campinas, where he lived for a few years. It's a place with lots of plants and trees, a soccer field (where the boys play), a garbage dumpster which Smudge used to play in (which is not the case in recent editions), and little to no asphalt.

Before Monica's debut in 1963, Maurício's initial characters were all male. After being accused of misogyny, he began creating his first female characters which were inspired by some of his own daughters.

== Main characters ==
The four main characters of Monica's Gang are:

- Monica (Mônica)
- Jimmy Five (Cebolinha "Little Onion")
- Smudge (Cascão)
- Maggy (Magali)

== Secondary characters ==
=== Franklin ===
Franklin (Franjinha, lit. Little Fringe Carlos Fernando Mendes) The child prodigy of the gang, being a preteen. He is a scientist who creates formulas, time machines and several fantastic devices in his laboratory that often fall into the hands of their friends creating serious problems. Jimmy Five takes advantage of his inventions multiple times to use them to defeat Monica, sometimes even convincing Franklin to take part on his plans to dominate the street. He owns of the puppy Blu, who has been his best friend since the first comic strips. Usually seen walking along with Bucky, Jeremiah, and Manezinho, which has been his friends since the earliest comics. He also has a secret love for Marina, often using their inventions to try to impress her. He is blond with a black bangs covering his forehead, usually wears black shorts, brown shoes, and a red shirt with a button (very similar to Jimmy Five's clothes), and occasionally also a white coat when in his laboratory. The character was originally based on Mauricio de Sousa himself as a child.

The character has been among one the most popular outside of the main quartet of protagonists. He was once listed as the third best character behind only Curly and Bug-a-Booo.

=== Bucky ===
Bucky (Titi, Cristian Tiago Soares de Lima) is Franklin's best friend and one of the older boys in the gang. He is arrogant, narcissistic and flirty. Bucky has the same teeth as Monica, but his friends rarely make fun of that. Bucky dates Annie, despite being seen flirting with other girls. In some stories, he ends up being rejected by other girls due to his infidelity. He is usually seen together Franklin, Jeremiah and Manezinho in most of the stories, sometimes forming the team of the older preteen boys known as the "Turma do Bermudão" (lit. Big Shorts' Gang).

=== Jeremiah ===
Jeremiah (Jeremias) is another of Franklin's best friends, and one of Mauricio's first Afro-Brazilian characters. He is seen most of the time hanging out with Franklin, Bucky (who is his best friend) and Manezinho. He often wears a red cap (which belonged to his grandfather), hiding that he is bald. Until the early 80s, he was drawn in a strong black color with blackface features, but since circa 1983, his color is a softer brown and has thin lips.

In 2018, the character became the protagonist of a graphic novel from the Graphic MSP collection, entitled Jeremias: Pele, addressing issues of racism. The graphic novel was written by Rafael Calça and drawn by Jefferson Costa, having had a sequel in 2020 entitled Jeremias: Alma.

=== Manezinho ===
Manezinho (Manoel Cunha Leite de Freitas) is another of Franklin and Bucky's best friends. He is a Portuguese immigrant who recently moved to Brazil. He wears red overalls and has hair similar to Monica's. He was frequently present in the comics until the early 70s, only returning in the 2000s with an excuse that in the meantime he was living in Portugal and returned to Brazil again. In the current comics it is revealed that he has a young brother called António Alfacinha.

=== Hummer ===
Hummer (Humberto, Humberto Silva da Veiga Pedro) is a boy suffers from muteness, which means all he can do to communicate is to murmur "hmm-hmm". In some strips, it is stated that he is also deaf, and that he reads people's lips to understand what they are saying. Originally he was introduced in 1960 as a pre-teen being one of Franklin's friends, but over time he was redesigned as a boy the same age as Jimmy Five. In some comics it is also implied he is deaf.

=== Mary Angela ===
Mary Angela (Maria Cebolinha, Maria de Melo Fagundes Rabello) is Jimmy Five's baby sister. She is a baby who is between 1 and 2 years old, sometimes being able to speak a few words. Just like Monica and Maggy she was also based on one of Mauricio de Sousa's first daughters, Mariângela, being the eldest daughter of the family.

=== Specs ===
Specs (Zé Luís) is one of the oldest kids of the gang. Specs likes reading and studying, but also finds time to hang with his friends. He was introduced as one of the Jimmy Five's best friends and sidekick during the return of the strips in the newspapers in 1963, at first without personality. After Monica's debut, he was designed to be her older brother, although those ties were discarded in later strips.

Specs was also originally the leader of the boys' club, but this idea was also forgotten giving his place to the Jimmy Five. Currently he has rarely appeared in modern comics, usually in favor of Franklin who is the main genius of the gang. His age is inconsistent, being portrayed as a pre-teen in earlier comics or as a teenager in most recent comics. In Monica Teen he along with Crystal first appeared working for Bubbly in his spaceship, occupying the rank of Ensign.

=== Couch Gag Louie ===
Couch Gag Louie (Teveluisão, Luiz Gustavo Vieira Lacerda) a portmanteau of the Portuguese words "Televisão" (Television), "Luís", and "Luisão" (Big Luís)) is a boy that as his name suggests, he is addicted to television, and spends all day watching it. He is one of the older boys being the same age as Specs (who is sometimes seen as his best friend). His friends always tells him that this is not healthy, and forces him to go outdoors. His main feature is that in addition to his glasses he is often seen with a grin even when he is speaking, being rarely seen without the grin. He is Bloggy's older brother. Like Specs he used to be a regular character between the 60's and 70's, but has few appearances in current comics.

=== Sunny ===
Sunny (Chaveco, William Duarte Chaves Filho) is Jimmy Five and Smudge's best friend. The main characteristic of this boy a lack of any defining features. He is always referred to as "the secondary character", and the main characters always make fun of his apparent uselessness. He constantly attempts to elevate his rank to that of a main character, a trait which he transfers to his teen version in the spinoff series Monica Teen.

Sunny originally appeared in the 1960s comic strips as one of several Jimmy Five's friends with whom he starred, and continued to appear in the comic books usually serving as a supporting character in most of the stories without showing any personality. Starting in the 2000s he began to have more prominence in stories written by Emerson Abreu, which helped to develop his current trait of "secondary character", as well as his family starting with his older sister Xabéu and his divorced parents. In recent stories he is seen spending time with his clumsy father whom he visits often as he lives with his mother and sister. Also in more recent stories he is seen having a paternal grandmother named Xepa and a yellow poodle named Ximbuca.

=== Angel ===
Angel (Anjinho, Ângelo Lino lit. Little Angel) he is an angel kid who is friends with the children of Lemon Tree Street and occasionally acts as their guardian angel. He often appears on a cloud and is often called upon by Monica and her friends to help them with a problem. Most of the time he acts as a responsible figure for the children in Lemon Tree, wanting to guide them on the right path and often trying to protect them from danger, which most of the time makes him suffer in comical situations. Sometimes the character is also seen rivaling some demon kids, besides having affiliations with Heaven and Saint Peter.

The character was originally introduced in a 1964 comic strip as a new friend for Jimmy Five, having been presented as an angel who was punished by the heavens being transformed into a normal boy for being very mischievous, but little by little he returned to his angel form, at one point even saying goodbye to Jimmy Five, but later returning as a regular character due to his popularity. Over the years, several divergences about the character have occurred among the writers, with some stories establishing that he is genderless, showing that he is capable of aging like the other characters, that only children can see him or even that he was born as an angel. However, in a story written by Flávio Teixeira de Jesus in 1991 it is shown that Angel was originally a boy who died on December 25th during the Roman Empire period, having fallen from a cliff while picking up a rose that he gave to God to be used to create the Star of Bethlehem.

Between the 70s and 90s, the character became popular enough to the point that he often appeared interacting with the quartet of protagonists Monica, Jimmy Five, Smudge and Maggy, sharing the spotlight with them in various media such as the film A Princesa e o Robô, the game Turma da Mônica em o Resgate (where is one of the playable characters), appearing in various products and even starring 3 issues in the Gibizinho series, however, the character's protagonism has reduced over time becoming rarely seen with the quartet in current stories. A graphic novel focused on Angel in the Graphic MSP series was published in May 2022 under the title "Anjinho: Além", having been made by Max Andrade and Kaji Pato. In Monica Adventures the character is shown as a teenage angel (having aged, contradicting the story published in 1991) initially presenting himself with a superhero name called Céuboy (lit. Skyboy), but later he adopts the name Ângelo, which is revealed to be his real name.

=== Annie ===
Annie (Aninha, lit. Little Ana) is Bucky's (main) girlfriend. She caught Bucky flirting with other girls multiple times, but in the end, she ends up forgiving him. Annie is very jealous, but Bucky still manages to date other girls while she is not watching over him. Later, on the series sequel, Monica Teen, Annie finally ends her relationship with Bucky, leaving him desperate to reconsiliate the relationship.

=== Dustine ===
Dustine (Maria Cascuda, Gabriele Silveira) is Smudge's girlfriend. Originally in the early stories Dustine was just as dirty girl, easily being a female counterpart of Smudge as her Portuguese name suggests, but over the years she has gradually changed her personality into a clean girl who takes frequent showers (even when she was drawn with smudges on her cheeks just like her boyfriend in older stories), what is occasionally portrayed as a running gag, as Smudge still prefers dirt. In the recent comics is a great friend to Monica and Maggy. She sometimes shows difficulties with her relationship with Smudge, both because Smudge doesn't take dating seriously and is often feel jealous to see her boyfriend with other girls, very similar to the relationship between Bucky and Annie. Her real name is Maria Clara, but she is usually referred to by the nickname Cascuda (Dustine in the English translations).

=== Toddy ===
Toddy (Quinzinho, Joaquim Prado de Oliveira Neto) lit. Little Quim (a short for Joaquim)) is Maggy's boyfriend being also the humble son of a baker. He is an overweight boy of Portuguese descent and often helps his father in his work, baking and delivering bread. He was originally introduced in the early issues of Maggy's comic book as a love interest for her, but over time became her boyfriend. Although he and Maggy show that they love each other very much, Maggy is usually shown to like him mostly due to his ability to satisfy her need for fresh baked goods.

=== Denise ===
Denise Rodrigues Lopes is a gossipy friend of Monica and Maggy, but sometimes acting as a rival to them when being with Cindy. Like Sunny, before she was a minor character but with an inconsistent design that often changes every story, until be revealed in a story that the character was played by several girls. Currently, she has appeared in stories with a fixed look having brown hair with pigtails and a purple dress. Originally in the first appearances during the 1990s she had no personality, and is often used as a support character for Monica and Maggy in stories focused only in the girls, or sometimes serving as an accomplice to Cindy practicing bullying against Monica. In recent stories after having her official look she has appeared more frequently in stories often being characterized by her outgoing, outspoken and self-centered yet charismatic personality, sometimes acting more mature than the other kid characters.

=== Junior ===
Junior (Dudu, Eduardo Meireles Bernardes Rosa da Cruz e Silva) is the younger cousin of Maggy. A 5-year-old boy who loves to tease the boys of the neighborhood, mainly Jimmy Five. He tends to be the opposite of Maggy, while his cousin is a glutton and has a voracious appetite Junior hates eating all kinds of food. He proves to be very intelligent for his age.

=== Nimbus ===
Mauro Takeda Hiromashi Fagundes is Nick Nope's brother and the magician of the gang. Like Marina and Nick Nope, he was also based on one of Mauricio's sons (Mauro Takeda e Sousa), Originally when was introduced in 1994, he was very interested in meteorology, being afraid of thunders and storms, having these characteristics based on the real Mauricio's son who was also interested in climatology in the childhood. He also appeared as Smudge's friend for sharing fear of rain clouds, but not water. However some years later Mauricio decided to change his characteristic later when the real Mauro Souza stopped to have interest by meteorology, at first becoming a boy beloved by the girls, but later as a magician in 1999.

=== Nick Nope ===
Nick Nope (Do Contra, Mauricio Hiromashi Fagundes Takeda Filho) is a boy that as his Portuguese name implies ("do contra" can be translated as "against", "contrary"), he likes to avoid the mainstream and do everything in reverse to the normal way. His running gag is liking for strange foods, like salty ice creams or rice with chunks of watermelon. He is Nimbus' brother. Like Marina, he is based on one of Mauricio's children (Mauricio Takeda e Souza).

=== Marina ===
Marina Sousa, first introduced in 1994, she was based on one of Mauricio's daughters, Marina Takeda e Sousa. Both Marinas love painting and drawing. Sometimes she has a giant magic pencil capable of giving life to any drawing she does, as well as redesign objects and sometimes characters, also possessing an eraser capable of erasing anything. Marina caught Franklin's eye, and became the subject of his unrequited affection (although she does date him in the spinoff series Monica Teen).

=== Cindy Frou-frou ===
Cindy Frou-frou (Carminha Frufru Carmem Frufru Andrade) is an arrogant rich girl and Monica's main rival. Among boys, she is considered the most popular girl in the neighborhood, and often the target of jealousy from other girls. She often hangs out with Denise to try to humiliate Monica and her friends. Similar to what happens to her also occurs to Fabio, the most popular boy among the girls.

=== Tony from Down the Street ===
Tony from Down the Street (Tonhão da Rua de Baixo) is a obese and big bully who often bullies the boys from the Lemon Street. Picky, grumpy and often thick stands behind the boys, but always loses a fight to Monica. He lives on a street below the Lemon Street, and has a counterpart of the same name who lives up the street. He is often seen wearing a yellow whoopee cap (very similar to a crown) and is bald. He also appears in the spin-off Monica Teen as one of the antagonists, rival of Jimmy Five, having a gigantic change in his look, becoming thin and having long blonde hair.

=== Crystal ===
Crystal (Xabéu Lorota, Xarlene Xaviera Lorota Diniz Filha) - Sunny's teenage older sister, portrayed as an active and jolly teen girl. Being the oldest and attractive girl in the Lemon Street, she is often passion target of every boy, mainly Jimmy Five and Smudge. Usually is seen working as a nanny in the neighborhood, mainly for Junior.

=== Bloggy ===
Bloggy (Bloguinho, lit. Little Blog) is a computer-obsessed young boy. His speech balloons are written with internet slangs and emoticons. Lately, he also began to express himself through meme faces. He was introduced as Teveluisão's little brother, who is a television-loving adolescent (see below). In addition, his hair is a simple "@".

=== Doreen ===
Doreen (Dorinha, lit. Alice Azevedo Ananias de Oliveira Little Dora) introduced in 2004, she is a blind girl inspired by blind philanthropist Dorina Nowill. As she is blind since birth, she doesn't know the shape of things, so she often just imagines. Her remaining senses are very precise, though.

=== Luca ===
Luca is a paralytic boy, who is one of the boys who is the target of Monica's affections. He was introduced in 2004 along with Doreen. He is very active, though. He plays basketball, and performs tricks on his chair, just like a skateboarder. His chair is also equipped with several gadgets set by Franklin. The girls find him a very cute boy, especially Monica. In the first appearances he was nicknamed as "Da Roda" (of the wheel, due to his wheel chair), however over time the nickname was forgotten.

Mr. Vald

Mr. Vald (Seu Valdomiro, Valdomiro Alberto Corrêa da Silva Santos)

=== Milena ===
Milena Tito de Souza Santos is another of Monica and Maggy's friends. An Afro-Brazilian girl who was created in 2017 for marketing reasons, however she was later introduced in the comics two years later. She's a daughter of a veterinary mother and an advertiser father, Milena is the middle child of her family. Milena also loves animals and plays the piano. In the spin-off Monica Teen, by Season III, she joins the main cast. The character has had a mixed reception from the public, mostly due to the fact that MSP constantly gives too much focus to the character, specially on advertisements and products, which makes her look like she's one of the main cast. The fact that she was getting more spotlight than every other support character was one of the reasons why most of the public accused the character of being some kind of Mary Sue and criticized her lack of personality. She is considered the first female Afro-Brazilian main character made by MSP.

== Parents and Adults ==
=== Mr. Sousa (Luiz Augusto Costa dos Santos) and Ms. Luisa (Luísa Moreira de Sousa Pessoa dos Santos) ===
Monica's parents. Mr. Sousa is based on Mauricio de Sousa himself, although he is a separate character from him.

=== Mr. Five and Ms. Five ===
Known as Seu João and Dona Maria (lit. Mr. Juan and Ms. Mary) João Augusto Rabello da Rocha and Maria Júlia do Nascimento Fagundes ) in the original, they are Jimmy Five and Mary Angela's parents. Mr. Five shares strong similarities with his son having the same five-strand hair, like his son he is clumsy and has no good luck and works in an office. Ms. Five (which real name is Maria) is a fat woman and works as a housewife.

=== Mr. Antônio and Ms. Lulu ===
Smudge's parents. Their full names are Antônio Costa Silva and Maria de Lourdes Pereira da Silva. Similar to Mr. Five, Antenor is also a clumsy father and shares strong similarities with his son having the same hair and also works in an office. Lurdinha is known for being a housewife often seen cleaning the house and arguing with her son about the messes he makes and for often disobeying her about her obsession with dirt and not wanting to shower. Originally when they were introduced they were dirty like their son, however over time they were characterized as being clean.

=== Mr. Carlito and Ms. Lina ===
Maggy's parents. Their full names are Carlos Augusto (for a few moments he is also referred to as Mr. Augustinho) and Eliana Bonfim (sometimes being nicknamed as Ms. Lili). Carlito often works in an office to support his family, especially his daughter's immense hunger. He sometimes acts as an antagonist to Vanilla wanting to kick him out due to his allergy to cats. He is also the brother of Ms. Cecília, which makes him Junior's uncle. Ms. Lina is Maggy's mom shares some facial similarities with her daughter, usually is seen cooking and is the niece of Aunt Nena.

Ms. Lina had her look inspired by Marilene Sousa, Mauricio de Sousa's first wife and also mother of Mônica, Magali, Mariângela and Mauricio Spada.

=== Mr. Durval and Ms. Cecília (Cecília Meireles da Cruz e Silva) ===
Junior's parents. They are often seen having to put up with their son's picky eater behavior. Cecília is Carlito's sister, which makes her Maggy's aunt.

=== Mr. Xavier and Ms. Xarlene ===
Xaveco and Xabéu's parents who are divorced. Similar to Xabéu, they were initially introduced as unnamed characters in the stories written by Emerson Abreu, but over time they gained more prominence. Xaveco and Xabéu live with Xarlene, in a large house with a swimming pool, but Xaveco is often seen visiting his father to have moments between father and son. Similar to Mr. Five and Mr. Antônio, Xavier is characterized both by having a clumsy father and also by sharing facial similarities with his son (notably his hair). Xavier is also Ms. Xepa's son. A characteristic involving the stories between Xaveco and Xavier is that they are mostly mute and Xaveco is often seen having accidents due to his father's clumsy way who often kisses him in every accident.

=== Mr. Everton and Doctor Mariana ===
Milena, Anderson, João Davi, Lívia and Ana Maria's parents. Doctor Marianna (sometimes known just as Ms. Mariana) is a veterinary and does volunteer work at animal shelters, and is very dedicated in raising her three children. Mr. Everton works as an advertiser, he is fun-loving, creative and has a geek side, having an interest in collecting action figures.

=== Nutty Ned ===
Nutty Ned (Louco, lit. Crazy (Man) Leonardo Otávio Umberto Café de Oliveira) is a completely unreasonable character. Apparently, lives in a hospice nearby to Jimmy Five's house. Often disturbs the boy with surreal adventures that lead him to madness.

=== Mr. Bill ===
Mr. Bill (Seu Juca Júlio Carlos Alberto Vieira da Costa Roberto) is a running gag, this character appears doing a different job every strip. He changes jobs so frequently because Monica and her friends always try to "help" him with his work. Bill's attempts to stop them invariably result in disaster, and Bill ends up losing his job

=== Aunt Nena ===
Aunt Nena - Maggy's baker aunt. She is known for being a great and famous chef, being expert in making numerous cakes and sweets that often end up being devoured by her niece. Sometimes she also helps Maggy with some advice. In some stories it is also revealed that she is a witch, having learned some spells through some books.

=== Uncle Pepo ===
Uncle Pepo - Maggy's toymaker uncle and Nena's husband. He used to appear frequently in the first issues of the Maggy comics in the 90s, but rarely appears in current comics.

== Animals (Pets) ==
=== Blu ===
Blu (Bidu) is Franklin's pet dog. He was originally the first main character of the franchise, along with his owner Franklin. In the Monica's Gang stories he usually appears as a normal dog who does not speak. However, he is usually seen talking and acting like a human being in their own stories, where he works as a cartoon actor, along with Glu and Manfred. He has the ability to talk to inanimate objects like a stone.

=== Fluffy ===
Fluffy (Floquinho, lit. Little Flake, Floco Rabello Fagundes) is Jimmy Five's pet dog, a green and extremely hairy dog of unknown race. Appears since the first newspaper strips. His weird look and hairy body usually are used as joke in most of the stories in which he appears, usually about its head being identical to its tail, if Fluffy is really a dog or even the fact that Fluffy can hide objects and people inside its fur. In 1995 Fluffy was considered a Lhasa Apso after Mauricio de Sousa received a letter from a reader comparing Fluffy with this breed, however in 2016 Fluffy's breed was changed to Puli. In the live-action film Turma da Mônica: Laços Fluffy's breed is a Lhasa Apso.

=== Vanilla ===
Vanilla (Mingau, lit. Porridge) is Maggy's pet cat. He was introduced in the very first Maggy comic book, at first being presented as a nameless stray cat adopted by Maggy, but in 1989 had a contest to choose its name.

=== Chauvy ===
Chauvy (Chovinista, Chovinista Pereira e Silva) is Smudge's pet pig. He's a clean, friendly and polite pig, is often treated as a dog by its owner and sometimes shows human traits to appear to watch television and take a bath sometimes, although unlike Blu and Vanilla he does not speak in his own stories. Originally he debuted timidly in the comics without personality or name and being portrayed dirty and hydrophobic like its owner, but over time his personality was changing, especially after the appearance of Smudge's own comic book in the 80s, although sometimes there are still some recent stories in which he appears dirty.

=== Ditto ===
Ditto (Monicão) is Monica's pet dog, as his owner it has big teeth and same hair, is a very energetic dog, that likes to bite (and sometimes destroy) everything he sees in front; he's Monica's second dog (first was napoleon(napoleão)).

=== Radar ===
Radar is Doreen's guide dog, Radar is a Labrador. She obtained him in a small tournament after unsuccessfully trying to buy him in a pet store of Jequitibás, the city in which she lived before she moved to Bairro do Limoreiro.

=== Rufus ===
Rufus (Rúfius) is an aggressive and furious dog that often scares the neighborhood children. He is known by the title "The angriest dog of the street". His owner is unknown, although it is believed that he belongs to Tony.

=== Caramela ===
Caramela is a lame chinchilla who was temporarily the pet of Jimmy Five and Sunny. She had her first appearance in 2004 in a story written by Emerson Abreu where she was presented as one of the participation prizes for Jimmy Five's family in the game show "Barraco Entre Famílias" after they lost to Sunny's family. She had the main focus in a story published the following year where Jimmy Five agreed to give her to Sunny who renamed her Caramela (previously named Eduarda by Jimmy Five), but she ends up dying at the end of the story and has since been referenced in some later stories.

The character made a return in 2023 where she was revived with the help of Xanim and playing a villainous role by kidnapping Jimmy Five and Sunny, in addition to leading other forgotten pets of the protagonists such as Napoleão, Onofre, Lalá and Lúcio, but she was defeated by Blu and the other pets and returned to the cemetery with Xanim, becoming a ghost again and being adopted by Quixupinha.

=== Other animals ===
- Duke (Duque) - Blu's best friend. He is another dog that often appears as a supporting character to Bidu in the stories he appears in and doesn't have much of a personality. The character has been present since the 1968 newspaper strips.
- The Six Cats - As it is known Vanilla's family, they are a total of five siblings (Vanilla is the sixth cat) each with his own characteristic. Matias is an adventurous cat who belongs to Manezinho's family and often travels on the family boat as a boarding cat, Tita is a female farm cat which belongs to Rosie Lee's friend Ritinha and is used to hunting mice, Nestor is a stray cat who lives in an alley with other cats and tends to be the most playful, Lili is a rich female cat who enjoys luxury and beauty and belongs to Cindy Frou-frou's family, and Percival is a black cat which belongs to Witch Xanda and has knowledge about magic.
- Ximbuca - Sunny's psychotic pet poodle, created by Emerson de Abreu in 2011. He was a gift from Dona Xepa to her grandson. He is characterized by being an ugly yellow poodle who behaves in a wacky way similar to Ditto.
- Napoleão - Monica's former pet dog, before Ditto. Just like his owner, he is characterized by having super strength. He originally appeared only in a 1974 story and was forgotten after his first appearance, but he reappeared in 2023 as one of Caramela's henchmen.
- Onofre - Jimmy Five's former pet alligator. He was the main focus of a story published in 1976 where he was initially a baby alligator who accidentally fell out of the zoo car and hid under Jimmy Five's bed, making the boy believe he was a lizard and adopting him as his pet and continuing to see him as a lizard even after he grew up. He was captured and taken away at the end of the same introductory story (which is also known for having received an animated adaptation in 1987), but he reappeared in 2023 as one of Caramela's henchmen.
- Laurinha - Maggy's former pet lobster. Originally only appeared in a 1996 story, but she reappeared in 2023 as one of Caramela's henchmen.
- Lúcio - Smudge's former pet crab. Originally only appeared in a 2001 story, but he reappeared in 2023 as one of Caramela's henchmen.
- Aveia (lit. Oat)- Toddy's pet cat that is also Vanilla's girlfriend.
- Leleala - They are a strange squad of three troublemakers angels pigs. Usually appears to try to protect the animals, especially pigs, but they live to cause chaos and problems where fly.
- The Flies - In some stories some flies are seen flying over Smudge, attracted by his stench. Smudge considers flies as his friends sometimes giving names to them. These flies are often a recurring joke in stories.
- Mostarda (lit. Mustard) - She is Milena's pet cat. Maurício de Sousa made a poll on Twitter to choice her name. The other two options for Mostarda's name were Estrela (lit, Star) and Diva.

== Villains ==
=== Captain Fray ===
Captain Fray (Capitão Feio, lit. "Captain Ugly") is the most recurring villain to appear in comics. A supervillain with the ability to fly and produce dirt rays from his hands who constantly creates plans whether to take over the world or just spread pollution. He lives in a base in the sewers of Lemon Tree district and is often allied with a group of mud creatures known as the Sewer Creatures who often aid him in his plans. In the older stories in which he appeared, he was often portrayed as a rival to the protagonists, especially Monica, but over time his appearances were reduced to just antagonizing Smudge, with him as his greatest rival, although he sometimes sees him as his potential pupil because they both have interests in dirt. He was originally introduced in a Jimmy Five magazine as Smudge's uncle (being Antenor's brother) who became this villain after suffocating himself with dust from old magazines he had stored away, however this origin as well as his relationship with Smudge ended up being forgotten over time, however his status as Smudge's uncle ended up being rescued during the Panini Comics magazines.

In other media, Captain Fray was the protagonist of a graphic novel entitled Capitão Feio: Identidade (lit. "Captain Fray: Identity"), which was published in 2017 by Magno Costa and Marcelo Costa as part of the Graphic MSP series. The graphic novel had a sequel in 2019 called Capitão Feio: Tormenta. Fray also makes an appearance in the game Turma da Mônica em: O Resgate replacing the final boss of Wonder Boy III: The Dragon's Trap, although he appears on the title screen and is mentioned as the main villain in the manual Mônica no Castelo do Dragão. In Monica Adventures he was initially introduced in the introductory saga as a different villain called Poeira Negra (lit. "Black Dust") being a servant of the villain Yuka. Unlike his original self, as Poeira Negra he was portrayed as a clean man with long, straight hair and wearing a suit. However, after Yuka's defeat, he later returns after a long time back to his original alter ego as Captain Fray.

- Sewer creatures - Captain Fray's minions. They are a group of creatures composed of mud and dirt that live with him in the sewers and often accompany him in his plans against Monica and her friends. However, to Fray's disappointment, they are shown to be very dumb and incompetent.

=== Lorde Coelhão ===
Lorde Coelhão (lit. Lord Big Rabbit) a tyrant alien rabbit who is known to have been one of Monica and her friends' greatest enemies. He is a short blue rabbit (having the size of a real rabbit, as opposed to the others of his species) from the carrot-shaped planet Cenourando (a joke with the Portuguese word for carrot, "cenoura"), being a space dictator who drives a large spaceship and commands an army of robotic rabbits known as Coelhóides, as well as being accompanied by his assistant Zoiudo. The character was created as a satire of Darth Vader from the Star Wars series, having as his main weapons a sword similar to a carrot (referencing a lightsaber) and a laser gun capable of trapping people inside gift boxes, despite this, he is shown to be one of the most clumsy and harmless villains to Monica and her friends.

His first appearance was in the last segment of the 1982 film As Aventuras da Turma da Mônica, where he appears as the main villain planning to dominate the Earth, but having his plans ruined by Monica and Jimmy Five. He had a bigger role in the sequel A Princesa e o Robô being the main villain who aims to dominate the planet Cenourando trying to force Princess Mimi to marry him and stop Monica and her friends from helping Robôzinho. After this film, Coelhão only returned in 2001 (probably during the hype of the Star Wars prequel trilogy) in a story published in the Parque da Mônica comic book where he kidnaps Mônica and her friends and tries to take over Mônica's park, but ends up being defeated and arrested by Prince Coelino (former Robôzinho). He returns to try to dominate the park again in a story published the following year (celebrating the park's 10th anniversary) where he travels back in time to dominate the park in 1992 during its opening. After these stories he had rare appearances, usually appearing alongside other villains.

In Monica Adventures he makes a quick appearance in the introductory saga as one of several villains from the past who return to face the protagonists. After that, another villain called Lorde Kamen begins to appear, replacing his role in the series, being a muscular kaiju rabbit and a dictator with an armor, but unlike Coelhão, Kamen is shown to not be evil.

- Coelhóides - An army of robotic rabbits that act as Lorde Coelhão's minions, serving as counterparts to the Stormtroopers. They have the ability to turn into floating balls. In their first appearance in As Aventuras da Turma da Mônica they had a similar appearance to Robôzinho, but since A Princesa e o Robô they have had more threatening appearances as a way of differentiating themselves from Robôzinho. Their names are a portmanteau from the Portuguese words "Coelho" (rabbit) and "Androide" (Android).
- Zoiudo - Lorde Coelhão's main assistant. A small, green, flying insect-like alien with huge eyes who acts as a spy for his boss and is often the target of his arrogant behavior. He was introduced in A Princesa e o Robô, and has since appeared as his main accomplice. His name is a Brazilian slang for "big-eyed".

=== Dr. Spam ===
Doctor Spam is a mad scientist with powers related to computers and technology who was introduced in 2005. The character is actually the evil alter ego of computer technician Professor Spada (who in turn is based on Mauricio's real-life son named Mauricio Spada e Sousa also being the only one of his children to be adapted as an adult in the comics) being a kind and friendly man who likes to help others. However, every time he accidentally comes into contact with a short circuit from a computer, he transforms into the supervillain Dr. Spam, who has the ability to physically dissolve into digital data to invade electronic systems and navigate the internet like a virus and using it as an advantage to break into houses teleporting through computers and capture people, however, he is often defeated by Monica and her friends. His double personality disturb between alternating between Dr. Spam and Professor Spada was inspired by Robert Louis Stevenson's Strange Case of Dr. Jekyll and Mr. Hyde. Mauricio de Sousa's real-life son, who inspired the character died on 2 May 2016 of heart attack at the age of 44.

In his first appearance, Professor Spada transformed into Dr. Spam for the first time after being accidentally hit by Monica's bunny, causing him to be thrown into the computer while he was fixing it, however, he was defeated by Bloggy through an anti-spam program that made him return to normal. Since then the character has been seen as a recurring villain antagonizing the characters, however, even though he is considered a villain for all the children of Lemon Tree Street without distinction, over the time he was seen focusing his villainies more against Smudge as he frequently appeared allying himself with his other enemies such as Captain Fray, Dr. McClean, Cumulus and the twins Cremilda and Clotilde in the early issues published by Panini Comics.

In Monica Adventures the character had a small appearance in the first saga as one of the old villains to be faced by the protagonists through the Magical Dimensions, being presented with the alter ego Megaspam and being inside the technological dimension Tobor. However, like Captain Fray, he returned to appear in many later issues in his original alter ego.

=== Dr. McClean ===
Dr. McClean (Dr. Olimpo in the original) is of the main villains for Smudge, being practically an opposite of Captain Fray. He follows the stereotype of a mad scientist whose main characteristic is being a neurotic about cleanliness and having a great repulsion for dirt. He sees Smudge as his greatest archenemy and frequently creates plans to try to capture Smudge and clean him up. When he is not trying to attack Smudge he is seen allying himself with other villains. Notably, he also has a rivalry with Captain Fray due to their opposing interests, although they occasionally appear together in groups of villains against Monica or just Smudge due to having a common enemy. He is often assisted by his henchman Sapóleo and occasionally has closeness with the twins Cremilda and Clotilde for sharing the same interests in cleanliness and rivalry with Smudge.

- Sapóleo - Dr. Olimpo's henchman. He is a short, overweight man who often accompanies Dr. McClean in his plans and follows the stereotype of a clumsy villain henchman who is often responsible for ruining his boss's plans. In his first appearances he was referred to by different names such as José or James.

=== Cremilda and Clotilde ===
Cremilda and Clotilde are a pair of fat twin sisters, who like Dr. McClean are neurotic about cleanliness and are often seen cleaning everything in sight. Just like McClean, they often appear as antagonists to Smudge, often also creating plans to give him a bath as they are also repulsed by his dirt habits, although they are also incompetent at doing so. A recurring theme in the stories focused on them is that Smudge never notices their malicious attitudes in wanting to chase him by trying to throw water on him and because of this he does not show any negative feelings towards them, always seeing them as his friends, although in more recent stories Smudge has become aware of their real intentions. Unlike other villains they are not necessarily evil, despite in the recent stories they are often seen allying with other major villains such as McClean and even Captain Fray in villain groups it was once mentioned that they did this in search of boyfriends. They have twin nieces called Lara and Luiza who just like them are also neurotic about cleanliness.

=== Cumulus ===
Cumulus is a supervillain, a man with a body made of clouds who proclaims himself Smudge's archenemy and, like Dr. McClean and Cremilda and Clotilde, he is also obsessed with chasing Smudge to give him a bath. He was originally introduced in 2010 as a villain who was once a television presenter who lost his job after Smudge accidentally soiled him and decided to swear revenge on the boy by transforming himself into a cloud-man through chemical experiments, however, even though he has presented himself as a super-powered villain capable of controlling the weather and causing storms, he has shown himself to be incompetent against Smudge since his first appearance. Consequently, over time, the character began to be seen interacting with Smudge's other villains, either showing rivalry with Captain Fray or even joining him and other villains like McClean and the twins in groups of villains.

=== Viviane ===
Viviane is a young and beautiful goth witch who lives in the Lemon Street. She has her powers derived from the moon and often creates plans that involve summoning the moon power to rule the world being accompanied by her talking cat Boris who acts as her accomplice. She is known to be an enemy of the neighborhood kids, though in most of her appearances she is often paired with Maggy serving as her archenemy who is usually the one who thwarts her plans. Viviane was introduced in 1998 as a creation by Emerson de Abreu and her design was inspired by artist Viviane Yamabuchi, at first, she was portrayed as a mysterious and eccentric villain, but in her later appearances she began to appear as a more comical enemy.

In Monica Adventures she has a daughter named Ramona.

- Bóris Henrique Gatolé - Viviane's talking pet black cat who often helps Viviane in her plans. Like his owner, he was introduced as a more serious antagonist, but began to be portrayed in a more comical way in his later appearances.

=== The Tombanians ===
They are a clumsy and mysterious alien race from a planet known as Tomba. They are characterized by always wearing a spacesuit hiding their real faces and are able to transform to take on the appearance of other people. At first they were introduced in a story focused on Smudge where he at first mistakes them for his friends believing they were playing aliens, until later discovering that they were actually real alien invaders. At the end of the same story it is revealed that the Tombanians took the form of Smudge and accidentally left one of their allies (who with amnesia came to believe to be the real Smudge) while taking the real Smudge. After this story they had a few other appearances, including meeting with Bubbly in the space (while in their Smudge form) and later in Monica Teen where they are shown bigger and older.

=== Capitão Picolé ===
Capitão Picolé (literally: Captain Popsicle) - A recurring villain who appeared in a miniseries that parodied the American series Lost. He was the first character created by Mauricio de Sousa, during his childhood, however, he was forgotten and decided to get revenge against the other characters by kidnapping and imprisoning them on an island (including characters who have been forgotten in the first strips, like Nico Demon and Zé Munheca). He was defeated by Monica but managed to scape. In Monica Nº54 - 600 edições, it's revealed that he's the real person behind Cabeça de balde (lit: bucket head), whose real identity was ambiguous until this edition.

=== Cabeleira Negra ===
Cabeleira Negra - A young and beautiful female space pirate who was one of the villains in the film Uma Aventura no Tempo. She is captain of a squad of space pirates known for various crimes in space, besides being a descendant of Blackbeard. In the film was the Bubbly's rival and also love interest. It is revealed in the film she is also bald and wears a wig. Her last appearance was in one of the first editions of Monica Teen.

=== Penha, Agnes and Sofia ===
A trio of mean girls who are known for living in the neighboring neighborhood, the Bairro das Pitangueiras, and are often referred as the Pitangueiras' Girls. They are portrayed as enemies of the children of Limoeiro, mainly Monica, Maggy and Denise who are considered their biggest rivals. The characters were created by Emerson Abreu and introduced in 2007.

Penha is the leader, being a rich and spoiled girl, with attitudes very similar to Cindy's, notably already dating Jimmy Five once causing Monica to be jealous. It is revealed over the course of the issues that her father is a corrupt politician and her mother is a vampire who hides in the depths of her mansion. Her design is very similar to Little Lulu, which was even considered the main rival for Monica in the sale of comics in Brazil until the 90s.

Agnes is a paranoid, cold and unsympathetic girl who has no friends (except for Penha and Sofia) and has a habit of kidnapping animals (such as birds) to keep them in cages. She lives in an old mansion together with the ghosts of her deceased parents, who influenced her daughter's antisocial behavior. In Monica Teen it is revealed that she died and became a ghost.

Sofia is a huge and grumpy obese girl with immense strength (very similar to Little Lotta), being even resistant enough to Monica's coelhadas. Because of her large size, her extraordinary strength and being always grumpy, she is usually feared by the other characters (except her friends Penha and Agnes). In Monica Teen she returns, but redeeming herself by claiming that she was misunderstood in childhood and never wanted to be the enemy in the first place.

=== Cabeça de Balde ===
Cabeça de Balde (lit. Bucket Head) is a mysterious villain created by Paulo Back originally introduced in 2016. The character is an entity that normally takes possession of a character every time they have an accident, tripping and falling head first into a bucket on the floor and wearing a cloth cloak and carrying a broom serving as a scepter. Every time a character becomes him, they become unconscious, causing Cabeça de Balde to take possession of their bodies until the bucket is removed from their heads, making people return to who they were. His villainous goals often vary from the people he possesses, ranging from revenge, seeking fame or assuming power over others.

=== Other Villains ===
- Capitão Chiclete - A supervillain who was originally an employee of a gum factory who accidentally fell into a vat of candy and ended up transforming into a villain capable of flying and shooting bursts of gum capable of trapping people. Despite being a villain, his design is very similar to Superman. He had his first appearance in a 1976 story and since then has had a few rare appearances referenced with the other villains, and he is considered an enemy to Jimmy Five.
- Lax-Labax/Labareda - A supervillain who is an alien man with fire powers. He proclaims himself to be Jimmy Five's archenemy for mistaking him for his great-great-grandfather Cebolinhax who was responsible for having trapped him in the underground 300 years ago, preventing him from dominating the Earth, swearing revenge against him ever since. His biggest weakness is water. He had his first appearance in a 1977 story and since then has had a few rare appearances referenced with the other villains.
- João Transformão - A supervillain who was originally an amusement park mechanic who hated children and ended up acquiring powers to turn people into toys with a magic wrench. He had his first appearance in a 1985 story and since then has had a few rare appearances referenced with the other villains, and is also considered one of Jimmy Five's enemies. In some stories he's referred as "The King of the Toys".
- Witch Xanda - A recurring antagonist who appears in some stories. She is a witch who, unlike Viviane, looks like a traditional witch: fat, ugly, with messy hair and a hat. She lives in the neighborhood and is characterized by being bad-tempered and often losing her temper when any of the children interrupt her during her spells, usually punishing them by casting a spell. She is also notably the owner of the cat Percival who is Vanilla's brother. She has few appearances in the comics, sometimes being paired with Maggy as an archenemy for her.
- Personagem Misterioso (lit. Mysterious Character) - A villain with a hidden face who was originally an old comic book hero who had his series canceled in issue 99 and out of envy decided to try to make the number 100 cease to exist so that other characters would not be able to reach the 100th issue of their series. He played the villain to Jimmy Five in the opening story of his 100th issue published by Editora Globo in 1995, however, the character was redeemed in the end when he was hired to become the protagonist of a new comic book, but using his villain identity, making his real identity remain mysterious. The character returned again as a villain for Jimmy Five in 2014, antagonizing him and Captain Fray, wanting to prevent Jimmy Five from having his 500th issue, showing envy, as his title was canceled again before completing that number.
- Ladrão de Fumacinhas (lit. Little Smoke Thief) - A supervillain who aims to dominate the world with a machine capable of absorbing every "little smoke" that represents the characters' feelings of anger in the comics and launching them with more power at people, making them become more aggressive to the point of attacking each other. He had his first appearance in a 2000 story and since then has had a few rare appearances referenced with the other villains.
- S.U.J.O.C.A. - A villainous organization composed of Smudge's main villains who appeared in 3 stories published in the 2010s and originally created by Paulo Back. The group consists of Captain Fray (being the leader), the Sewer Creatures, Dr. McClean, Sapóleo, Cremilda, Clotilde, Cumulus and Dr. Spam who frequently hatch plans against Smudge, probably in reference to the Sinister Six. The name is an acronym for Sociedade Unida da Junta Opositora do Cascão e Amiguinhos (lit. United Society of the Opposition Board of Smudge and Friends), but the name S.U.J.O.C.A. is also a pun with dirty in Portuguese. The group disbanded after they met Cabeça de Balde causing members to conflict over their different goals.
- Soninha - Denise's evil imaginary sister. Originally debuted as a recurring character in a 90s story in a time when Denise still had an inconsistent personality and design. Later after many years absent and forgotten the character returned to appear in a story as a villain conspiring to overthrow Denise, revealing her past as an imaginary sister that Denise created and who became real after a birthday wish. She has the ability to manipulate people by usually convincing them to be her friends through compliments, countering Denise's arrogant and rude personality, and also create illusions.
- The Seperpant - an evil alien sealed away and seeks to free herself with a cult. She is the Main antagonist of the Monica Adventures series.
- Lepus - An Evil rabbit sorcerer that Lady Monicoel and Hercoelho fought and sealed away.

== Recurring, Extint and 3rd characters ==
- Mingão - An adult character of Portuguese origin who was Jimmy Five's friend in the first comic strips. His main personality was that of being forgetful and he had few appearances. Among the characters, he had the most simplistic design. He was forgotten over time currently being referenced as one of Mauricio de Sousa's forgotten characters in modern comics.
- Garotão (literally Big Boy) - An unseen giant child, that is one of the old Jimmy Five's friends. He has a very formidable height for his age. Due to his size he is often seen with giant toys and doing absurd things like crossing the Mediterranean Sea or causing earthquakes by jumping. Because of the size he never physically appeared in the comics, often making the characters believe he was an imaginary friend of Jimmy Five. He appeared only in the first few strips, but also made some recent special guest appearances in comic books, usually having his feet visibly appearing.
- Bernardão - A sad boy, a friend of Jimmy Five. Always dressed in black clothes and seen with his eyes closed he is known for often makes bad luck for people who approach of him, mostly Jimmy Five, though he always gets away from bad luck. By always jinxing his friends, he is a very lonely boy. In modern comics he has rare appearances, usually being referenced as one of Mauricio de Sousa's forgotten characters alongside characters like Nico Demo or Niquinho.
- Leonardo - An artistic boy, named after Leonardo da Vinci. Like Marina he has an incredible talent with paintings and sculptures. He is a friend of Jimmy Five and has a passion for Maggy. He appeared only in the first newspaper strips of the 60s, but just like Mingão, Bernardão and Garotão he is occasionally referenced in modern comics as one of Mauricio de Sousa's forgotten characters.
- Zé Cruzadinha - A friend of Jimmy Five who only appeared in the first newspaper strips. He is a crazy kid whose main characteristic was being obsessed with crossword puzzles.
- Massaro - A Japanese immigrant boy who first appeared in a 1972 comic book as a new friend of Jimmy Five. He is a boy who is very faithful to Japanese traditions to the point of wearing a kimono and getas all the time. He also cannot speak Portuguese properly, having a strong Japanese accent. The character has rare appearances, even being forgotten until 2008, when he reintroduced himself as Tikara's cousin.
- Estrelinha Mágica (literally Magic Little Star) - A magical star who became friends with Monica after losing its forces and falling in her room at night of Christmas. She was the protagonist of the 1988's movie "Monica's Gang The Magic Star". With the success of the film in the year the character appeared in some comics and sold a toy manufactured by Tectoy. The character however has been forgotten over time.
- Robôzinho (literally Little Robot) - A coelhóide with emotions that was the main character in the 1983 animated film A Princesa e o Robô. He gained consciousness after being struck by lightning from the Pulsar star and had a strong love for Princess Mimi and became rival with Lorde Coelhão, fighting for the Mimi's love. He went on a journey with the help of Monica and her friends in search of a heart so he could become a real rabbit and marry Mimi. After the film, he returned in 2001 in a story from Parque da Mônica where he appears under the name of Prince Coelino, being the leader of the Cenoural Patrol leading other coelhóides that are similar to his original appearance and helping Monica and her friends to stop Coelhão. A counterpart of him appears in Monica Adventures being called simply as Robô (Robot), having a human-like body and proving to be much more powerful, possessing super strength and the ability to project giant holographic swords from his hands and just like in the original he also has his love interest for Mimi.
- Princess Mimi - The princess from the Cenourando planet. A pink anthropomorphic alien rabbit and the love interest of Robozinho and Lord Big Rabbit. She appeared as a teenager in one of the sagas in Monica Teen.
- Mimi's Father - Is the king of the Cenourando planet. A chubby and old anthropomorphic alien rabbit. He reappears in one of Monica Teen's sagas, with a very different look.
- Monica's Boyfriends - In several comics Monica (and sometimes the other girls in the neighborhood) is seen falling in love with other boys, most notably having their names ending in "inho" (Portuguese suffix for diminutive male names). One of the most notable is Reinaldinho, inspired by former MSP writer Reinaldo Waisman, who used to appear frequently in the 80s and 90s. In current comics, Monica's main interest is Danilo (Danilinho). The other boys, particularly Jimmy Five, tend to dislike or envy these boys. Sometimes Jimmy Five takes advantage of Monica's strong love interest in these boys to create plans against her.
- Capitão Pitoco - A fictional parody superhero, very similar to Superman and Batman (although his design is similar to Space Ghost). He is the favorite superhero of all the boys from the neighborhood, mainly Jimmy and Smudge. The character debuted in the 2000s, since previously the heroes that were used in the comics were usually Marvel and DC Comics superheroes.
- Superomão - A parody of Superman. Often appears as either a fictional character (being Jimmy Five's favorite superhero) or a character that exists and interacts with the children of Limoeiro. A frequent running gag is that the character, as much powerful as he is, is unable to overcome Monica's strength, which is even capable of defeating him. His appearance varies, sometimes being drawn exactly identical to Superman. The real Superman officially appeared in a crossover between the Justice League and Monica's Gang in 2018.
- Ursinho Bilu - A fictional teddy bear and cartoon character in the comics. He is a cute bear very popular among the neighborhood kids. The character is a parody of bear characters like Winnie-the-Pooh and Care Bears.
- António Dinis de Sá - Manezinho's younger brother and friend of Jimmy Five. A Portuguese immigrant who often speaks with a Portuguese accent. He also is good friends with Monica having a crush on her. He made his comic book debut in 2007, but has had rare appearances since his debut. Sometimes he's just called Alfacinha (a term to denote a person from Lisbon) that means "little lettuce", because of this nickname Manezinho considers him a great friend for Jimmy Five, because according to him "vegetables get along well" (basing that Jimmy Five's original name is also a vegetable name).
- André - A 4-year-old autistic boy who is friends with Monica and Jimmy Five.
- Tainara - An optimistic girl with down syndrome who is classmate of Monica and her friends.
- Ivo and Vitória - They are a couple of seropositive children, classmates Monica and her friends.
- Valentina and Valéria - based on Mauricio's twin daughters, the first is described by herself as an "authentic and strong" person, while the latter, also according to herself, likes to cook.
- Tikara Suzuki (Brazilian way of saying "Chikara" (力), Japanese word that means power, strength) - This Japanese Brazilian character was created by Mauricio to be the mascot of the "Comemoração do Centenário da Imigração Japonesa no Brasil" (Celebration of the Centenary of the Japanese immigration to Brazil). He appeared in Monica's strips in May and June 2008. Since 2008 he has never returned in comics, although he is a regular character in Monica Teen.
- Keika Takeda - The female Japanese-Brazilian character in the comics. She entered in the comics with her friend Tikara, in May 2008's Monica comic as the commemorative mascot for the 100 year anniversary of Japanese immigration to Brazil. Like Tikara she has also never returned to comics since 2008, although she is also a regular character in Monica Teen. Her name is a reference to Alice Keiko Takeda, Mauricio de Sousa's wife.
- Anderson - Milena's younger brother. He is one of Junior's friends.
- João Davi - Milena's older brother.
- Lívia - Milena's older sister. She is Crystal's best friend.
- Ana Maria - Milena's younger sister. She is Crystal's best friend.
