= The Adventures of Monica and Friends =

1982 film by Mauricio de Sousa

As Aventuras da Turma da Mônica
- Theatrical release poster
- Directed by: Mauricio de Sousa
- Written by: Itsuo Nakashima; José Márcio Nicolosi
- Based on: Monica's Gang by Mauricio de Sousa
- Produced by: Mauricio de Sousa
- Starring: Mauricio de Sousa; Maria Amélia Manso Basile; Ivete Jayme; Isaura Gomes; Silvia Cordeiro Marinho; Orlando Viggiani Filho; Denise Simonetto; Araquem Saldanha
- Cinematography: José Reinaldo Barbirato; Renato Bassani; Pio Zamuner
- Edited by: Mauro Alice; Jair Correia
- Music by: Mauricio de Sousa; Gao Gurgel; Márcio de Sousa; Eduardo Leão Waisman; Remo Usai (instrumental)
- Production companies: Black & White & Color
- Distributed by: Embrafilme
- Release date: 23 December 1982 (Brazil)
- Running time: 75 minutes
- Country: Brazil
- Language: Portuguese

The Adventures of Monica and Friends (Portuguese: As Aventuras da Turma da Mônica) is a 1982 Brazilian animated anthology film directed by Mauricio de Sousa, based on his Monica's Gang comic books. This was the first feature film based on Monica's Gang and which began production of the cartoon series based on the comics.

The film mixes animation with some scenes made in live-action interpreted by Mauricio de Sousa in his studio. The film shows four individual stories that end up linking through the characters interacting with Mauricio through phone calls.

Distributed by Embrafilme, the film was released theatrically in São Paulo on 23 December 1982 and in Rio de Janeiro on 10 January 1983.

== Plot ==
The film begins with a live-action sequence focusing on Mauricio de Sousa working at his desk until he starts receiving phone calls from his characters—Monica, Jimmy Five, Smudge, Maggy, Franklin and Blu—who have just discovered that they were appearing in a film. While Sousa seeks inspiration to create the plot of the film, the film moves into the comics and focuses on the animated characters.

The first story named "O Plano Infalível" (lit translation: The Infallible Plan) follows Jimmy Five and Smudge as they devise several plans to pull a prank on Monica, but all the gadgets created by Jimmy Five eventually backfire against him in a style of humor similar to the Wile E. Coyote and the Road Runner cartoons.

The second story is named "Um Amor de Ratinho" (lit translation: A Mice's Love) and it centers on Monica, who attends a costume party at Franklin's house wearing a mouse costume, but is accidentally shrunk by one of Franklin's inventions and befriends a small mouse that falls in love with her.

The third story named "A Ermitã" (lit translation: The Female Hermit) also focuses on Monica. Feeling rejected by her friends (who are secretly organizing her birthday party), Monica decides to run away from home to live as a hermit in the mountains.

The fourth and last story named "O Império Empacota" (lit translation: The Pack Empire) is a parody of the Star Wars films, focused on Monica and Jimmy Five. A mysterious robot rabbit is sent to Earth to dominate the planet by orders of his master, Lorde Coelhão. The robot lands in Jimmy Five's bedroom and tries to attack him, but all of his attempts go wrong. The robot is not noticed by Jimmy Five until the two meet Monica and accidentally ends up abducting the two by stealing Monica's stuffed rabbit Samson. Monica ends up being imprisoned in a gift package while Jimmy Five meets Lorde Coelhão (lit translation: Lord Big Rabbit) and his plan to conquer Earth. Jimmy Five flees into a spaceship, saving Monica and using the spaceship he manages to defeat Lorde Coelhão and his robots.

At the end of the film, Monica and Jimmy Five, still inside the spaceship, land on Sousa's desk, joining Smudge, Maggy, Franklin, Blu and Angel. All the characters wonder about the film which Sousa intended to do, but he says he no longer needs to make the film because it is done, referring indirectly to the stories that the viewer has just watched.

== Cast ==
Mauricio de Sousa appears in live action playing himself. The following are the voice actors for the film's characters:

- Maria Amélia Costa Manso Basile — Mônica
- Ivete Jayme — Cebolinha
- Isaura Gomes — Cascão
- Silvia Cordeiro Marinho — Magali
- Orlando Viggiani Filho — Franjinha
- Denise Simonetto — Anjinho
- Araken Saldanha — Lord Coelhão
- Ronaldo Baptista (credited as Ronaldo Batista) — TV announcer
- Eduardo Leão Waismann — Ratinho and Coelhoide
- Aliomar Vasconcelos — Ratinha
- Eleu Salvador Selbach — Cats
- Fábio Cirello — Abelardo
- Odair Batista — Bidu
- Mauro Alice — Contestant

== Critical reception ==
As Aventuras da Turma da Mônica received mixed reviews. Carlos Fonseca of Última Hora felt the film had an amateurish feel despite its "reasonable drawing style" and animation similar to American productions, and he preferred Piconzé (1972), the third animated feature film produced in the country. He considered the episode "O Império Empacota" the best segment, because of its having a "start, middle and end", while he opined that other stories were "absolutely uninteresting" or lacked rhythm. Rubens Ewald Filho of A Tribuna instead wrote that "O Império Empacota" had a "cute, but unsatisfying" story, preferring the segment "Um Amor de Ratinho", and concluded that the film was "[n]othing exceptional, but it works quite well", though he criticized the ending, in which Mauricio interacts with the characters.

== Background ==
=== Origin and short film ===
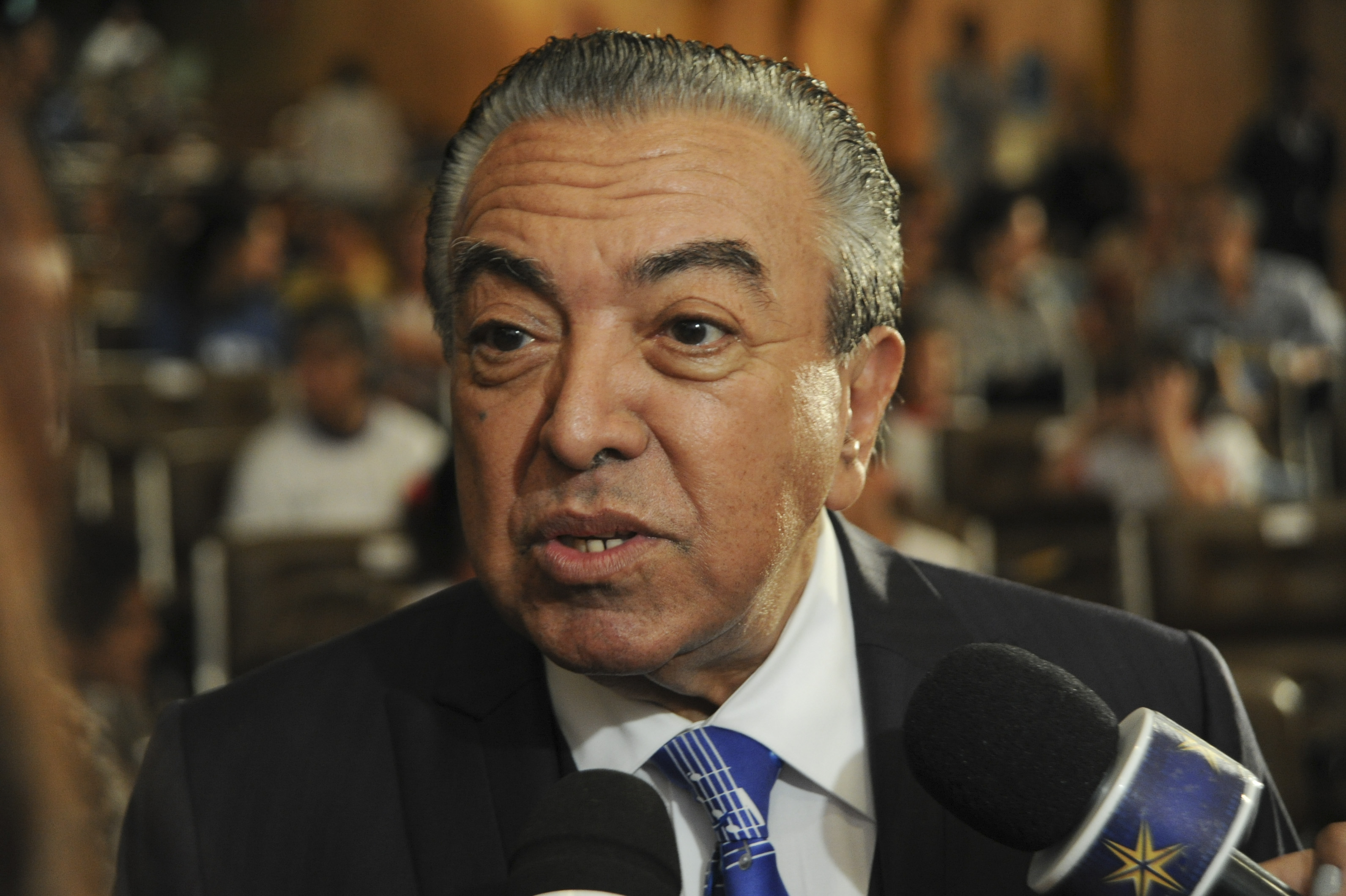
Mauricio de Sousa in 2014

Monica's Gang is a comic series created by Brazilian cartoonist and businessman Mauricio de Sousa. It originated in 1959, initially published as comic strips in Folha de S.Paulo, featuring Bidu and Franjinha as the main characters. From the 1960s onward, the series began to acquire the identity for which it became best known, with the creation of new characters such as Cebolinha, Cascão and Mônica. In 1970, the first issue of what would become Monica's Gang was released, titled Mônica e Sua Turma.

In 1976, already interested in making a film for some time, Mauricio conceived what would become the first film based on his work, initially envisioned as a Christmas special short film. Produced in just over two weeks, it aired in December that year on TV Globo after approval from Boni. According to Mauricio himself, it was "perhaps [...] the most memorable little film of Monica's Gang, considered unforgettable by those who watched it at the time". With the success of the production, he gradually developed the idea for the franchise's first feature-length film, "along the lines of Disney". However, Mauricio later commented: "Sometimes I got excited about the project, but soon afterward I put it aside, afraid of biting off more than I could chew. At the time, making films in Brazil was extremely complicated".

=== Acquisition of Black & White & Color ===
In the early 1980s, Mauricio had the opportunity to buy Black & White & Color, a small animation studio with six employees. Initially the company was purchased in partnership with Pelé, but Mauricio soon bought out Pelé's share and transferred the studio to his own headquarters in São Paulo, in a building financed by Octávio Frias de Oliveira. Black & White & Color had two purposes: to function as a laboratory where Mauricio could learn cinematic techniques, and to produce commercials—according to him, "many clients wanted to use the characters [from Monica's Gang] in TV advertisements. Now I would be able to serve them better".

During idle periods, when commercials were not being produced—Mauricio said that in "good times" they produced about ten per month—the team began making short animations of about five minutes, hoping that TV Globo would broadcast them similarly to the earlier Christmas special. However, one of Mauricio's favorites, A Sereia do Rio, was rejected by Boni. (Note: The short would later be shown in the film Mônica e a Sereia do Rio (1987).) As a result, the animations began to be screened in cinemas before family films. Mauricio said that this was useful to "test audience acceptance of Monica's Gang films on the big screen. And it was great". With this progress, in early 1982 he decided the time had come to produce a feature-length film.

I decided that, at the age of 46, it was time to become a film director. Even if the naysayers in the company complained, I was going to produce the first major Monica's Gang film.

== Production ==
=== Company restructuring ===
To begin production of the film, Mauricio hired more staff for Black & White & Color: "film people, more artists, more colorists, more inkers, more technicians". When "there were no more animators available to hire in Brazil", he looked in Argentina and Uruguay. At one point the company had more than one hundred employees, "the largest of its kind in Latin America", according to Mauricio. His eldest daughter, Mariangela, was among the new hires, "coloring meters and meters of cel animation sheets". (Note: In traditional cel animation, hand-drawn images were transferred to transparent sheets of acetate.) Due to the expansion, he had to request another floor for his studio from Octávio Frias, who agreed without charging extra.

Mauricio hired the boyfriend of his second daughter, Mônica, economics student Marcos Saraiva. He had previously worked at the Loja da Mônica store, then became Mauricio's personal assistant and later joined the commercial department supervising advertisements produced by Black & White & Color. Marcos then "began to interfere in the production line to organize and accelerate processes". Appreciating his work, Mauricio promoted him to executive manager of the studio.

=== Script and animation ===
"Creating the story was easy", according to Mauricio. The plot was written by him and Reinaldo Waisman, whom he considered one of his best screenwriters. The idea was for Mauricio himself to serve as the narrative thread connecting four stories, a structure previously used by Disney. However, he later cited many production difficulties in his autobiography.

Making an animated film was very laborious, but it was not an indecipherable enigma. In broad terms, the animation process had only a few steps, theoretically relatively simple. [...] In practice, however, the theory became an insane task. Few epics come close in terms of overcoming obstacles. If I made a list of things essential to the film that did not exist in Brazil, it would not have centimeters but meters.

Among the problems mentioned was the inferior quality of materials available domestically compared with imported supplies. The correct brush with fine and firm bristles was unavailable, and a special paint had to be purchased in California from the same manufacturer that supplied Disney and Hanna-Barbera. Because the large tubes of paint were expensive and difficult to import, the studio used them as pigments rather than as full paint, mixing imported colored paint with domestic white paint to extend their supply.

Another problem arose when Brazilian suppliers ran out of acetate sheets, forcing the studio to search unusual sources; at one point they purchased them from the Brazilian Army, which used them to manufacture detonator components. On another occasion, the studio had to import the material from England. Additionally, the rapid production pace overwhelmed the available animation camera equipment. Unable to rent one domestically, the team searched internationally and eventually purchased one from Japan.

Regarding special effects—particularly important for the final story inspired by Star Wars—Mauricio gave an example:

Marcos Saraiva invented models, contraptions and systems to obtain the effects we wanted. In one of them, for example, he created a cart that moved along a rail attached to the ceiling. At the tip of the cart was an invisible thread holding a model spaceship. Below, supported by another invisible rod, another contraption made another model move around the first. Science fiction in the 1980s was pure craftsmanship.

Mauricio later reported investing 100 million cruzeiros—about six million Brazilian reais in 2017 currency—into the production, although other sources claim the cost was 120 million. which the Jornal do Brasil described as the largest budget for any Brazilian film at the time. Production lasted nine months, which Mauricio described as "an absolute record in terms of speed". Approximately 120,000 drawings, 500 backgrounds, more than 100 paints and about 45,000 painted cels were used, with about 36 seconds of animation completed per day.

=== Meeting with Embrafilme ===
In 1982 the military government was nearing its end but still held considerable power. Much later I learned that an influential figure in Brasília was dissatisfied with Embrafilme's sponsorship choices. In his view, aside from the Trapalhões films, the agency mainly supported left-leaning or sexually oriented films while ignoring productions aimed at families. When he heard I was making an animated feature, he intervened so that Embrafilme would support As Aventuras da Turma da Mônica.

Midway through production, Mauricio received a phone call from a director of Embrafilme asking him to travel to Rio de Janeiro for a meeting. The state company, which financed and distributed most major Brazilian films, was interested in investing. Mauricio and Marcos Saraiva attended the meeting but later recalled being "very poorly received". After Mauricio suggested that Embrafilme fund 40% of the budget, an employee reluctantly stalled negotiations, which irritated Marcos. He responded that if they did not answer within 24 hours they would miss "the opportunity to support the first commercial color feature-length animation in the country's history". The same employee called the studio the next day asking them to sign the contract under Mauricio's terms. The agreement was signed in front of three directors of the state company.

=== Soundtrack ===
Remo Usai arranged, conducted and directed the soundtrack, with compositions by Mauricio, Gaó Gurgel and Vilma Camargo. Usai worked for three months with forty musicians from the Orquestra Sinfônica do Theatro Municipal do Rio de Janeiro. The soundtrack contains ten songs: themes for the characters Mônica, Cebolinha, Cascão, Magali and Bidu, as well as the film's main theme, all composed by Mauricio, Gaó and Vilma. There are also instrumental tracks such as "Rock da Rata Lee" and "Um Amor de Ratinho" (from the episode "Um Amor de Ratinho"), "O Império Empacota" and "Vou Subindo". In February 1983 a record containing these songs was released.

== Release ==
=== Theatrical ===
As Aventuras da Turma da Mônica premiered at Cine Bristol on 19 December 1982. It opened on 23 December in São Paulo in a national circuit of eighty cinemas, and on 10 January 1983 in Rio de Janeiro. Mauricio later stated that exhibitors estimated between three and four million viewers, although official data from the Agência Nacional do Cinema (Ancine) recorded 1172020 spectators.

=== VHS and television ===
The film was released on VHS several times: in April 1985 by CIC Vídeo, in late 1987 or early 1988 by Trans Vídeo as part of a promotional package of three Monica's Gang VHS tapes, and in late 1998 by Publifolha as part of the "Clássicos da Turma da Mônica" collection. It was also broadcast on Rede Manchete on 12 October 1983.

== Legacy ==
The Adventures of Monica and Friends was the fourth Brazilian animated feature film, following Sinfonia Amazônica (1951), Presente de Natal (1971) and Piconzé (1972). In 1983 it was screened at the 33rd Berlin International Film Festival. The following year A Princesa e o Robô (1984) was released, inspired by the episode "O Império Empacota".

With 1.1 million viewers, The Adventures of Monica and Friends became the most-watched Brazilian animated film. It remained the most successful Monica's Gang film in theaters until 2019, when it was surpassed by the live-action production Monica's Gang: Bonds, which attracted more than two million spectators. In December 2017 the Brazilian Association of Film Critics ranked it the 12th greatest Brazilian animated film.
