= Anthology film =

Feature film consisting of several different short films

An anthology film (also known as an omnibus film, package film or portmanteau film) is a single film consisting of two or more shorter films, each complete in itself and distinguished from the other, though frequently tied together by a single theme, premise, or author. Sometimes each one is directed by a different director or written by a different author, or may even have been made at different times or in different countries. Anthology films are distinguished from "revue films" such as Paramount on Parade (1930)—which were common in Hollywood in the early decades of sound film, composite films, and compilation films.

Anthology films are often mistaken for hyperlink cinema. Hyperlink cinema shows parts of many stories throughout a film, whereas anthology films show story segments of one at a time. Some mistaken examples include Pulp Fiction (1994) and Amores Perros (2000), distributing their storylines non-chronologically, separated by segments.

== Notable films ==
- Intolerance (1916)
- Unheimliche Geschichten (1919)
- Unheimliche Geschichten (1932)
- If I Had a Million (1932)
- Fantasia (1940)
- Tales of Manhattan (1942)
- Flesh and Fantasy (1943)
- Dead of Night (1945)
- On Our Merry Way (1948)
- L'Amore (1948)
- Quartet (1948)
- Trio (1950)
- Encore (1951)
- O. Henry's Full House (1952)
- Actors and Sin (1952)
- Love in the City (1953)
- Siamo donne (1953)
- Invitation to the Dance (1956)
- Love and the Frenchwoman (1960)
- Teen Kanya (1961)
- Boccaccio '70 (1962)
- Love at Twenty (1962)
- Mondo Cane (1962)
- Black Sabbath (1963)
- The Devil and the Ten Commandments (1963)
- Ro.Go.Pa.G. (1963)
- Countersex (1964)
- My Wife (1964)
- The Yellow Rolls-Royce (1964)
- Kwaidan (1964)
- Operation Y and Shurik's Other Adventures (1965)
- Le bambole (1965)
- Dr. Terror's House of Horrors (1965)
- Six in Paris (1965)
- 4x4 (1965)
- Sex Quartet (1966)
- The Witches (1967)
- Chithramela (1967)
- Torture Garden (1967)
- The Illustrated Man (1968)
- Spirits of the Dead (1968)
- The House That Dripped Blood (1971)
- Tales from the Crypt (1972)
- Asylum (1972)
- Everything You Always Wanted to Know About Sex* (*But Were Afraid to Ask) (1972)
- How Funny Can Sex Be? (1973)
- The Vault of Horror (1973)
- From Beyond the Grave (1974)
- Trilogy of Terror (1975)
- It Can't Be! (1975)
- The Many Adventures of Winnie the Pooh (1977)
- Germany in Autumn (1978)
- Heavy Metal (1981)
- The Monster Club (1981)
- Creepshow (1982)
- The Adventures of Monica and Friends (1982)
- Nightmares (1983)
- Twilight Zone: The Movie (1983)
- Kaos (1984)
- The Company of Wolves (1984)
- Shake, Rattle & Roll series (1984–present)
- Cat's Eye (1985)
- The New Adventures of Monica and Friends (1986)
- Aria (1987)
- Creepshow 2 (1987)
- Rimini Rimini (1987)
- Moonwalker (1988)
- Martha, Ruth and Edie (1988)
- Rimini Rimini - Un anno dopo (1988)
- New York Stories (1989)
- Mystery Train (1989)
- Der Todesking (1990)
- Dreams (1990)
- Tales from the Darkside: The Movie (1990)
- Montreal Stories (1991)
- Night on Earth (1991)
- Necronomicon (1993)
- Twenty Bucks (1993)
- Chungking Express (1994)
- Strane storie - Racconti di fine secolo (1994)
- Four Rooms (1995)
- Rendezvous in Paris (1995)
- Tales from the Hood (1995)
- Cosmos (1996)
- Troublesome Night series (1997–2017)
- The Red Violin (1998)
- Fantasia 2000 (1999)
- Princes et Princesses (2000)
- The Animatrix (2003)
- Darna Mana Hai (2003)
- Coffee and Cigarettes (2003)
- Tears of Kali (2004)
- Eros (2004)
- Cine Gibi: O Filme (2004)
- Sin City (2005)
- Ek Mutho Chabi (2005)
- Hood of Horror (2006)
- Paris, je t'aime (2006)
- Wag Kang Lilingon (2006)
- Dus Kahaniyaan (2007)
- Batman: Gotham Knight (2008)
- Cu4tro (2009)
- Kerala Cafe (2009)
- Cinco (2010)
- Mirch (2010)
- Mahanagar@Kolkata (2010)
- Please Do Not Disturb (2010)
- The Road (2011)
- 24/7 in Love (2012)
- Ullas (2012)
- V/H/S (2012)
- Jekhane Bhooter Bhoy (2012)
- Movie 43 (2013)
- Bombay Talkies (2013)
- 5 Sundarikal (2013)
- Shorts (2013)
- All Hallows' Eve (2013)
- D Company (2013)
- The Profane Exhibit (2013)
- Tuhog (2013)
- V/H/S/2 (2013)
- Basanta Utsav (2013)
- Chaar (2014)
- Nirbaak (2014)
- The Chain (2014)
- Japy Ending (2014)
- Sin City: A Dame to Kill For (2014)
- V/H/S: Viral (2014)
- Wild Tales (2014)
- Teenkahon (2015)
- Madly (2016)
- A Gift (2016)
- Double Feluda (2016)
- Bleed. Scream. Beat! (2017)
- Rongberonger Korhi (2017)
- Solo (2017)
- The Ballad of Buster Scruggs (2018)
- Lust Stories (2018)
- Finally Bhalobasha (2019)
- Kathasangama (2019)
- Ghost Stories (2020)
- Omniboat: A Fast Boat Fantasia (2020)
- Unpaused (2020)
- Putham Pudhu Kaalai (2020)
- Paava Kadhaigal (2020)
- Pitta Kathalu (2021)
- Ankahi Kahaniya (2021)
- Ajeeb Daastaans (2021)
- The French Dispatch (2021)
- The Year of the Everlasting Storm (2021)
- Aanum Pennum (2021)
- V/H/S/94 (2021)
- Wheel of Fortune and Fantasy (2021)
- V/H/S/99 (2022)
- The House (2022)
- We Are Still Here (2022)
- Mystery Highway (2023)
- Lust Stories 2 (2023)
- Rain (2023)
- V/H/S/85 (2023)
- My Melbourne (2024)
- From Ground Zero (2024)
- Kinds of Kindness (2024)
- V/H/S/Beyond (2024)
- The Wonderful Story of Henry Sugar and Three More (2024)
- Father Mother Sister Brother (2025)
- The Follies (2025)
- Homo Argentum (2025)
- Predator: Killer of Killers (2025)
- Sunfish (& Other Stories on Green Lake) (2025)
- V/H/S/Halloween (2025)

== See also ==
- Anthology series
- Frame story
- List of animated package films
- List of horror anthology films
