= The New Adventures of Monica and Friends =

1986 Brazilian animated movie

- Promotional poster
- Directed by: Mauricio de Sousa
- Written by: Mauricio de Sousa
- Based on: Turma da Mônica by Mauricio de Sousa
- Produced by: Mauricio de Sousa
- Starring: Marli Bortoletto; Angélica Santos; Paulo Cavalcante Paulo Camargo; Elza Gonçalves Dias; Dirceu de Oliveira; Orlando Vigiani Filho; Jordão de Camargo; Nelson Batista; Nelson Machado Filho
- Production company: Mauricio de Sousa Produções
- Release date: September 20, 1986
- Running time: 56 minutes
- Country: Brazil

The New Adventures of Monica and Friends is a 1986 Brazilian animated compilation film directed by Mauricio de Sousa. It is the third film based on the Turma da Mônica comic book series, of which Mauricio is the creator. Like his first film, The Adventures of Monica and Friends, it is divided into stories, as Mauricio wanted these to be shown later on television. It was released for the first time on September 20, 1986. The film was successful in theaters and received a positive reception from the public. It was later shown at the Gramado and Brasilia Film Festivals and re-released on VHS.

== Synopsis ==
The New Adventures of Monica and Friends is divided into eight stories of between two and eight minutes, all interconnected by the appearance of Thunder (Jotalhão). The film begins with the story "Oh What a Day!", showing a clumsy Jimmy Five. Then, in "A Well-Trained Dog", the character trains his dog Fluffy (Floquinho) to defend himself against Monica's attacks, which doesn't work. In "The Vampire", Monica (Mônica) and Jimmy Five (Cebolinha) interact with a vampire who, in despair at Monica's actions, "decides to go back to the grave and sleep for another 100 years". Next, in "The Fountain of Youth", Jimmy Five's friends drink water from the wrong fountain, becoming increasingly childish. In "Last Wish", Monica surprises Smudge (Cascão) by obeying all of Jimmy's Five orders but gets her revenge in the end. "The Monster of the Lake" shows Chuck Billy (Chico Bento) defending an aquatic creature attacked by the population. "Smudge in the Tap Country" shows the character in a place full of water - an element of which Smudge is afraid. The last story is "The Big Show", featuring Monica, Jimmy Five, and Smudge in a performance.

== Cast ==
The voice actors for The New Adventures of Monica and Friends are presented below:

- Marli Bortoletto - Monica
- Angélica Santos - Jimmy Five
- Paulo Camargo - Smudge
- Elza Gonçalves - Maggy
- Dirceu de Oliveira - Chuck Billy
- Orlando Vigiani Filho - Franklin
- Jordão de Camargo Thunder
- Nelson Batista - Blu
- Nelson Batista Filho - Vampire

== Background and release ==
The first two feature films based on Monica and Friends (Turma da Mônica) by Mauricio de Sousa — 1982's The Adventures of Monica and Friends (Brazil: As Aventuras da Turma da Mônica) and 1984's The princess and the robot (Brazil: A Princesa e o Robô) — were relatively successful. The former was divided into stories and the latter contained just one story. Mauricio ended up preferring the movie format divided into stories since they could gradually be shown on television. He then followed this model for The New Adventures of Monica and Friends. The artistic direction and planning of the film are by Airon Barreto ("The Fountain of Youth"), Alcídio da Quinta ("The Monster of the Lake"), Canton ("The Vampire"), Kiko ("Smudge in the Tap country") and Mário Lantana and Paulo José ("The Big Show", "A Well-Trained Dog", "Oh What a Day!" and "Last Wish"). The music is by Silvia Goés, Eduardo Leão Waismann and Vinicius Pastana. There are two statements about the cost of the film. A Tribuna says that "the national release [cost] 3 million cruzados", while Folha de S.Paulo says that "to make the eight short films [...] 9 million cruzados were spent".

The release marked the debut of the band formed by the musicians who participated in the movie's soundtrack. At the same time, it was also announced that production would begin on a series of episodes for television. The film had a preview at the Palladium cinema in São Paulo on September 17, 1986.7 In that city, its official release took place three days later. In Rio de Janeiro, it was released on December 6. In total, the film was released in 120 cities. The release was co-sponsored by Danone. In São Paulo, the film was shown in "Zig-Zag sessions", only on Sunday mornings. The studio intended to release new films in this format, restructuring it. Monica and Friends New Adventures was released on VHS in January 1987 by Transvídeo and later at the end of 1998 by Publifolha, as part of the Monica and Friends Classics (Brazil: Clássicos da Turma da Mônica) collection. In 1987, it was shown at the Gramado Movie Festival and the Brasília Movie Festival.

== Reception ==
The New Adventures of Monica and Friends had a positive reception from the public, and was a success in theaters. In its first eight weeks in São Paulo, the film was at 60% capacity on Saturdays and sold out on Sundays, something that was similarly seen in other locations. In four cinemas in Rio de Janeiro, on the "Art" circuit, the film had an audience of 4,482 children. Jornal do Brasil noted the film's success in cinemas, but criticized "the anxiety of the children's participation, who during the screening wanted to interact with their old friends." Diário do Pará gave it a "reasonable" rating, without further comment.

== See also ==
- Monica and Friends
- Monica and Friends (tv series)
- Cine Gibi (franchise)
