= Cine Gibi (franchise) =

Films and magazines based on the Monica and Friends comics

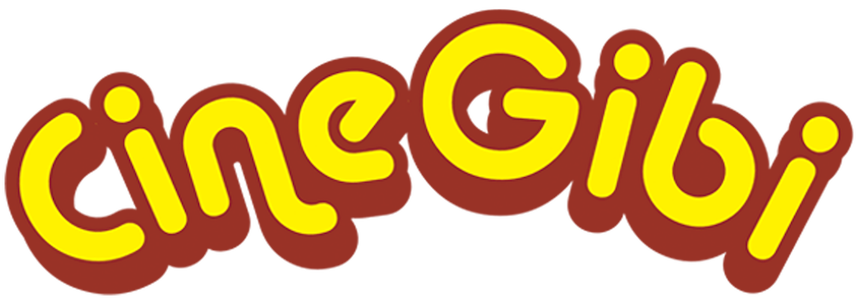
- Directed by: Mauricio de Sousa
- Based on: Cine gibi (2004)
- Production company: Mauricio de Sousa Produções
- Release date: 2004
- Country: Brazil
- Language: Portuguese

Cine Gibi is a Brazilian franchise of animated films and magazines based on the Monica and Friends comics by Mauricio de Sousa. The films revolve around a Franklin machine that reproduces comic books in movie format. The first, Cine Gibi, was released in 2004 after the appreciation of cinema in Brazil and was the only one in the series to be released in cinemas. In all, there are nine films in the franchise, and some films have spawned magazines with stories based on them. In general, Cine Gibi had a mixed reception.

== General information ==
The films in the Cine Gibi series center on a giant blender-shaped machine created by the character Franklin. This machine projects comic book stories in movie format, in a cinema session where the main characters, such as Monica, Maggy, Smudge and Jimmy Five, are present. The stories are adapted from the Monica and Friends comics.

=== Cast ===
The main voice actors in the Cine Gibi franchise are listed below.

- Marli Bortoletto – Monica
- Angélica Santos – Jimmy Five
- Paulo Cavalcante – Smudge
- Elza Gonçalves – Maggy
- Sibele Toledo – Franklin
- Dirceu de Oliveira – Chuck Billy

== History ==
Timeline of years since launch
2004	Cine gibi
2005	Cine gibi 2
2006
2007
2008	Cine gibi 3
2009	Cine gibi 4
2010	Cine gibi 5
2011
2012
2013	Cine gibi 6
2014	Cine gibi 7
2015	Cine gibi 8
2016	Cine gibi 9

The first Cine Gibi was made possible by the "valorization of national production"; Mauricio hadn't created any films for years. With a budget of 5 million reais and made "in a hurry" to coincide with the school vacation period, it was released in theaters on July 9, 2004. In October, it was released on DVD, the first with a sign language option. The sequel, Cine Gibi 2, was distinguished by the presence of the character Chuck Billy, who did not appear in the first film. Unlike the first, it was not released in cinemas, but directly on physical media on September 7, 2005. Forty thousand DVD units went on sale, promoted by Blockbuster and Nissin, and the film was also released on VHS. The stories from the movie were republished in Cine Gibi 2 - The Magazine (PT: A Revista), released in the same month by Editora Globo.

On December 5, 2008, the sequel to Cine Gibi 2 was released on DVD, Cine Gibi 3 - Foolproof plan (PT: Planos Infalíveis), focusing on stories about Jimmy Five. From October 2, 2009, Cine Gibi 4 - Boys and Girls (PT: Meninos e Meninas) began to be distributed on DVD. It was also reported that the first three DVDs in the series were available for purchase in a collector's case. In March of the following year, a magazine of the same name was launched based on the stories in the movie. Six months later, on the 28th, the sequel Cine Gibi 5 - Lights, Camera, Action! (PT: Luz, Camera, Ação!) was released and, in February 2011, it spawned a magazine of the same name. Cine Gibi 6 - Bath time (PT: Hora do Banho), focusing on the character Smudge, was released in 2013. The following year, Cine Gibi 7 - Animal Mess (PT: Bagunça Animal) was launched. In 2015, Cine Gibi 8 - Are you kidding? (PT: Tá Brincando?) was released. The last film in the series so far is Cine Gibi 9 - Let's Pretend! (PT: Vamos Fazer de Conta!), released in 2016.

== Reception ==
The first Cine Gibi, the only one to be released in theaters, attracted 31,658 spectators on the weekend of July 9–11, 2004. According to the Blockbuster Network, its DVD was the third best-seller for the week of January 3–10, 2005. Film critics analyzed only the first two films in the franchise, and generally had a mixed reception. For example, while CineClick called the stories in the first film "entertaining", Cineplayers said they were "no fun at all" and gave it a score of 3/10. Omelete and CineClick praised the technical quality, but UOL Cinema said it was "technically inferior to the cartoons of the 80s". There were two reviews of the second film: one from Folha de S.Paulo, with a rating of one star out of three, commenting that it wasn't as good as the first, and another from UOL Cinema, which gave it a rating of two stars out of five and said that the animation was "cleaner, but also more simplistic".

== See also ==
- Monica and Friends
- Monica and Friends (TV Series)
- The New Adventures of Monica and Friends
