= Cine Gibi: O Filme =

2004 film by José Márcio Nicolosi

- Theatrical release poster
- Directed by: José Márcio Nicolosi
- Written by: Airton Brreto; Emerson Bernado de Abreu; Flavio Teixeira de Jesus; José Márcio Nicolosi; Marcelo Verde; Márcio Araujo
- Based on: Monica's Gang by Mauricio de Sousa
- Produced by: Nilza Faustino; Fernando de Moraes Schier
- Starring: Airton Brreto; Emerson Bernado de Abreu; Flavio Teixeira de Jesus; José Márcio Nicolosi; Marcelo Verde; Márcio Araujo
- Music by: Márcio Araújo
- Production companies: Mauricio de Sousa Produções; TeleImage
- Distributed by: Paramount Pictures (through United International Pictures)
- Release date: 9 July 2004 (Brazil)
- Running time: 71 minutes
- Country: Brazil
- Language: Portuguese

Cine Gibi: O Filme (English: MovieComic: The Movie) is a 2004 Brazilian animated anthology film directed by José Márcio Nicolosi, based on the Monica's Gang comic books by Mauricio de Sousa. It was released theatrically in Brazil on 9 July 2004.

== Plot ==
Several comic stories are transformed into animations with the help of a machine invented by the character Franklin. These stories are:

- Quest for Isabelle's Nose (Em Busca do Nariz de Isabelle): Monica is setting up a 5000-piece puzzle, but gets stressed when the last piece is missing: Isabelle's nose. She then looks for Mr. Ding Ling, the salesman, and discovers that the last piece of the puzzle of Isabelle's portrait is hidden in the subsoil of the Limoeiro neighborhood, and with the help of Jimmy Five, she goes in search of that last fragment.
- Beauty Contest (Concurso de Beleza): Jimmy Five and Smudge explain to Monica that have a beauty contest in Limoeiro neighborhood, all the girls would participate and all the boys would vote. But they wanted to make a "marmalade" so they would not hurt.
- A Bucktoothed Love Story (Um Amor Dentuço): Jimmy Five and Smudge scoff Monica and begin to run away from it, she runs after them but tire quickly and give up. Suddenly, a vampire emerges wanting to turn Monica into a vampire, then he bites her without her noticing and she slowly turns into a vampire.
- The Samsonbuster (O Caça-Sansão): Monica's stuffed rabbit Samson is the victim of the invention of a mad scientist, and he becomes a huge monster. It is up to Jimmy Five capture it and return it to Monica in his original form.
- A Scenario for My Little Dolls (Um Cenário Para os Meus Bonequinhos): Smudge and Jimmy Five give wings to the imagination in charming children's games. By the time they arrive Monica and Maggy, they decide to give a feminine touch to the fun.
- Brother Smudge (Irmão Cascão): Jimmy Five decides to name his best friend as brother. He just did not have loose way of Smudge, which will occupy all the spaces of your home.

== Cast ==
- Marli Bortoletto as Monica
- Angélica Santos as Jimmy Five
- Elza Gonçalves as Maggy
- Paulo Cavalcante as Smudge
- Mauricio de Sousa as Blu
- Sibele Toledo as Franklin

=== Guest stars ===
The film features the following live-action guest stars:

- Mauricio de Sousa
- Luciano Huck
- Wanessa Camargo
- Fernanda Lima
- Pedro e Thiago

== See also ==
- Monica and Friends
- Cine Gibi (Franchise)
- Cine Gibi 2
- Monica e a Sereia do Rio
