= The Chain (2014 film) =

- Theatrical release poster
- Directed by: Miguel Barreda
- Written by: Miguel Barreda
- Produced by: Miguel Barreda
- Cinematography: Leandro Pinto Le Roux
- Edited by: Miguel Barreda
- Music by: Cristian Valdivia Astorga
- Production company: Vía Expresa Cine y Video
- Release dates: December 2014 (Ayacucho); April 2015 (Chicago); 3 September 2015 (Arequipa); 5 May 2016 (Lima)
- Running time: 87 minutes
- Country: Peru
- Language: Spanish

The Chain (Spanish: Encadenados) is a 2014 Peruvian anthology drama film written, directed and produced by Miguel Barreda. It presents ten stories, ten everyday characters in search of redemption in the midst of chaos, the realization of a dream or, simply, the question of what to do with their free time.

== Synopsis ==
Everything in this world is linked in a certain way. These are ten stories of betrayed women and men, pushed to the brink, with hope, with pain, lost, abandoned to their fate and their love. Immersed in their stories, they have no idea of the vicissitudes and discoveries they may face if something takes them out of their routine, but they share something: the fear of freedom. Julia and Ramiro, a common couple, with common fights and disagreements. Natalia and Vicente, thrown at the end of a relationship that doesn't give for more. Gino, a survivor thanks to the sale of drugs. Artemio, forever in love with Doña Clarita, the owner of the hotel where he abandons himself to alcohol and his memories. Patricio, who takes justice into his own hands. Susana, a loving mother who doesn't know what to do with her free time, and her husband, Tomás, Julia's lover.

== Cast ==
The actors participating in this film are:

- Martha Rebaza as Doña Clarita
- Arcadio Trujillo as Artemio
- Carlos Corzo Holguin as Patricio
- John Davila as Ramiro
- Lorena Pamo as Julia
- Norma Martínez as Susana
- Melania Urbina as Natalia
- Jorge “Pelo” Madueño as Tomás
- Miguel Iza as Vicente

== Financing ==
The film was one of the winners of the Fiction Feature Film Works Project Contest exclusive for the Peruvian regions - 2012 where he received S/.440,000 to finish the film.

== Release ==
It had its initial premiere at the Ayacucho International Film Festival in December 2014 where it won the Best Peruvian Film award. Then it premiered in April 20, 2015 at the 32nd Chicago Latino Film Festival, to later be released on September 3 of the same year in Arequipa cinemas. On May 5, 2016, it was released in the capital of the country.
