= Dorina Nowill =

Dorina de Gouvêa Nowill (28 May 1919 – 29 August 2010) was a Brazilian educator and philanthropist. She was a pioneer activist for the education of the blind in Brazil.

== Life and career ==
Dorina Nowill was born in São Paulo. She became blind at age 17 because of an eye infection, which led to bleeding. Blindness, however, did not stop her from pursuing a career in education.

In 1945, she managed to convince the Caetano de Campos school, where she attended the teaching profession and would graduate as a teacher, to implement the first course of teacher specialization for the education of the blind. At that time, Braille books in Brazil were very rare and she had to attend school as a normal student. After graduating, she traveled to the United States with a scholarship paid by the American government to attend a course of specialization in the area of visual deficiency, at Columbia University.

Back in Brazil, she concentrated on the founding of the country's first large-scale Braille publishing press. The publisher is one of the foundation's main sources of income, which has created and produces more than 80% of the Ministry of Education's books for the visually impaired, as well as receiving special orders for restaurants menus, airline safety instructions and bestsellers.

The educator also turned to the regulation of education for the blind. At the State Department of Education of São Paulo, she was responsible for the creation of the Department of Special Education for the Blind and in 1961, thanks to her commitment, the right to education to the blind became law. At the same time, from 1961 to 1973, she directed the first national blind education institution in Brazil, created by the Ministry of Education, as well as programs and projects that implemented services for the blind in various states of the nation, as well as events and campaigns for the prevention of blindness. Six years later, in 1979, the teacher was elected president of the World Council of the Blind. Later, she would be the founder and creator of the Fundação Dorina Nowill (Dorina Nowill Foundation) for the visually impaired.

In 1981, International Year of Disabled People, she was invited and spoke at the United Nations General Assembly as a Brazilian representative. Already in 1989, the National Congress ratified the International Labour Organization "Convention 1599", which deals with the rehabilitation, training and professionalization of the visually impaired. This was a further development of the work the educator had begun nearly two decades earlier with the first rehabilitation center for the blind created by her foundation.

Dorina was considered by Revista Época to be one of the 100 most influential Brazilians of the year 2009.

== Personal life ==
She married lawyer Edward Hubert Alexander Nowill (1923-2013), the son of an English Protestant pastor, whom she met in the United States while studying at Columbia University as a scholarship scholar for education and rehabilitation of blind people.

Dorina Nowill died at the age of 91, victim of a cardiac arrest. She was hospitalized about 15 days ago at Santa Isabel Hospital, in the west zone of São Paulo, to treat an infection. The funeral took place in the headquarters of the foundation that takes her name. Nowill left five children and twelve grandchildren.
