= Alfacinha =

Alfacinha is a term to denote a person from Lisbon, the etymology of which is unclear. The first known reference arises in the mid-19th century, in the book Travels in My Land by Almeida Garrett (1846), "For you shall be Alfacinhas forever, supposing that all the squares of this world are like the Palace Square ...".

According to one explanation, the term comes from the fact that in the region of Lisbon, lettuce (alface) is an abundant plant, and given the Arabic origin of the word, has been cultivated on a large scale during the Muslim period.
