= Márcio Araújo =

Márcio Araújo may refer to:

- Márcio Araújo (footballer, born 1960), Brazilian football manager and former football centre-back
- Márcio Araújo (volleyball) (born 1973), Brazilian volleyball player
- Márcio Araújo (footballer, born 1984), Brazilian football defensive midfielder
