= The Princess and the Robot =

1983 film directed by Maurício de Sousa

A Princesa e o Robô
- Directed by: Itsuo Nakashima
- Screenplay by: Itsuo Nakashima; José Márcio Nicolosi
- Story by: Mauricio de Sousa; Reinaldo Waisman
- Based on: Turma da Mônica by Mauricio de Sousa
- Produced by: Mauricio de Sousa
- Starring: André Luís; Marli Bortoletto; Angélica Santos; Paulo Camargo; Elza Gonçalves; Paulo Camargo
- Cinematography: J. Reinaldo Barbiratto; Joaquim F. Leite; José Perotti; Paulo de Oliveira
- Edited by: J. A. Ferreira
- Music by: Mauricio de Sousa; Márcio Roberto Araújo de Sousa; Eduardo Leão Waisman; Luciano Marques Simão
- Production companies: Black & White & Color
- Distributed by: Embrafilme
- Release date: January 16, 1984 (Brazil)
- Running time: 90 minutes
- Country: Brazil
- Language: Portuguese

The Princess and the Robot (Portuguese: A Princesa e o Robô) is a 1984 Brazilian animated film based on the Monica's Gang comic books. It was the second film based on Monica's Gang and the first to present an original story, since the other movies are just episodes of the cartoon, until the movie Uma Aventura no Tempo of 2007.

== Plot ==
In a small heart-shaped planet, there is a pulsating star that ends up shooting through space and lands on another planet, called Carrotland (Cenourano, in the original), striking a robot that is passionate about the princess of the kingdom where he lives: Princess Mimi.

The Robot (called Little Robot by the characters) fights for the hand of the princess in a tournament against many opponent. Among them is Lord Raider (Lorde Coelhão), a space traveler in search of fortune and wealth. The tournament ends with a tie between Raider and the Robot, and the famous coin toss is made, where the player chooses between heads or tails. Lord Raider chooses tails and the Robot chooses heads, so the coin is tossed.

The Robot wins the match, but Lord Raider, jealous, says that the Robot cannot marry the Princess, bringing up a rule that the Princess' betrothed must have a heart which, being a machine, the Robot does not. The King agrees, but says that the Robot has a chance to win the love of the Princess: he must journey to where the star is pulsating, pick it up and put it inside his engine so he will have a true heart. The King gives a small amount of time for the robot to reach the star: three days of Carrotland's time. If he does not return before his time is up, Lord Raider will marry the princess instead.

After that the robot walks without knowing what to do in the streets of the kingdom when he is attacked by Lord Raider, which uses its radius packer (a kind of weapon that stuffs its victims inside gift boxes when fired) and transforms it into a gift box.

That done, Lord Raider sends his assistants to leave the package in a place far from Carrotland. The robot assistants (led by Bugeye, a species of dragonfly, accomplice of Lord Raider) decide to throw the package on Planet Earth, where it falls near Jimmy Five's backyard. The impact of the landing is so strong, that the noise sounds like a blast. Monica and her friends hear the noise and runs to the direction of the package, open and release the Little Robot, that tells how he came to Earth. After the story is told, the gang decides to help him, asking Franklin to build a ship. But they do not know Bugeye had fallen along with the package and was listening to all the talk of the gang hiding behind a rock. He warns Lord Raider that the children will help the Robot find his heart.

== Voice cast ==
- André Luis as the Robot
- Marli Bortoletto as Monica
- Angélica Santos as Jimmy Five
- Elza Gonçalves as Maggy
- Paulo Camargo as Smugde
- Denise Simonetto as Angel
- Araquem Saldanha as Lord Raider
- Flora Maria Fernandes as Princess Mimi
- Orlando Vigiani Filho as Franklin
- Marthus Matias as the King of Carrotland
