= Looke (streaming platform) =

Brazilian streaming platform

Looke, LTDA
- Company type: Subsidiary
- Website type: OTT video streaming platform
- Area served: Brazil, Mexico
- Owners: Marcelo Spinassé; Encripta
- Key people: Cecília Refina Queiroz
- Website: www.looke.com.br
- Advertising: Yes
- Registration: Required
- Launched: April 28, 2015; 11 years ago
- Current status: Active

Looke is a Brazilian streaming platform dedicated to movies and series. Launched in April 2015, it is a video on demand service, in 2022 it filmed in partnership with Amazon and has a channel linked to Prime Video in Brazil and Mexico.

== History ==
In 2012, Encripta was founded, a company that licenses content to other companies. Encripta planned to launch a streaming platform in 2013 in partnership with a client, but the following year, when everything was already developed, the client canceled. Meanwhile, Netflix started to produce more original content and reduced the purchase of Encrypta products. With that, Marcelo Spinassé and Encripta launched Looke. The platform is part of the group's four business fronts.

The platform was officially launched on April 28, 2015, two months ahead of schedule, with around 12,000 titles. Commenting on Looke's film collection, Marcelo Spinassé said that, due to the budget, the catalog is different from Netflix and Amazon. "What we do is look for the best possible content that has not reached or interested these companies [...]. When content arrives at Encripta, the first one to receive it as a possibility is Netflix. If it says no, I offer it to others. If it doesn't manage to sell, it goes to Looke".

In June 2016, in a campaign carried out in partnership with the CNA language course, it distributed one million free vouchers to encourage students on the course. In October 2016, the content became available to watch offline (without an internet connection), starting with iOS and Android followed by Windows 10 and Windows Phone. In January 2017, old TV Globo programs became available on Looke with over 70 titles.

In August 2018, Looke launched its channel in the NOW app, for NET and Claro TV customers. In October 2018, Looke Kids for Apple TV was launched. Also in October, it streamed productions in partnership with Spcine Play.

In February 2019, it launched its Apple TV app. In July 2019, it started a partnership with operator Tim Brasil. In July 2019, it began streaming all episodes of the Portuguese telenovela Ouro Verde simultaneously with Rede Bandeirantes with the first two episodes available for free.

In September 2020, Looke became one of the channels on Prime Video (Brazil), alongside Paramount+, MGM (Metro-Goldwyn-Mayer), Starzplay and Noggin. Also in 2020, Arte 1 Play, the Arte 1 channel streaming service, was launched on the platform.

In April 2022, it was made available in Mexico, also as an Amazon Prime Video channel.
