= Monica and Friends (TV series) =

- Turma da Mônica
- Genre: Comedy; Adventure; Slice of life Science fiction Fantasy
- Created by: Maurício de Sousa
- Based on: Monica and Friends by Maurício de Sousa
- Voices of: Marli Bortoletto; Angélica Santos; Elza Gonçalves; Paulo Cavalcante; Sibele Toledo
- Country of origin: Brazil
- Original language: Portuguese
- No. of seasons: 25
- No. of episodes: 230

Production
- Running time: 6–7 minutes
- Production companies: Mauricio de Sousa Produções; Cartoon Network LA Original Productions (2017–22)

Original release
- Network: Rede Globo
- Release: December 11, 1976 – 2022

Related
- Monica and Friends

Monica and Friends (known as Turma da Mônica in Brazil, Mónica e Amigos in the European Portuguese dub and Monica's Gang in past translations) is a Brazilian series of animated cartoons based on the comic book Monica and Friends by Mauricio de Sousa. The series ran on Cartoon Network from 2004 to 2025 and previously on Globo until 2014. It also airs on TV Cultura (since 2017), HBO Max (since 2021), Discovery Kids (since 2025) and Band (since 2026).

Six DVDs with episodes of the series were released, distributed by Paramount Home Entertainment. New episodes were released in nine Cine Gibi movies. New episodes were posted on the programme's official YouTube channel after they aired on Cartoon Network.

== Episodes ==
The show consists of 230 cartoons produced and released from 1976 to 2022. Of each episode, 83 cartoons were originally included as part of a film. The remaining 147 cartoons were grouped under a blanket title dubbed Monica and Friends and released individually.

=== The pilot (1976) ===
No.	Original title	Translated title
1	O Natal da Turma da Mônica	The Christmas of Monica and Friends

=== Episodes from As Aventuras da Turma da Mônica (1982) ===
No.	Original title	Translated title
2	O Plano Infalível	The Infallible Plan
3	Um Amor de Ratinho	Cute Little Mouse in Love
4	A Ermitã	I Wanna Be Alone
5	O Império Empacota	The Empire Gets Wrapped

=== Episodes from As Novas Aventuras da Turma da Mônica (1986) ===
No.	Original title	Translated title
6	Oh, Que Dia!	Gee, What a Day
7	Um Cachorro Bem Treinado	Cool Dog
8	O Vampiro	Monica Spooks the Vampire
9	A Fonte da Juventude	The Fountain of Youth
10	O Último Desejo	The Last Wish
11	Chico Bento em: O Monstro da Lagoa	Chuck Billy in: The Lake Monster
12	Cascão no País das Torneirinhas	Smudge in Faucetland
13	O Grande Show	The Big Show

=== Episodes from A Sereia do Rio (1986) ===
No.	Original title	Translated title
14	A Gruta do Diabo	The Devil's Cave
15	Jacaré de Estimação	The Pet Lizard
16	O Tocador de Sinos	Jingle the Bell
17	A Sereia do Rio	The River Mermaid

=== Episodes from O Bicho Papão (1987) ===
No.	Original title	Translated title
18	Quero Entrar!	Let Me In!
19	Montanha Suja	Dirty Rocky
20	O Bicho-papão	Who's Afraid of The Bogeyman
21	O Ogro da Floresta	The Terrible Forest Ogre

=== Episodes from A Estrelinha Magica (1988) ===
No.	Original title	Translated title
22	Super Heróis	Super Heroes
23	Um Dia de Cão	A Dog's Day
24	O Detetive	The Detective
25	A Estrelinha Mágica	The Magic Little Star

=== Episodes from Chico Bento, Oia a Onça! (1990) ===
No.	Original title	Translated title
26	O Causo da Melancia	The Story of the Watermelon
27	O Causo do Burrico	The Story of the Donkey
28	O Causo dos Sapo	The Story of the Frog
29	A Verdade Dói	Truth Hurts
30	O Causo do Ovo	The Story of the Egg
31	O Canto do Sabiá	The Thrush's Song
32	O Causo das Formigas	The Story of the Ants
33	Chico Bento em: Oia a Onça!	Chuck Billy in: Watch the Jaguar!

=== Episodes from O Natal de Todos Nós (1992) ===
No.	Original title	Translated title
34	O Natal do Horácio	Horacio's Christmas
35	O Natal do Jotalhão	Thunder's Christmas
36	O Natal da Mônica	Monica's Christmas
37	O Natal do Cebolinha	Jimmy Five's Christmas
38	O Natal do Cascão	Smudge's Christmas
39	O Natal da Magali	Maggy's Christmas
40	O Natal do Bidu	Blu's Christmas
41	O Natal do Chico Bento	Chuck Billy's Christmas
42	O Natal do Anjinho	Angel's Christmas
43	O Natal do Astronauta	Bubbly's Christmas

=== Episodes from Quadro a Quadro (1996) ===
No.	Original title	Translated title
44	Algo Verde, Mole e Pegajoso	Something Green, Soft and Sticky
45	Ta Morto... Ou Não Tá?	Is He Dead…or Not?
46	Branca de Fome e os Sete Anões	Hungry White and the Seven Dwarfs
47	Game ao Vivo	Game on Live

=== Episodes from O Mônico (1997) ===
No.	Original title	Translated title
48	O Mônico	Jimmonica
49	Chico Bento no Shopping	A Trip to the Mall
50	Como Atravessar a Sala	Crossing the Room
51	Frank em: Ser Criança	Frank in: Never a Child

=== Episodes from O plano sangrento (1998) ===
No.	Original title	Translated title
52	O Plano Sangrento	The Icky Sticky Plan
53	Na Roça é Differente	It's Diff'rent Down on the Farm
54	Astronauta	Bubbly: Cosmic Love Quest
55	Duelos em Quadrinhos	A Cartoon Duel

=== Episodes from O estranho soro do Dr. X (1998) ===
No.	Original title	Translated title
56	Coisa de Louco	Nutty Ned's House
57	Comida Fresca	Yummy Food
58	A História do Galo Ataliba	The Rooster Ataliba's Tale
59	A Turma no Zoológico	In the Zoo
60	O Estranho Soro do Doutor X	The Day Jimmy Five Disappeared

=== Episodes from A ilha misteriosa (1999) ===
No.	Original title	Translated title
61	A Ilha Misteriosa	Sand, Sea and Surprises
62	Regras e excessões	Rules and Exceptions
63	Chico Mico	Monkey Business
64	Mingau com Chuva	Rainy Day Vanilla

=== 2002 episodes ===
No.	Original title	Translated title
65	Oi, eu sou a Mônica!	I Am Monica...
66	Oi, eu sou o Cebolinha!	I Am Jimmy Five...
67	Oi, eu sou o Cascão!	I Am Smudge...
68	Oi, eu sou a Magali!	I Am Maggy...
69	Era Uma Vez...	Once Upon a Time...
70	O Guarda-Chuva Voador	Smudge and the Flying Umbrella
71	Um Dia no Circo	Let's Go to the Circus
72	Um Doente, Sua Irmã e o Grande Campeonato de Cuspe a Distância	Sunny, His Big Sister and Spitting Contest!!
73	Bichinhos sem Pelúcia	Cool Cuts
74	Perdidos no Meio do Nada	Lost in the Middle of their Mess
75	Um Natal Glacial	A Glacial Christmas

=== Episodes from Cine Gibi: O Filme (2004) ===
No.	Original title	Translated title
76	Em Busca do Nariz de Isabelle	Looking for Isabelle's Nose
77	Concurso de Beleza	Monica and the Beauty Pageant
78	Um Amor Dentuço	A Bucktooth Love
79	O Caça-Sansão	The Hunt for Blue Samson
80	Um Cenário para os meus Bonequinhos	A Play Set for the My Little Action Figures
81	Irmão Cascão	Brother Smudge

=== Episodes from Cine Gibi 2 (2005) ===
No.	Original title	Translated title
82	Os Tênis da Mônica	The Tennis Shoes
83	O baile Frank	The Frank at the Costume Party
84	Poeirinha Mágica	Little Magic Dust
85	Chapeuzinho Vermelho 2	Little Red Riding Hood 2
86	O Sumiço de Todas as Mães	Where Did All the Moms Go
87	Boas Maneiras	Good Manners Classes
88	Chico Bento em: A hora da onça beber água	The Thirsty Jaguar

=== Episodes from Cine Gibi 3 - Planos Infalíveis (2008) ===
No.	Original title	Translated title
89	Plano Hipnótico	Hypnotic Plan
90	O Sumiço da Jujuba	Jelly Bean Gone Missing
91	Plano Levemente Infalível	A Slightly Foolproof Plan
92	O Álbum de Fotografias	Photo Album
93	Diga o que eu digo e faça o que eu faço	Say What I Say and Do What I Do
94	Cor de rosa	The Color Pink
95	O dia em que Cebolinha desistiu dos planos infalíveis	The Day Jimmy Five Quit His Foolproof Plans

=== 2009–10 episodes ===
These flash-animated episodes were firstly released for Brazilian Cartoon Network, and later, as parts of Cine Gibi 4 - Meninos e Meninas and Cine Gibi 5 - Luz, Camera, Ação!.

No.	Original title	Translated title	Writer(s)	Storyboard(s)
96	Os Cinco Fios de cabelos Mágicos	Five Magic Threads		
97	Os Brincos Novos que a Mamãe Comprou	The New Earrings That Mom Bought		
98	Venha à Minha Festinha	Must Bring Doll (Note: Come to My Party)		
99	Mônica, a Famosa	The Famous Monica		
100	Patins... Para mim?	Skates... for Me?		
101	Brincando de Boneca **	Playing House (Note: Later retitled to "Playing Doll")		
102	O Corpo Fala	Body Language	Emerson B. Abreu	
103	A Nova Babá	The New Babysitter		
104	Máquina do Tempo, de Novo?	Time Machine - Part II/The Time Machine...Again?		
105	A Minhoca Encantada	The Enchanted Worm		
106	... E assim se Passaram Trinta Anos	... And so, Thirty Years Have Passed		
107	Abduzidos?	Abducted?		
108	Turma da Mônica Contra o Capitão Feio	Monica and Friends Against Captain Fray, the Musical		
109	Os Azuis	The Blue Ones		
110	Jogo de Vôlei	Volleyball Match		
111	Um Coelhinho de Verdade	A Bunny Indeed		
112	Folias no Clube	Follies at the Club		
113	A árvore de natal	The Christmas Tree		

=== Rede Globo specials (2010–2013) ===
Nº	Original title	Translated title
114	As Doze Badaladas dos Sinos de Natal	The Twelve Strokes of Christmas Bells
115	Bruxarias no aniversário	Birthday Witchcraft
116	Um conto de páscoa	An Easter Tale
117	Um plano para Salvar o Planeta	A Plan to Save the Planet
118	Linda noite de natal	Pretty Christmas Night
119	Véspera de Natal	Christmas Eve

=== Cartoon Network episodes (2012–2018) ===
Nº	Original title	Translated title
120	Do que Você está Brincando?	What Are You Playing?
121	Arte na Praça	Art at the Park
122	O Anel da Discórdia	The Ring of Discord
123	Perdidos no Meio do Quarto	Lost in the Middle of Bedroom
124	Vai Brincar lá Fora, Cebolinha!	Go Play There Outside, Jimmy Five!
125	Peteca	Shuttlecock
126	Chamadas à Longas Distâncias	Long-Distance Phone Calls
127	Brincadeiras Modernas	Modern Games
128	O Topetinho Mutante	The Mutant Quiff
129	Os Namorados	Boyfriend and Girlfriend
130	O Teatro de Fantoches	The Puppet Show
131	Não sei o Nome disso, mas é muito Divertido	I Don't Know What This is Called, But It's Fun
132	Amarra ou Larga do Pé, Cebolinha!	Tie Up or Let Up, Jimmy Five
133	As Fantasias de Carnaval	The Carnival Costumes
134	No Reino do Bueiro	Jimmy Five Against Captain Fray, in the Kingdom of the Manhole
135	Provas Comprometedoras	Compromissing Proof
136	Cinema em Casa	Cinema at Home
137	Socorro, Polícia! Pega Ladrão!	Help, Police! Catch the Thief!
138	Os Quatro Músicos do Bairro do Limoeiro	The Four Musicians from Lemon Neighborhood
139	Intrigas Interplanetárias	Interplanetary Plot
140	Muito Silêncio, Por Favor!	Silence, Please!
141	O Show de Perseguições	The Persecution Show
142	Alguém pra Cuidar de Mim	Someone to care of Me
143	Mônica em Câmera Lenta	Monica in Slow Motion
144	Mônica? Que Mônica?	Monica? What Monica?
145	O Coelhinho Amarelo	The Yellow Bunny
146	Inseturminha	Insekids
147	Duas Princesas e um Pestinha	Two Princesses and a Little Brat
148	O assassino	The Killer
149	Para cada Anjo, um Pestinha	There's a Brat for Every Angel
150	Faça um Pedido!	Make a Wish!
151	Depois do Banho	After the Bath
152	O Dia em que Derrotei a Mônica	The Day I Defeated Monica
153	Tem uma Estranha no Meu Banheiro	There is a Stranger in my Bathroom
154	Coqueluche	The Scarf
155	O Dia em que o Cascão fugiu de Casa... De novo	The Day Smudge Ran Away from Home… Again
156	Rei por um Dia	King for a Day
157	Cuidado com o Apagão	Beware of the Blackout
158	O Menino do Boné Amarelinho	The Boy with the Yellow Cap
159	O Plano Luca	The Luca Plan
160	Quem Bate?	Knock Knock
161	Uma Senhora Faxina	A Monster Cleanup
162	Todos os Coelhos	All the Bunnies
163	Presente de Grego	Trojan Bunny
164	A Casa na Árvore	The Tree House
165	Dono de Metade da Rua	Ruler of the Half the Street
166	Coincidências	Coincidences
167	Feliz com o meu Brinquedo	Happy with My Toy
168	Rei e Rainha da Rua	King and Queen of the Street
169	O Plano da Falsa Amiga	The False Friend Plan
170	Barulho Além da Janela	The Noise Behind the Window
171	Poeta de Lanchonete	The Diner Poet
172	Reunião no Clubinho	Club Meeting
173	Meu Bolo é de Bruxa?	A Witch's Cake?
174	Sozinho no Mundo	All Alone in the World
175	Hoje eu vou tomar Banho!	Today I'll Bath!
176	Cada um na sua História	To Each Their Own Game
177	Aniversário Macabro	A Creepy Birthday
178	A Grande Final	The Great Final
179	Uma Piada Muito Louca	A Crazy Joke
180	O Quarto Posterizado	The Postered Up Bedroom
181	Vida de Gente Grande	Grown-Up Life
182	Versus Versus Versus	Versus Versus Versus
183	Planos Infalíveis	Infailble Plans
184	Dá uma Chance!	Give It a Chance!
185	Reptilianos	Reptilians

=== Rede Globo episodes (2013) ===
Nº	Original title	Translated title
186	Muita Confusão para um só Monicão	A Huge Mess for a Small Dude
187	O Final Infalível de um Plano Infalível	The Foolproof Ending of a Foolproof Plan
188	A Revolta dos Carecas	Bald Rebellion
189	Campo de Guerra	War Zone
190	Não morda Tudo que Voa	Stop Bite Everything That Flies
191	Isso não vai fazer bem para minha imagem	This Is Going to Ruin My Reputation
192	O Anel da Coragem	Courage Ring
193	Um Porquinho incomoda muita Gente	One Little Pig Bother Many People
194	Patinando na Cera	Skating on Wax
195	A Máquina de Lavar Assombrada	The Haunted Washing Machine
196	Pega pra Mim?	Get That for Me?
197	A Cozinha já não é um Lugar Seguro	The Kitchen Is Not More a Safe Place Anymore!
198	Não perca a Cabeça!	Don't Lose Your Head!
199	Quem foi que fez pipi aqui?	Who Pee in Here?
200	Um Dia Muito Especial	A Very Special Day

=== TV Cultura shorts (2017) ===
Nº	Original title	Translated title
201	A Cabeleireira	The Hairdresser
202	A Rua do Cebolinha	Jimmy Five Street
203	Brincando de Casinha	Playing House
204	Improviso	Improvise

=== Cartoon Network/HBO Max episodes (2021–2022) ===
Nº	Original title	Translated title
205	A Corrida do Século	The Race of the Century
206	A Cadeira Sumiu	The Missing Wheelchair
207	A Culpa é Sempre dos Outros	The Fault is Always the Others
208	O Buraco	The Hole
209	O Segredo da Múmia	The Secret of the Mummy
210	O Mestre Zen	The Zen Master
211	Uma Noite de Cão	A Dog's Night
212	O Monstro da Piscina	The Pool Monster
213	Melhores Amigos para Sempre	Best Friends Forever
214	O Babado do Cão Falante	The Gossip of the Talking Dog
215	Tem um Pestinha no Banheiro	A Brat in the Bathroom
216	Bugado	Glitched
217	Os Outros Sentidos	The Other Senses
218	A Grande Gincana	The Great Scavenger Hunt
219	O Fantasma de Todos os Medos	The Phantom of All Fears
220	Não tem Gostosura	There Is No Treat
221	O Mistério do Cascão	The Mystery of Smudge
222	Quem não tem cão, caça com Árvore	Who Can't Hunt with Dog, Hunts with Tree
223	O Mundo ao Contrário	The Opposite World
224	Gibis pra que te quero	Comic Books for the Sake of It
225	A Melancia	The Watermelon
226	Coelho por um dia	Wabbit for a Day
227	A Nova Dona da Rua	New Owner of the Street
228	Os Perigos da Noite	The Dangers of the Night
229	Eu quero ir à Praia	I Want to Go to the Beach
230	Tô de Mal	I'm Mad

== Voice cast ==
Character	Portuguese (BR) (Original)	Portuguese (EU)	English
Monica	Marli Bortoletto	Joana Castro	Fran Capo (1990–2018); Gabriela Piccoli (2019–2022)
Jimmy Five	Angélica Santos	Joana Castro	Stephanie Pearson (1990–2018); Ulises Otero (2019–2022; secondary); Julia Sales (2020–2022; primary)
Smudge	Paulo Cavalcante	Tiago Retrê	James Carter Cathcart (1990–2018); Roly Gutierrez (2019–2022)
Maggy	Elza Gonçalves	Patrícia Andrade	Amy Bennett (1990–2018); Lissa Grossman (2019–2022)

== Monica Toy ==
Monica Toy (Portuguese: Mônica Toy, previously Turma da Mônica Toy) is an animated series created by Bruno Honda launched on May 23, 2013 and produced by the studio for Tok & Stok's official YouTube channel to celebrate the 50th anniversary of Monica. The animation, done in chibi toy art, traces shows 30-second episodes with Monica, Jimmy Five, Smudge and Maggy, with characters such as Blu, Mauricio, Chuck Billy making occasional appearances.
