= Rubens Ewald Filho =

Brazilian journalist and actor (1945–2019)

- Born: 7 March 1945; Santos, São Paulo, Brazil
- Died: 19 June 2019 (aged 74); São Paulo, Brazil
- Education: Universidade Católica de Santos
- Occupations: Journalist, film critic. television presenter, actor, filmmaker and stage director

Rubens Azevedo Ewald Filho (7 March 1945 – 19 June 2019) was a Brazilian journalist, film critic, television presenter, actor, filmmaker and stage director.

== Career ==
A graduate of the Catholic University of Santos (UniSantos), Ewald Filho has worked for the country's largest media outlets, among them Rede Globo, SBT, Grupo Record (portal R7 and Record News), RedeTV!, TV Cultura (where he began his career), Veja magazine, Jovem Pan, and Folha de S. Paulo, as well as HBO, Telecine and TNT, where he ran the program TNT+Filme and the coverage of the Oscars.)

He was also the film critic for Rádio Bandeirantes and commented on the films shown on Rede Bandeirantes' Cine Clube. The critic also appeared in program inserts on A Tarde FM radio in Salvador (Bahia). He was also Secretary of Culture in Paulínia (São Paulo).

== Death ==
After falling down an escalator and fainting in May 2019, Rubens Ewald Filho was admitted to Samaritano Hospital in São Paulo in serious condition. He underwent cardiological treatment and treatment for fractures resulting from the fall, but he couldn't resist, and after almost a month in the hospital's ICU, he died on 19 June, coincidentally the National Day of Brazilian Cnema. In October 2020, as a tribute, room number 3 at Petra Belas Artes movie theater was renamed after him.

== Works ==
=== Screenwriter and author ===
- Éramos Seis (1994)
- Iaiá Garcia (1982)
- Casa de Pensão (1982)
- O Pátio das Donzelas (1982)
- A Viuvinha (1981) - Teleconto TV Cultura
- Um Homem muito Especial (1980)
- Drácula, Uma História de Amor (1980)
- Gina (1978)
- Éramos Seis (1977)
- A Árvore dos Sexos (1977)
- Elas São do Baralho (1977)

=== Actor ===
- Amor Estranho Amor (1982)
- A Casa das Tentações (1975)
- Independência ou Morte (1972)
- As Gatinhas (1970)
- A Herança (1970)

=== Stage director ===
- O Amante de Lady Chatterley, by D. H. Lawrence, adaptation by Germano Pereira. Cast Germano Pereira, Ana Carolina Lima and Ailton Guedes
- Querido Mundo, by Miguel Falabella. Cast: Maximiliana Reis e Jarbas Homem de Mello
- Doce Veneno - adaptation of the book O Doce Veneno do Escorpião, by Bruna Surfistinha. Cast: Ellen Roche, Gerson Steves, Luciana Ramanzini, Thalita Lippi and Tony Germano

=== Book ===
- O Oscar e Eu (2003)

=== Television presenter ===
- RedeTV!
- Rede Bandeirantes
- Record News
- TV Cultura
