= Blu (Monica and Friends) =

- Monica's Gang character
- Blu in his current visual
- First appearance: July 18, 1959 (comic strip)
- Voiced by: Odair Batista; Maurício de Sousa

In-universe information
- Species: Dog (Schnauzer)
- Gender: Male
- Family: Franklin (owner)

Blu (Bidu) is a character in the Brazilian comic strip Monica's Gang, created in 1959. He was the first character created by Maurício de Sousa, along with his owner Franklin (Franjinha). The character appears in the logo and is the mascot of Mauricio de Sousa Produções, the company founded by Sousa to release his works.

Blu is the only character who appears in two different kinds of stories. In one, he is a normal dog, owned by Franklin, who fears taking baths (but is invariably forced to take them by Franklin), does anything in exchange for a bone, and plays around with the other dogs from the neighborhood. In the other type of stories, he is a director-actor of his own stories, is highly anthropomorphic, walking on two legs behind the sets (and walking like a normal dog when acting), and is famous for the comic strips in which he talks to objects, especially the rock called Mrs. Stone.

== History ==
Cover of the first issue of Blu comic, published in 1960

Mauricio says he has based both Blu and Franklin on himself and Cuíca, the dog he had when he was a child. His first appearance was in 1959 in the comic strip Bidu e Franjinha published in the newspaper Folha da Manhã. The very first stories had the boy Franklin (Blu's owner) and his friends Bucky, Jeremiah, Manezinho and Hummer as protagonists. In 1960, through a partnership with the publisher Editora Outubro, Mauricio de Sousa collaborated making stories of his characters to children's magazine Zaz Traz, while in the same year he created Blu and Franklin's own magazine, titled Bidu by Continental. But the comic was canceled in the same year after only eight issues.

In 1961 he and Franklin became supporting characters for Jimmy Five after he became the protagonist, however stories with him and Franklin kept being published for many years. In 1963, when Mauricio founded his own studio, the project was originally called Bidulândia Serviços de Empresa (now known as Mauricio de Sousa Produções) in tribute to the character. In the 1970s and '80s the Blu and Franklin stories became less and less frequent. Franklin went on to be a recurring character for Monica, Jimmy Five, Smudge and Maggy, while Blu went on to starring in both solos stories and stories with Franklin.

Since the 1960s, Blu doesn't have his own printed comics, but when he celebrated his 40th anniversary, a special edition was released in remembrance, titled Bidu – Especial 40 Anos (Blu – 40 Years Special). Blu also had an almanac with classic stories that was published by Panini Comics between 2008 and 2014 (returning in 2020) called Almanaque Bidu & Mingau, in this almanac Blu stories were published along with stories focused in Vanilla, Maggy's pet cat.

== Related characters ==
- Franklin (Franjinha) – Blu's owner and the brains of the gang. The only character who is closely related both to Blu and to Monica and her friends, apart from Duke. He keeps a personal laboratory attached to his house. In there, he concocts all sorts of things, including complex machines such as time machines, teleporters, robots, etc., not always with success. He is in love with Marina, the artist of the gang, even though she has no interest in him.
- Duke (Duque) – Blu's best friend, appears mostly on the stories in which Blu is a normal dog.
- Glu (Bugu) – Glu is not an enemy, but usually annoys Blu by doing almost everything to take part of his strips. Blu never accepts, so Glu sees himself forced to perform his famous "imitations", even against Blu's wills. However, in the end he is always kicked off the strip (literally). He always says "Alô, mamãe!" (Hello, mommy!) when he enters the strip, and "Tchau, mamãe!" (Bye, mommy!), when he is kicked off. He has also appeared as Mister B (a reference to the magician Mr. M), a great magician who everybody thought to be Blu. Glu was one of the few characters not conceived by de Sousa himself, but by his brother Márcio, who describes him as his "self-prortrait" for always trying to "steal his famous brother's show".
- Manfred (Manfredo) - Blu's main assistant, appears almost exclusively on the strips in which Blu is a director/actor. He is a secretary, producer, and arranger and is always carrying a clipboard.
- Mrs. Stone (Dona Pedra) – The most famous object that talks to Blu. A single grey stone, which cannot move. She mostly engages in philosophical conversations with Blu, or just talks about daily issues.
- Fog (Zé Esquecido) – As his Portuguese name suggests (roughly translated as Forgetful Joe), this character was introduced in 2003 and suffers from amnesia, affecting his short-term memory.

== Reception and legacy ==
Blu is considered an iconic character in Brazil, especially when it comes to his creator Mauricio de Sousa. In 2014 a graphic novel starring the character entitled Bidu - Caminhos was published by Eduardo Damasceno and Luis Felipe Garrocho being part of the Graphic MSP collection. This graphic novel had a sequel in 2016 titled Bidu - Juntos.
