= Brazilian comics =

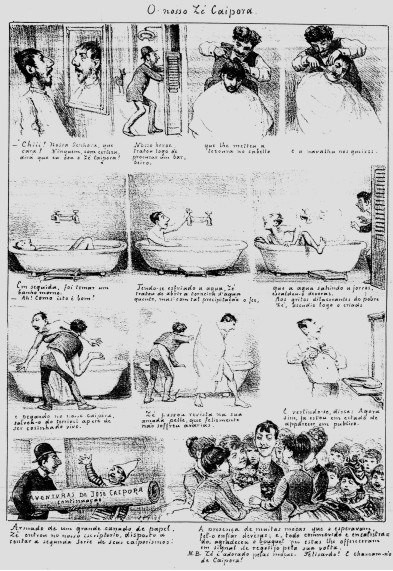
- Zé Caipora from 1886.
- Earliest publications: 19th century
- Publishers: Conrad Editora; Editora Globo; Editora JBC; Panini Comics
- Publications: O Tico-Tico; O Globo Juvenil; As Aventuras de Roberto Sorocaba
- Creators: Angelo Agostini; J. Carlos; Roberto Marinho; Roger Cruz; Mike Deodato
- Series and characters: "Turma do Pererê" "Monica's Gang" "O Menino Maluquinho" "Senninha" "Sítio do Picapau Amarelo" "Geraldão"
- Languages: Brazilian Portuguese

Related articles

Brazilian comics (known in Brazilian Portuguese as HQs, gibis, revistinhas, historietas, quadrinhos or tirinhas) started in the 19th century, adopting a satirical style known as cartoon, charges or caricature that would later be cemented in the popular comic strips. The publication of magazines dedicated exclusively to comics, in Brazil, started at the beginning of the 20th century. Brazilian artists have worked with both styles.

== History ==
=== Precursors and initial steps (1837–1895) ===
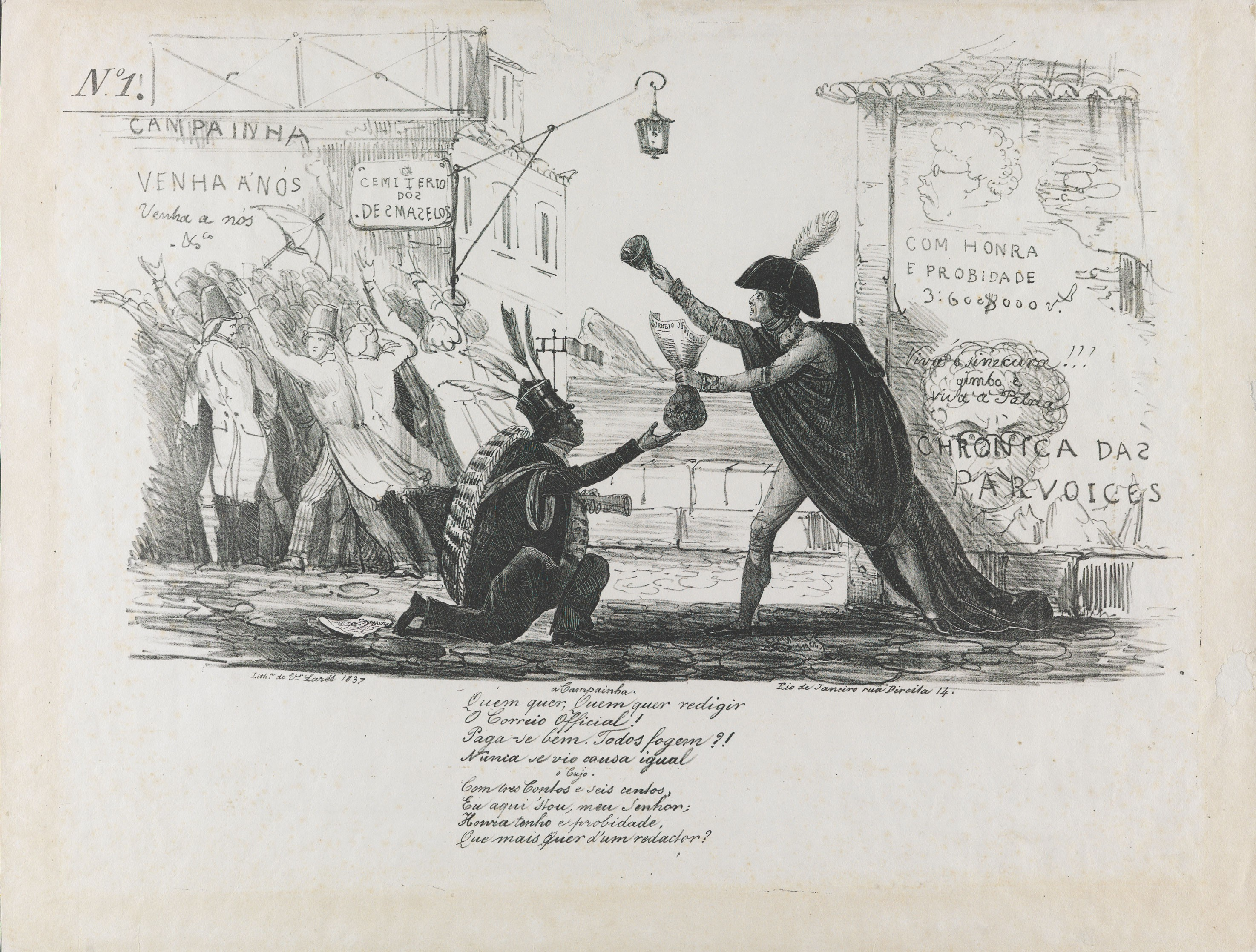
First Brazil editorial cartoon, by Manuel de Araújo Porto-alegre (1837).

Brazilian comics have a long history, that goes back to the 19th century. As a charge, the first drawing was circulated in 1837, sold in separate like a lithography, by Manuel de Araújo Porto-alegre. This author would later create a magazine of political humor in 1844.

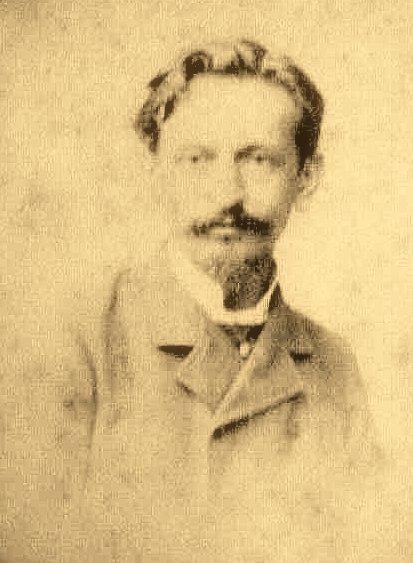
Angelo Agostini, pioneer of Brazilian comics.

In the late 1860s, Angelo Agostini continued the tradition of introducing the Brazilian journalistic and popular publications, drawings with themes of political and social satire. Between his most popular characters, drawn as protagonists of stories in comics, were Nho Quim (1869) and Zé Caipora (1883). Agostini published in magazines like Vida Fluminense, O Malho, and Don Quixote.

=== O Tico-Tico (1905-1957) ===
Released on October 11, 1905, the magazine O Tico-Tico is considered the first comic book in the country. Designed by the cartoonist Renato de Castro, the project was presented to Luís Bartolomeu de Souza e Silva, the owner of the magazine O Malho (where Angelo Agostini worked after the cancellation of Don Quixote). After being approved, the magazine was attended by Angelo Agostini, who created the logo and some stories. The format was inspired by the French children's magazines Le Petit Journal Illustre de la jeunesse, Le Jeudi de La jeunesse and La Semaine de Suzette, which had some of its characters adapted to a Brazilian version. The magazine had the collaboration of renowned artists such as J. Carlos (responsible for the graphic changes in 1922), Max Yantok, and Alfredo Storni.

The most successful character in the magazine was Chiquinho (published between 1905 and 1958), considered for many years an original Brazilian creation (however, in recent publications the character has been accused of being a rip-off of the American character Buster Brown). Other characters who starred in the magazine were Reco-Reco, Bolão e Azeitona by Luiz Sá, Lamparina by J. Carlos, Kaximbown by Max Yantok, Max Muller by A. Rocha, and others.

In the 1930s, some American strips and characters, such as Mickey Mouse, Krazy Kat, and Felix the Cat, were published in the magazine. J. Carlos was the first Brazilian artist to draw characters from the Walt Disney Company in the pages of Tico-Tico.

The magazine lost popularity in the 1930s when new comic books and newspaper comic strips were released in Brazil. The magazine ended in 1957, with some republications until 1977.

=== Supplements and the creation of the publishers ===
In September 1929, the newspaper A Gazeta creates a comic supplement in tabloid format, based on the Sunday supplements of the American comics; in the following month, Casa Editorial Vecchi (an Italian origin publisher) published the magazine: Mundo Infantil, but the success of the supplements was given in 1934 with the creation of the magazine Suplemento Infantil (later renamed as Suplemento Juvenil) by Adolfo Aizen. Aizen was known to work in the newspaper O Globo, and also in magazines O Malho and O Tico-Tico. His project was loosely inspired by American comics, he formed partnerships to publish the stories with characters like Flash Gordon, Mandrake the Magician, Donald Duck, Popeye, along original characters created by Brazilian artists as As Aventuras de Roberto Sorocaba.

With the success of the magazine other magazine supplements were created in the following years, among them the one that earned popularity was O Globo Juvenil, created by Roberto Marinho to compete against the Suplemento Juvenil. O Globo Juvenil was responsible for introducing characters such as Superman, The Phantom, Prince Valiant, Li'l Abner, Alley Oop, and the republication of some titles from Suplemento Juvenil. In 1939, Marinho created a second magazine, called Gibi, originally a pejorative word for "Black boy"; it became so popular that gibi became a generic name for comic magazines in Brazil.

In 1937, a new series called A Garra Cinzenta (The Grey Claw) was published in the newspaper supplement, A Gazetinha (The Little Gazette). Starring a villain protagonist named Dr. Stone, A Garra Cinzenta was created by Francisco Armond and Renato Silva. The series has become known for its mature themes involving mystery, horror and science fiction. It ended in 1939 after 100 one-page chapters, and was later republished in the Franco-Belgian market.

=== First individual titles and newspaper strips (1950-1963) ===
In 1949, inspired by his brother who published Disney comics in Argentina, the Italian Victor Civita moved to Brazil to found a publishing company. In May 1950, he created Editora Primavera, which published a magazine with Italian comics called Raio Vermelho. In July, he renamed the company Editora Abril. The publishing house's first team had six employees, including science fiction writer and radio soap opera scriptwriter Jerônimo Monteiro as editor, and French journalist Micheline Frank, brought from César Civita's company in Argentina, in the jokes section. The Donald Duck comic book (known as O Pato Donald) was launched on July 12, 1950 and the comic soon became the market leader. After its first twenty-one issues, the magazine became weekly; with the emergence of Zé Carioca comic in 1961, it became biweekly, alternating with this one on newsstands every other week. The two publications also began to adopt the same numbering, with Pato Donald receiving the even numbers and Zé Carioca continuing with the odd numbers in the sequence. In 1952, the Mickey Mouse comic book debuted and original stories made by Brazilian artists were made in the following years.

In the late 1950s, the publisher O Cruzeiro stood out by bringing the titles Little Lulu, Tubby and Dennis the Menace to Brazil, quickly becoming popular, which led the publisher to bring new American titles in the following years, starring characters from both Hanna-Barbera and Harvey Comics. In 1960, Ziraldo launched the Pererê comic, published by O Cruzeiro, becoming known for being the first entirely colored children's magazine published in the country. Pererê had appeared a year earlier in the pages of O Cruzeiro magazine in a series of gag cartoons.

In the same period, the young artist Mauricio de Sousa began his career as a police reporter at the newspaper Folha de S.Paulo; he created the characters Bidu & Franjinha (who would later be known in English translations as Franklin and Blu) in 1959 and the following year with the help of other artists he published comics with his characters in the magazines Bidu and Zaz Traz, returning to Folha de S.Paulo in 1961 where he focused on strips with his character Jimmy Five (Cebolinha), as well as other series with different characters like Chuck Billy 'n' Folks, The Cavern Clan, Bubbly the Astronaut, Lionel's Kingdom, Bug-a-Booo and Horacio's World being among the best known.

In 1959, the popular Capitão 7 (Captain Seven) TV show was adapted into a comic series. The comics were more fantastical than the TV show, giving the protagonist superpowers in line with those of US American superheroes. Capitão 7 is considered the earliest Brazilian costumed hero.

In 1963, Deodato Borges self-published the comic As Aventuras do Flama (The Adventures of Flame), based on his successful radio show of the same name. Its run was limited, but incredibly popular. The titular character was inspired by Jerônimo, o Herói do Sertão (Jerome, the Hero of the Sertão), a soap opera radio show. Borges also listed Will Eisner as an inspiration.

=== Military Dictatorship Period (1964-1985) ===
With the emergence of the Military Dictatorship in Brazil, many magazines ended up being cancelled that same year, which resulted in the abrupt cancellation of Pererê after 4 years of publication. Cruzeiro continued publishing comics until it closed its doors in 1975, with many of its titles gradually being moved to other publishers such as Abril, RGE and Vecchi.

In the late 60s, with the commercial success of Monica (Mônica) and Thunder (Jotalhão), Mauricio managed to form a partnership with Abril to publish the Mônica comic book in 1970, which was successful enough that in 1973 the comic book Cebolinha starring the character Jimmy Five debuted. Starting in 1974 there were other attempts to publish original comics by Brazilian artists through the publisher, such as Satanésio by Ruy Perotti, Sacarrolha by Primaggio Mantovi, Cacá e Sua Turma by Ely Barbosa, as well as a return of the character Pererê by Ziraldo, however none of the titles lasted more than a year of publication.

In 1970, Eugenio Colonnese’s X-Man (no affiliation to Marvel Comics’s X-Men) was published. It was the first case of a Brazilian hero appearing in a colored comic book. Colonnese was described sometimes as the “Brazilian Jack Kirby” for his speed and imagination. He was prolific, creating heroes such as Mylar, Superargo, and Pele De Cobra (Snake Skin).

In the following years, in addition to Disney and Mauricio de Sousa comics, Abril published other well-known titles such as Little Lulu, Woody Woodpecker, The Pink Panther, Looney Tunes, The Flintstones, Yogi Bear and comics of heroes from both Marvel and DC Comics. Starting in the late 1970s popular TV shows such as Os Trapalhões and Sítio do Picapau Amarelo were adapted into long running comic books by other publishers such as Bloch and RGE. In 1982, two more characters by Mauricio de Sousa gained their own title, Smudge (Cascão) and Chuck Billy (Chico Bento). In the same year there was a comic book adaptation of the children's TV show Turma do Lambe-Lambe by Abril, whose characters were created by cartoonist Daniel Azulay, who previously worked with newspaper strips between the 60s and 70s.

During the dictatorship, several underground and alternative magazines criticizing the regime emerged, among them O Pasquim, which published satirical comic strips and cartoons by Henfil, Jaguar, Millôr Fernandes and Ziraldo, among others.

There was a trend toward creating imitations of popular US American superheroes, due to Adolfo Aizen’s introduction of many Marvel Comics heroes to Brazilian audiences. For example, the GEP Company published the first issue of Raio Negro (Black Bolt) in 1965, a character who was acknowledged by his creator Gedeone Malagola to be heavily inspired by DC Comics’ Green Lantern. Other examples include Bola de Fogo (Fireball), considered to be a copy of The Human Torch, and Escorpião (Scorpion), considered to be a copy of The Phantom by Lee Falk.

=== Post Military Dictatorship (1985-present) ===
After several years being published by Abril all Monica and Friends comics were discontinued in 1986 and moved the following year to Editora Globo, where the comic book for the character Maggy (Magali) debuted in 1989. With the end of Mauricio de Sousa's comics by Abril in the late 80s, the publisher resorted to new titles such as Fofura, Gordo and Patrícia of Ely Barbosa who had previously published the comic book Cacá e Sua Turma by RGE, in the beginning of the decade, and also O Menino Maluquinho based on Ziraldo's 1980 book of the same name, which ended up becoming a success, being published until 1994 and then continued by other publishers.

In the 2000s, the Abril comics became mainly limited to just Disney over time. Monica and Friends and Menino Maluquinho comics were published by Globo, however after Mauricio moved his characters to the multinational publisher Panini Comics in 2007, Globo discontinued publishing comics in 2008. Abril discontinued publishing comics in 2018, making the new publisher Culturama continue with Disney comics.

=== Celebrity comics ===
In 1977, in a partnership between Mauricio de Sousa and the football player Pelé, a comic book called Pelezinho was released, showing a child version of Pelé with some inspiration from Mauricio's other work, Monica and Friends.

In the 1980s, TV host Gugu Liberato, at the time known for his TV show Viva a Noite, broadcast on the SBT channel, became popular among children starting to have products with his image including a comic book published by Seqüência between 1984 and 1985 entitled Aventuras do Gugu. In 1988, another comic book starring Gugu was published by Abril, which also published the comic book based on Sérgio Mallandro (another SBT host who was also popular among children at that period) in the same year. Both comics were published until 1990, but Mallandro's comic was moved in the same year to Editora Globo when he moved to the TV channel of the same name. With the success of children's host Xuxa on her TV show Xou da Xuxa, a series was also published by Globo from 1988 to 1995. Her rival Angélica also had her own title published by Bloch Editores between 1989 and 1992.

In 1991, comics based on the presenter Faustão and the singers Leandro & Leonardo also had their own comics adapted for children published respectively by Abril and Globo. In 1994, the comic book of the character Senninha was introduced, created by Rogério Martins and Ridaut Dias Jr., based on the racing driver Ayrton Senna, following the same style as the Pelezinho comic book published by Mauricio de Sousa. The comic book debuted a few months before Senna's death, which boosted sales and was published until 1999 with more than 100 issues. However, the character Senninha continued to return occasionally in new special comics and strips in the following years. Between 1998 and 2001 a children's comic book called Aninha (based on the host Ana Maria Braga) was published by Nova Cultural. Also in 1998, the comic book Oscarzinho was released by publisher Mythos, based on the basketball player Oscar Schmidt.

In 2006, Mauricio de Sousa formed a partnership with football player Ronaldinho Gaúcho to launch a new comic book also featuring him as a child similar to the Pelezinho comic book, initially published by Globo and continued by Panini Comics from 2007 to 2015. In 2013, Mauricio repeated the same style with the player Neymar Jr. also publishing the comic book through Panini until 2015.

=== Japanese influences ===
In 1956, Ypê Nakashima, a Japanese immigrant, published in the yonkoma format a comic strip titled Sr. Bra da Colônia in the São Paulo Shimbun, a newspaper restricted to the Japanese colony. Nakashima would later become better known for his work in animation, particularly the animated feature Piconzé (1972). In 1966, the publisher Edrel was founded by Salvador Bentivegna, Jinki Yamamoto and Minami Keizi, but its management occurred some time before, at the end of the 50s, when “grocery stores and warehouses” imported Japanese publications for the descendants of Japanese people. One of the first characters that served as a mascot for the publisher, Tupãzinho, was clearly inspired by Osamu Tezuka's character Astro Boy however, his design was changed to more closely resemble American characters in the style of Harvey Comics because Keizi believed that the manga style would not be popular in Brazil. Other characters inspired by Japanese comics were also published, including Claudio Seto's about samurai and ninja, the publisher closed in 1975.

In the early 1990s, original Brazilian comics based on tokusatsu series such as Juspion, Changeman, Jiraiya and others were published and developed by artists such as Marcelo Cassaro through the Heróis da TV series published by Abril.

In 1998, the Japanese-Brazilian artist Fábio Yabu created the webcomic Combo Rangers, initially as a parody of Japanese heroes, which, due to its success, was published in print by the publishers JBC and Panini. In 1999 Marcelo Cassaro and his team created the comic Holy Avenger with strong inspiration from manga, illustrated by artist Érica Awano based on the RPG Tormenta. Both series have developed a considerable legacy, becoming cult classics with Holy Avenger even being considered the most successful Brazilian manga.

In 2000, the publisher Conrad became a pioneer by launching well-known manga titles in Japan such as Dragon Ball and Saint Seiya, which achieved good sales figures. This led to more manga being sold in Brazil in the following years.

Inspired by the success of manga among teenage audiences, in 2008 Mauricio de Sousa released a retelling of Monica and Friends as a manga-styled comic with its characters as teenagers entitled Turma da Mônica Jovem (later published in English as Monica Adventures), produced by several artists and writers from his studio and initially having strong references to Japanese pop culture, quickly became a top-selling success in its first few years. The comic received a spin-off in 2013 called Chico Bento Moço, starring an older version of Chuck Billy that was published until 2021.

In 2011, a new comic based on Tormenta entitled Ledd, authored by J.M. Trevisan and artist Lobo Borges, which was initially published online, but later gained printed versions. Over the years, several independent authors and artists have tried to develop their own manga, with titles such as Tools Challenge, Digude, Quack, Rei de Lata, Lampião, Oxente, among others. Similarly, attempts to create manga anthology magazines in the style of Weekly Shōnen Jump have occurred over the years, with magazines such as Ação Magazine and Action Hiken.

=== Brazilian artists’ success globally ===
In 1992, Mike Deodato (legally Deodato Taumaturgo Borges Filho) worked as the illustrator for Santa Claws, a oneshot comic published by US company Malibu Comics. Born in 1963 in Campina Grande, Paraíba, Brazil, he had spent his young adulthood working alongside his father Deodato Borges for small comic publishers in Brazil. During this time, he was involved in the creation of 3000 Anos Depois (3000 Years Later), later released in English under the title Fallout 3000.

Throughout the 90s, he rose to prominence in the US comics industry, illustrating for both Marvel Comics and DC Comics. He worked on over 300 individual comics, most notably The Incredible Hulk and The Amazing Spider-Man. In the early 2000s, he slowed his working pace and started working exclusively with Marvel Comics.

== Titles ==
- Combo Rangers
- Geraldão
- Holy Avenger
- O Menino Maluquinho
- Níquel Náusea
- Senninha
- Sítio do Picapau Amarelo
- Turma do Pererê
- Turma da Mônica
