= Chuck Billy (disambiguation) =

Chuck Billy (born 1962) is an American vocalist for the thrash metal band Testament.

Chuck Billy may also refer to:

- Chuck Billy 'n' Folks, a Brazilian comic strip
  - Chuck Billy (Chuck Billy 'n' Folks), the main character

== See also ==
- Billy and Chuck, a professional wrestling tag team of Billy Gunn and Chuck Palumbo
