= Mônica e Cebolinha: No Mundo de Romeu e Julieta =

1979 film directed by José Amâncio

- VHS release poster
- Directed by: José Amâncio
- Written by: Yara Maura
- Based on: Romeo and Juliet, by William Shakespeare; Monica's Gang, by Maurício de Sousa
- Edited by: Beto Mariano
- Music by: Yara Maura; Marcio Araujo de Sousa
- Production company: Maurício de Sousa Produções
- Distributed by: Rede Bandeirantes (TV); Transvídeo (VHS)
- Release date: 1979
- Running time: 43 minutes
- Country: Brazil
- Language: Portuguese

Mônica e Cebolinha: No Mundo de Romeu e Julieta (Portuguese for Monica and Jimmy Five: In the World of Romeo & Juliet) is a film adaptation of Romeo and Juliet by William Shakespeare, starring Monica's Gang. It was originally staged at theater in 1978 with a comic and LP adaptation out in the same year. In 1979 the feature film adaptation of the play was released, filmed in Ouro Preto, as a special for the Children's Day on Rede Bandeirantes. Along with A Rádio do Chico Bento, is one of the two films inspired by Mauricio de Sousa characters completely done in live-action.

== Plot ==
In Verona, Italy, live two rival families, the Montagues and the Capulets. Constant clashes took Prince Sunny to ban fights and duels between them, with the promise to punish those who violate the peace. Angel Benvolio is invited to a masquerade ball at the house of Capulet - Romeu Montague Jimmy Five decides to go there in disguise. Once there, he bumps into Juliet Monicapulet, who falls in love for him. After a meeting at the counter, she decides to marry Romeo - but he is reluctant, only changing his mind after being beaten by Friar Smudge. After a marriage that happens just because the bride was armed with a bunny, Romeo and Friar Smudge rush to play in a marble championship. There, Romeo fights with Chuck Billy Tybalt, Juliet's cousin, and is expelled from the city. Desperate, Juliet asks the Friar to come up with a foolproof plan - and he decides to read Romeo and Juliet. But as the book ends with the two protagonists dead, Juliet Monicapulet does not like this ending and goes behind the Prince Sunny, that decides to forgive Romeo.

== Characters ==
- Jimmy Five - Romeu Montague Jimmy Five (Romeo Montague)
- Monica - Juliet Monicapulet (Juliet Capulet)
- Smudge - Friar Smudge (Friar Laurence)
- Maggy - Ama Gali (Juliet's Nurse)
- Angel - Angel Benvolio (Benvolio Montague)
- Sunny - Prince Sunny of Verona (Prince Escalus)
- Chuck Billy - Chuck Billy Tybalt (Tybalt Capulet)
- Zeke - Zeke Mercutio (Mercutio)
- Cousin Benny - Messenger of Prince Sunny of Verona (Messenger of Prince Escalus)
- Taka - Taka

== Soundtrack ==
Mônica e Cebolinha – No Mundo de Romeu e Julieta

Soundtrack album by Maurício de Sousa and Yara Maura
- Released: 1978
- Label: Editora Abril

Side "A"
No.	Title	Length
1.	"Começa a Peça"
2.	"Sambão de Romeu e Julieta"
3.	"A Valsa do Encontro"
4.	"Tema de Julieta"
5.	"Sou o Lomeu"
6.	"Samba do Fruto Proibido"

Side "B"
No.	Title	Length
1.	"Cena do Balcão"
2.	"Rock do Frei Cascão"
3.	"Acho uma Graça"
4.	"Era uma vez um coelhinho encardido"
5.	"Vou Botar meu pé no Chão"
6.	"Triste Final"
7.	"Uma Explosão de Amor"
