= Tico Tico =

Tico Tico may refer to:

- "Tico-Tico no Fubá", a 1917 Brazilian choro song composed by Zequinha de Abreu
- O Tico-Tico, considered both the first Brazilian children's magazine and the first to publish comics
- Tico-Tico (born 1973), professional name of Mozambican football striker Manuel José Luís Bucuane
