= Chuck Billy and the Marvelous Guava Tree =

2025 Brazilian film

- Portuguese: Chico Bento e a Goiabeira Maraviósa
- Directed by: Fernando Fralha
- Written by: Elena Altheman; Fernando Fraiha; Raul Chequer
- Based on: Chuck Billy 'n' Folks by Mauricio de Sousa
- Produced by: Bianca Villar; Daniel Rezende; Fernando Fraiha; Karen Castanho
- Starring: Isaac Amendoim; Pedro Dantas; Anna Júlia Dias; Lorena de Oliveira; Davi Okabe; Guilherme Tavares; (See more)
- Edited by: Daniel Weber
- Music by: Fabio Góes
- Production companies: Paris Entretenimento; Paramount Pictures; Biônica Filmes; Mauricio de Sousa Produções
- Distributed by: Paris Filmes
- Release date: 9 January 2025
- Running time: 90 minutes
- Country: Brazil
- Language: Portuguese
- Box office: R$17,055,663 (US$3164315.96)

Chuck Billy and the Marvelous Guava Tree (Portuguese: Chico Bento e a Goiabeira Maraviósa) is a 2025 Brazilian adventure comedy film directed by Fernando Fraiha, who co-wrote the screenplay alongside Elena Altheman and Raul Chequer, based on the comic book series created by Mauricio de Sousa. It is the first live-action film featuring the character Chuck Billy. Produced by Biônica Filmes in co-production with Mauricio de Sousa Produções and Paris Entretenimento. It premiered in Brazilian theaters on January 9, 2025.

Starring Isaac Amendoim, the story follows Chuck Billy on an adventure with his friends to save Mr. Jed's guava tree. The film also features Pedro Dantas, Anna Julia Dias, Lorena de Oliveira, Augusto Madeira, Luis Lobianco, and Débora Falabella in major roles.
