= Tormenta (disambiguation) =

Tormenta is Brazilian role-playing game.

Tormenta or La Tormenta may also refer to:

- Tormenta FC, an American soccer team
- Tormenta: Rampaging Run, an upcoming dive coaster at Six Flags Over Texas
- Tormenta (film), a 1956 British drama film
- Tormenta (singer), an Argentine singer
- "Tormenta", a song by Gorillaz featuring Bad Bunny from Cracker Island
- La Tormenta, a 2005 Colombian telenovela
- La tormenta (1967 TV series), a Mexican telenovela
- La Tormenta (EP), an extended play by Christina Aguilera
