= Chico Bento – Pavor Espaciar =

Brazilian graphic novel

Chico Bento - Pavor Espaciar

Publication information
- Publisher: Panini Comics
- Genre: Adventure
- Publication date: August, 2013
- Main character(s): Chuck Billy 'n' Folks

Creative team
- Written by: Gustavo Duarte
- Artist(s): Gustavo Duarte

Chico Bento – Pavor Espaciar (Chuck Billy - Space Dread) is a 2013 Brazilian graphic novel written and illustrated by Gustavo Duarte based on the Chuck Billy 'n' Folks characters created by Maurício de Sousa. It is part of the Graphic MSP series of graphic novels based on Maurício de Sousa characters.

== Synopsis ==
It could be just another quiet night in Zucchini's Village. But Chuck Billy, his cousin Zeke, Pork Chop and chicken Ma Megg were strangely abducted by aliens who have sinister plans.
