= Angelo Agostini =

Italian-born Brazilian Illustrator and journalist (1843–1910)

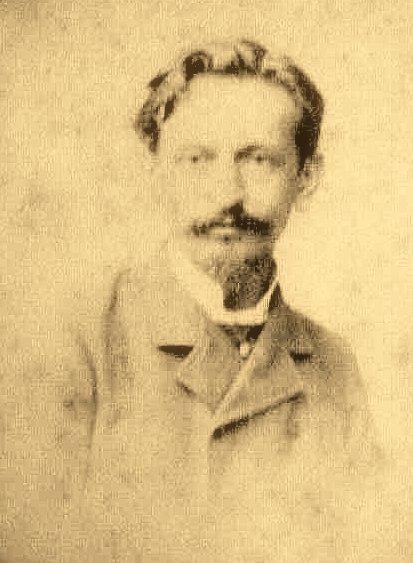
- Born: 8 April 1843 Vercelli, Italy
- Died: 23 January 1910 (aged 66) Rio de Janeiro, Brazil
- Areas: Cartoonist, Writer, Artist

Angelo Agostini (8 April 1843 – 23 January 1910) was an Italian-born Brazilian illustrator, journalist and founder of several publications, and although born in Italy, is considered the first Brazilian cartoonist.

== Biography ==
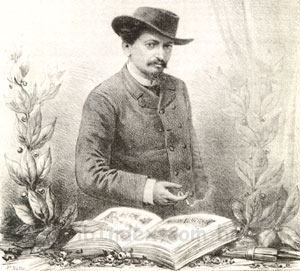
Agostini self-portrait

Agostini was born in Vercelli, Italy, but following adolescence and art studies in Paris, he arrived in Brazil in 1859 with his mother the singer Raquel Agostini, and settled.

At an early age, he published drawn work in the São Paulo publication Diabo Coxo on 17 September 1864. Following more work published in Cabrião and Revista Arlequim, Agostini produced a sequential image story serialised in Vida Fluminense titled As Aventuras de Nhô Quim (The Adventures of Nhô Quim). The first chapter published on 30 January 1869, the story involved themes of conflict between the agricultural and urban culture, and political commentary through visual storytelling capable of reaching a largely illiterate population.

During the 1880s Agostini started the periodical Revista Illustrada, which became noted for its illustrated coverage of the annual Carnival. On 27 January 1883, the first chapter of As Aventuras do Zé Caipora (The Adventures of Zé Caipora) was published, starting a successful publication run of 35 episodes spread out over many years,. Achieving a multimedia impact, the series was printed in four editions, and inspired a popular song and two silent films.

Agostini established the magazine Don Quixote in 1895, which lasted until 1906, and with Luiz Bartolomeu de Sousa e Silva founded the influential youth magazine O Tico-Tico for publisher O Malho in 1905. During his final years he worked for the magazine O Malho, until his death in 1910.

== Personal life ==
Agostini was married and he and the painter Abigail de Andrade's relationship caused a scandal in Rio de Janeiro society. The couple left Brazil in 1888 for Paris, with their daughter Angelina Agostini (1888-1973), who also became a sculptor and painter. Andrade had a second son with Agostini, Angelo, who died of tuberculosis after birth. She died a year later of the same illness.

== Legacy ==
Named in honour of Agostini, the Prêmio Angelo Agostini is a Brazilian comics prize awarded by Associação dos Quadrinhistas e Caricaturistas do Estado de São Paulo since 1985.

== Bibliography ==
- As Aventuras de Nhô Quim (1869)
- As Aventuras do Zé Caipora (1883)
- História de Pai João (1906)
- A Arte de Formar Brasileiros (1906)
