= Combo Rangers =

1998 webcomic series by Fábio Yabu

- The five main Rangers in their Revolution era. From left to right: Lisa, Ken, Fox, Kiko and Tati.
- Author: Fábio Yabu
- Launch date: 1998 (webcomic); 2000 (printed comic); 2013 (graphic novel)
- End date: 2001 (webcomic); 2004 (printed comic); 2017 (graphic novel)
- Publisher(s): Editora JBC; Panini Comics
- Genre(s): parody, super sentai

Combo Rangers is a series of comics created in 1998 by Japanese-Brazilian author Fábio Yabu. The series debuted as a webcomic, but eventually received a print version published by JBC and Panini Comics.

The series is inspired by superheroes from pop culture, initially taking inspiration from Japanese tokusatsu heroes such as Super Sentai and its American version Power Rangers, initially starting as a comedy webcomic focused on parodies, but which developed over time with more serious narratives while still maintaining some of its original comedy proposal.

The series shows the adventures of a group of children who are summoned by the retired superhero Mighty Combo to become a squad of superheroes willing to defend their city from various villains.

The comic was canceled in 2004 for financial reasons, but maintained its legacy by returning as a trilogy of Graphic Novels between 2013 and 2017. Combo Rangers has won the HQ Mix Award three times.

== Synopsis ==
=== Original Series ===
The story is set in a fictional city called Cidade City ("City City") which is located in a fictional universe called "Yabuverso" ("Yabuverse"). This universe's Earth is depicted as having several superheroes and villains inspired by both American and Japanese media. The webcomic had three sagas (the first one, Zero and Revolution) and was continued by the print version by publishers JBC and Panini.

The plot starts when the retired superhero Poderoso Combo recruits a group of five kids (Fox, Tati, Lisa, Ken and Kiko), all about nine years old, to turn into the Combo Rangers to protect their city from an alien invasion by the Deskarga Empire led by General Monte. In the course of the story they meet a sixth ranger named Luke who came from the future to save Lisa from a greater threat. The first part of the story ends with the heroes sacrificing themselves in the final battle, but being resurrected with their memories as Combo Rangers erased.

In Combo Rangers Zero, a mysterious villain called Grande Mestre ("Grandmaster") appears using his henchmen Dr. Delírio and the young girl Fabi to spread terror in Cidade City, Combo decides to ask for help from the kids again (now older) to become Combo Rangers again, having their memories restored and gaining evolved forms. In the course of the saga they meet Maya, find Luke again, lose their powers, but get new powers with new forms at the end with the help of an alien wizard. The saga ends with Grande Mestre revealing himself as an evil clone of Combo and Delírio being Maya's lost father, Dr. Cooper.

In Combo Rangers Revolution after the defeat of Grande Mestre a new alien villain called Cardman appears wanting to dominate Earth with his henchman Deck. The saga ends with an incomplete end-of-the-world arc.

The JBC series followed with stories without continuity. The Panini series showed changes with more focus on other superheroes helping the protagonists with Fox gaining new powers (which are stolen by a villain in one of the arcs) and Tati leaving the group in the end being replaced by Sarah as the pink ranger.

=== Graphic Novels ===
Set in a fictional city known as Cidade Nova (New City), in the past, the world had several superheroes, but since a phenomenon began that made most humans gain powers, superheroes ended up becoming irrelevant, leading many of them to retire. However, when an alien dictator known as Satan Boss of the Domao empire appears, willing to dominate the Earth with his servants Deck and Giluke, Mighty Combo, along with his partners Peacemaker and Mirrorman, find themselves forced to recruit a group of 5 determined kids who end up inheriting Combo's powers to fight through bracelets.

After being chosen, Fox, Tati, Lisa, Ken and Kiko initially end up facing problems with the headmaster of their school Principal Pile and also Fox's father who are strict and want to prevent them from using their powers, however, after proving their courage by facing Deck and Giluke with their powers, they end up gaining everyone's support, making the superheroes resurface.

Giluke turns out to have visions about the original universe and wants to approach Lisa to whom he demonstrates a platonic love and tries to pretend to be a new student called Luke while making Mirrorman allying with Satan Boss by making him turn his evil version. Later Pile apparently sacrifices himself by fighting one of the villains which ends up making the Combo Rangers rethink to give up being heroes as part of a plan so that they can take their bracelets.

However, Deck decides to betray Satan Boss by stealing the power of bracelets as a form of revenge, but ends up dying for not being able to contain all the power. Giluke returns to Satan Boss who also takes Pile (who had previously been saved by Giluke) to be his new servant making him brainwashing to be General Pile. After that Fox's father becomes the new headmaster of their school, Lisa begins to have visions of Luke from the original universe and managing to communicate with Mirrorman she creates a plan to rescue Giluke.

After a long fight and finally rescue Giluke as the last member of the team, the Combo Rangers wage the final battle against Satan Boss through a giant robot built by Ken killing the villain by throwing him in the sun. In the end Giluke is adopted by Pile and Mirrorman that reveal to have become a gay couple in the meantime serving Satan Boss and part to space to end the rest of their empire.

== Characters ==
=== Heroes ===
- Fox Fonseca, the Red Combo Ranger and leader of the team. He is portrayed as an immature, airheaded, lazy boy who hates studying, most often serving as the main comic relief; still, he is responsible enough to lead the team and has a great sense of justice. He starts dating Tati in Combo Rangers Zero.
- Tatiana "Tati" Rosa, the Pink Combo Ranger. In the first saga she was presented as a girl with a calm personality, but her personality quickly changed during the plot being portrayed as an extroverted and obsessive girl who had a platonic love for Fox to the point of constantly wanting to get his attention without success. In Combo Rangers Zero she starts dating Fox, with her relationship with him serving as comic relief in the face of an abrupt change in Tati's personality, beginning to show aggressive and envious behavior to the point of attacking Fox when she sees him around other girls, especially Maya. In the printed series, she matures in behavior and leaves the team in the last issues leaving the groupe leaving Sara to take her place as the Pink Combo Ranger.
- Lisa Lima, the Yellow Combo Ranger. Tends to be the most innocent and naive of the team. At first she was portrayed in the first saga as a poor girl who constantly struggled to try to study and have a better life with her parents, still in this saga she showed prominence by developing special powers and also a close relationship with Luke who becomes her boyfriend in the following sagas. She is usually seen having Tati as her best friend who usually tries to give her advice on how to behave. Her early design was based on Fuu Hououji from Magic Knight Rayearth. In the original Lisa series had a father and mother, but in the reboot they were replaced by a gay couple.
- Kenji "Ken" Ozora, the Blue Combo Ranger. A Japanese-Brazilian boy, he is sometimes seen as the group's second leader after Fox. Unlike Fox, he is more serious and focused on missions, in addition to being one of the smartest along with Lisa. His parents are divorced, his father is busy and he rarely sees his mother.
- Frederico "Kiko" Freitas, the Green Combo Ranger. An Afro-Brazilian boy, he has a calm personality and sometimes speaks with slang, in addition to having a passion for music. Among the characters, he is the one who is most seen changing his haircut between each saga.
- Luke, the White Combo Ranger. He was introduced during the plot of the first saga as a mysterious hero who often appeared to save Lisa. Over the time it was revealed that he was a time traveler from the future who came to save the Combo Rangers from a terrible fate and at the end of the saga he disappears after fulfilling his mission. In season Zero, his present-day counterpart returns, being dead at first and having his body used by the villains to become the Black Combo Ranger to eliminate the protagonists, but he is later revived and has since become a permanent member of the team as the White Combo Ranger again. In the reboot he is introduced as one of the villain Satan Boss' servants alongside Deck, initially introduced under the name Giluke, at first acting as one of the villains, he quickly redeems himself throughout the story by visions of the original universe, becoming a Combo Ranger at the end of the third graphic novel and being adopted by Pile and Mirroman after the defeat of Satan Boss.
- Maya Cooper, a young genius girl who is one of the main allies of the team. She was introduced in the first saga as a girl from the future who was responsible for training Luke and sending him to the past to save the Combo Rangers. In Combo Rangers Zero her present-day counterpart gains a major spotlight as one of the main protagonists, after meeting and helping the team against Grande Mestre and Dr. Delírio while she was in the search of her father Dr. Cooper. Her design in the first season was based on Hikaru Shidou from Magic Knight Rayearth. The character was omitted from the reboot.
- Mighty Combo (Poderoso Combo), the mentor of the Combo Rangers often referred to as Tio Combo ("Uncle Combo") by his students and other characters. He was originally introduced as a hero from a virtual world who communicated with the protagonists and summoned them to his base through Ken's television, but over time he was rewritten as a retired superhero of alien origin. He is characterized by his short stature, always wearing a mask and his immense lack of luck. He had retired in the past after an event in one of his fights that made him choose to no longer use his powers for health reasons. Alongside Fox, he is often portrayed as the main comic relief due to his immense lack of luck during his long life. He is a longtime member of a league of superheroes known as ASH (Associação dos Super-Heróis, lit.: "Superheroes Association"). His mask design is a reference to Ted Kord (Blue Beetle). In the reboot it is shown that the Combo Rangers' powers are linked to him and in this version the Combo Rangers can access them through bracelets and can lose them if Combo dies.

=== Villains ===
- General Pile (General Monte), the main villain of the first saga of Combo Rangers. A poo-like alien that is the immature leader of an army of aliens who is on a mission to dominate the Earth for the Empire Deskarga, whose members are based in toilet things (Deskarga is a pun with descarga, "flush" in Portuguese). Among his main partners are Pum and Carolho, in addition to often wanting to please his wife who resembles a feminine version of himself. His full name is Agamenon Monte Pereira. At the end of the saga his empire is destroyed by the Supernova Crystal Warriors and his fate becomes unknown. In the reboot, a human character based on him called Principal Pile appears, being the headmaster of the school where the protagonists study, behaving like a military general. He acts as an antagonist mainly against Fox wanting to prevent his students from using powers and follow career as heroes, but over time he becomes tolerate Fox and his friends' actions due to the attacks of the Empire of Satan Boss, being even forced to be a servant for him as General Pile at one point and revelaing being gay at the end marrying with Mirrorman.
- Pum, a secondary antagonist during the first saga and Zero. An E.T.-like flatulent alien creature who communicates only by speaking his own name and has the ability to making the monsters giant through his gases (Pum by the way means "fart" in Portuguese) in a way similar to Gyodai from Changeman. He was introduced as General Pile's main partner in the first saga, but abandoned him after his defeat at the end of the saga. In Combo Rangers Zero he returns to serve the Grande Mestre, playing the same role as in the previous saga and serving as Fabi's partner in crime and also her best friend. Like Fabi, he redeems himself at the end of the saga and follows her after that, only returning in the Panini series where he reveals that he has achieved the ability to change shape.
- Carolho, a secondary antagonist during the first saga and a recurring villain in the following sagas. A round gray alien with lots of eyes that has the ability to reproduce small gray humanoid monsters called the Homens de Quatro Olhos ("Four-Eyed Men") who serve as minion monsters against the Combo Rangers. He was introduced as one of the main servants of General Pile along with Pum, being responsible for sending the monsters against the Combo Rangers. He remained the same until he accidentally merged with a gorilla monster in one of the stories, becoming the Macacacarolho who was killed, but later revived by Pile. Still in the first saga he received two evolutions by Pile: Cyber Macacarolho (being a cyborg version) and Macacaloiro (having blonde hair in reference to Dr. Gori from Spectreman). He returns in Combo Rangers Zero being evolved by Fabi becoming the Super Macacaloiro (as a reference to the Super Saiyans from Dragon Ball Z), remaining in this form ever since.
- Homens de Quatro Olhos, an army of minion monsters that are asexually born by Carolho to serve as soldiers for General Pile against the Combo Rangers. They have the appearance of gray humanoid beings whose faces consist of only 3 eyes (a joke involving them is that although their names mean Four-Eyed Men, their fourth eye is not visible). They were recurring enemies in the first arc being replaced by other monsters with similar roles led by the other villains. They had a brief return in one of the printed comics where it is revealed that Carolho (now as Super Macacaloiro) became capable of generating a new armada with blond hair. In the graphic novels they return serving Satan Boss showing no connection with Carolho.
- Grande Mestre, the main villain in Combo Rangers Zero. At first he is portrayed as a hidden and mysterious villain who gave orders to Delírio and Fabi to attack humans and steal their energy. At the end of the saga he reveals himself as an evil twin of Tio Combo who had arisen because of his negative feelings when he felt concern for his students being in danger during the first saga. He wanted to restore his powers so he could use them for world domination, but he was defeated in the end with Maya's help by convincing Tio Combo to forget his negative feelings. During his final appearance he was abruptly renamed Proteus.
- Dr. Delírio, one of the main antagonists in Combo Rangers Zero. Originally having been Dr. Paul Cooper (Maya's father), he moved to Cidade City where he ended up separating from his daughter and on the way he ended up adopting the young Fabi. He was eventually transformed into the villainous mad scientist Dr. Delírio by becoming the Grande Mestre's servant, being responsible for sending monsters and setting up other plans against the Combo Rangers. At the end of the saga he returns to his original self and reunites with Maya becoming a recurring ally in the following sagas.
- Fabi, adopted daughter of Dr. Cooper/Delírio is one of the main antagonists in Combo Rangers Zero. Originally an orphaned girl, she was adopted by Cooper when he arrived in Cidade City, just before they started serving the Grande Mestre. As a villain, she played the role of commanding the monsters against the Combo Rangers and occasionally expanding their powers, in addition to frequently being assisted by Pum, who over time became her best friend. She also demonstrates a great rivalry with Maya. Like Pum, she redeems herself at the end of the saga and leaves the city with his friend, only returning in the Panini series where he develops a relationship with Ken.
- Cardman, the main villain in Combo Rangers Revolution. Just like General Pile, he's an alien dictator that wants to conquer the Earth in order to take advantage of the natural resources. He is aided by the young boy Deck and his army of card monsters. At the end of the saga he leaves Earth during the end of the world arc and his fate is unknown.
- Deck, a secondary antagonist in Combo Rangers Revolution. A young alien human boy originally hailing from the devastated planet Oreo that serves Cardman as his main ally, acting very similar to Fabi. He is arrogant and demonstrates rivalry with Luke. Like Cardman, his fate after the saga is unknown. In the reboot he is introduced as one of the villain Satan Boss' servants alongside Giluke (Luke), being an old friend of his who were serving Satan Boss in the hope of getting a fairer universe, but over time he reveals himself against his boss stealing the powers of the Combo Rangers which results in his death in the second volume.
- Marvin Maluco and Denis Demente, a duo of two young criminal brothers who are rivals in crime. Maluco Marvin was originally introduced as a filler antagonist in one of the Combo Rangers Revolution stories as an old enemy of Tio Combo during his youth as a superhero. In the printed issues it is revealed that the original Marvin trained an orphan boy to be his successor as a villain becoming the new Marvin Maluco, ignoring his brother who in an act of rebellion became the villain Denis Demente to rival them.
- Satan Boss, the main villain of the graphic novel trilogy. He demonstrates a role similar to that of General Pile and Cardman, also being an alien dictator who aims to dominate the Earth by sending alien monsters against the heroes, and like Cardman he is also Deck's boss at the same time as Luke, who initially introduces himself as Giluke. He was responsible for dominating several planets and transforming several of their inhabitants into his minion servants. He is a giant black alien and his name is a reference to Satan Goth from the MegaBeast Investigator Juspion, which in the Brazilian dub is known as Satan Goss. The character is killed by the Combo Rangers at the end of the third volume and sent to the Sun before even reaching his most powerful form.

=== Other characters ===
- The Teachers, throughout the series the Combo Rangers were seen having two teachers. The first was introduced in the first saga until in a certain issue she is possessed by a vampire and transformed into a monster who is killed by Tati. She is later replaced by her twin sister who has remained in the series ever since. A recurring joke in the series is that Fox does not have a good relationship with them, due to his dislike for studying and being a terrible student. In the reboot the teacher had her role limited to only two cameos for having her role replaced by Pile.
- Santa Claus, the Christmas figure who was an ally of the Combo Rangers during the first arc. He was introduced in a Christmas story where he was accidentally run over by Fox, from then on becoming unconscious, being in a constant state of dizziness and going to live with Combo as his butler while waiting for him to return to normal. The character served as one of the main comic reliefs in the first season of the webcomic, only returning to normal at the end of the same season. After that, the character's last appearance was in a single Combo Rangers Zero story.
- Yabu/Spectroseven, a recurring superhero who is one of the main allies of the Combo Rangers. At first he appeared as a joke character being a self-insert by Fábio Yabu, however, he later revealed himself to be a superhero of alien origin and an old partner of Tio Combo, originating from a planet known as Yabusei where all the inhabitants have the same physical appearance. His superhero alter ego, Spectroseven, is a parody of the Kyodai heroes Ultraman and Spectreman while his origin story of how he came to Earth is a reference to Superman.
- Garota Arco-Íris (lit. Rainbow Girl), a nature-related superheroine who is known for having her identity adopted by several girls chosen by the goddess Gaia. Notably, one of them even served as Tio Combo's love interest in the past and became the current school teacher of the Combo Rangers. Every time a girl turns 18 she loses her powers and memories as a superhero due to a curse imposed by the villain Gótica, who is Gaia's archrival. The current girl to possess the identity, Camila, becomes a frequent ally of the protagonists, allying with them in the Panini issues.
- Mirrorman (Homem-Reflexo, lit. Reflection Man), a recurring superhero ally of the Combo Rangers. Being one of Tio Combo's old allies, he was introduced at the end of the Revolution saga. He is characterized by his head being a hand mirror and have the ability to turn everything into its opposite. His main weakness is that he cannot look at his own reflection, otherwise he becomes a villain until he looks at his reflection again. He had more prominence in the issues published by Panini, helping Combo train his students while at the same time being manipulated by the villain Chefão, but at the end of the saga he gets an end in his duality by adopting the identity of Homem-Equilíbrio. He also has a daughter who just like him also has a hand mirror head. In the reboot he is introduced as one of the retired superhero friends of Combo, he is manipulated by Satan Boss in the last two volumes being stuck in his evil version permanently, but redeems himself over time and in the end becomes Pile's husband, also being rewritten being gay.
- Peacemaker (lit. Pacificador), an aggressive, serious and arrogant Deadpool-like hero specializing in weapons and an ally of the Combo Rangers. Like Mirrorman he was also introduced abruptly at the end of the Revolution saga and just like Mirrorman he later began to interact more actively with the protagonists in the Panini issues helping Combo train his students, most notably becoming Ken's tutor. In the reboot he is introduced as one of the retired superhero friends of Combo who had trained Ken before giving him the Blue Ranger bracelet, he remained with his aggressive personality until the second volume where his personality changed by Mirrorman to a sensitive and effeminate guy.
- Sara Luana Moon, a girl who was introduced in the final issues of Panini Comics. She is a girl who has the ability to possess whatever power she wants every 15 minutes who appeared as one of the new allies for the Combo Rangers in the final battle against the villain Chefão. After that, she became the Pink Combo Ranger after Tati decided to give up her position as a heroine, even being chosen as the new Garota Arco-Íris in the final issue, but giving up her powers and returning them to Camila. In the reboot, she is introduced as a close friend of Fox at school who made Tati jealous and had been chosen to become the Pink Ranger, but Tati ends up taking the bracelet in her place, however she does not return in later volumes.
- Melissa Melon, a TV hostess who usually appears hosting a TV news covering events in Cidade City. She notably has anime-style green eyes as opposed to the black bead eyes of the other characters. She was introduced during the printed issues, but returns in the reboot.
- Formado Fonseca, is Fox's father. In the original series he was a very minor character with rare appearances usually being only mentioned by Fox being a successful and hardworking man. In the reboot, his role was elevated to one of the main characters, having been a childhood friend of Pile and possessing the power to fly, at first acting as an antagonist to Fox believing that superhero career would not give him a good future, but he supports his son and then becomes the director of the school replacing Pile.

== Development ==
The series premiered in 1998 through its own website that was under the domain of the company UOL. The series was initially created as a joke by Fábio Yabu when he was 17 years old starting as a comedy webcomic produced by Macromedia Flash, however, as it became more popular, Yabu began to take his project more seriously, creating more complex stories and gradually hiring artists to assist in their work. Between October and December 2000, the third season entitled Combo Rangers Revolution was released, with its first 3 chapters released in printed form in a miniseries by the publisher JBC at the same time that the plot of the miniseries was presented in animated form by the website with professional voice actors such as Fábio Lucindo and Fátima Noya.

After the inconclusive end of the webcomic, in August 2001 the comics began to be sold in print definitively by JBC, where it remained in publication for a whole year lasting 12 issues. In January 2003 the series was moved to another publisher, Panini Comics, which published the comics until it was canceled after 10 issues, according to Fábio Yabu for financial reasons as he was no longer able to pay the artists due to inflation of the currency at the time. In 2004, Yabu decided to stop writing the comic, in order to focus solely on his book "Princesas do Mar" (Sea Princesses). After a while, the website returned, reposting the first two seasons of the webcomic, but stopped receiving updates in 2005.

In December 2012, Yabu ran a crowdfunding project on the website Catarse.me to release a new Combo Rangers story as a graphic novel. The funding was successful and the book was released in Brazil in 2013. It was followed by two sequel books, the latter of which had a crowdfunding campaign launched for it in 2017.

== Reception and legacy ==
The Combo Rangers series was very well received during its original publication having had a fan club with more than 20 thousand subscribers, and continued to be referenced as Fábio Yabu's main work even after its cancellation. The series are often referenced among the main Brazilian comics ever published, often highlighting the fact that the series was one of the pioneering webcomics to gain printed versions. The characters are also often referenced among the main superheroes created in Brazil. A line of dolls with the 6 protagonists was sold in 2003 by the manufacturer Multibrink.

The characters were referenced in the animated series based on Yabu's book series Sea Princesses, that aired between 2007 and 2010, having appeared as background characters being teenagers on the beach in many episodes of the first season and as main characters being children in one of the season 2 episodes. In 2014, in a collaboration with Level UP, character skins from their graphic novel designs were temporarily inserted into the game Elsword, having available the 5 original protagonists together of Maya, Deck and Garota Arco-Íris. The first issue of the original JBC miniseries published in 2000 was reprinted in 2025.
