= Sea Princesses =

2004 book series and 2007 animated-series

- Princesas do Mar (2004); Uma Sombra na Água (2006); As Cartas de Vento (2007); A Balada da Princesa Esquecida (2009)
- Author: Fábio Yabu
- Cover artist: Fábio Yabu
- Country: Brazil
- Language: Portuguese
- Genre: Children's fiction; Fantasy
- Publisher: Panda Books
- Published: 2004 – 2010
- Media type: Print (hardback and paperback); E-book
- No. of books: 4

Sea Princesses (known as Princesas do Mar in Brazil) is a series of children's books created by the Brazilian writer and cartoonist Fábio Yabu. The series focuses on an underwater world where each species of marine animal is ruled by royal families composed of a human-like race known as the Salinos, who live hidden from surface humans, with the stories centered on the children of these royal families.

The first book was released in 2004 by publisher Panda Books, and due to its initial success, was expanded into a media franchise in the following years with new books being made as well as products that included toys and magazines. The books later spawned an animated series in 2007 that was co-produced by Neptuno Films from Spain and Southern Star Entertainment from Australia, which lasted 2 seasons, ending in 2010.

== Plot ==
The series is set in a place deep under the sea known as the World of Salacia, a hidden kingdom founded by a goddess named Salacia, home to a race known as the Salinos who lived in harmony with the sea creatures. However, when the sea creatures began to feel threatened, Salacia chose different families to rule over each sea creature, with their own kingdoms and palaces. At the same time, Salacia created a series of laws for the Salinos to follow, the most important of which was to avoid contact with humans from the surface of the Earth, referred to by them as Drylanders, to avoid major conflicts.

The series' main protagonists are the princess trio Polvina, Tubarina, and Ester, three elementary school girls who study at the Sea School under the tutelage of their teacher, Marcia. The trio, along with other princes and princesses, frequently learn new things about the oceans and animals while experiencing adventures, often trying to help sea creatures when they are in danger.

== Concept and Production ==
After the Combo Rangers comic book was canceled in 2004 due to lack of funds to pay the artists, Fábio Yabu decided to create a new series aimed at a completely different audience than his previous series, targeting young girls. According to Yabu, he had never liked the beach and the sea, but that changed when he made a drawing of a girl with octopus-shaped hair who became Polvina. The initial plan was to make an animated series, but due to the difficulty of creating animation in Brazil in the 2000s, he opted for a picture book. A website for the series hosted under the domain of the company UOL (which was previously also responsible for the Combo Rangers website) was launched over time. With the popularity of the first book, Yabu expanded the series further, writing more books over the years and making some products while the series got its animated adaptation in 2007. The franchise was discontinued in 2010, with the final book released that year. The website was last updated in 2012 until it was deactivated in 2014, probably due to the fact that Fábio Yabu returned to betting on the Combo Rangers graphic novel trilogy during this period.

== Characters ==
=== Main characters ===
- Polvina (Pulpita in European Spanish and Pulpina in Latin American Spanish) – She is the Princess of the Octopuses. She usually tends to be the leader of the trio, being a calm and friendly girl who likes to read, but who doesn't hesitate to risk herself to help her friends. In the books her hair and clothes are red (just like her parents), but in the animation they were changed to pink. She is voiced by Isabella Dunwill.
- Esther (Estér in Latin American Spanish and Portuguese and Estrella in European Spanish) – She is the yellow Princess of the Starfish, and best friend of Polvina and Tubarina. She's been Polvina and Tubarina's best friend since they were babies and always accompanies them on their adventures. She usually tends to be the most mischievous and immature of the trio. She is voiced by Katherine Cohn Beck.
- Tubarina (Tiburina in European and Latin American Spanish) – She is the blue Princess of the Sharks, and daughter of one of the most powerful men in Salacia, the King Shark. She is also Vito’s baby sister. Tubarina tends to be the most temperamental and bad tempered of the trio, sometimes very bossy and arrogant, but she often learns from her mistakes. She's almost always with her best friends Polvina and Esther, and she's also Marcello's cousin, with whom she doesn't get along very well. She is voiced by Paige Walker.

=== Other Princesses and Princes ===
- Marcello (Marcelo in Portuguese and European and Latin American Spanish) – He is the Prince of Hammerhead Sharks, and cousin to Tubarina. He began living at the Shark Palace after the episode because his parents were away, and has since become a frequent character in the series. He usually doesn't get along very well with Tubarina and her friends and often acts as an antagonist against the girls, accompanied by his best friend Hugo. However, he sometimes shows that he can be a good boy and help the girls, including his cousin. The character was originally from the cartoon, but was later incorporated into the books.
- Bia (Bea in Latin American Spanish) – She is the Princess of the Abyssal Kingdom, responsible for maintaining order in Beyondness sea and take care of the throne while her parents are travel throughout the kingdom. She met Polvina and her friends in one of the first episodes of the series, becoming friends with them ever since, and frequently appearing in episodes related to the Abyssal Kingdom. Because she lives in the darkness, she is very sensitive to light and usually only leaves the kingdom at night. She is voiced by Roslyn Oades.
- Hugo – The Prince of Sea Turtles, heir to the throne with his twin sister, Tata. He usually appears as Marcello's best friend, often accompanying him, although he appears to be much more shy and naive than him. He dresses in a similar way to a cyclist wearing a turtle shell shaped bicycle helmet as his crown. Despite being Tata's twin brother, he is never seen interacting with her or even the turtles. The character was original to the cartoon.
- Marley (Marli in Portuguese and European and Latin American Spanish) – She is the Princess of Swordfish. She is usually portrayed as an arrogant and competitive girl who easily picks on other girls, sometimes having been portrayed as Esther's rival in the animation, but deep down she is a good girl. In the books she is basically the opposite being a shy, quiet girl. Her crown is a cheerful swordfish hooked in her hair.
- Leia - The princess of the Whales. Among the princesses, she is the one who is seen most concerned about protecting the animals in her kingdom, constantly trying to stop the Drylanders from harming the whales and often asking her friends for help. She has a baby brother named Lelo. Her crown has the appearance of an orca.
- Tata - Hugo's twin sister and princess of the Sea Turtles. Similar to Leia, she cares deeply about protecting the turtles from danger and the Drylanders, often even asking her friends for help. Her crown is a helmet shaped like a sea turtle with yellow limbs.
- Isa – The Princess of the Penguins. She and her parents live on the surface of the South Pole, she likes to play with penguins and also shows resistance to the cold. Her crown has the appearance of a sleepy penguin with a Santa Claus hat.
- Sirilo (Cirilo in Latin American Spanish) - The prince of the Crabs. Like Hugo, he tends to be a calm, polite, and naive boy. He sometimes appears interacting with Marcello and Hugo when they want to form a trio.
- Eletropaula "Elektra" - The princess of the Electric Eels. An old friend of Polvina, Esther and Tubarina, was introduced in the cartoon returning to Salacia with her family after many years away from the kingdom. Because she is the princess of the electric eels, she is able to resist electricity.
- Vivi - The princess of the Jellyfish. She has dark skin and pink clothes. In one of the episodes of the cartoon she is portrayed as a girl who likes to play pranks on others.
- Delfi - The princess of the Dolphins. Similar to Leia and Tata, she is also very close to the animals in her kingdom, always trying to help the dolphins from the Drylanders, but also playing with them.
- Julie and Jessie (Juli and Mari) - The twin princesses of the Clown Fish. They are notably always seen doing everything together and are always getting along without ever fighting with each other. Julie wear orange clothes while Jessie wear black clothes.
- Angelica - The princess of the Angelfish. She is the most naive and distracted of the princesses, losing concentration very easily, which makes her not very good at studying.
- Matilda - The princess of the Hawkfish.
- Dinho - The prince of the Blowfish. He has only appeared in the books.
- Mauricio - The prince of the Sea Urchins.
- Goldina - The princess of the Goldfish. She has only appeared in the books.
- Agostina - The princess of the Lobsters. She was never heard speaking.
- Socita - The princess of the Grouper Fish.
- Caton (Saulo in Portuguese and Carlos in Latin American Spanish) - The prince of the Salmon. He's one of Marcello's friends and is very mean to Esther on insulting her.
- Marcela - Marcello's sister and princess of the Hammerhead Sharks. She has only appeared in the books.
- Soraya - The princess of the Stingray.
- Janue - The princess of the Blue Lyretail.
- Vito (Beto in European Spanish) - Tubarina's older brother and prince of the Sharks.
- Camerelo (Caramelo in Latin American Spanish) - The prince of the Sea Snails.
- Lia (Pía in Latin American Spanish) - The princess of the Lionfish.
- Camarina - The princess of the Shrimp.
- Duante - A traveler who helps sick fish in need.

=== Animals ===
- Tavinho (Bracitos in Latin American Spanish) - Polvina's pet purple octopus. In one of the episodes of the show it is revealed that he was a gift from the Octopus Queen to Polvina, having found him near the beach.
- Telo (Spikey in English and European Spanish and Puntitas in Latin American Spanish) - Esther's pet yellow starfish.
- Dentinho (Gummy in English and European Spanish and Dentín in Latin American Spanish) - Tubarina's pet blue baby shark.

=== Others ===
- Ms. Marla (Señorita Márcia in Latin American Spanish) - The teacher of Salacia's school. She is one of the few inhabitants of Salacia to appear in the series who is not part of royalty. She tends to be very patient with her students. Her hair resembles a blue wave.
- Shark King - Tubarina's father and one of the most powerful men in Salacia. Among the kings, he is the one who appears most during the series, being a very serious and severe man, but deep down he is a good person. Many things that happen in Salacia are mostly decided by him.
- Shark Queen - Tubarina's mother and King Shark's wife. Unlike her husband, she makes very few appearances throughout the series.
- Starfish King and Starfish Queen - Esther's parents. They tend to be very patient with their daughter's antics, who often disobeys them.
- Octopus King and Octopus Queen - Polvina's parents. They have very few appearances in the cartoon.

== TV series ==
Sea Princesses
- Genre: Animation; Fantasy; comedy
- Created by: Fábio Yabu
- Based on: Princesas do Mar by Fábio Yabu
- Directed by: Craig Handley
- Voices of: Katherine Cohn, Paige Walker, Di Adams, Mary-Anne Henshaw, Paul Gleeson, Daniel Wyllie, Mathew Whittet, Shannon Murphy, Jamie Croft, Isabella Dunwill, Olivia Pigeot, Alex Cook, Keith Buckley, Jacqui Lofgren, Eliza Logan, Roslyn Oades, Charlotte Gregg
- Opening theme: Sea Princesses Theme
- Ending theme: Sea Princesses Theme
- Composer: Pep Roig
- Countries of origin: Brazil; Australia; Spain
- Original languages: English; Spanish; Portuguese
- No. of seasons: 2
- No. of episodes: 52

Production
- Executive producers: Cathy Payne, Cristina Brandner, Josep Viciana
- Producer: Noel Price
- Animators: Gloria Calás, Marta Clapés, Pablo Mendelbaum, Jaume Cullell, Maite Flores
- Editor: Marta Capdevila
- Running time: 22 minutes
- Production companies: Southern Star Entertainment; Neptuno Films; Flamma Films

Original release
- Network: Discovery Familia; Discovery Kids (Latin America); ABC
- Release: May 31, 2007 – September 25, 2010

In 2007, an animated TV series was produced co-produced by the Australian production company Southern Star Entertainment and the Spanish studio Neptuno Films, in partnership with the Brazilian production company Flamma Films being supervised by Fábio Yabu. In Brazil, as well as in the rest of Latin America, the cartoon premiered on the Discovery Kids channel on March 24, 2008. The series later aired on TV Cultura on July 12, 2010, broadcasting only the first season.

The series also aired in dozens of other countries around the world. The series made its debut in the United States on Discovery Familia (dubbed into Latin American Spanish) and Discovery Junior (syndication). In 2010, the series debuted on Nick Jr. in Australia before being rerun on free-to-air television by the Seven Network. It has been confirmed than the series would also debut on Treehouse. All characters speak in American accents despite being played by Australian actors.

=== Differences between the cartoon and the books ===
In the cartoon Polvina, Esther and Tubarina are revealed to have been friends since they were babies as shown in the episodes "Best Friends" and "The Guilty". However, in the first book it is shown that Polvina and Esther have only just met Tubarina on their first day of school at the Sea School. Polvina and Esther, by the way, were the only princesses who have always known each other and were friends before entering school, to the point of referring to each other as cousins (what doesn't happen in the TV series). In the first episode, however, it is shown that they have already known all the other princesses before the first day of school. In the books it is shown that in the World of Salacia there is technology with people watching TV and reading magazines sharing many similarities with the Drylanders. However, in the TV series it is not shown that there is any technology or media stuff in this world. Royal families also have servants in the books, but in the TV series they behave like more traditional families without any servants working for them. The cartoon also very rarely shows commoner Salinos, the only recurring exception being Miss Marla, the school teacher. Polvina also has slightly different clothes, in the books they are red, her bra is shaped like two hearts and the octopus on her head is mentioned to be a crown and not her hair (not even being a real octopus either) whose face changes according to Polvina's expressions, but in the animation her clothes are pink and her bra is rectangular, in addition to that in the episode "The Makeover", it is revealed that the octopus on her head is in fact her hair and the face does not move at any point in the cartoon. It was originally planned that Tubarina would have a cousin named Marcela representing the hammerhead sharks, although she was never mentioned in the books, but appeared on the back cover along with the other princesses. However, in the TV series she was recreated as a boy named Marcello with a selfish and bratty personality, and completely different from the one proposed for the girl in the books.

=== Episodes ===
==== Season 1 ====
1. Lost / The Pearl
2. The Boy / The Golden Penguins
3. The Royal Ball / The Biggest Fish
4. The Diary / The Toy
5. The Missing Crown / The Babysitters
6. The Return / Homeless
7. The Monster / The Party
8. Art / The Picture
9. The New Pet / Stage Fright
10. The Argument / The Silence
11. The Excuse / The Race
12. The Rescue / Who's Who?
13. Sharing / Tubarina Almighty
14. The Ticklish Octopus / Shooting Star
15. The Trick / The Big Game
16. One Too Many / The Hammerheads
17. Big Brother / The Lost Kingdom
18. The Gift / Esther's Crush
19. The Head Top / The Dingleberry Mystery
20. The Makeover / The Doll
21. Best Friends / The New Teacher
22. The Big Chill / A Weighty Problem
23. The Brave Turtle / The Dare
24. The Great Escape / The Carnival
25. The Missing Princess / Lunch Power
26. The Angel Fish / Esther's Fear

==== Season 2 ====
1. The Matchmaker / The New Princess
2. The Dancing / Bad Vibrations
3. Rumours / Battle of the Bands
4. The Runaway Grandmother / The Bad Princess
5. The Sick Dolphin / Size Matters
6. Polvina the Teacher / The Pirates
7. A Little Help / A Big Mess
8. Marcello's Friend / The Mural
9. The Forbidden Reef / The Accident
10. The Birds / The Ring
11. The Whale Watchers / The Guardians
12. Friends Forever / The Secret Admirer
13. Princess Poutalot / The Piano Lesson
14. Shark Love / The Twins
15. The Treasure / The Giant Starfish
16. Magic / The Seaweed Potion
17. The Itchy Wrists / The Bite
18. The Surprise Party / Grow Up
19. What's Cooking / Esther's Breakout
20. The Ungrateful Fish / The Too-Playful Shark
21. The Scare / Deep Freeze
22. The Sweet Talker / The Sea Quake
23. The Spidercrabs / The True Princess
24. The Crack of Doom / The Healer
25. The Guilty / The Number Crunchers
26. Beauty / The Last One
