= Reverie Knights Tactics =

- Developer: 40 Giants Entertainment
- Publisher: 1C Entertainment
- Platforms: Linux; macOS; Nintendo Switch; PlayStation 4; Windows; Xbox One
- Release: WW: January 25, 2022
- Genre: Tactical role-playing
- Mode: Single-player

Reverie Knights Tactics is a 2022 tactical role-playing video game developed by 40 Giants Entertainment and published by 1C Entertainment. Players control a party of adventurers who enter hostile territory controlled by goblins. It is set in the Brazilian campaign setting of Tormenta.

== Gameplay ==
Players control a team of adventurers in the fantasy world of Tormenta, a Brazilian campaign setting. Aurora, a young cleric, is looking for father, who disappeared in lands controlled by goblins. She is accompanied by her best friend, a warrior named Brigandine, and Fren, an elf ranger. Reverie Knights Tactics is a tactical role-playing game that features turn-based combat and an isometric point of view. Each character has various special attacks they can make during combat. Players can also perform team-based combo attacks when multiple characters attack the same enemy. While talking to non-player characters, players can choose dialogue options similar to visual novels. Reverie Knights Tactics is linear, but these choices occasionally change the plot or unlock special skills.

== Development ==
1C Entertainment published Reverie Knights Tactics for Windows, Linux, macOS, Switch, PlayStation 4, and Xbox One on January 25, 2022. It was developed in Brazil.

== Reception ==
Reverie Knights Tactics received mixed reviews on Metacritic. NME compared it to Battle Chasers: Nightwar, which they posited as likely influence. Though they found it competently designed and the story to be nuanced, they said it suffers from technical issues and lacks innovation in its gameplay. In contrast, Digitally Downloaded felt the story to be shallow and on the depth of a young adult novel, which they felt clashed with a narrative-heavy video game genre that features tactical depth. Hardcore Gamer praised the story and gameplay depth, but they said it falls short of game series like Disgaea.
