= Reco-Reco, Bolão and Azeitona =

Brazilian Cartoon characters created by Luiz Sá

- Reco-Reco, Bolão e Azeitona characters
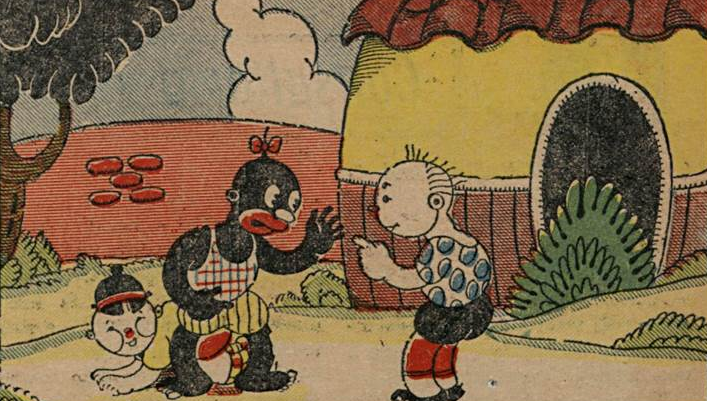
- The trio in a 1932 comic
- First appearance: O Tico-Tico; (1931)
- Last appearance: (1979)
- Created by: Luiz Sá

In-universe information
- Species: Human
- Gender: Male
- Origin: Ceará
- Nationality: Brazilian

Reco-Reco, Bolão and Azeitona were comic characters from the Brazilian children's magazine O Tico-Tico, the first magazine to publish comic strips in the country, which ceased publication in 1977. The characters were three clumsy boys who were always playing pranks on each other. They were created by the Ceará-born caricaturist Luiz Sá in 1931.

They were also responsible for the first two attempts to create a Brazilian animated cartoon back in the 1930s. With the death of Luiz Sá in 1979, the trio retired from comic book creation.

== Legacy ==
Reco-Reco, Bolão and Azeitona are, to this day, considered symbols of the culture of Ceará, the home state of Luiz Sá. In 2024, sculptures of the characters were unveiled at the entrance to Pacoti, as part of the 2nd edition of the Sesc HQ Pacoti Exhibition.

== See also ==
- Brazilian comics
