= J. Carlos =

Brazilian cartoonist (1884–1950)

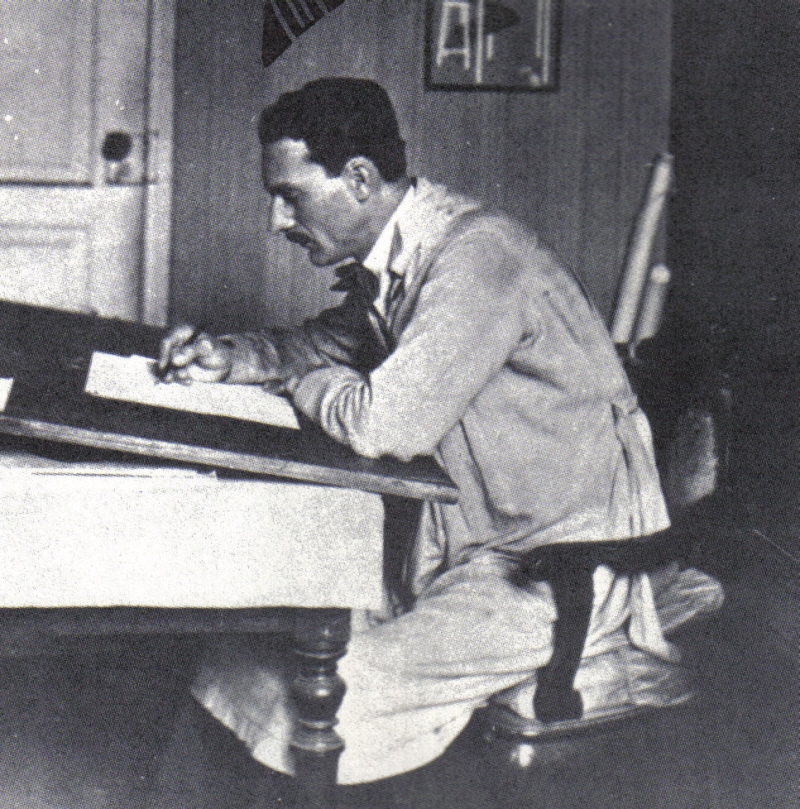
- Born: July 18, 1884 Rio de Janeiro
- Died: October 2, 1950 (aged 66)
- Area: Cartoonist
- Notable works: Lamparina

José Carlos de Brito e Cunha, known as J. Carlos, (July 18, 1884 — October 2, 1950) was a Brazilian cartoonist, illustrator and graphic designer. J. Carlos also did sculpture, wrote vaudeville plays, wrote lyrics for samba and was a major talent in Brazilian Art Deco graphic design.

== Biography ==
Carlos was born and died in Rio de Janeiro. His first work, a drawing of a newcomer, was published in 1902 in the magazine Tagarela. He soon became a regular contributor to the magazine and within less than a year, designed a cover. He collaborated in design and illustration in all the major publications of Brazil from the 1900s until the late 1940s, including O Malho, O Tico-Tico, Fon-Fon, Careta, A Cigarra, Vida Moderna, Para Todos, Eu Sei Tudo, Revista da Semana, and O Cruzeiro.

His oeuvre is estimated to be more than 100,000 illustrations, with a varied range of fictionalized personages and Brazilian popular figures of the time.

In the 1930s, J. Carlos was the first Brazilian to draw Mickey Mouse; he drew the character in covers and advertisements in the magazine O Tico Tico.

In 1941, Walt Disney visited Brazil. Disney was impressed with the style of J. Carlos and asked him to work in Hollywood. The illustrator declined, but sent Disney a drawing of a parrot that inspired the creation of José Carioca.

In recent scholarship, J. Carlos's portrayal of the Black character Lamparina in the children's magazine O Tico-Tico (1928–1944) has been the subject of critical analysis for its use of racist stereotypes. A 2024 academic study examined over 400 comic strips and argued that Lamparina was depicted through exaggerated physical traits and subservient or animalized behavior, reinforcing the racial prejudices of early 20th-century Brazilian society. The authors contextualize the work within the period’s dominant cultural and educational ideals, noting that such imagery reflected the racialized imagination of the era rather than isolated artistic intent.

== Gallery ==
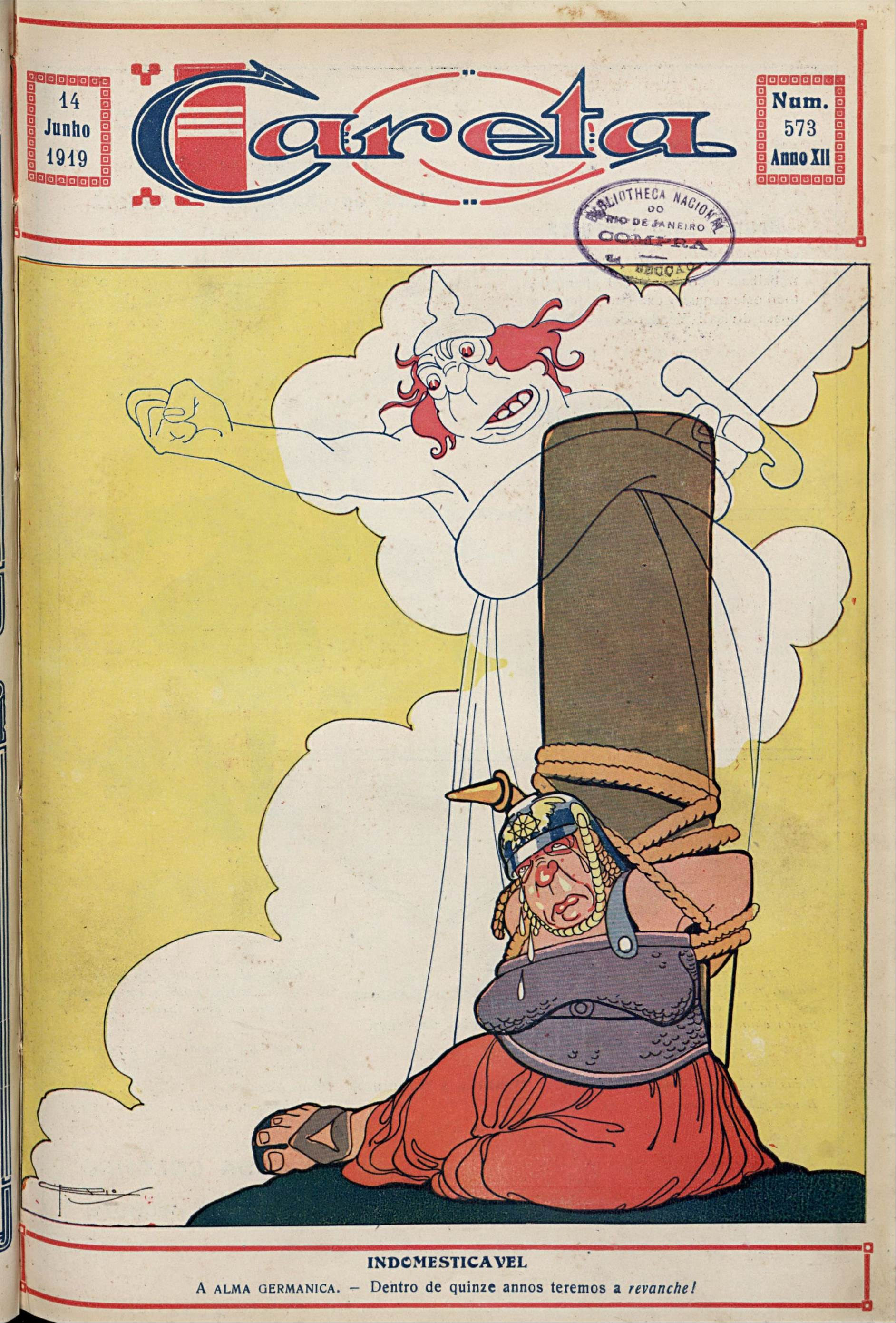
Political cartoon (1919) where J. Carlos predicts that Germany would wage a new war in fifteen years

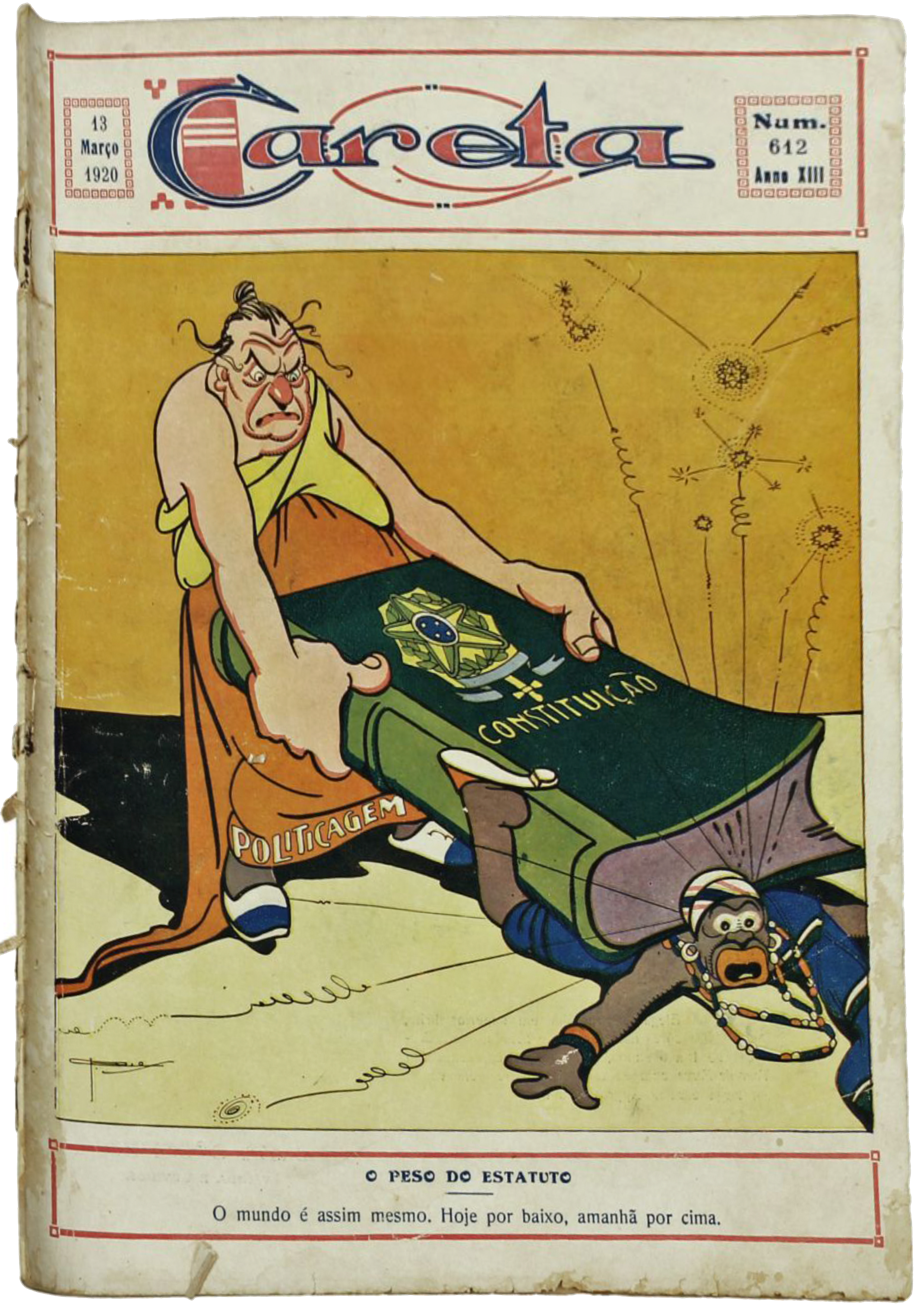
Cover of the magazine Careta (1920)

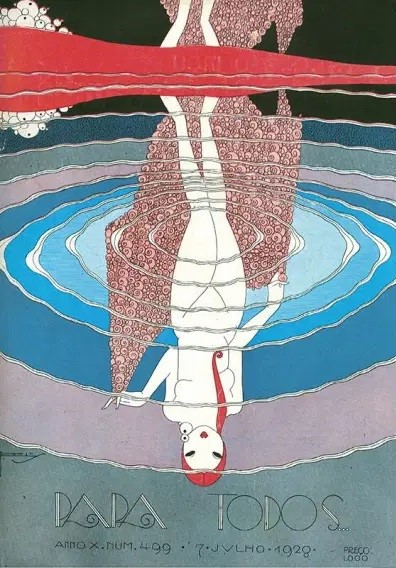
Cover of the magazine Para Todos (1928)

== Bibliography ==
- Zuenir Ventura / Cássio Loredano: O Rio de J.Carlos (J.Carlos' Rio), Lacerda publisher, 1998. ISBN 85-7384-026-9
- Cássio Loredano: O Bonde e a Linha (The Streetcar and the Wire), Capivara publisher, 2003. ISBN 85-89063-10-0
- Herman Lima: História da Caricatura no Brasil: Vol. 3 (Brazilian caricature's history: 3rd Volume), José Olympio Editora publisher, Rio de Janeiro, 1963.
- Julieta Sobral: J. Carlos, designer, in Rafael Cardoso publisher. O design brasileiro antes do design: aspectos da história gráfica 1860-1960 (Brazilian design before Design: graphic's history facets), editora Cosac Naify, 2005. ISBN 85-7503-428-6
