= Luiz Sá =

Brazilian comics artist

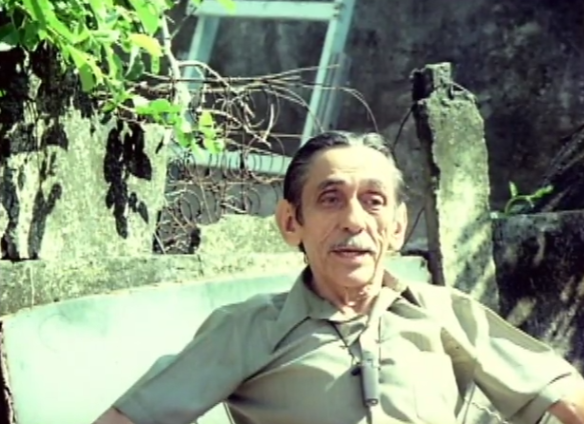
- Born: 28 September 1907; Fortaleza
- Died: 14 November 1979 (aged 72); Niterói
- Occupation: Comics artist, animator, cartoonist, caricaturist, painter
- Employer: O Tico-Tico
- Works: Reco-Reco, Bolão and Azeitona
- Awards: Troféu Angelo Agostini for Master of National Comics (1988)

Luiz Sá (Fortaleza, September 28, 1907 – Niterói, November 14, 1979) was a Brazilian comic book artist, caricaturist, illustrator, painter, scenographer and publicist. Born in the state of Ceará, he moved to Rio de Janeiro around 1929, where he began working for O Tico-Tico, the first comics magazine in Brazil. In O Tico-Tico, Sá created his most famous characters: the trio Reco-Reco, Bolão and Azeitona, considered the first legitimately Brazilian comic book characters and also the most popular of the magazine until its ending, in the 1960s. Sá was also one of the pioneers in Brazilian animation. In 1974, he contracted tuberculosis and, in 1979, he died of complications from the disease. In 1988, he was awarded posthumously with the Prêmio Angelo Agostini for Master of National Comics, an award that aims to honor artists who have dedicated themselves to Brazilian comics for at least 25 years.
