= Tormenta =

Role-playing game campaign setting

- Cover art of the 2010 Tormenta Módulo Básico
- Designers: Marcelo Cassaro, Rogério Saladino, JM Trevisan, Guilherme Dei Svaldi, Gustavo Brauner, Leonel Caldela
- Publishers: Jambô
- Publication: 1999 (Dragão Brasil magazine); 2000 (standalone edition); 2003 (3rd edition/Daemon system edition); 2003 Tormenta d20 (d20 system edition); 2003 Tormenta 3D&T (3D&T system edition; 2005 Tormenta 3.5; 2010 Tormenta Módulo Básico; 2013 Tormenta Edição Revisada; 2017 Tormenta Edição Guilda do Macaco); 2020 Tormenta 20
- Years active: 25
- Genres: Fantasy
- Languages: Brazilian portuguese
- Systems: 3D&T, Daemon system, d20 system
- Playing time: Varies

Tormenta (Portuguese for Storm or Tempest) is a Brazilian fantasy role-playing game campaign setting that has been played at various times with the rules system for Advanced Dungeons & Dragons (AD&D), Runequest, d20 System or 3D&T. It was created in 1999 by Marcelo Cassaro, Rogério Saladino, and J. M. Trevisan as a special booklet to commemorate Issue #50 of the magazine Dragão Brasil. It has been published by Jambô since 2005, is one of the most popular role-playing games published in Brazil, and has spun off related materials such as comic books, novels and a video game.

Currently the game is on its eighth edition, known as Tormenta 20 (celebrating the game's 20th anniversary).

== Description ==
Tormenta is a roleplaying game set in a fantasy world. Its main continent, Arton, is threatened by a magical alien storm called Tormenta that threatens to assimilate and destroy everything and even the gods cannot do anything to stop it. Arton is ruled by the Pantheon, twenty greater gods, but there are infinitely many minor gods (a minor god is essentially anything that has less than a few thousand followers).

=== History ===
In 1998, Brazilian comic book artist and writer Marcelo Cassaro, who was also editor-in-chief of the magazine Dragão Brasil, published a role-playing adventure called Holy Avenger, set in a land called Arton. The three-part adventure was published in issues #44, #45, and #46 of Dragão Brasil using the rules for either AD&D or GURPS. After Holy Avenger was published, Cassaro called his two assistant editors, J. M. Trevisan and Rogério Saladino, to an editorial meeting in his apartment to discuss how to commemorate the upcoming 50th issue of the magazine. The decision was made that the three of them would create a special insert for the magazine detailing the world of Arton, bringing together in one cohesive setting all the characters, locations, items, gods and other separate creations from articles previously published in the magazine. The eventual product was an 80-page booklet inserted into the magazine called Tormenta, named after the magical storm that ceaselessly ravaged the seas around the continent of Arton. The setting was designed to be used with the major roleplaying systems used in Brazil at the time, AD&D, GURPS, and 3D&T, a proprietary rules system created by the magazine.

Word of mouth spread about the Tormenta booklet, and Issue 50 of Dragão Brasil quickly sold out. Demand for Tormenta was so great that some newsstands were reported to be selling the booklet separately. Cassaro, Saladino and Trevisan became known as the "Trio Tormenta". Soon after, they published a new edition using only the rules for 3D&T, in order to avoid copyright issues with Wizards of the Coast and Steve Jackson Games.

Cassaro also republished Holy Avenger as a manga-style comic, with scripts by Cassaro and art by Érica Awano.

The unexpected success encouraged the Trio to publish more articles in Dragão Brasil. Although some readers complained about the excess of Tormenta articles, many readers asked for more. In the following years, the amount of new material, including some created by fans, resulted in new editions and revisions to Tormenta. In 2001, with the creation of the Open Game License (OGL) by Wizards of the Coast, Tormenta Third Edition was launched, followed by Tormenta d20 in 2003. In the same year, an adaptation of Tormenta was also released for the latest revision of 3D&T called 3D&T Turbine.

Over time, Tormenta was so successful that it threatened to outgrow Dragão Brasil. Trio Tormenta decided to create a separate magazine, Revista Tormenta, published by Editora Talismã, which would be solely dedicated to material for the Tormenta setting. The magazine was well received and seventeen editions were released before Editora Talismã withdrew from the arrangement in 2005. The members of the Trio started to work with other publishers, launching RPGMaster (dedicated to 3D&T) published by Mythos Editora; and Dragon Slayer published by Mantícora, which emulated the old Dragão Brasil, with bimonthly releases and initially with content mainly focused on the d20 System and the Open Game License.

The Trio continued to release new editions of Tormenta and 3D&T including a new version of Tormenta D20 published by Jambô Editora, based on D&D 3.5 in 2005; and the next revision of 3D&T, again published by Jambô, under the name 3D&T Alpha in 2008.

However, after Issue #23 of Dragon Slayer, the original Trio (Cassaro, Saladino and Trevisan) stepped down as editors of the magazine, and were replaced by Guilherme Dei Svaldi, Gustavo Brauner, and Leonel Caldela, who became known as Trio Tormenta Ultimate.

In 2010, the two Trios collaborated on a new edition of Tormenta, published by Jambô Editora, with a game system based on OGL, but with many elements of its own. A version of the new Tormenta was again adapted for 3D&T with the launch of the Alpha Adventurer's Manual. In 2013, a revised version of Tormenta was released that contained errata from the previous edition, as well as 16 pages of new material. In 2016, Tormenta Alpha was released, adapting the campaign exclusively for 3D&T. The following year, Tormenta RPG Guild of the Monkey Edition was released.

In 2019, in celebration of 20 years of Tormenta, Jambô launched a crowd-funded campaign on the Catarse website to raise R$80,000 for Tormenta 20, a new RPG system, also based on D20, but with new rules, races, classes and with a complete update of the campaign world. The appeal raised R$1,918,486 (approximately US$600,000), 2,400% of the original target, the largest Brazilian crowd-funding campaign up to that time, and the first to top R$1 million. In June 2026, Jambô launched an open license.

== Campaign books ==
=== D&D 3.5 ===
==== Published by Talismã ====
- A Libertação de Valkaria (The Release of Valkaria)

==== Published by Jambô ====
- Guia do Jogador (Player's Guide)
- Guia do Mestre (Master's Guide)
- Academia Arcana (Arcane Academy)
- Vectora: Cidade das Nuvens (Vectora: City of the Clouds)
- O Panteão (The Pantheon)
- Área de Tormenta (Storm Area)
- Piratas e Pistoleiros (Pirates & Gunslingers)
- Galrasia: O Mundo Perdido (Galrasia: The Lost World)

=== 3D&T system ===
- Manual do Aventureiro
- Manual dos Monstros
- Tormenta 3D&T
- O Reinado (Parts 1, 2 and 3)
- Holy Avenger 3D&T

=== d20 System ===
- The Realm d20
- Holy Avenger d20

== Other publications ==
=== Literature ===
- Storm Trilogy:
  - The Enemy of the World (2004), Leonel Caldela
  - The Skull and the Crow (2007), Leonel Caldela
  - The Third God (2008), Leonel Caldela
- Chronicles of the Storm. Short story anthologies edited by J.M. Trevisan
  - Volume 1 (2011), stories by Leonel Caldela, Marcelo Cassaro, Remo Disconzi, Raphael Draccon, Douglas MCT, Leandro Radrak, Ana Cristina Rodrigues, Rogério Saladino, Antonio Augusto Shaftiel, Marlon Teske, and Claudio Villa
  - Volume II (2016), stories by Ana Cristina Rodrigues, Bruno Schlatter, Davide Di Benedetto, Douglas "Mago D'Zilla" Reis, Guilherme Dei Svaldi, Igor André Pereira dos Santos, José Roberto Vieira, Karen Soarele, Leonel Caldela, Leonel Domingos, Lucas Borne, Marcelo Cassaro, Marlon Teske, Remo di Sconzi, Rogério Saladino, and Vagner Abreu
- A Joia da Alma (2017), Karen Soarele
- A Flecha de Fogo (2018), by Leonel Caldela
- The Goddess in the Labyrinth (2019), Karen Soarele
- O Inimigo do Mundo (The Enemy of World), Leonel Caldela
- O Crânio e O Corvo (The Skull and the Crow), Leonel Caldela
- O Terceiro Deus (The Third God), Leonel Caldela

=== Comics ===
- Holy Avenger, by Marcelo Cassaro with art by Erica Awano
- Dungeon Crawlers, by Marcelo Cassaro with art by Daniel HDR
- 20 Deuses, by Marcelo Cassaro with art by Rafael Françoi;
- DBride: The Bride of the Dragon, by Marcelo Cassaro with art by Erica Awano
- Khalifor, by J.M. Trevisan and Ricardo Mango
- Ledd, by J.M. Trevisan with art by Lobo Borges and Heitor Amatsu
- O Dado Selvagem (The Wild Dice)

=== Game adventures ===
- Attack on Khalifor, by Guilherme Dei Svaldi
- The Lord of Shadows, by Athos Beuren
- The Labyrinth of Tapista, by Lucas Borne\

=== Video games ===
The Challenge of the Gods (2013), action game on 3D platform, by the Digital Games Laboratory of the Feevale University in partnership with Jambô Editora. Reverie Knights Tactics (2022) is a brazilian strategy indie game inspired by the Tormenta RPG universe.

=== Magazines ===
- DragonSlayer
- Magazine Tormenta
- Dragão Brasil, issues 27, 44, 45, 47, 59, 77, 88, 103, 108, 110, and 111

== Reviews ==
- Coleção Dragão Brasil
