= Fábio Yabu =

Brazilian comics and book writer (born 1979)

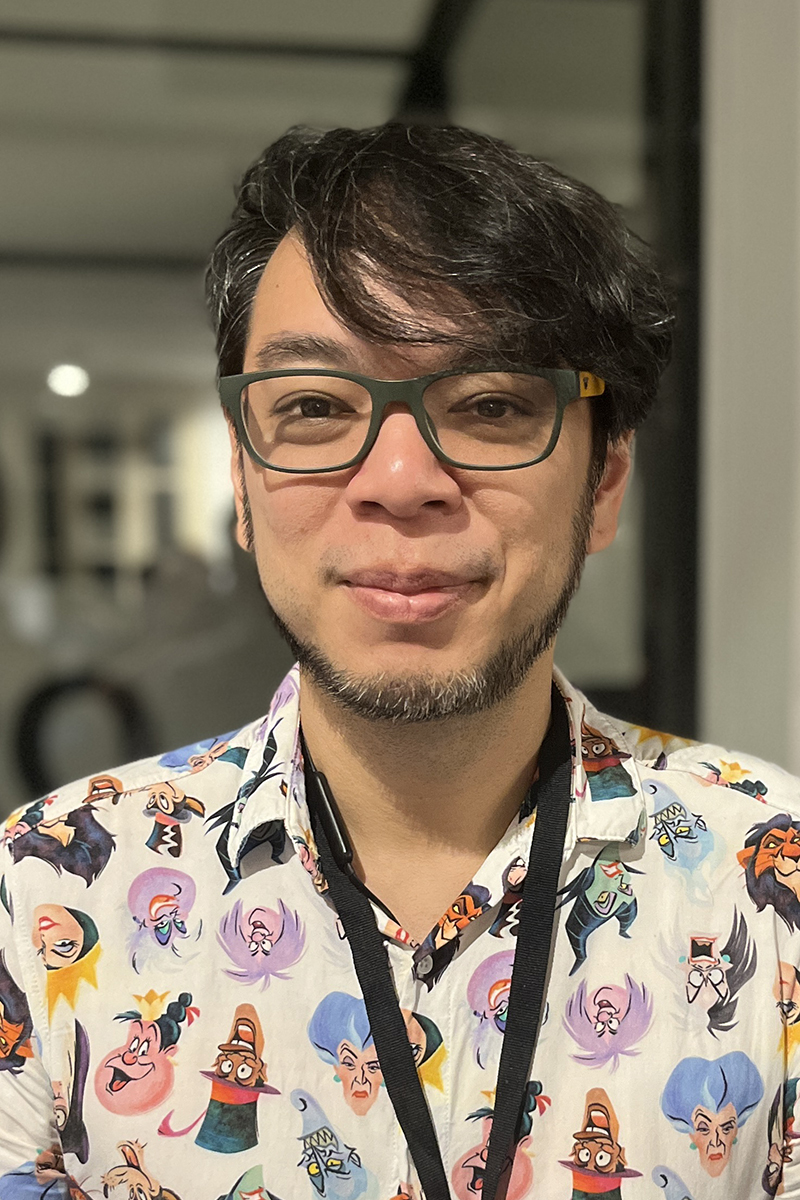
Image of Fabio Yabu

Fábio Yabu (born September 1, 1979, in Santos) is a Brazilian comics and book writer. He is the creator of Combo Rangers, one of the pioneering webcomics in Brazil, and of the Sea Princesses book series and cartoons.
