= Daniel Azulay =

Brazilian cartoonist (1947–2020)

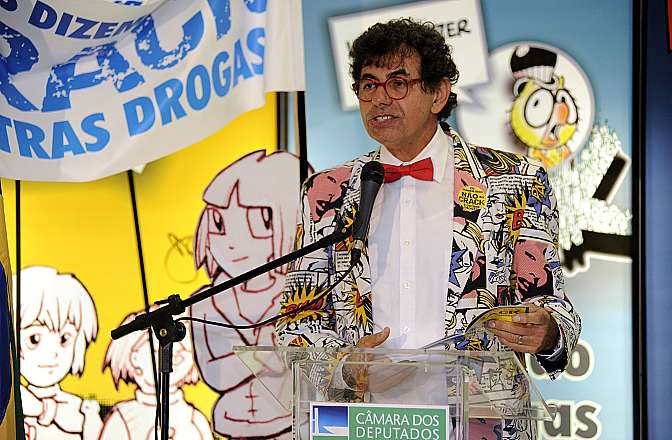
- Daniel Azulay promoting a primer called "Juntos, dizemos não ao crack e outras drogas"
- Born: May 30, 1947 Rio de Janeiro, Brazil
- Died: March 27, 2020 (aged 72) Rio de Janeiro
- Notable works: Turma do Lambe-Lambe

Daniel Azulay (May 30, 1947 – March 27, 2020) was a Brazilian visual artist, comic book artist, and educator, with vast and diverse performance in the press and on TV as a draftsman. He is most known for the children's franchise Turma do Lambe-Lambe. He died during the COVID-19 pandemic due to complications brought on by COVID-19.

== Biography ==
Azulay was born in Rio de Janeiro and raised in Ipanema. He was of Jewish origin and the youngest son of lawyer Fortunato and Clarita, who drew a classic design in Paris.

In 1968, he created the newspaper strip Capitão Cipó, published in the newspaper Correio da Manhã and in 1975, launched the Turma do Lambe-Lambe. Capitão Cipó was a parody on the sexual revolution and is visually a bit similar to Guy Peellaerts famous Jodelle and Pravda pop art graphic novels. It was a precursor in 1976, presenting educational and intelligent TV programs for children for ten years in a row. Azulay had a constructive influence on the 1980s generation who learned from him to design, build toys from domestic scrap, and the importance of recycling and sustainability in defense of the environment.

He traveled the world exhibiting, giving lectures and conducting workshops on art, education and social responsibility. Awarded in Brazil and abroad, his works of contemporary art are part of the collection of private collections and large companies. In 2009, he taught drawing on videos for the UOL website, made specials for Canal Futura and even participated on TV Rá-Tim-Bum.

In 2013, he launched the Diboo website (www.diboo.com.br), an online drawing course for children.

Daniel died on March 27, 2020, in Rio de Janeiro, after being hospitalized for two weeks at Clínica São Vicente (in Rio de Janeiro) due to leukemia. There, he contracted COVID-19 and died of complications caused by the disease.
