= Érica Awano =

Brazilian comics artist

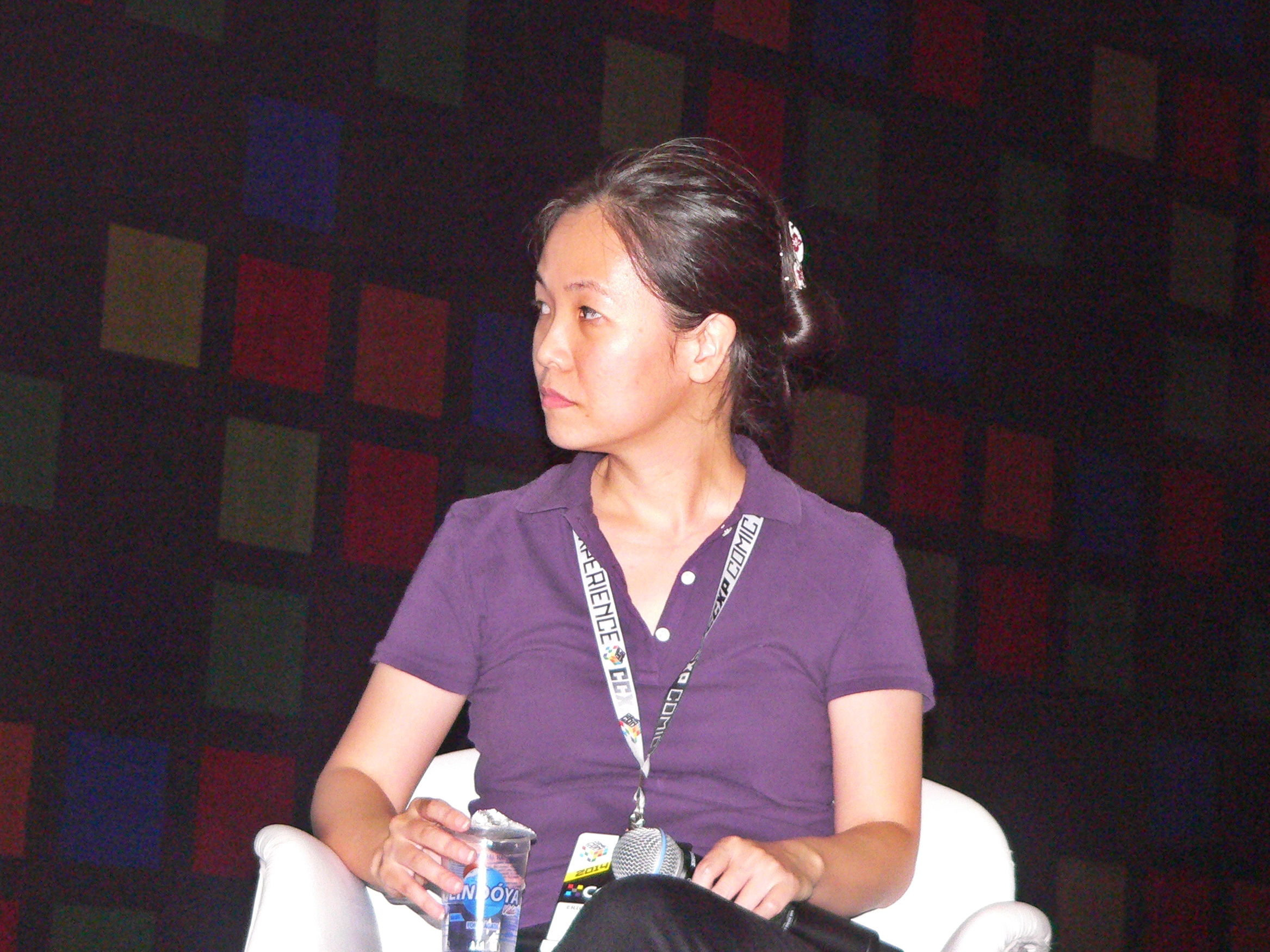
- Erica Awano at the 2014 Comic Con Experience in São Paulo, Brasil
- Born: Érica Awano; 12 December; Brazil
- Occupation: Comic Artist

Érica Awano (born 12 December), is a Japanese-Brazilian comics artist. Her style is heavily influenced by Japanese manga, but differ considerably from traditional manga in their format.

== Biography ==
The daughter of Japanese immigrants, Awano graduated from the University of São Paulo in Literature. She started her career in 1996 illustrating Novas Aventuras de Megaman, a digest size comic book based on the Mega Man franchise. She then worked on a limited series based on Street Fighter Zero 3, written by Marcelo Cassaro and columns on how-to draw for magazines Anime Ex and Animax. She was the co-creator of the mascot of the magazine Anime Do.

She has illustrated role-playing games books for 3D&T and Tormenta, among others. Her most successful and recognized work is the comic series Holy Avenger (a spin-off of Tormenta), which lasted for 42 issues and spawned a handful of other projects, including other comics, an audio CD with professional actors playing the characters, and an animated series.
