= Turma do Lambe-Lambe =

Turma do Lambe-Lambe was a Brazilian media franchise created by comic book artist Daniel Azulay in 1975. The franchise follows a group of characters that consist of human kids and anthropomorphic animals. It was publicly recognized in 1976 when Daniel Azulay signed a contract with the channel TV Educativa (currently known as TV Brasil) to present a children's show, known as A Turma do Lambe-Lambe, from which he used these characters. The program, however, was more successful on Rede Bandeirantes, where it was broadcast until 1986 and marked a legacy as one of the most popular children's shows in Brazil during the 1980s. During this time, A Turma do Lambe-Lambe produced a series of comic books and several LP albums, which were subsequently re-released in CD format.

== Characters ==
- Pita, a circus boy
- Piparote, another circus boy
- Ritinha, Piparote's girlfriend
- Damiana, Pita's girlfriend
- Tristinho, a pierrot
- Professor Pirajá, a scientist owl
- Xicória, a chicken
- Gilda, a cow
- Bufunfa, an elephant

== Television series ==
The series premiered in 1976 on TV Educativa at first with exclusive broadcast only to Rio de Janeiro, but subsequently debuted on Rede Bandeirantes where it started broadcasting nationwide. The series became known for its presentation by Daniel Azulay, that used to teach children how to draw, and also how to make toys with recyclable material. Azulay's characters were played by adults wearing costumes and masks. The series ended in 1986 with the decline of the program's style and the success of presenters like Xuxa. Even after the end of the series Azulay and his characters developed a considered legacy over the years.

== Comic series ==
Between 1982 and 1984 a series of comic books was published by Editora Abril, lasting 20 issues. These comics were designed by the publisher's team of artists who were also responsible for Disney comics such as José Carioca. In the comics Azulay also appeared as a recurring character alongside his characters.
