= 3DeT =

Brazilian tabletop role-playing game

Defensores de Tóquio
- 3D&T Alpha first cover
- Designers: Marcelo Cassaro
- Publishers: Editora Trama, Editora JBC, Jambô Editora
- Publication: 1994 (Defensores de Tóquio or D&T); 1996 (Advanced Defensores de Tóquio or AD&T); 1998 (3ª Edição de Defensores de Tóquio or 3D&T); 2006 (4D&T); 2008 (3D&T Alpha)
- Genres: Superhero, Universal
- Systems: Custom

3DeT, formerly known as 3D&T or Defensores de Tóquio, is a Brazilian tabletop role-playing game, created by Marcelo Cassaro. It is designed to be a very simple, beginner-friendly game system.

== History ==
=== Origin ===
The name of the game is a pun on the famous Dungeons & Dragons or "D&D"; the original version of the game – Defensores de Tóquio ("Defenders of Tokyo") – was a satire of tokusatsu, fighting games, and anime series. It was created by Marcelo Cassaro and published by Trama Editorial, later known as Editora Talismã. It spawned "AD&T" - as implied by the name, an "advanced" edition (and a pun on AD&D). Finally, "3D&T" means "Defenders of Tokyo 3rd edition". The major change on the 3rd edition was that it was turned into a generic game, dropping its satire roots. It was a huge success, becoming as popular as Dungeons & Dragons and Vampire: The Masquerade among Brazilian roleplayers. Its flexibility led to officially licensed adaptations of Street Fighter Zero 3, Final Fight, Mortal Kombat, Darkstalkers, and Mega Man, published in Dragão Brasil magazine. Through Capcom’s licenses, Trama Editora also released the Brazilian edition of Street Fighter: The Storytelling Game (originally by White Wolf) and a Street Fighter Zero 3 manga-style miniseries, wrriten by Cassaro and illustrated by Érica Awano.

An even simpler version, like GURPS Lite called "3D&T Fastplay", was made freely available online.

A revision, "3D&T Manual Revisado, Ampliado e Turbinado", was released in 2003.

Dissatisfied with the poor management at Talismã – also publishers of RPG magazine Dragão Brasil, of which he was editor-in-chief – Marcelo Cassaro left to start a new RPG magazine, RPG Master for Mythos Editora, a magazine entirely dedicated to 3D&T (although the news releases for other systems) and soon after, Dragon Slayer, fully devoted to the d20 System; meanwhile, Talismã kept publishing 3D&T, despite not having the rights to do so. Ultimately, Dragon Slayer was very successful and remains in print, while Talismã closed their doors.

=== 4D&T ===
As a successor to 3D&T, a new system named 4D&T was published in 2006 by Editora JBC (Brazilian publisher of manga). It completely dropped 3D&T's own fast, in this the player uses 4 six-sided dice. The book was published under the Open Game License. This edition is itself a change of the d20 System, but with six-sided dice.

Although it has succeeded on its own, it has been poorly received by 3D&T players, given the original purpose of the system was to be as simple as possible.

=== 3D&T Alpha ===
In May 2008, Cassaro was told by Guilherme Dei Svaldi, editor-in-chief at Jambô Editora, that he found 3D&T to remain very popular, despite being out of print for years. This surprised Cassaro, and gave him the idea of bringing 3D&T back; it was released again in September 2008, under the name "3D&T Alpha" (the new name inspired by Street Fighter Alpha 3, which Cassaro and Erica Awano had adapted into a 4-issue comic book series published by Trama in 1998/99). It is also available as a free e-book from Jambô's website. In this new version, the combat rules remain basically the same; the advantage/disadvantage system was fine-tuned; and, most importantly, the magic system was completely revamped. Also, now the book is printed in landscape format.

In 2010 the first major setting for 3D&T Alpha was announced: Mega City, by Gustavo Brauner. It was finally published in mid-2012, bringing as setting a megalopolis in which five different smaller settings coexist:

- Super Mega City (featuring superheroes and supervillains, similar to characters from DC Comics and Marvel Comics)
- Torneio das Sombras (Tournament of the Shadows, featuring martial artists similar to the ones in video games like Street Fighter, Tekken and The King of Fighters)
- Megadroide (Megadroid, featuring characters equipped with futuristic technology inspired in Japanese pop culture like Mega Man and Astro Boy; a later handbook expanded this setting to include references to Mecha and Tokusatsu genres)
- Crônicas de Nova Memphis (Nova Memphis Chronicles, featuring supernatural creatures such as vampires, werewolves, angels and demons, similar to the World of Darkness RPG setting)
- Mega City Contra-Ataca (Mega City Strikes Back, featuring regular people such as police officers, scientists, athletes and journalists among several other occupations, for more realistic adventures)

Mega City allows to either choose one of the smaller settings to play, or to combine some of them (or even all of them), teaching how to balance the different kinds of characters.

A second major setting was released in the same year: Brigada Ligeira Estelar (Star Light Brigade), by Alexandre Lancaster. It's a mecha/space opera/swashbuckling setting, bringing an empire spread in seventeen solar systems that together form the Constellation of Sabre – main target of invaders from outer space called The Forsaken, while the empire itself is divided by political intrigue. Brigada brings a heavy influence of classic sci-fi anime like Mobile Suit Gundam, Captain Harlock, Legend of the Galactic Heroes and Star Blazers, having as player characters mecha ace pilots, space pirates, space condottieri, swashbuckling noblemen and others.

=== 3DeT Victory ===
In February 2021, a new version of the system was announced, called 3DeT Victory, this version again brings a simpler system. There is currently a beta version called 3DeT de Rodoviária, similar to the old Fastplay versions. To make the publication viable, on August 4, 2023, a crowdfunding was launched on Catarse. In June 2026, Jambô launched an open license.

== Retro-clone system ==
Defenders of Old Tokyo created by Ricardo Cavassane is a retro-clone of Defensores de Tóquio, the game was praised by Marcelo Cassaro.

== Overview ==
A game aimed at beginners, 3D&T focus on simplicity and ease of play.

As in GURPS, each character is built with a pre-determined number of "points" (typically 5) to distribute between the main stats, magic power and advantages and disadvantages.

There are 5 stats:

- "Força" - Strength (which does not only measures the physical might of the character but also skill in melee combat)
- "Habilidade" - Ability (which measures manual dexterity, speed and mental abilities)
- "Resistência" - Resistance (which measures the "health" of the character, and defines its Hit Points)
- "Armadura" - Armor (which measures how well the character can protect him/herself)
- "Poder de Fogo" - Firepower (which measures skill with ranged attacks - anything from firearms to bows and throwing daggers)

The magical powers of characters are defined by "Elemental Paths" ("Caminhos Elementais", in the original), which measure how well the mage can control the elements - there are 6 "Elemental Paths": Fire ("Fogo"), Water ("Água"), Earth ("Terra"), Air ("Ar"), Light ("Luz") and Darkness ("Trevas").

Advantages and disadvantages are special powers which characters can possess; advantages cost points, and disadvantages give more points to spend. Finally, there are also special kind of advantages, called "skills" ("Perícias"), which are things that the character can do, but with no relation to combat: "Animals", "Arts", "Crime", "Investigation", "Languages", "Machines", "Manipulation", "Medicine", "Science", "Sports" and "Survival."
