= O Tico-Tico =

First Brazilian comics magazine

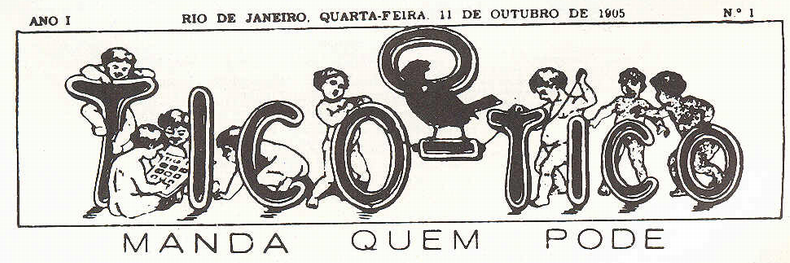
- O Tico-Tico. Logo by Angelo Agostini.
- Founder: Luis Bartolomeu de Souza e Silva
- Categories: children's magazine
- Frequency: Weekly
- First issue: October 11, 1905
- Final issue: 1977
- Country: Brazil
- Language: Portuguese

O Tico-Tico was a weekly Brazilian children's magazine, published between 1905 and 1977. It was the first magazine to publish comics in Brazil. It also featured stories and educational activities. Among its famous readers were Erico Verissimo, Lygia Fagundes Telles, Ruy Barbosa and Carlos Drummond de Andrade.

== History and profile ==
O Tico Tico was founded by journalist Luis Bartolomeu de Souza e Silva, inspired by foreign magazines such as the French Le Petit Journal Illustre de la jeunesse, Le Jeudi de La jeunesse and La Semaine de Suzette. The date of its first issue was October 11, 1905. Luis Bartolomeu de Souza e Silva also launched a satirical magazine, O Malho. O Tico Tico was published by the O Malho group.

The magazine published comics by Brazilian artists such as Reco-Reco, Bolão e Azeitona, by Luis Sá and Lamparina, by J. Carlos and foreign comics, such as Richard Outcault's Buster Brown, (known as Chiquinho in Brazil; its stories were loosely adapted by Brazilian writers), Popeye, Felix the Cat and Mickey Mouse (then known as Ratinho Curioso — "Curious Mouse").

The magazine declined after the 1930s, with the competition of other comics magazines, such as Suplemento Juvenil and O Gibi. It stopped circulating in 1957, only with special editions being released until 1977, when O Tico-Tico ceased to exist.
