= Marcelo Cassaro =

Brazilian writer and game designer

Marcelo Cassaro (born August 15, 1970) is a Brazilian writer of comic books, role-playing games and the science-fiction book Sword of the Galaxy (Espada da Galáxia).

== Early career ==
In 1985, at age 15, Cassaro became a design assistant and in-between artist for animated cartoons in the Maurício de Sousa studios. In 1989, he was hired as an artist and screenwriter by Abril Jovem for television shows like Joe Carioca, Os Trapalhões, and Jaspion.

== Award winning writer and artist ==
In 1999, Cassaro created with artist Erica Awano the manga book Holy Avenger; it became the longest published non-child-oriented comic in Brazil. Like Japanese manga, the first three pages of each chapter were printed in color, while the remaining pages were black and white, and each issue had a two-page map showing the journey of the characters, a summary of previous events, and profiles of the main characters. But going against the standard practice of printing manga so that it read right-to-left, which conformed with Japanese reading practices, Holy Avenger was printed to be read left-to-right instead. It was the first Brazilian manga book to sell 30,000 copies each month. Forty issues were published from 1995 to 2004.

Cassara also worked as author and editor on:

- Dungeon Crawlers
- Victory, the first comic book with Brazilian script and art published in the United States, by Image Comics
- Lua dos Dragões (Moon of Dragons), one of the most awarded miniseries in Brazilian comics
- The Dragon Bride, also with Erica Awano

In 1995, Cassaro started Dragão Brasil, the first Brazilian monthly magazine specialized in RPG games, and the only one to complete more than 100 editions. He left that position and worked as an author of RPGs based on licensed video games such as Street Fighter, Final Fight, Darkstalkers and Megaman. He is also one of the authors of Tormenta, the most successful RPG in Brazil; and 3D&T, an RPG game based on manga and anime.

In 2009, Cassaro started writing for Turma da Mônica Jovem, the best selling comic book in South America.

== Awards ==
- Together with artist Erica Awano, finalist in the First International Manga Contest (Japan, 2007), for Holy Avenger, 2018
- Ângelo Agostini Award as “Mestre do Quadrinho Nacional”, 2018
