= O Malho =

Brazilian weekly satirical magazine

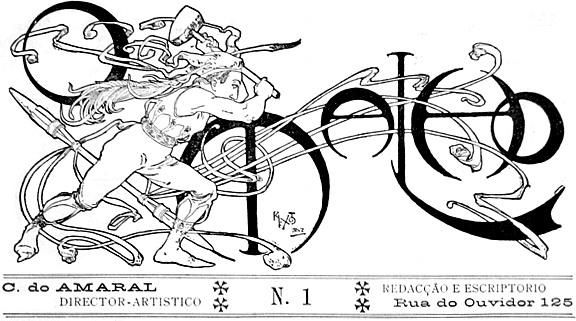
- Logo of O Malho in the first issue
- Categories: Satirical magazine; Cultural magazine
- Frequency: Weekly
- Founder: Luis Bartholomeu Antonio Agnello de Souza e Silva; Antonio Azeredo
- Founded: 1902
- First issue: 20 September 1902
- Final issue: January 1954
- Country: Brazil
- Based in: Rio de Janeiro
- Language: Portuguese
- OCLC: 19233235

O Malho was a Brazilian weekly satirical magazine published from 1902 to 1954. It was based in Rio de Janeiro, Brazil. It was the first commercially successful Brazilian satirical magazine during the Republican regime.

== History and profile ==
O Malho was established in 1902 and the first issue was published on 20 September 1902. Its founders were Luis Bartholomeu Antonio Agnello de Souza e Silva, a member of the Brazilian Parliament, and Antonio Azeredo, a senator. The magazine was headquartered in Rio de Janeiro and was published on a weekly basis. Although the magazine targeted men and women from different social classes, it basically targeted the working-class readers. During the initial years Crispim do Amaral was the main caricaturist of the magazine. Antonio Leal served as the photographer of the magazine. The magazine was part of the O Malho Group which also published a children's and comics magazine, O Tico Tico.

O Malho was the first Brazilian magazine with color pages. The magazine focused on humor and political satire. It contained caricatures and other satirical materials. The magazine also featured musical scores by composers, poems and chronicles. From its start in 1902 to 1926 the magazine regularly featured piano music-related articles in two pages. The work by Elda Coelho on music was covered in the magazine.

Sabino Barroso, president of the Chamber of Deputies, resigned from office due to satirical publications about him in the magazine. In March 1906 O Malho sold 40,000 copies. It folded in January 1954.
