= Chuck Billy (Chuck Billy 'n' Folks) =

Brazilian comic character

- Chuck Billy 'n' Folks character
- Chuck Billy as a 7-year-old boy in Chuck Billy 'n' Folks (top) and Chuck Billy as an 18-year-old boy in Chuck Billy Young Man (bottom)
- First appearance: Removable Newspaper strips of 1961
- Created by: Maurício de Sousa

In-universe information
- Full name: Francisco Antônio Bento
- Gender: Male
- Occupation: Farmer
- Spouse: Rosie Lee (girlfriend)

Chuck Billy (Chico Bento in the original Brazilian strips) is the main character from Chuck Billy 'n' Folks and the titular main Fourstgonist/Character of the Monica and Friends franchise and comic book series, created by Brazilian cartoonist Mauricio de Sousa. He is the biggest work of Mauricio after Monica and Friends, and he has his own cartoon magazine and even some VHS and DVD movies, following Monica's steps.

== History ==
He was created back in 1961, inspired on Mauricio's real life grandfather's brother, whose stories were told by his grandmother, who would inspire a character from the same universe: Vó Dita, described as Chuck's grandmother. It first came to public in 1961, in a short cartoon with two other characters, his best friend Benny and his Japanese friend Taka.

=== Controversies ===
Back in the 1980s, the cartoon was deemed controversial due to the dialogues. Mauricio was trying to represent how a Caipira would talk by writing his lines in a Caipira dialect. Later on, that was changed and every mistake is indicated either in bold or some variant ways.

In 2009, a controversial short strip featuring Chuck Billy and an anonymous character was featured in an issue of Viva! magazine, released in the Brazilian state of Bahia to assist teachers of the state schools. The strip featured a boy saying "My father has more than 800 heads of cattle", to which Chuck answers: "Tell him to take them all up his ass." In the original strip, the boy asks the same thing but ends his sentence with "...what about yours, Chuck?". Billy then simply answers: "My father's got only one cow, but he's got the whole thing." Mauricio de Sousa later stated in his Twitter profile:

It's obvious, but I'm going to explain: I would never make such an impolite thing, as my readers know very well.

Governor of Bahia Jaques Wagner later apologized for the mistake.

== Description ==
Chuck's real original name is Francisco Bento, based on his father's father, Chico being a common nickname for boys with that first name. He is a stereotypical Brazilian caipira child (more like a country person), who walks bare foot, always with a straw hat and lives in a fictional little country town, called Vila Abobrinha. He goes fishing, steal guavas and swims in the local river in his free time.

Chuck Billy was the first child character of Mauricio that attended school, even though he is shown to be a terrible student, specially in his earlier stories. He makes every kind of mistake a student can, such as coming up with excuses (which most of them are hard to believe) of why he ended up being late for school, getting bad grades and not paying attention to class - though he also attains some success every once in a while.

Because the setting is the Brazilian countryside, where there is nature aplenty, many of Chuck Billy's stories are taken on the subject of environmental awareness and Brazilian folklore. The sacis are recurring characters, nearly always against the humans, such as popular folk creatures such as the werewolf, the Headless Mule and the Boitatá.

In the future, he has already been shown as having a son called Urutaia, conveniently named after a jaguar cub he once befriended, but was also portrayed having a son called Quinzinho Bento, whereas a woman next to him (presumably his wife Rosinha) was carrying a toddler.

== Films ==
Chuck Billy and the Marvelous Guava Tree (2025 - first live-action film featuring the character Chuck Billy).

== also ==
- Mauricio de Sousa
- Monica's Gang
