= Chuck Billy 'n' Folks =

Brazilian comic strip

Publication information
- Publisher: Editora Abril, Editora Globo, Panini Comics
- Schedule: monthly
- Format: Ongoing
- Publication date: (Abril series); 1982 - 1986 (Globo series); 1987 - 2006 (Panini series); 2007 - Present
- No. of issues: (Abril series): 114 (Globo series): 467 (Panini series): 100 (first part), 22 (February 2017)
- Main character(s): Chuck Billy (Chico Bento); Rosie Lee (Rosinha); Zeke (Zé Lelé); Benny (Zé da Roça); Taka (Hiro)

Chuck Billy 'n' Folks (Turma do Chico Bento) is a Brazilian comic strip and part of the Monica's Gang comic book series, created by Mauricio de Sousa.

The stories are centered on Chuck Billy (originally named Chico Bento) and his friends and parents, who are all caipiras and live in the small Vila Abobrinha (Zucchini’s Village), a fictional location on the countryside of Brazil. The only characters who don't live on the countryside are Chuck's cousin, Zeca, and his parents, who live in the city.

The comics originally debuted in 1961 in the newspaper "Folha da Manhã", at first having as protagonists the characters Cousin Benny (Zé da Roça) and Taka (Hiro), but the comics changed after the introduction of Chuck Billy in 1963 who due to his popularity with the public, became the main protagonist after a few years. This was also the first and only series by Maurício de Sousa (unrelated with Monica's Gang) to be adapted in its own solo comic book series starting in August 26, 1982.

== Characters ==
=== Main characters ===
- Chuck Billy (Chico Bebeto Francisco Cordeiro Roberto Silva)
- Rosie Lee (Rosinha Rosa Maria da Veiga Gonçalves) - Rosie Lee is Chuck's girlfriend. She mostly appears in the stories dating Chuck or just showing her jealousy of him. Unlike her boyfriend Rosie is a clean, well dressed, and vain girl, though just like him also speaks with a caipira accent. She originally debuted timidly in the comics almost at the same time as Chuck, at first as a support character that was only a love interest for Chuck, only becoming his official girlfriend in the 1980s where she became more prominent in the stories. Her parents rarely appear in comics, mainly because her jealous father disapproves her relationship with Chuck. She studies in the same class as Chuck, although in several stories she is shown to be going to school in the afternoon while Chuck goes to school in the morning. Sometimes she is shown to be a year younger than Chuck and his friends.
- Zeke (Zé Lelé José Leonardo Orestes Cunha Neto) - His name in Portuguese means something like "Joe Nuts". He is Chuck Billy's country cousin, is very distracted and is as bad a student as Chuck. His character was inspired by the twin brother of de Sousa's granduncle, who was the inspiration for Chuck Billy.
- Cousin Benny (Zé da Roça José Augusto de Alcantara Nunes) - Originally called Zé da Roça, which literally means "Joe from the farm", Benny is one of Chuck's best friends. He is the top student of his class and one of the few characters who don't speak with a caipira accent.
- Taka (Hiro Hiroshi Yoshida Takahashi) - Taka is a Japanese descendant. He also speaks correct Portuguese, and lives in a typical Japanese house, adopting some habits from Japan, like Bonsai, Ofuro, etc.

=== Minor characters ===
- Zeca (Zeca José Carlos Alberto Lopes Santos Júnior) - His name is hardly mentioned, as people would call him simply "Chuck's Cousin". He is sometimes called Zeca, but he once introduced himself as Osvalderson. Zeca lives in the city with his parents. In most of the stories featuring him, the main issues are the differences between life in the city and on the farm. When Zeca comes to visit Chuck, he suffers because of the lack of technology and modern equipment. On the other hand, when Chuck visits Zeca, he finds himself lost in the middle of so much technology and other objects he doesn't understand.
- Teacher Marocas - She is the teacher of the local school. she doesn't teach a specific subject, her classes are mostly about basic grammar, literature, history, geography and sciences. She faces a daily challenge when it comes to teach Chico, because of his poor grades and the fact that he rarely does his homework.
- Mr. Lau (Nhô Lau Leonardo Ramos de Oliveira) - Mr. Lau owns an orchard filled with Apple Guavas, which are frequently "visited" by Chuck and his friends, who steal his fruits. Before the arrival of the politically correct, Mr. Lau would respond to these constant attacks by shooting them with his Rifle, which is not charged with true bullets, but with lead, the fruits of the castor oil plant, or even salt.
- Biel (Gabriel de Freitas Menezes Gomes da Costa) – Biel is the son of the local Colonel, Chuck Billy because of his attempts to date Rosie Lee. As Biel is much richer, well-dressed and cleaner than Chuck, Rosie Lee tends to have a Farm on him, but in the end she always comes back to Chuck.
- Mr. Billy (Nhô Bento) - Chuck Billy's dad. He works hard on the farm to support his family and wants Chico to study so he can have a better life.
- Mrs. Cotinha - Chuck Billy's mom.
- Granny Mae (Vó Dita) - Granny Mae is Chuck's grandmother. She is famous for the stories she tells Chuck and his friends. These stories are mostly based on life stories of people she knows, and are sometimes dosed with some folkloric elements. She was inspired by de Sousa's own grandmother.
- Animals - Beyond living on a farm, Chuck is very friendly with animals. Because of this, he holds close relationships with his "pets", which are typical farm animals. The most famous are his chicken, his cow, and his pig, which are called Ma Megg (Giserda), Malhada and Pork Chop (Torresmo). He also owns an unnamed dunce, a dog named Fido and several other animals which appear occasionally. There's also the Jaguar (Onça), a wild feline that is mostly a threat to Chuck and his friends, but would sometimes be treated like a friend. As a wild animal, she lives in the local jungle.

== Media ==
A line of products such as toys, clothing and software are also commonly sold as part of the Monica's Gang products. In 1965 two picture books were released by publisher FTD, one starring Cousin Benny and the other starring Chuck Billy, who was part of a series of books inspired the Mauricio de Sousa's characters. In 1971 a song to Chuck Billy was composed for the album "A Bandinha da Turma da Mônica". The series also has an almanac with classic stories which is published since 1981 by the publisher Abril (now Panini). The series also had some special comic books in the '90s by Editora Globo.

In the videogames Chuck Billy is a playable character in the Brazilian adaptation of the game Wonder Boy III: The Dragon's Trap (known as Turma da Mônica em o Resgate) replacing the Lizard-Man form. He is also playable in the 2018 game Mônica e a Guarda dos Coelhos.

In 2013 a graphical novel based on the Chuck Billy 'n' Folks characters titled: Chico Bento - Pavor Espaciar, was released as part of the Graphic MSP. Another graphical novel titled Chico Bento - Arvorada was released in 2017 made by Orlandeli. Arvorada had a sequel in 2021 called Chico Bento - Verdade.

=== Animation ===
The first appearances of the characters in animation were in TV commercials in the 60s. Several animated adaptations of the comics were adapted into episodes in films such as As Novas Aventuras da Turma da Mônica, Chico Bento, Oia a Onça! and Cine Gibi 2, in total there were 12 episodes focused on Chuck Billy between 1986 and 2005 with some shorts made exclusively for DVDs. Chuck Billy also makes a cameo in the Monica's Gang's 2007 animated film: Uma Aventura no Tempo.

Chuck Billy, Zeke, Rosie Lee and some animals appear occasionally or star in some episodes of the web cartoon Monica Toy. Ma Megg, the Chuck Billy's pet chicken, also appears as one of the protagonists of the web cartoon Biduzidos.

== Spin-off ==
In 2013 a manga-style comic titled Chico Bento Moço (lit. Chuck Billy Young Man) started to be published by Panini. Like Monica Teen the comic shows a grown-up version of the main characters as young adults.
