= List of programs broadcast by Discovery Kids (Latin America) =

This is a list of television programs currently broadcast (in first-run or reruns), scheduled to be broadcast, or formerly broadcast on Discovery Kids, a Latin American cable television channel owned by Warner Bros. Discovery. The channel was launched on November 4, 1996, and airs a mix of animated and live-action programming. Programming may vary across feeds.

== Current programming ==
=== Original programming ===
==== Animated ====
- Underdogs United
- Super Wish (Note: Also on YTV)

==== Preschool ====
- Earth to Luna!
- Mini Beat Power Rockers
- Agent Binky: Pets of the Universe (Note: Also on Treehouse)
- The Dog and Pony Show
- Ba Da Bean
- Lupi & Baduki
- Franklin & Milena on the Quest for Science

=== Acquired programming ===
- 44 Cats
- 50/50 Heroes
- 100% Wolf: Legend of the Moonstone
- Annie Rose's Critter Camp
- Barney's World
- The Beachbuds
- Bubble's Hotel
- Cleo & Cuquin
- Curious George
- FriendZSpace
- Ghostforce
- Hello Kitty: Super Style!
- Kangaroo Beach
- Kung Fu Wa!
- Mermicorno: Starfall
- Open Season: Call of Nature
- Peppa Pig
- Petronix Defenders
- Pinocchio and Friends
- Polly Pocket
- S.M.A.S.H!
- Shasha & Milo
- Super Monsters
- Totally Spies!
- Topo Gigio
- Weird Waters
- Zouk

== Former programming ==
=== Original programming ===
==== Preschool ====
- Fishtronaut
- Doki
- Lilybuds
- Charlie, the Interviewer of Things
- Ricky Zoom

=== Acquired programming ===
- 3, 2, 1, Let's Go!
- Abadas
- Acceso Total
- The Adventures of Chuck and Friends
- The Adventures of Puss in Boots
- The Adventures of Rocky and Bullwinkle
- A.J.'s Time Travelers
- Albie
- Albert Says... Nature Knows Best
- All Hail King Julien
- Amazing Animals
- Annedroids
- Angelina Ballerina: The Next Steps
- Angry Birds Blues
- Angry Birds Stella
- Angry Birds Toons
- Animal Bites
- Animal Mechanicals
- Animal Park
- Animal Planet Zooventure
- Animated Tales of the World
- Animated World Faiths
- Art Attack
- Art Ninja
- Artzooka!
- Babar and the Adventures of Badou
- The Backyardigans
- Bananas in Pyjamas (animated series)
- Banana Zoo
- Barbie Dreamtopia
- Barney & Friends
- Bernard's Watch
- Bert and Ernie's Great Adventures
- Boonie Bears: The Adventurers
- The Big Garage
- Big Top Academy
- Bindi the Jungle Girl
- Bingo and Molly
- Bonehead Detectives of the Paleoworld
- Bookmice
- Boo!
- Bob the Builder
- Bruno and the Banana Bunch
- Caillou
- Calimero
- The Cat in the Hat Knows a Lot About That!
- Charlie and Lola
- Clara en Foodland
- Clifford the Big Red Dog
- Clifford's Puppy Days
- Connie the Cow
- Construction Site
- Cro
- Croc Files
- Cubeez
- Cyberkids
- The Deep
- Desafio All Terrain End of the World
- Digger and Splat
- Dino Aventuras
- Dino Dan
- Dino Detectives
- Dino Safari
- Dinosaur Train
- Dinotrux
- Dog Loves Books
- Doozers
- D.P.A. Detetives do Prédio Azul
- Dragon Tales
- Elmo: The Musical
- Elmo's World
- Elinor Wonders Why (Note: First programming from PBS Kids to first air on Discovery Kids in Brazil before Latin America.)
- The Enchanted Village of Pinocchio
- Enchantimals
- Engie Benjy
- Esme & Roy
- Ethelbert the Tiger
- The Famous Jett Jackson
- Fetch the Vet
- Fifi and the Flowertots
- Floogals
- Fluffy Gardens
- Franklin
- Franklin and Friends
- Franny's Feet
- Friends of Research and Odd Gadgets
- The Fresh Beat Band
- Gaspard and Lisa
- Ghostwriter
- Global Grover
- Going Wild with Jeff Corwin
- Grizzly Tales for Gruesome Kids
- Hanazuki: Full of Treasures
- Harry and His Bucket Full of Dinosaurs
- Helen's Little School
- Henry's World
- Hero Elementary
- Hi-5 Australia
- Hi-5 Fiesta
- Hi-5 House
- Hi-5 (USA)
- How 2
- I Was a Sixth Grade Alien!
- Iconicles
- Incredible Story Studios
- The Insectibles
- Iris, The Happy Professor
- La Isla de Jordan
- It's a Big Big World
- Jack Hanna's Animal Adventures
- Jack's Big Music Show
- Jakers! The Adventures of Piggley Winks
- Jaws and Claws
- Jay Jay the Jet Plane
- Jelly Jamm
- Jim Henson's Animal Show
- The Jolliest Elf
- Julius Jr.
- Jungle Run
- Junior MasterChef
- Just Add Magic
- Justin Time
- Kitty Cats
- Kleo the Misfit Unicorn
- The Koala Brothers
- Kratts' Creatures
- Lalaloopsy
- LazyTown
- LazyTown Extra
- Little People
- The Little Prince
- Little Princess
- Little Red Tractor
- Little Robots
- Little Star
- Littlest Pet Shop
- Littlest Pet Shop: A World of Our Own
- Lost in Oz
- Louie
- Lunar Jim
- Maggie & Bianca: Fashion Friends
- Martha Speaks
- MasterChef Junior
- Mega Movie Magic
- Mentors * Mercurio Más allá de la música
- Meteor and the Mighty Monster Trucks
- Las Micro-Aventuras de Tito
- Mike the Knight
- Milly, Molly
- Miss Moon
- Miss Spider's Sunny Patch Friends
- Mister Maker
- Mister Maker Comes to Town
- Monchhichi
- Monster Math Squad
- Monster by Mistake
- Mortimer and Arabel
- Mr. Magoo
- Mr. Men and Little Miss
- Muppet Babies
- My Big Big Friend
- My Little Pony
- My Little Pony Tales
- My Little Pony: Friendship Is Magic
- My Little Pony: Pony Life
- Mystery Hunters
- Mythic Warriors
- NaturAventura
- Nature Cat
- The New Adventures of A.R.K.
- The New Ghostwriter Mysteries
- Newton's Apple
- No, Really!
- Noddy in Toyland
- Octonauts
- Odd Squad
- The Ollie & Moon Show
- Outward Bound USA
- The Oz Kids
- Pac-Man and the Ghostly Adventures
- Paper Port
- Parque Patati Patatá
- Pat the Dog
- Paz
- Peanuts
- Peep and the Big Wide World
- Peg + Cat
- Piggy Tales
- Ping and Friends
- Pinky Dinky Doo
- Pirates: Adventures in Art
- Plaza Sésamo
- Playdate
- Pocoyo
- Poko
- Poky and Friends
- The Ponysitters Club
- Pop Sci
- Popular Mechanics for Kids
- Postman Pat
- Power Players
- Prehistoric Planet
- Presto! School of Magic
- Princess of the Nile
- Pucca
- Pumper Pups
- The Puzzle Place
- ¿Qué Monstruo Te Mordió?
- Rainbow Ruby
- Real Kids, Real Adventures
- ReBoot
- Religions of the World: Our Worlds Faith
- Rev & Roll
- Roary the Racing Car
- Rob the Robot
- Robot Trains
- Round the Twist
- Rubbadubbers
- Ruta Quetzal
- Sadie Sparks
- Sail Away
- Salty's Lighthouse
- Sammy and Company
- The Save-Ums!
- Sci Q
- Sci Squad
- Scouts en Acción
- Scream Street
- The Screech Owls
- Sea Princesses
- The Secret Lair
- Sid the Science Kid
- Siete y yo
- Sky Trackers
- S.O.S. Fada Manu
- Splat!
- Spy Academy
- The Storyteller
- The Strange Chores
- Strawberry Shortcake's Berry Bitty Adventures
- Sugar Skulls
- Super Dinosaur
- Super Why!
- Super Wings
- Team Dronix
- Teletubbies
- Teletubbies Everywhere
- Testament: The Bible in Animation
- This Is Daniel Cook.
- This Is Emily Yeung.
- Thomas & Friends
- Tiny Planets
- ToddWorld
- Too Cute
- Toot & Puddle
- Tots TV
- Tracey McBean
- Transformers: Rescue Bots
- Transformers: Rescue Bots Academy
- Tree Fu Tom
- Trucktown
- Truth or Scare
- Turbo Fast
- Twipsy
- The Ultimate Guide
- Ultimate Guide to the Awesome
- Ultra-Misión
- Vigias del Sur
- Vivi
- Walking with Dinosaurs
- Weird-Ohs
- What's the Big Idea?
- Wide-Eye
- Winnie and Wilbur
- Winnie the Whimsical
- Wisdom of the Gnomes
- The World of David the Gnome
- Wilbur
- Wild Kratts
- Will and Dewitt
- Willa's Wild Life
- Winx Club
- Wishbone
- Wissper
- WordGirl
- WordWorld
- The Worst Witch
- Wow! Wow! Wubbzy!
- The Zack Files
- Zak Storm
- The ZhuZhus
- Zoboomafoo
- Zack & Quack
- El Zoo de Zu

== See also ==
- List of programs broadcast by Cartoon Network (Latin America)
