= Peixonauta – Agente Secreto da O.S.T.R.A. =

2012 film directed by Célia Catunda, Kiko Mistrorigo

Peixonauta - Agente Secreto da O.S.T.R.A.
- Theatrical release poster
- Directed by: Célia Catunda; Kiko Mistrorigo; Carol Mistrorigo
- Written by: Marcela Catunda; Marcus Aurelius Pimenta
- Starring: Celso Alves; Fábio Lucindo; Fernanda Bullara
- Music by: Paulo Tatit
- Production company: TV PinGuim
- Distributed by: Paramount Pictures
- Release date: 9 November 2012
- Running time: 95 minutes
- Country: Brazil
- Language: Portuguese

Peixonauta – Agente Secreto da O.S.T.R.A. is a 2012 Brazilian animated anthology film directed by Célia Catunda and Kiko Mistrorigo based on the Fishtronaut (Portuguese: Peixonauta) animated TV series. It was also dubbed in Latin American Spanish under the title Peztronauta: Agente secreto.

The film itself blends an original story with a compilation of seven episodes of the animated series. It was later succeeded by the feature length animated movie Peixonauta: O Filme in 2018.

== Plot ==
Fishtronaut prepares for a new adventure, this time to be a Secret Agent of O.S.T.R.A. (Organização Secreta para Total Recuperação Ambiental, in English "Secret Organization for Total Environmental Restoration" (S.E.A.); ostra means "oyster" in Portuguese). In order to earn the badge and become the secret agent, he is tasked with completing seven missions with the help of his friends, Marina and Zeek, and also the whole gang of the Smiling Trees Park.
