= Tarsilinha =

- Directed by: Célia Catunda; Kiko Mistrorigo
- Written by: Marcus Aurelius Pimenta; Fernando Salem
- Produced by: Ricardo Rozzino
- Starring: Marisa Orth; Alice Barion; Maira Chasseroux; Ando Camargo; Skowa; Rodolfo Dameglio
- Music by: Zeca Baleiro
- Production company: Pinguim Content
- Distributed by: H2O Films
- Release date: March 15, 2022
- Running time: 89 minutes
- Country: Brazil
- Language: English

Tarsilinha is a 2022 Brazilian animated film created by Célia Catunda and Kiko Mistrorigo. The film is a tribute to the artist Tarsila do Amaral, inspired by her set of works through a journey of adventures of an eight-year-old girl named Tarsilinha.

== Synopsis ==
Tarsilinha, an eight-year-old girl, embarks on a fantastic journey to recover her mother's memory. To do so, she must find several important objects: the souvenirs that were stolen. During this walk, Tarsilinha will see many amazing things and build friendships, but she will also have to face her fears, overcome obstacles and return home safely with all her memories recovered.

== Cast ==
The voice cast of the film is made up of several actors, actresses and voice actors, highlighting Marisa Orth (Lagarta), Alice Barion (Tarsilinha), Maira Chasseroux (Tarsilinha's mom), Ando Camargo (Sapo), Skowa (Saci) and Rodolfo Dameglio (Bicho Barrigudo).

== Production ==
The film was created by Célia Catunda and Kiko Mistrorigo, founders of TV Pinguim (Pinguim Content), the same creators of the Fishtronaut and Earth to Luna! franchises. Zeca Baleiro composed the film's theme song, inspired by the work of Villa Lobos. It is sung by the singer himself along with the singer Ná Ozzetti.

The film's setting is inspired by Tarsila do Amaral's works, such as A Lua e a Cuca, where the main character enters her adventures. The film was conceived for about 12 years by Tarsilinha do Amaral, great-niece of the famous painter Tarsila. The animation production was carried out by mixing 2D and 3D images.

== Release ==
The film was screened at the 20th Florianópolis Children's Film Festival on October 23, 2021.

The film's release was scheduled for the first half of 2020, however it had to be postponed due to the advance of the COVID-19 pandemic. The producer decided to release a teaser clip of the film with the theme song sung by Zeca Baleiro and Ná Ozzetti, as a way to warm up for the film's release in November 2021. There were negotiations with streaming companies to release the film digitally, such as Netflix, however the production chose to wait for the theatrical release. The release was later scheduled for February 10, 2022 by H2O Films. However, it only hit theaters on March 15.
