= Turma da Mônica – Laços =

2013 graphic novel

Turma da Mônica - Laços

Publication information
- Publisher: Panini Comics
- Genre: Adventure
- Publication date: June, 2013
- Main character(s): Monica's Gang

Creative team
- Written by: Vitor Cafaggi; Lu Cafaggi
- Artist(s): Vitor Cafaggi; Lu Cafaggi

Collected editions
- Turma da Mônica - Laços: ISBN 9788565484572

Turma da Mônica – Laços (transl. Monica's Gang - Bonds) is a 2013 Brazilian graphic novel written and illustrated by Vitor Cafaggi and Lu Cafaggi (known for the Puny Parker strips, based on the childhood of Peter Parker), based on the Monica's Gang characters created by Maurício de Sousa. It is part of the Graphic MSP series of graphic novels based on Maurício de Sousa characters.

== Synopsis ==
Fluffy disappeared. To find his pet dog Jimmy Five will count with the help of his friends Smudge, Monica and Maggy in an "infallible" plan.

== Inspiration ==
The Cafaggi brother's inspiration for the graphic novel came from children's films from the 1980s such as Stand by Me and The Goonies.

== Film adaptation ==
In December 2015, it was announced the production of a live-action film based on the graphic novel and set to be released on June 27, 2019.
