= Nobody's Looking =

Brazilian comedy drama television series

- Genre: Fantasy comedy
- Created by: Daniel Rezende; Carolina Markowicz; Teodoro Poppovic
- Written by: Mariana Trench; Mariana Zatz; Rodrigo Bernardo; David Tennenbaum; Fernando Fraiha; Leandro Ramos; Cauê Laratta; Felipe Sant'Angelo
- Directed by: Daniel Rezende; Fernando Fraiha; Marcus Baldini
- Starring: Victor Lamoglia; Kéfera Buchmann; Júlia Rabello; Augusto Madeira; Danilo de Moura; Leandro Ramos; Telma de Souza
- Country of origin: Brazil
- Original language: Portuguese
- No. of seasons: 1
- No. of episodes: 8

Production
- Producers: Caio Gullane; Fabiano Gullane
- Running time: 19–30 minutes
- Production company: Gullane Entretenimento

Original release
- Network: Netflix
- Release: 22 November 2019

Nobody's Looking (Portuguese: Ninguém Tá Olhando) is a Brazilian fantasy comedy television series that premiered on Netflix on November 22, 2019.

== Plot summary ==
Ulisses (Uli, for short) is the first new guardian angel to join the Angelus System in 300 years. Quickly dissatisfied with how arbitrary the orders he receives daily are, he decides to rebel and discover for himself the limits between good and evil, to the chagrin of his tutors, Greta and Chun, and his manager, Fred. On the other side there is the earthly Miriam, a girl full of mixed beliefs, from Buddhism to astrology, which hinder her life more than they help.

== Cast ==
=== Main ===
- Victor Lamoglia as Ulisses 'Uli' Angelus
- Kéfera Buchmann as Miriam Lopes Teixeira
- Júlia Rabello as Greta Angelus
- Augusto Madeira as Fred Angelus
- Danilo de Moura as Chun Angelus
- Leandro Ramos as Sandro Serra
- Telma de Souza as Wanda Angelus

=== Recurring ===
- Projota as Richard A. de Souza
- Sergio Pardal as Valdir "The Prophet" Soares
- Felipe Riquelme as Tobias Angelus
- Kevin Vechiatto as Querubim Angelus
- Eliana Gutmann as Cilene
- Fafá Rennó as Tânia
- Felipe de Carolis as Marcos Veloso

== Episodes ==
No.	Title	Directed by	Written by	Original release date
1	"Shoot!"	Daniel Rezende	Mariana Trench, Mariana Zatz and Rodrigo Bernardo	November 22, 2019
Uli, the first new guardian "angelus" in 300 years, joins the Angelus System. But his inquisitive nature disrupts the system's rule-governed order.
2	"Oh My Hamster"	Daniel Rezende	David Tennenbaum and Mariana Zatz	November 22, 2019
To repair the damage he's caused, Uli breaks a third rule, so he can seek help from veterinarian Dr. Sandro and good Samaritan Miriam.
3	"Life isn't random by chance"	Fernando Fraiha	Fernando Fraiha, Leandra Ramos and Mariana Zatz	November 22, 2019
Uli realizes Miriam and her boyfriend Richard are ill-suited to each other, so he and Chun try to find the perfect new partners for them. Greta discovers the joys of food.
4	"Suck it, Hamster!"	Marcus Baldini	Mariana Zatz	November 22, 2019
Greta gives sex a try. Chun develops feelings for the woman he's protecting. Uli uses a costume party to help a couple fulfill a secret sexual desire.
5	"Not angel, angelus"	Fernando Fraiha	Cauê Laratta, Leandro Ramos and Mariana Zatz	November 22, 2019
When the angeli see a guru promoting fallacies about them, Uli decides to set her straight. When the woman Chun is protecting dies, he thinks the Chief is punishing him.
6	"(dis)beliefs"	Marcus Baldini	David Tennenbaum and Mariana Zatz	November 22, 2019
Miriam's belief in astrology hinders her relationship with Uli. Greta visits a witch doctor. Fred interprets Uli's lack of punishment by the Chief as a sign.
7	"Immortal?"	Daniel Rezende	Felipe Sant'Angelo and Mariana Zatz	November 22, 2019
When Fred accuses Uli of having made no positive impact during his time as an angelus, Uli revisits all the people he helped to see if their lives have since improved.
8	"Under the wing"	Daniel Rezende	Mariana Trench and Mariana Zatz	November 22, 2019
Uli visits Miriam at her parents' home, where he makes a key discovery. Dr. Sandro tries an experimental procedure in hopes of curing Greta.

== Production ==
Season 2 was cancelled because the first season didn't have enough viewers and had high production costs, although the series was widely appreciated by the audience and won an Emmy award.

== Release ==
Nobody's Looking was released on 11 November 2019 on Netflix.

== Awards ==
Award	Year (Note: The listed year refers to the date of the ceremony.)	Category	Nominee(s)	Result	Ref.
Prêmio ABC	2020	Best Art Direction (TV Series)	Rafael Ronconi	Won	
Prêmio ABC	2020	Best Cinematography (TV Series)	Azul Serra	Nominated	
International Emmy Awards	2020	Best Comedy Series	Nobody's Looking	Won	
