= Giulia Benite =

Brazilian actress

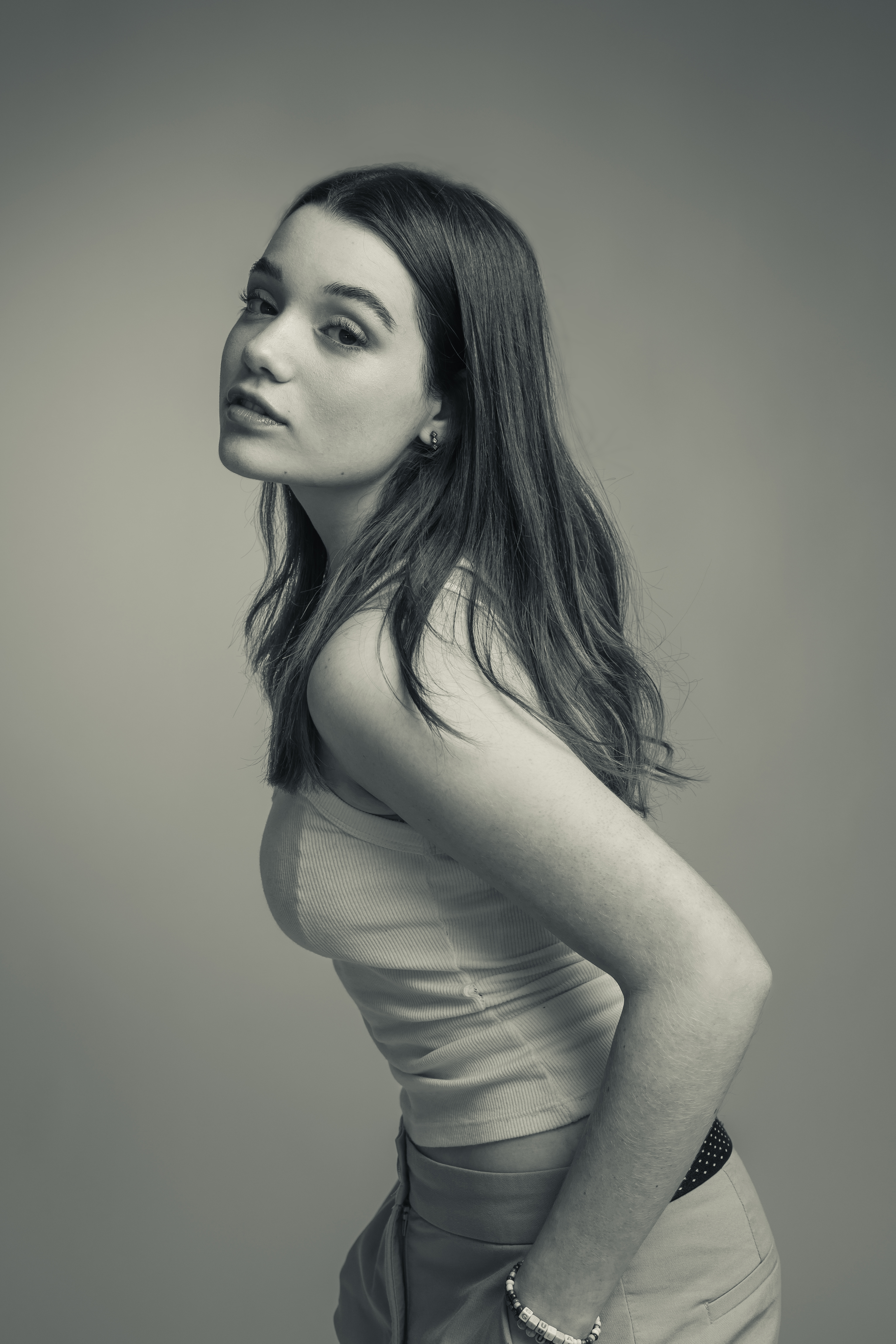
- Benite in 2023
- Born: Giulia Barreto Benite; 14 June 2008 (age 18); São Paulo, Brazil
- Occupation: Actress
- Years active: 2019–present

Giulia Barreto Benite (born 14 June 2008) is a Brazilian actress. She is known for portraying Monica in Turma da Mônica: Laços and Turma da Mônicaː Lições.

== Biography and career ==
Giulia was born in São Paulo, daughter of Clenci Benite and Adriana Barreto. She has a sister, Bela Benite, who studied theater. Inspired by her sister, Giulia tried out for films, but was unsuccessful. In April 2017, she auditioned to play Mônica in the film Laços and got the role. Laços debuted in 2019 and Giulia was acclaimed. The role gave her new work, and in 2019 she participated in the series Segunda Chamada and recorded the film 10 Hours for Christmas, alongside Luis Lobianco, Lorena Queiroz and Pedro Miranda. She won the Newcomer of the Year award, from Meus Prêmios Nick, for the role of Mônica. In 2021, she starred in the sequel to Laços, Lições and participated in the second and final season of Segunda Chamada. In 2022, she reprised the role of Mônica in the finale of the trilogy Turma da Mônica - A Série. In 2024, she played Bebel, a young woman in a wheelchair who leaves the countryside to live in the big city in order to complete her studies. Chama a Bebel premiered in theaters in January. In May he returns to cinemas in De Repente, Miss, a comedy starring Fabiana Karla and Danielle Winits.

Giulia also auditioned in 2020 to play the character America Chavez in Doctor Strange in the Multiverse of Madness, where she passed the first phase, however, the role ended up going to Xochitl Gomez. In 2022, she also auditioned for the character Annabeth Chase in Percy Jackson, but the role went to Leah Jeffries.

== Filmography ==
=== Television ===
Year	Title	Role	Notes
2019–2021	Segunda Chamada	Giovana Carrasco	3 episodes
2022	Turma da Mônica - A Série	Mônica Sousa	Original Globoplay
2024	Mal Me Quer	Malu	
2025	Partiu XV	Juror	"Episode 2"
2025	Arcanjo Renegado	Yasmin	Season 4

=== Cinema ===
Year	Title	Character
2019	Monica and Friends: Bonds	Monica Sousa
2020	10 Horas para o Natal	Júlia
2021	Turma da Mônicaː Lições	Monica Sousa
TBA	Anne Frank: Memorial do Holocausto	Anne
2023	Perlimps	Bruô (voice)
2024	Chama a Bebel	Bebel
2024	De Repente, Miss	Luiza
2024	Morando com o Crush	Luana
2026	Rumor	Olivia
2026	Minha Melhor Amiga	Manu
2026	Wildwood	Prue Mckeel (Brazilian voice)

== Theater ==
Year	Title	Role
2020	Matilda	Matilda

== Awards and nominations ==
Year	Award	Category	Work	Result
2019	Meus Prêmios Nick	Revelation of the Year	Monica and Friends: Bonds	Won
2022	Festival SESC Melhores Filmes	Best National Actress	Turma da Mônica: Lições	Nominated
2022	SEC Awards	Best National Actress in a Film	Turma da Mônica: Lições	Nominated
2022	Prêmio Guarani de Cinema Brasileiro	Best Actress	Turma da Mônica: Lições	Nominated
2022	Prêmio Jovem Brasileiro	Best Actress	Turma da Mônica - A Série	Nominated
2022	Prêmio Jovem Brasileiro	Young Man of the Future	Giulia Benite	Nominated
2022	Prêmio Jovem Brasileiro	Digital Revelation	Giulia Benite	Won
2023	SEC Awards	Best Actress in a Teen Series	Turma da Mônica - A Série	Won
