= Bianca Alencar =

Brazilian voice actress

- Born: Bianca Silva Alencar
- Occupations: Voice actress; dubbing director
- Years active: 1998–present

Bianca Silva Alencar (Portuguese pronunciation: [biˈɐ̃kɐ alẽˈkaʁ]) is a Brazilian voice actress and dubbing director. She is recognized as a reference in female leadership within the voice acting and digital entertainment industry in Brazil.

Alencar's work in Brazilian Portuguese dubbing includes animated series such as My Little Pony: Friendship Is Magic, Gravity Falls, Charlie and Lola, and Pinky Dinky Doo, as well as anime films like Ponyo and One Piece Film: Red. She has also dubbed the actress Kim You-jung in Korean dramas including 20th Century Girl and My Demon. In video games, she voiced Zoe in League of Legends. She has additionally provided original voices for characters such as Kika in Dino Aventuras and Maggy in Monica Adventures.

== Career ==
Bianca Alencar began performing at an early age. At just four years old, she made her first appearance on national television on the Programa Raul Gil. Between the ages of five and seven, she worked as a dancer on Carla Perez’s television show, joined the ballet of the Pequenos Brilhantes project, and, in 2002, became a member of Galera do Balão, a reboot of Turma do Balão Mágico. After the group disbanded, she focused on theater. At the age of 11, she received an invitation to audition for a dubbing role. She passed the audition and went on to voice the title character in the Brazilian Portuguese dub of Pinky Dinky Doo, which aired in Brazil on Discovery Kids. This experience sparked her passion for dubbing and led her to pursue a career in the field.

At the age of 18, she participated in the talent show Ídolos on Record, where she reached the semifinals.

In 2022, she became a dubbing director at the Brazilian studio Centauro Produções.

== Voice work ==
=== Dubbing ===
==== Animations ====
List of animated characters dubbed by Bianca Alencar in Brazilian Portuguese
Role	Appearance	Ref.
Pinky Dinky Doo	Pinky Dinky Doo	
Lola	Charlie and Lola	
Ponyo	Ponyo	
Twilight Sparkle	My Little Pony: Friendship Is Magic	
Mabel Pines	Gravity Falls	
Taffyta Muttonfudge	Wreck-It Ralph	
Princess Clio	Sofia the First	
Yuki	Recovery of an MMO Junkie	
Moxie Freemaker	Lego Star Wars: All-Stars	
S.A.M.	Cannon Busters	
Uta	One Piece Film: Red	
Mary Hunt	My Next Life as a Villainess: All Routes Lead to Doom! The Movie	
Ne Zha	Ne Zha 2	
Íris	Arco	

==== Actresses ====
List of actresses and roles dubbed in Brazilian Portuguese by Bianca Alencar
Actress	Role	Appearance	Ref.
Ariel Winter	Alex	Modern Family	
Kahyun Kim	New Media	American Gods	
Sydney Wade	Sophia	I Kill Giants	
Ester Expósito	Carla	Elite	
Mackenzie Foy	Clara	The Nutcracker and the Four Realms	
Eva Carlton	Caren Greene	Little	
Kim You-jung	Na Bo-ra	20th Century Girl	
Kim You-jung	Do Do-hee	My Demon	
Dahyun	Oh Seon-ah	You Are the Apple of My Eye	
Veronika Zhuravleva	Polina	Your Heart Will Be Broken	

==== Video games ====
List of video game characters dubbed by Bianca Alencar in Brazilian Portuguese
Role	Appearance	Ref.
Zoe	League of Legends	

=== Original voice ===
Year	Role	Appearance	Ref.
2015–2018	Kika	Dino Aventuras	
2019	Maggy	Monica Adventures	

== Discography ==
=== Singles ===
Title	Year	Album
"Lado a Lado"	2017	Non-album single
"Side by Side"	2017	Non-album single
"Tudo Vai Mudar"	2017	Non-album single
"Você Vai Conseguir"	2018	Non-album single
"Nada É Impossível"	2019	Non-album single
