= Projota =

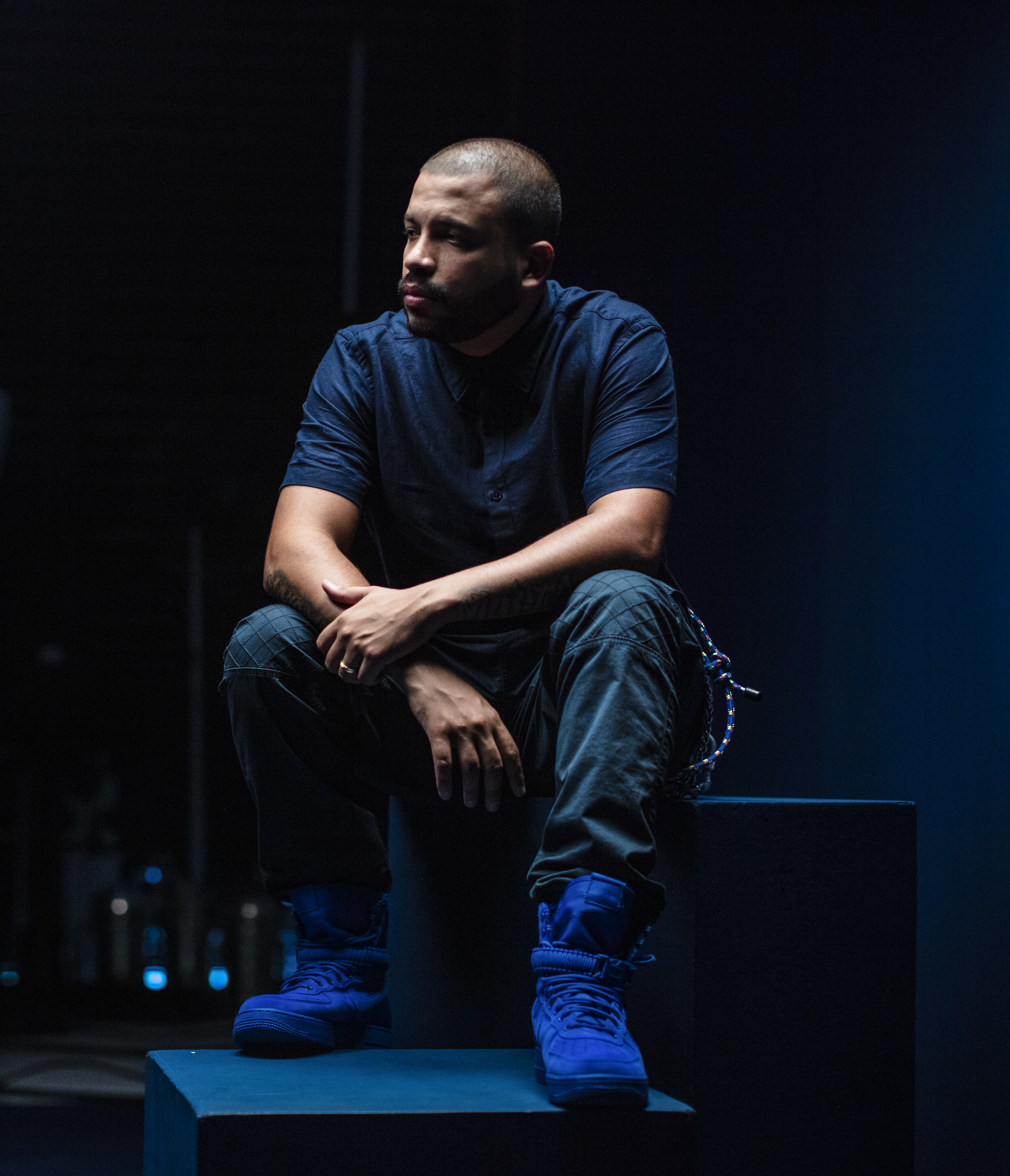

Background information
- Born: José Tiago Sabino Pereira; 11 April 1986 (age 40); São Paulo, Brazil
- Genres: Hip hop; R&B
- Occupations: Rapper, composer, actor
- Years active: 2008–present

José Tiago Sabino Pereira (born 11 April 1986), better known by his artistic name Projota, is a Brazilian rapper, composer, and actor.

In 2014, Projota released his debut album, Foco, Força e Fé. In 2016, he later released his first DVD, 3Fs ao Vivo, which received the a golden record certification for 40,000 records sold. His second studio album was released in 2017 and was certified as a gold record after 40,000 copies were sold. This was followed by the 2019 release of his album Tributo dos Sonhadores, which was also gold certified.

== Early life ==
Projota lost his mother at seven years old. His mother, Dirce Sabino Pereira, had suffered a stroke, remaining in a vegetative state for around two years before she died. He was then sent to live with his grandmother, Dona Lourdes, who, along with him, raised three other grandchildren. He attributes his interest in music to his mother who, along with singing, also acted, wrote, and composed. His first artistic name was "JT", but as there were many people already with that name, he changed it using a combination of "pro" (for professionalism) and "Jota" (or J), the first initial of his name. Projota definitively entered the Brazilian rap scene at 17 years old, when he happed the music video for "Só Deus Pode me Julgar" by Rio de Janeiro-based rapper MV Bill. During his teenage years, Projota took part in two groups, though they released little music. One of them, O Dom da Rima, was formed together with his friend, Rashid, during which Projota was known as "Jotatê" and Rashid as "Moska".

== Career ==
=== 2006-2011: Beginning of career and success ===
Projota first took part in an MC battle in 2006. He won the Batalha do Santa Cruz 4 times, the Rinha dos MCs 3 times, and reached the final of the Liga dos MCs in 2007, the oldest MC battle in Brazil. Alongside his career as a participant in MC battles, he worked with A.G. Soares, fromPentágono, a legendary musical producer. The rapper took part in the documentary Freestyle: Um Estilo de Vida, where she gave an interview. Among the principal songs recorded by Projota include O Poeta, Ela, and Avoadão. In 2008, he released more music and a music video with Acabou, which rapidly gained much popularity on YouTube, reaching more than 400,000 views on the website in two years. In 2008, he released a recording of songs from his first EP, which was released in 2009 as Carta aos Meus. Tracks of note on the album include Rato de Quermesse, O Rap em Ação, and Véia, with him referencing his mother, who died when he was just 7, in the latter track. It was made without any other rapper's participation, but with some tracks produced by A.G. Soares, DJ Caíque, and Projota himself.

Projota began to gain notoriety through these MC battles. As a music producer, Projota produced his own works and works for his friends. With his debut, Projota released the EP Carta aos Meus in 2009; his second work was the mixtape Projeção, released in 2010; this was followed by his second EP, Projeção pra Elas, released in 2010, and by his 4th mixtape, Muita Luz, in 2013. His debut album, recorded with Universal Music, has new tracks and his mixtapes.

At the beginning of 2010, in partnership with DJ Caíque, Projota released "Pelo Amor" online, first on MySpace Brasil. In September 2010, he finished the recording process for his mixtapeProjeção. With 19 tracks, it contains some songs from "Carta aos Meus", along with other already known songs, as well as unreleased ones. Among the unreleased ones are "Projeção", "Samurai" and "Chuva de Novembro". With the online release of the music video for "Muleque Doido" at the end of 2010, Projota announced that there would be, at the beginning of 2011, the release of a new EP, Projeção pra Elas, with an emphasis on romantic tracks. "Muleque Doido" was at the top of trending topics on Brazilian Twitter. Projeção pra Elas was released on 10 February 2011 with 9 new tracks, with both already released and unreleased tracks such as "Guerreira" and "Muleque Doido".

In 2012, he released his first DVD, Realizando Sonhos, recorded at Master Hall in Curitiba on 27 November 2011. The album contains 20 tracks and helped Projota to claim his title as one of the principal representatives of the new school of rap. Muita Luz was his fifth mixtape, recorded independently. It was released on 11 April 2013 and has 19 tracks, with guest appearances from a variety of artists and producers, including Filipe Ret, Drik Barbosa, André Maini, Marlos Vinicius, Skeeter, Laudz, Yago Loyola, Zap San, and DJ Caíque.

=== 2021-present: Big Brother Brasil ===
On 19 January 2021, Projota was confirmed as one of the 20 participants of the 21st season of Big Brother Brasil on TV Globo. He was the 6th contestant to be eliminated on 16 March 2021. He has previously appeared on parties and finals of the program.

== Discography ==
=== Studio albums ===
- (2014) Foco, Força e Fé
- (2017) A Milenar Arte de Meter o Louco
- (2019) Tributo aos Sonhadores I
- (2020) Tempestade Numa Gota D'Água

=== Live albums ===
- (2016) 3Fs ao Vivo
- (2021) AMADMOL ao Vivo

== Filmography ==
=== Television ===
Year	Title	Role	Notas
2018	Carcereiros	Tuinho	Episodes: "Plano de Fuga" and "Uma Questão Pessoal"
2019	Nobody's Looking	Richard	
2021	Big Brother Brasil	Contestant	Season 21

=== Films ===
Year	Title	Role
2018	Sequestro Relâmpago	Daniel

== Tours ==
- Turnê Projeção (2008 - 2012)
- Turnê Muita Luz (2013 - 2014)
- Turnê Foco, Força e Fé (2014 - 2017)
- Turnê A Milenar Arte de Meter o Louco (2017 - present)

== Awards and nominations ==
Year	Award	Category	Nomination	Result
2012	Prêmio Jovem Brasileiro	Cantor Revelação	Himself	Won
2012	Capricho Awards	Revelação Nacional	Himself	Nominated
2012	Meus Prêmios Nick	Revelação Musical	Himself	Nominated
2012	MTV Video Music Brasil	Artista Revelação	Himself	Won
2012	MTV Video Music Brasil	Hit do Ano	"Desci a Ladeira"	Nominated
2012	MTV Video Music Brasil	Artista Masculino	Himself	Nominated
2013	Capricho Awards	Cantor Nacional	Himself	Nominated
2014	MTV Europe Music Awards	Best Brazilian Act	Himself	Nominated
2014	Prêmio Jovem Brasileiro	Melhor cantor	Himself	Won
2014	Meus Prêmios Nick	Música do Ano	"Cobertor" (with Anitta)	Nominated
2014	Retrospectiva UOL	Álbum de Rap Nacional	"Foco, força e fé"	Won
2015	Capricho Awards	Cantor Nacional	Projota	Nominated
2015	Capricho Awards	Hit Nacional	"O Homem que Não tinha nada"	Nominated
2018	MTV Millennial Awards Brasil	Clipe do Ano	"A Milenar Arte de Meter o Louco"	Nominated
2018	MTV Millennial Awards Brasil	Beat BR	"A Milenar Arte de Meter o Louco"	Nominated
