= Laura Rauseo =

Brazilian actress

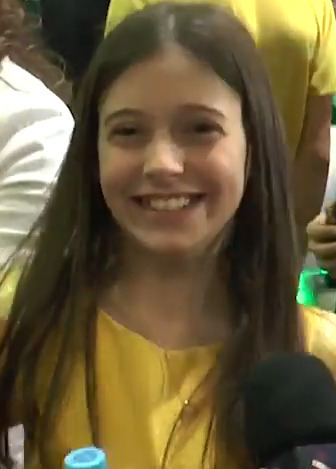
- Rauseo in 2019
- Born: Laura Csch Rauseo; September 17, 2007 (age 19); Santo André, SP, Brazil
- Occupation: Actress
- Years active: 2019–present

Laura Csch Rauseo (born Santo André, September 17, 2007) is a Brazilian actress, known for playing Maggy in the Monica's Gang movies.

== Biography and career ==
Laura Rauseo was born in Santo André, São Paulo, daughter of Juliana Rosa Csch and Marcelo Rauseo, middle sister of Henrique Csch Rauseo and Diego Csch Rauseo.

She began her acting career in the first Monica's Gang feature film, Monica and Friends: Bonds (2019), after her mother enrolled her in the project after seeing a post on social media. Laura was chosen from over 7,500 participants and received praise for her performance, securing the renewal of her contract for the film's sequel, Monica's Gang: Lessons, which premiered in December 2021.

Furthermore, in 2022, she co-starred in Monica's Gang - The Series, produced by Globoplay. The series was a great success on the streaming platform, receiving a positive reception from the public and going viral online.

== Filmography ==
=== Cinema ===
Year	Title	Character
2019	Monica and Friends: Bonds	Maggy
2021	Monica's Gang: Lessons	Maggy
2026	De Tudo Que Poderia Te Deixar	Any

=== Television ===
Year	Title	Character
2022	Monica's Gang - The Series	Maggy

== Awards and nominations ==
=== Contigo! TV Award ===
Year	Category	Nomination	Result
2022	Melhor Atriz Mirim	Monica's Gang - The Series	Nominated
