= Perlimps =

2022 Brazilian animated film

- Brazilian theatrical release poster
- Directed by: Alê Abreu
- Written by: Alê Abreu
- Produced by: Laís Bodanzky; Luiz Bolognesi; Ernesto Soto Canny; Alê Abreu
- Starring: Lorenzo Tarantelli; Giulia Benite; Stênio Garcia; Nill Marcondes; Rosa Rosah
- Edited by: Alê Abreu
- Music by: André Hosoi; O Grivo
- Animation by: Alê Abreu; Sandro Cleuzo
- Production companies: Globo Filmes; Buriti Filmes; Gloob; Sony Pictures International Productions
- Distributed by: Vitrine Filmes (Brazil); Best Friend Forever (International Sales)
- Release dates: June 16, 2022 (France); February 9, 2023 (Brazil)
- Running time: 75 minutes
- Country: Brazil
- Language: Portuguese

Perlimps is a 2022 Brazilian animated adventure fantasy film written, edited, animated and directed by Brazilian filmmaker and character animator Alê Abreu. The film was produced by the Brazilian independent company Buriti Filmes, in co-production with Globo Filmes, Gloob and Sony Pictures International Productions. The film premiered at the 2022 Annecy International Animation Film Festival and has been selected in several international animation festivals, including the Chicago International Children's Film Festival, where it has won the Children's Jury Prize for Best Animated Feature.

== Plot ==
Claé and Bruô, two secret agents working for enemy kingdoms, must join forces to find the Perlimps in order to save the Enchanted Forest from the terrible Giants.

== Cast ==
- Lorenzo Tarantelli as Claé
- Giulia Benite as Bruô
- Stênio Garcia as João-de-Barro
- Nill Marcondes as the Father / Soldier
- Rosa Rosah as the Mother

== Production ==
Perlimps is crafted as a traditional animated film. The 2D animation was hand-drawn by Abreu and a reduced team, including senior Brazilian animator Sandro Cleuzo.

== Awards and nominations ==
Perlimps has been features in a number of international film festivals:

| Year | Award | Award/Category | Status | Ref |
|---|---|---|---|---|
| 2022 | Festival international du film fantastique de Neuchâtel | Best Animated Feature | Nominated | |
| 2022 | New Zealand International Film Festival | Best Animated Feature | Nominated | |
| 2022 | Ottawa International Animation Festival | Best Animated Feature | Nominated | |
| 2022 | International Young Audience Film Festival Ale Kino | Children's Jury's Special Mention | Won | |
| 2022 | Animation is Film | Best Animated Feature | Nominated | |
| 2022 | Bucheon International Animation Festival - BIAF | Korea Animation Industry Association Prize | Won | |
| 2022 | Chicago International Children's Film Festival | Children's Jury Prize for Best Animated Feature | Won | |
| 2022 | Animateka | Best Animated Feature | Nominated | |
| 2023 | Monstra Festival | Best Feature Film - Special Mention | Won | |
| 2023 | Anifilm | Best Feature Film | Nominated | |
| 2023 | Chilemonos International Film Festival | Best Latin American and Spanish Feature Film | Won | |
| 2023 | Animator Film Festival | Best Animated Feature Film | Won | |
| 2023 | Animator Film Festival | Audience Award (Best Feature Film) | Won | |
