= Monica and Friends: Bonds =

2019 film directed by Daniel Rezende

- Theatrical release poster
- Directed by: Daniel Rezende
- Written by: Thiago Dottori
- Based on: Monica's Gang by Mauricio de Sousa; Turma da Mônica – Laços by; Vitor Cafaggi; Lu Cafaggi
- Produced by: Daniel Rezende; Bianca Villar; Fernando Fraiha; Karen Castanho; Charles Miranda; Cássio Pardini; Cao Quintas; Márcio Fraccaroli
- Starring: Giulia Benite; Kevin Vechiatto; Laura Rauseo; Gabriel Moreira
- Cinematography: Azul Serra
- Edited by: Marcelo Junqueira; Sabrina Wilkins
- Music by: Fábio Góes; Tiago Iorc
- Production companies: Paris Entretenimento; Paramount Pictures; Globo Filmes; Biônica Filmes; Quintal Digital; Latina Estúdio; Mauricio de Sousa Produções
- Distributed by: Paris Filmes; Downtown Filmes
- Release date: 27 June 2019
- Running time: 97 minutes
- Country: Brazil
- Language: Portuguese

Monica and Friends: Bonds (Portuguese: Turma da Mônica: Laços) is a 2019 Brazilian family adventure film produced by Estúdios Mauricio de Sousa, directed by Daniel Rezende, with screenplay written by Thiago Dottori, and starring Giulia Benite, Kevin Vechiatto, Laura Rauseo and Gabriel Moreira. The film was based on the eponymous graphic novel by Vitor and Lu Cafaggi and the series of homonymous comic books created by Mauricio de Sousa. The movie was first released in US during the Hollywood Brazilian Film Festival, on 16 November 2019.

== Plot ==
Fluffy, the pet dog of Jimmy Five, disappeared. He develops a plan to rescue the puppy, but for that he will need the help of his faithful friends: Monica, Maggy and Smudge. Together, they will face challenges and live great adventures to take Fluffy back home.

== Cast ==
- Giulia Benite as Monica
- Kevin Vechiatto as Jimmy Five
- Laura Rauseo as Maggy
- Gabriel Moreira as Smudge
- Rodrigo Santoro as Nutty Ned
- Cauã Martins as Bucky
- Sofia Munhoz as Annie
- Gabriel Blotto as Sunny
- Pedro Souza as Jeremiah
- Monica Iozzi as Mrs. Luísa
- Luiz Pacini as Mr. Souza
- Paulo Vilhena as Mr. Five
- Fafá Rennó as Mrs. Five
- Ana Carolina Godoy as Mrs. Lilith
- Beto Schultz as Mr. Paul
- Angélica Paula as Mrs. Lurdes
- Adriano Paixão as Mr. Antenor
- Adriano Bolshi as Lucc (Drifter)
- Ítalo Viana as Tony
- Jasmim Donega as Penha
- Isabella Nakahara as Agnes
- Luiza Istolé as Sofia
- Marcello Costa as Joaquim
- Ahmad Harhash as Jeremy
- Isabela Santos as Gabriela
- Matheus Mahmoud as Ernest
- Kaleb Figueiredo as Robert
- Maurício de Sousa as James (newspaper clerk)

== Production ==
Turma da Mônica - Laços is a graphic novel published in 2013 by Panini Comics as part of the Graphic MSP project, which brings re-reading of the characters of Monica and Friends from the viewpoint of Brazilian artists of various styles. Turma da Mônica - Laços was written and designed by the brothers Vitor and Lu Cafaggi and tells the story of friendship between the children Monica, Jimmy Five, Smudge and Maggy, who live an adventure when they go out looking for Fluffy, Jummy Five's little dog, who had run away from home. The book won the 26.º Troféu HQ Mix in the categories National Special Edition and Children's Publication. In 2015, a continuation was published called Turma da Mônica - Lições and in December of the same year in Comic Con Experience, it was announced the release of a live-action film based on Laços, released on June 27, 2019.

Other characters from the comics have appeared in the form of prints in magazines and paintings, including the twins Cremilda and Clotilde, Bubbly, Tom-Tom, Thunder and Horácio. In the special participations it is possible to see the participation of Sidney Gusman (editor of Mauricio de Sousa Produções), Vitor and Lu Cafaggi (Laços creators) and Mauricio de Souza himself.

The recordings of the feature took place between June and July 2018, in Limeira, Paulínia and Poços de Caldas.

=== Casting ===
The main cast was unveiled on September 29, 2017. Giulia Barreto, Kevin Vecchiato, Gabriel Moreira and Laura Raseo — were chosen to act respectively as Monica, Jimmy Five, Smudge and Maggy on the live-action film adaption — the children thought they were still being evaluated in one step to be officially protagonists of the production. For the final test, the production direction prepared a surprise: a visit from Mauricio de Sousa to announce that they had been chosen for the film. The children's reaction was filmed and later released as a promotional video.

In May 2018, Monica Iozzi joined the cast as Monica's mother Mrs. Luísa. On December 7, 2018, it was announced at the Comic Con Experience convention that Rodrigo Santoro had joined the cast as the character Nutty Ned.

=== Marketing ===
The first trailer for Turma da Mônica: Laços was released on December 18, 2018. An episode of the animated series Monica Toy, titled "Laços de Amizade" and inspired by the film, was released on YouTube on June 19, 2019.

== Reception ==
The film received overwhelmingly positive reviews from Brazilian critics. Review aggregator AdoroCinema assigned a 3,9 stars from 5 from 9 reviews, with a 4,5 out of 5 from a review by the site's personnel. Denis Le Senechal Klimiuc, of Cinema com Rapadura, published a positive review, saying: "Daniel Rezende, in taking responsibility for bringing to the screen characters so dear and inherent to Brazilian culture, his mission was not simply to adapt, but to truly commit himself to transforming the colorful cartoon into a reality minimally credible. The result is enchanting." In a positive review for the CinePOP portal, Janda Montenegro wrote: "The careful work of the team seems to have really devoted special attention to every and any detail that could contribute to the immersion of the universe created by Maurício de Sousa in 1959. [...] It is a film for you to take your children, but also to take mom, dad, auntie and grandma, teachers and friends, after all, everyone grew up watching the adventures of this little gang, so it is good to meet old friends again".

Julia Sabbaga, from Omelete, gave the film a top rating, saying: "The film has a unique rhythm that combines adaptation of comics and children's movie, without losing timing of jokes and following a structure of youth adventure. [...] Finally, Monica Gang's: Bonds marks the national cinema as an exemplary work of technique, charisma, and adaptation of one of our greatest patrimonies". Pedro Antunes, from Rolling Stone Brasil magazine, wrote: "The film has a very contemplative photograph and scenes of silence in the middle of the forest, proposes a breath, at first, after a great marathon that is to mature. The film disguised as a children's film beats the crap out of anyone who finally realizes that life won't run away if you start walking".

Gabrila Zocchi, from Capricho magazine, gave the film a favorable note, saying: "The plot and dialogues, of course, are directed to children, but that doesn't mean that teenagers and adults won't leave the theater touched. It is impossible to watch the film and not remember childhood, remember the moments when you yourself read Monica's and Friends and even associate the story with personal experiences, whether past or present". Praising the performance of the characters, Cesar Soto, from G1, wrote: The biggest flaw in "Bonds" is the reduced participation of Smudge and Maggy. The other pair's constant disputes for leadership diminish their importance and prevent their complexities from really appearing. On the other hand, the fights also yield the best moment of the plot, in which the protagonists abandon their "quadrinesque" personalities and let emerge a real human side".

== Sequel ==
On June 17, 2019, director Daniel Rezende stated that the film would have a sequel, based on the story Monica and Friends: Lessons. Soon after it was announced that the film was already in development and that the release date was October 8, 2020.
