= List of programs broadcast by Cartoon Network (Latin America) =

This article shows a list of programs broadcast by the Latin American channel variant of Cartoon Network.

== Current programming ==
Original programming from Cartoon Network Studios

- Apple & Onion (May 1, 2018)
- Ben 10 (April 10, 2017)
- Clarence (August 4, 2014)
- Craig of the Creek (June 16, 2018)
- Steven Universe (April 7, 2014)
- Summer Camp Island (August 18, 2018)
- Uncle Grandpa (January 2, 2014)
- We Baby Bears (January 2, 2022)
- We Bare Bears (August 24, 2015)

Original programming from Warner Bros. Animation

- Jellystone!
- Looney Tunes Cartoons
- Scooby-Doo and Guess Who? (November 7, 2019)
- Teen Titans Go! (September 2, 2013)
- Tom and Jerry in New York
- Unikitty! (February 12, 2018)
- Animaniacs
- My Adventures with Superman

Original programming from Hanna-Barbera Studios Europe

- The Amazing World of Gumball (September 4, 2011)

Acquired programming

- Barbie: It Takes Two (May 16, 2022)
- Total DramaRama (May 10, 2019)

Local shows

These shows were produced in the countries covered by Cartoon Network Latin America.

- Another Week on Cartoon (May 4, 2015) (exclusive to Uruguay)
- Any Malu Show (May 4, 2020)
- ¡Golpea duro, Hara! (December 15, 2018, in Chile)
- Jorel's Brother (February 2, 2015)
- Juaco vs. Paco (June 7, 2021) (exclusive to Colombia and Venezuela)
- Monica and Friends (June 27, 2004)
- Las Aventuras de Papelucho (September 24, 2021, in Chile)
- Ninjin (September 4, 2019)
- Oswaldo (October 11, 2017)
- The Real World of Any Malu (April 28, 2023)
- The (Sur)real World of Any Malu (March 16, 2019)
- Toontubers (July 23, 2016) (YouTube)
- Turma da Mônica Jovem (November 7, 2019)
- Villainous (October 29, 2021) (Mexico)

Cartoonito shows

- Batwheels
- Bugs Bunny Builders
- Lucas the Spider
- Thomas & Friends: All Engines Go

== See also ==
- List of programs broadcast by Cartoonito (Latin America)
- List of programs broadcast by Discovery Kids (Latin America)
