= Minha Melhor Amiga =

- Directed by: Susana Garcia
- Screenplay by: Patrícia Leme; Luisa Capri; Susana Garcia; Mônica Martelli; Ingrid Guimarães; Tati Bernardi
- Produced by: Marcio Fraccaroli; André Fraccaroli; Veronica Stumpf; Ingrid Guimarães; Mônica Martelli; Susana Garcia
- Starring: Mônica Martelli; Ingrid Guimarães; Giulia Benite; Gabi Amaral; Albano Jerónimo; Gustavo Machado; Michel Melamed; Alejandro Albarracín; Thaila Ayala
- Cinematography: Rodrigo Monte
- Edited by: Leonardo Gouvea
- Music by: Zé Ricardo
- Production company: Paris Entretenimento
- Distributed by: Paris Filmes
- Release date: 3 September 2026
- Country: Brazil
- Language: Portuguese

Minha Melhor Amiga is a 2026 Brazilian comedy film directed by Susana Garcia. It stars Mônica Martelli and Ingrid Guimarães.

== Plot ==
After their respective teenage daughters Manu and Isadora move to Portugal due to an exchange program, middle-aged friends Julia and Clara feel the empty nest syndrome and trip to Portugal too, generating confusion.

== Cast ==
- Mônica Martelli as Julia
- Ingrid Guimarães as Clara
- Giulia Benite as Manu
- Gabi Amaral as Isadora
- Albano Jerónimo
- Gustavo Machado
- Michel Melamed
- Alejandro Albarracín
- Thaila Ayala

== Production ==
The film is a Paris Entretenimento production.

== Release ==
The film was released theatrically in 1,531 Brazilian screens on 3 September 2026. After completing its first weekend of its domestic theatrical window, it had grossed R$11.4 million with 461,800 admissions, finishing the run of Spider-Man: Brand New Day atop the Brazilian box office. It repeated the following week, which had lowered ticket prices nationwide, with bigger numbers of R$14.71 million, and surpassing 2 million admissions.

On 18 September 2026, the film has reached the 3-million-viewer mark, according to the National Cinema Agency (Ancine).

== See also ==
- List of Brazilian films
