= Kevin Vechiatto =

Brazilian actor and comedian

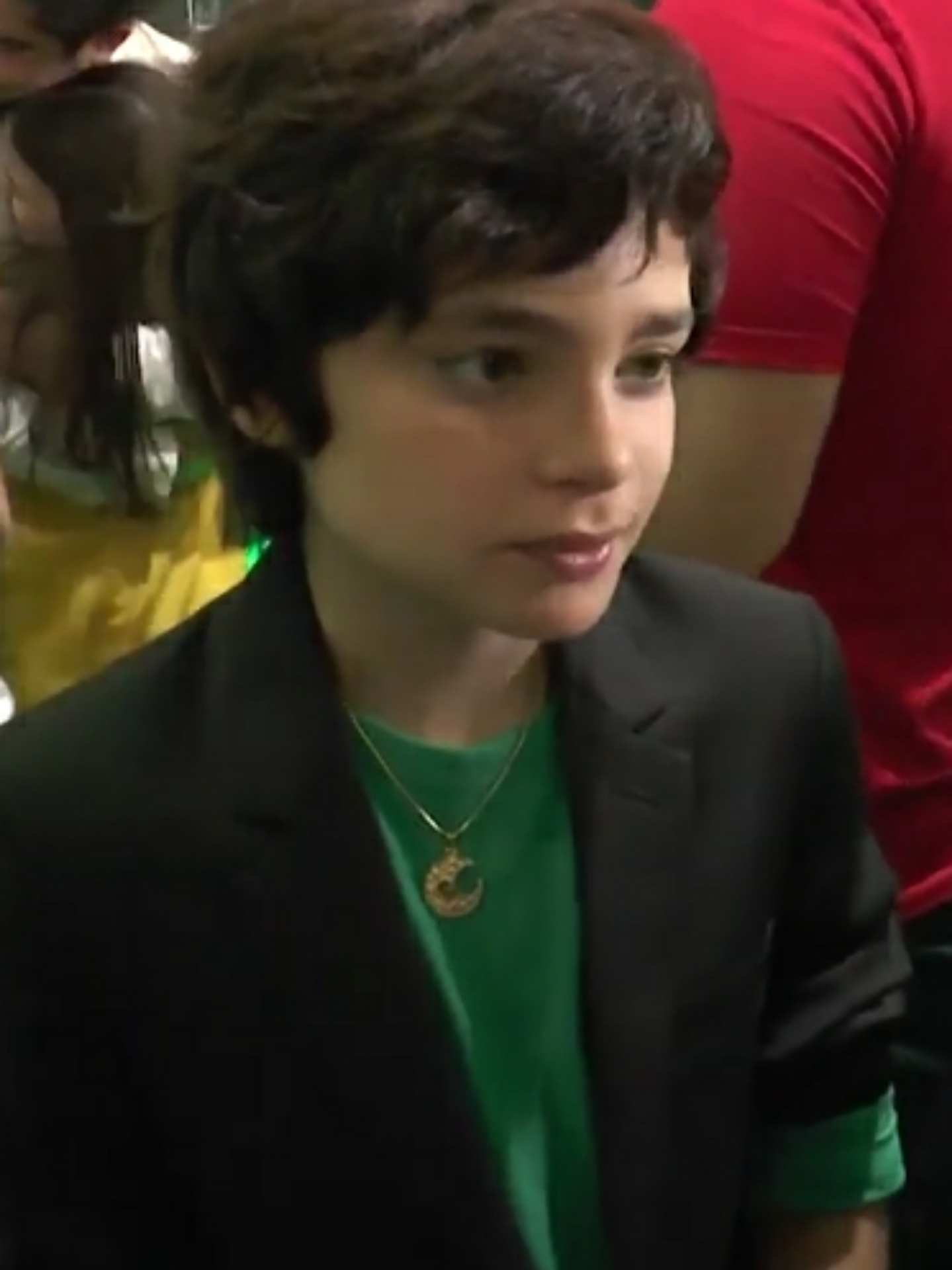
- Vechiatto in 2019
- Born: Kevin Anderson Vechiatto da Silva; 12 July 2006 (age 19); Guarulhos, São Paulo, Brazil
- Occupations: Actor; comedian
- Years active: 2014–present
- Height: 1.70 m (5 ft 7 in)

Kevin Anderson Vechiatto da Silva (born 12 July 2006) is a Brazilian actor, YouTuber and comedian, known for Cúmplices de um Resgate, Monica and Friends: Bonds, and Nobody's Looking.

== Career ==
He started in 2014, in Os Amigos, playing the character Jorge. Then, in 2015, he made his TV debut in Cúmplices de um Resgate as Felipe Vaz, then acted as Nicolau, in the first phase of O Rico e Lázaro. In 2017, he was chosen to play Jimmy Five in Monica and Friends: Bonds.

== Filmography ==
=== Television ===
Year	Title	Role	Notes
2015–2016	Cúmplices de um Resgate	Felipe Vaz	
2017	O Rico e o Lázaro	Nicolau (young)	Episodes: "13–14 of march"
2019	Nobody's Looking	Querubim Angelus	
2020	Boca a Boca	Quim Malta	
2020	Omniscient	Julinho Costa	Episode: "3"
2022	Irmandade	Antônio Gomes	Episode: "Que Nem Lixo"
2022	Turma da Mônica: A Série	Jimmy Five	

=== Film ===
Year	Title	Role	Notes
2014	Os Amigos	Jorge	
2019	A Placa de Rubi: A Chibatada Final	Boy in the playground	Short film
2019	Monica and Friends: Bonds	Cebolácio Menezes da Silva Júnior (Jimmy Five)	
2021	Turma da Mônica: Lições	Cebolácio Menezes da Silva Júnior (Jimmy Five)	
2021	Garota da Moto	Nicolas Souza Sales de Albuquerque (Nico)	
2021	Agentes Nada Secretos	Apocalypso	
2023	Tá Escrito	Inácio	
2024	Empirion: Uma Aventura com Einstein	Zé Coelho	

== Awards and nominations ==
Year	Award	Category	Work nominated	Result
2022	SEC Awards	Best National Actor in a Film	Turma da Mônica: Lições	Nominated
