= Dino Aventuras =

- Genre: Adventure; Children's television series Comedy
- Created by: André Forni
- Directed by: André Forni; André Rocca
- Voices of: Ítalo Luiz; Bianca Alencar; Antonio Moreno; Letícia Celini; Renato Cavalcanti
- Countries of origin: Brazil; France
- Original language: Portuguese
- No. of seasons: 2
- No. of episodes: 52

Production
- Executive producers: Rodrigo Olaio; Flàvio Vonlanten; Janaina Harada Duarte
- Producer: Mariana Andrade
- Running time: 7 minutes
- Production companies: Cinefilm; Danone

Original release
- Network: Disney Junior; Disney Channel
- Release: April 25, 2015 – 2016

Dino Aventuras (lit. 'Dino Adventures') is a 2016-2017 Brazilian computer-animated children's television series created and directed by André Forni, and produced by Cinefilm. The series aired in Brazil on Disney Junior & Disney Channel in 2015. It depicts a group of four children friends, including a dinosaur-child (Dino), travelling on an airship.

== Premise ==
The series follows four main characters Dino, Kika, Lip and Cacau on their hot air balloon ship. Here they met the Little bird. In each episode, Dino, Kika, Lip and Cacau discover things such as books, puzzles and coloring.

== Voice cast and characters ==
=== Main ===
- Dino (voiced by Ítalo Luiz) is a blue and green dinosaur guided by intuition and emotion. He is cheerful, charismatic, intelligent, highly curious, and always seeking new adventures. Dino approaches the world with boundless energy and a playful spirit, often leading the group into exciting and unpredictable situations.
- Kika (voiced by Bianca Alencar) is a beige and pink dinosaur who also enjoys having fun. She is rational and thoughtful, but never tries to spoil the fun. Deep down, she embraces joy and playfulness while acting as the “older sister” of the group, providing guidance and support to the others.
- Cacau (voiced by Letícia Celini) is a purple dinosaur who believes in gnomes and collects rainbows. She is cute, affectionate, and loves to eat. Lip enjoys imagining the magic in the world, and her gentle, imaginative nature brings warmth and wonder to the group’s adventures.
- Lip (voiced by Mariana Zink in the first season and by Renato Cavalcanti in the second season) is a yellow and orange dinosaur, the youngest member of the group. He is energetic, impulsive, and very stubborn, constantly moving and exploring. His adventurous spirit frequently places him and the group in amusing and unexpected situations, adding humor and liveliness to the ensemble.

=== Recurrent ===
- Volante is a stork who works as a messenger. Slightly clumsy, he is responsible for delivering missions to the group.
- Nona (voiced by Alna Ferreira) is a gentle, light-pink dinosaur who resides on Nona Island, where she prepares the most delightful treats for the group.
- Mala Malão (voiced by Mauro Ramos in the first season and by Antônio Moreno in the second season) is an elderly and wise yellow dinosaur who serves almost as a steward of the universe through which Dino and his friends navigate. From atop Lighthouse Island, he ensures that the islands operate in harmony. At first, he may appear grumpy and inflexible, but he is a fair character with a good heart.

== Broadcast ==
In Russia the show aired on channel the Kanal Disney (2015) and Karusel (2016). In Latin America the show aired on the channel Discovery Kids (2016 - 2017) In the Middle East the show aired on the channel Baraem.

== Reception ==
Cardapio.pt noted the pedagogic aspect of the series. The series was said to have been a success.
