= Franklin & Milena on the Quest for Science =

- Genre: Children's television series Science fiction
- Created by: Mauro D'Addio; Maria Shu (S1); Vanessa Fort (S1); Bruno Mota (S1); Renata Diniz (S2–); Issis Valenzuela (S2–)
- Based on: Monica and Friends by Mauricio de Sousa
- Written by: Mauro D'Addio
- Directed by: Mauro D'Addio
- Starring: Fabrício Gabriel; Bia Lisboa; Fábio Lucindo
- Country of origin: Brazil
- Original language: Portuguese
- No. of seasons: 2
- No. of episodes: 16

Production
- Executive producer: Leonardo Mecchi
- Producers: Bianca Villar; Daniel Rezende; Fernando Fralha; Karen Castanho
- Production location: São Paulo
- Running time: 13 minutes
- Production companies: Biônica Filmes; Mauricio de Sousa Produções; Warner Bros. Discovery

Original release
- Network: Max
- Release: February 27, 2024 – present
- Network: Discovery Kids
- Release: February 27, 2024 – present

Franklin & Milena on the Quest for Science (Portuguese: Franjinha & Milena: Em Busca da Ciência) is a Brazilian children's science fiction television series produced by Biônica Filmes and Mauricio de Sousa Produções for the streaming service Max and the Discovery Kids channel, was released on February 27, 2024. It is based on Monica and Friends comic books created by Mauricio de Sousa.

== Synopsis ==
Franklin and Milena, accompanied by their dog Blu, try to uncover the secrets of time travel. But each episode will have their focus diverted from the investigation: first the power goes out and they make a lamp, and deal with an invasion of bees. Then a comet crosses the Solar System, and a flea infestation occurs in Limoeiro. Then they program a robot to make cakes and develop an AI. Finally, they discover a prehistoric fossil, and Franklin loses sleep trying to decipher the mysteries of time. Science emerges as the answer to each adventure, and together they learn and become best friends and scientists, discovering that true time travel is science itself!

== Production ==
On July 6, 2022, HBO Max (currently Max) announced the start of recording for the series, which was originally co-produced by Cartoon Network Brazil until it ended in September 2022.

On December 2 of the same year, scenes from the series were released during the participation in the Thunder by Cinemark Club Stage at CCXP22, and the release is scheduled for 2023.

On February 15, 2024, due to the merger of WarnerMedia and Discovery Inc., Max released the official trailer for the series and the premiere date of February 27 for its platform and on Discovery+, and also on the Discovery Kids channel.

On June 24 of the same year, a trailer was released, announcing that the second season will premiere on July 8.

== Cast ==
=== Main ===
- Fabrício Gabriel as Franjinha (Franklin)
- Bia Lisboa as Milena
- Fábio Lucindo as Bidu (Blu; voice)

=== Recurring ===
- Stephany Kim as Marina and Ji Ae Lee
- Johnny O'Donnell as Franjão (Franklin Adult)
- Rafael Pereira as Dudu (Junior)
- Luana Miyliki as Soo Min Lee
- Miguel Lucca Britto as Aldino
- Cauà Trindade as Eugênio
- Gustavo Saulle as Jefinho
- Mauricio de Sousa as Himself (special participation)

== Episodes ==
=== Series overview ===
Series overview
Season	Episodes	Originally released
1	8	February 27, 2024
2	8	July 8, 2024

=== Season 1 ===
No. overall	No. in season	Brazilian Portuguese title	Original release date	Discovery Kids air date
1	1	"De Volta para o Escuro"	February 27, 2024	February 27, 2024
2	2	"O Fim da Picada"	February 27, 2024	February 28, 2024
3	3	"Uma Odisseia no Quintal"	February 27, 2024	February 29, 2024
4	4	"A Candemia"	February 27, 2024	March 1, 2024
5	5	"Bolo de Robô"	February 27, 2024	March 4, 2024
6	6	"Doidos por Dados"	February 27, 2024	March 5, 2024
7	7	"Os Segredos das Pedras"	February 27, 2024	March 6, 2024
8	8	"A Viagem"	February 27, 2024	March 7, 2024

=== Season 2 ===
No. overall	No. in season	Brazilian Portuguese title	Original release date	Discovery Kids air date
9	1	"A Marciana"	July 8, 2024	July 8, 2024
10	2	"Sopa Primordial"	July 8, 2024	July 9, 2024
11	3	"Bidusfera"	July 8, 2024	July 10, 2024
12	4	"As Joanautas"	July 8, 2024	July 11, 2024
13	5	"Secos e Molhados"	July 8, 2024	July 12, 2024
14	6	"Quem Soltou Gases?"	July 8, 2024	July 15, 2024
15	7	"A verdade está lá dentro"	July 8, 2024	July 16, 2024
16	8	"Planeta Água"	July 8, 2024	July 17, 2024

== Awards ==
Year	Award	Category	Nominee(s)	Result	Ref.
2025	Rose d'Or	Kids	Franjinha & Milena: Em Busca da Ciência	Nominated	
