= Mauro Ramos (voice actor) =

Brazilian voice actor (born 1961)

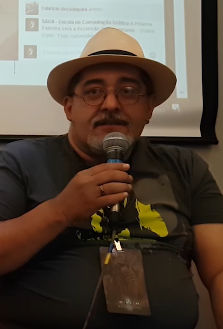
- Mauro Ramos during a lecture.
- Born: February 13, 1961 (age 65); Rio de Janeiro, Brazil
- Occupations: actor; voice actor; radio host; writer; singer; narrator
- Years active: 1979–present
- Height: 1.73 m (5 ft 8 in)

Mauro Ramos (Brazilian Portuguese pronunciation: [ˈmawɾu ˈʁɐmus]; born 13 February 1961) is a Brazilian actor, voice actor, radio host, writer, singer and narrator.

== Biography ==
Before beginning his voice acting career, he worked as a radio announcer on the long-running program Patrulha da Cidade at Rádio Tupi in Rio de Janeiro.

He began his voice acting career on 15 March 1989, after being recommended by radio actress Cordélia Santos to Mário Monjardim for an audition. He was hired based solely on a voice test, without having taken any formal training.

His first regular voice acting role in animation was replacing Márcio Simões in a character from COPS. His first leading role in a feature film was in A Mulher do Chefe, replacing Hélio Ribeiro, who was unavailable at the time. He is known for voicing characters in the Brazilian Portuguese versions of animated films, including Pumba in The Lion King, Shrek (replacing Bussunda), and James P. "Sulley" Sullivan in Monsters, Inc. He is also well known for being the Brazilian voice of actors such as Geoffrey Rush, Forest Whitaker, John Goodman, Ruben Aguirre, Gary Oldman, Jean Reno, Brendan Gleeson, Martin Sheen, Rip Torn, Kevin Pollak, Bob Hoskins, Ray Winstone, Gérard Depardieu, Kevin Dunn, Wayne Knight, Danny DeVito, and Keith David.

Other characters voiced by Mauro Ramos include Aku in Samurai Jack, Larry 3000 in Time Squad, Buzz Buzzard in The New Woody Woodpecker Show, Hector Con Carne in Evil Con Carne, and Husk in Hazbin Hotel, in addition to providing the Brazilian Portuguese voices for actors such as John Cleese, Jon Lovitz, Christopher Lloyd, among others.

He also provided the singing voice of Lumière, the candlestick, in the Brazilian Portuguese dub of Disney's classic Beauty and the Beast.

On television, he became known as the original voice of Quindim in Sítio do Pica-Pau Amarelo and MC Iscavoka in TV Globinho on Rede Globo.

== Awards and nominations ==
Award	Year	Recipient(s) and nominee(s)	Category	Result	Ref.
Prêmio Yamato	2008	Shrek, in Shrek the Third	Melhor Dublador de Protagonista (Best Lead Voice Actor)	Nominated	
Prêmio Yamato	2011	Shrek, in Shrek Forever After	Melhor Dublador de Protagonista (Best Lead Voice Actor)	Nominated	
Prêmio Yamato	2011	Taurus Aldebaran, in Saint Seiya: The Lost Canvas	Melhor Dublador de Anime (Best Anime Voice Actor)	Nominated	

== Career ==
=== Voice acting ===
^a Redubbing of the Brazilian Portuguese version.

==== Animations ====
List of animated characters dubbed by Mauro Ramos in Brazilian Portuguese
Role	Apparitions	Ref.
Argos Bleak	Captain Planet and the Planeteers	
Doyle's locker	Galaxy High School	
Pumba	The Lion King, The Lion King II: Simba's Pride, The Lion King 1½, House of Mouse, Timon & Pumbaa and The Lion Guard	
Thing	The Incredible Hulk	
Buzz Buzzard	The New Woody Woodpecker Show	
Four	Seven Little Monsters	
James P. Sullivan	Monsters, Inc. and Monsters University	
Aku	Samurai Jack	
Lumière	Beauty and the Beast^{a}	
Soto	Ice Age	
Boog	Open Season and Open Season 2	
Pig	Barnyard	
Shrek (Note: Replacing the comedian Bussunda, who passed away in 2006.)	Shrek the Third, Shrek Forever After, Shrek the Halls, Shrek 4-D, Mad and Donkey's Christmas Shrektacular	
Bowler Hat Guy	Meet the Robinsons	
General Grievous	Star Wars: The Clone Wars	
Louis	The Princess and the Frog	
The Cat	Coraline	
Taurus Aldebaran	Saint Seiya: The Lost Canvas	
Cheshire	Alice in Wonderland and Alice Through the Looking Glass	
Hook Hand Thug	Tangled	
Pedro	Rio and Rio 2	
Narrator Smurf	The Smurfs and The Smurfs 2	
Kilowog	Green Lantern: The Animated Series	
Frank	Hotel Transylvania, Hotel Transylvania 2, Hotel Transylvania 3: Summer Vacation and Hotel Transylvania: Transformania	
Carl	Aqua Teen Hunger Force	
Silas Ramsbottom	Despicable Me 2, Despicable Me 3 and Despicable Me 4	
Gavin	Ice Age: Collision Course	
Husk	Hazbin Hotel	

==== Actors ====
List of actors and roles dubbed in Brazilian Portuguese by Mauro Ramos
Actor	Role	Apparitions	Ref.
Christopher Lloyd	Emmett Brown	Back to the Future^{a}	
Vito D'Ambrosio	Tony Bellows	The Flash (1990)	
Eriq La Salle	Dr. Peter Benton	ER	
Martin Lawrence	Marcus Burnett	Bad Boys^{a}, Bad Boys II and Bad Boys for Life	
Frankie Faison	Elliott Gordon	White Chicks	
Terry O'Quinn	John Locke	Lost	
Jesse L. Martin	Joe West	The Flash (2014)	
Rubén Aguirre (Note: In addition to Professor Girafales, Ramos voiced the other characters originally performed by Ruben Aguirre in El Chavo del Ocho and El Chapulín Colorado (dubbing by Som de Vera Cruz for the previously unaired episodes on Multishow), replacing the late Osmiro Campos.)	Professor Girafales	El Chavo del Ocho	

=== Original voice ===
Role	Apparitions
Quindim	Sítio do Pica-Pau Amarelo
MC Iscavoka	TV Globinho

== Discography ==
=== Soundtrack appearances ===
List of soundtrack appearances featuring vocals by Mauro Ramos
Title	Year	Album	Ref.
"Um Sonho Eu Tenho" (as Hook Hand Thug, with Renato Rabello as Big Nose Thug, Sylvia Salustti as Rapunzel and Raphael Rossatto as Flynn Rider)	2010	Enrolados (Trilha Sonora Original) (Note: Brazilian Portuguese version of the soundtrack from Tangled.)	
"Humano Outra Vez" (as Lumière, with Isaac Schneider as Cogsworth, Miriam Peracchi as Mrs. Potts and Geisa Vidal as Wardrobe)	2012	A Bela e a Fera (Note: Brazilian Portuguese version of the soundtrack from Beauty and the Beast (1991).)	
