= PinGuim Content =

Brazilian animation studio

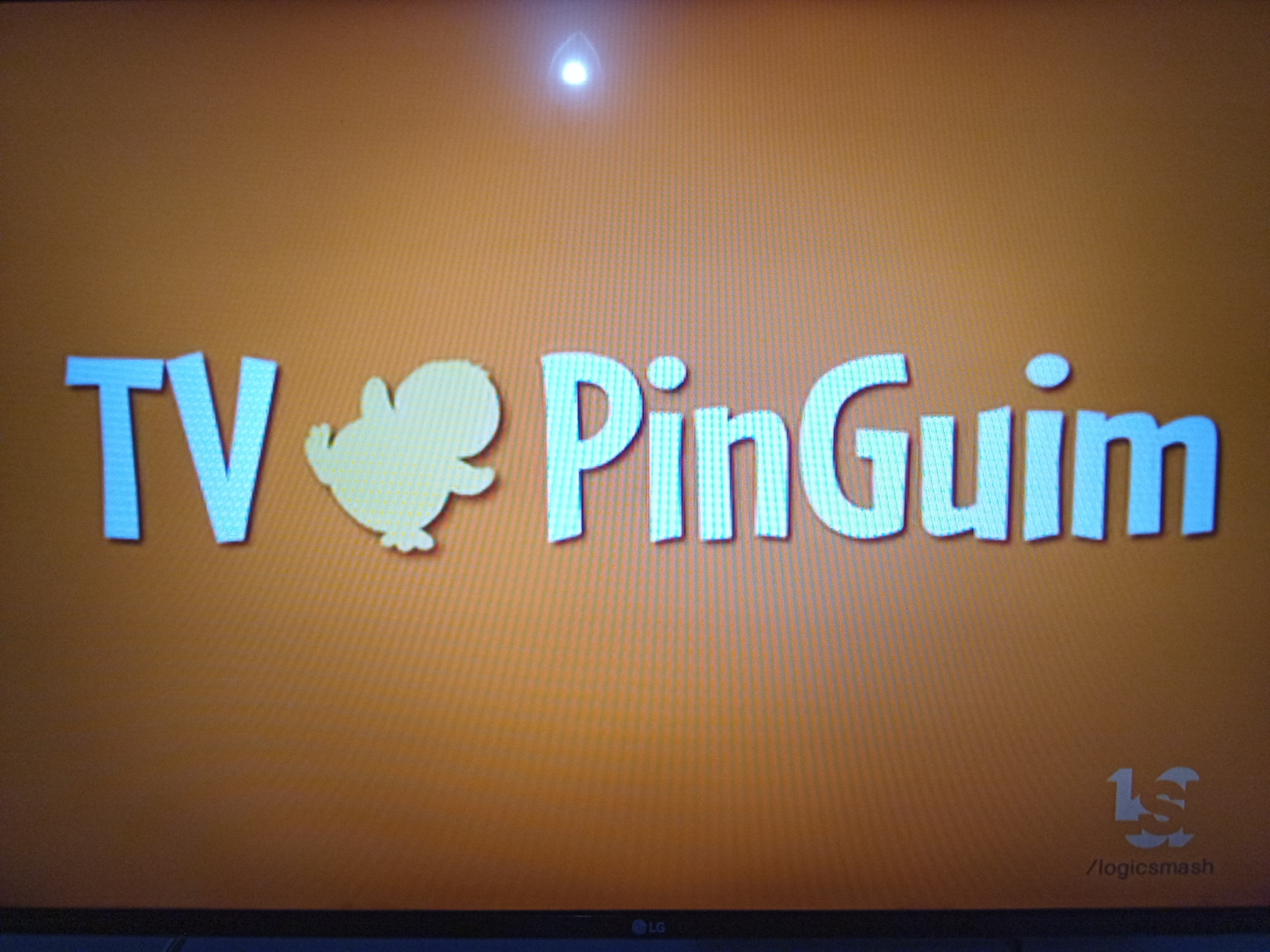
- Formerly: TV PinGuim
- Type: Entertainment
- Industry: Animation
- Founded: 1989
- Founders: Kiko Mistrorigo, Célia Catunda
- Headquarters: São Paulo, Brazil
- Products: Television programs and Theatrical feature films

PinGuim Content is a Brazilian animation studio founded in 1989 by Kiko Mistrorigo and Célia Catunda.

The company is known for the creation and development of original targeted educational cartoons for children, making animation in 2D, 3D and stop-motion. The company began its career developing shorts for educational channels like TV Cultura, TV Escola and Canal Futura.

The company was previously known as TV PinGuim.

== Notable creations ==
- Fishtronaut
- Earth to Luna
- Charlie, the Interviewer of Things
- Ping and Friends
- Gemini 8
- Tarsilinha
- Eu e Meu Avô Nihonjin
