= Maggy (Monica and Friends) =

- Monica's Gang's character
- Maggy 7 years in Monica's Gang (top) and Maggy 15 years in Monica Adventures (bottom)
- First appearance: Removable Newspaper strips of 1964
- Created by: Maurício de Sousa
- Portrayed by: Laura Rauseo (Monica and Friends: Bonds)
- Voiced by: Elza Gonçalves; Bianca Alencar (Turma da Mônica Jovem); Lissa Grossman (English Dub)

In-universe information
- Full name: Magali Fernandes de Lima
- Species: Human
- Gender: Female
- Family: Mrs. Lili (mother), Mr. Paulinho Lima (father), Vanilla (pet cat), Toddy (boyfriend)

Maggy, known as Magali in Portuguese, is a character of the popular Brazilian comic book series Monica and Friends. She was created by Mauricio de Sousa, who based the character on one of his daughters, Magali Spada e Souza. Monica, Mary Angela (Jimmy's sister) and Marina were also based on Mauricio's daughters. Maggy has her own comic book, in which there are also stories of her cat, Vanilla.

She received her own comic book in 1989 and is being published uninterruptedly since then.

== Characteristics ==
Maggy is seven years old, although in older stories she was described being six. Her most notable feature is her voracious appetite. She eats nearly everything she sees, usually at high speed, and claims to be hungry anytime, even after eating. Her stories are always centered on food, or at least have her appetite as a recurring gag. Despite this, she never gains weight (a fact which makes Monica intrigued). Her favorite food is watermelon - just like the real-life Magali.

Maggy is Monica's best friend, and one of the few characters that Monica never beats, except sometimes when Maggy accidentally is punished, as when Monica throws her rabbit toy, Samson, but misses the target and hits Maggy. She wears only a yellow dress and, like Monica and Smudge, she walks barefoot, exposing her feet, which have no toes. In the 399th edition, it is shown that Maggy is left-handed.

== Related characters ==
- Eliana Lima (Ms. Lili) – Maggy's mother. She is concerned about Maggy's appetite and often complains about the amount of food she has to prepare to satisfy her daughter. Her mother is called 'Gertrudes'.
- Paulo Lima (Mr. Paulinho) – Mr. Paulinho, sometimes known as Carlito, is Maggy's father. He is regularly seen attempting to get rid of Vanilla, whom he dislikes since he is allergic to cats. His mother is called 'Cota'. He is the brother of Cecília, who is Junior's mother.
- Eduardo de Lima Guimarães Pereira (Junior) (Dudu) — Junior is Maggy's five-year-old cousin. The opposite of Maggy, he hates eating, even though in some stories he ends eating the meal against his will. For his luck (and for Maggy's), she's often around to help him to eat the meal his mother cooked for him. Beyond that, Junior is always willing to play with the older kids, but they usually avoid playing with him due to his age. Junior is afraid of cats, especially Vanilla, though in later stories he seems to be adapting to the cat (such as the time he pet-sitted for Maggy while she went to the beach). In his solo stories he is often pictured having imaginary adventures (often dealing with anthropomorphic food).
- Cecília & Durval – Juniors’ parents. They constantly try to make their son eat in many ways, even though most of these attempts end up unsuccessful.
- Aunt Nina (Tia Nena) – She is Maggy's aunt. Nina owns a candy shop, but in some stories, she owns a restaurant. Nina cooks a lot for Maggy. Besides from cooking, she is a witch and enjoys spending time with magic.
- Vanilla (Mingau) – Maggy's pet cat. Everyone likes him, except for Maggy's boyfriend, because he is allergic to cat hair. In his first story, it says he used to be a street cat, but was adopted by Maggy. He is curious, active and enjoys sleeping, eating, exploring and hunting small prey that appear in its house (mainly mice, cockroaches, flies, and the occasional gecko. Vanilla speaks mainly through thought bubbles, his stories being sometimes monologues. He is usually seen speaking through speech bubbles when interacting with another animal, where it is assumed they are speaking in a language humans can't understand. He usually doesn't get along with the canine members of the neighborhood, though sometimes they mutually agree to tolerate each other. Initially, he didn't have a name. However, through a national survey announced on a comic strip, Maggy asked her readers to suggest names for her cat. The winner would be given a real Persian cat (which is stated to be Vanilla's breed. Mingau, which means "porridge" in Portuguese, was chosen by various readers. In the story in which the name was announced, Captain Fray appears and kidnaps Vanilla, stating that he is furious because his name ("Cafifonho" – a nonsense name in Portuguese alluding to the word "fofo" for fluffy/cuddly) wasn't chosen, only to learn he's also allergic to cats. He has recently gained his own comic book series (Mingau e Bidu, "Vanilla and Blu"), which he shares with Blu.
- The Six Cats – Vanilla's siblings that appear very rarely. The first story of 1994 tells the fate of each kitten, all born in the same litter: Matthew, the adventurer, has become the cat of a fishing boat; Nestor, the bohemian, has become a feral cat; Tita, the worker, has become a farm hunter cat; Lily, the spoiled one, has become a rich lady’s cat; Percival, the quirky one, has become a witch's cat; Makoto the smart, has become fishmonger's cat; and Vanilla has gone to Maggy's house.
- Toddy (Quinzinho) – He's from Portuguese descent, son of the owner of a local bakery. He's in love with Maggy, and makes everything for her: bread, cake, and other food, even though she eats everything without paying. Sometimes, Quinzinho questions whether Maggy likes him or his food. Quinzinho's real name is 'Joaquim'. Quinzinho is his nickname because it's a diminutive form of Joaquim. Before Toddy’s first appearance, Maggy was occasionally paired with Smudge as a couple.

== Comic Book ==
Cover of Magali (Maggy)'s first comic book cover (February 1989)

The character gained her solo comic book series in February 1989, two years after Mauricio de Sousa's characters migrated from Abril to Globo, marking this as the first new title of a Mauricio character to debut at the new publisher and since then being sold alongside the titles Mônica, Cebolinha, Cascão and Chico Bento. Before that, between November and December 1988, a mini-arc of 3 stories was published in the comics of the other four characters, showing the character protesting to have her own comic book, even refusing to continue eating. Much of the comic's stories were created by artist Rosana Munhoz, who had the character as her favorite and was responsible for introducing new characters, including Toddy, Vanilla, Junior, Aunt Nina and Denise. Also in December 1989, an almanac entitled "Almanaque da Magali" debuted, republishing stories focused on the character.

Just like the comics featuring the characters Smudge and Chuck Billy, this title was also sold biweekly, however in March 2003 the comics began to be sold monthly, having finished to be published at Globo in 2006, totaling 403 issues. Currently both the main series and its almanac are published by Panini Comics since 2007.

The series has been among the best-selling comics in Brazil for years, between 2023 and 2024 it was listed as the 5th best-selling comic in the country surpassing many foreign comics.

== Reception and legacy ==
In 2023 a Graphic Novel focused only on Maggy entitled "Magali: Receita" was published, having been made by the artist Carol Rossetti.
