= Ping and Friends =

- Also known as: Ping and Pong
- Created by: Celia Catunda; Kiko Mistrorigo
- Developed by: Annick De Vries; Celia Catunda; Kiko Mistrorigo; Ernest Godin; Gerard Lewis; Dominic Webber; Anne-Marie Perrotta
- Written by: Anne-Marie Perrotta; Gerard Lewis; Dominic Webber; Rita Catunda; Camilla Helms
- Directed by: Celia Catunda; Kiko Mistrorigo; Annick De Vries
- Voices of: Holly Gauthier-Frankel; Sonja Ball; Thor Bishopric
- Theme music composer: Fabio Tagliaferri
- Opening theme: "Ping and Friends Theme" performed by Holly Gauthier-Frankel
- Ending theme: "Ping and Friends Theme" (instrumental)
- Composers: Gerard Lewis; Dominic Webber; Mario Sévigny
- Countries of origin: Brazil; Canada
- Original languages: Portuguese; English
- No. of episodes: 52

Production
- Executive producers: Ricardo Rozzino; Ernest Godin
- Producers: Celia Catunda; Kiko Mistrorigo; Annick De Vries
- Editor: Loïc Bruderlein
- Running time: 7 minutes
- Production companies: TV PinGuim; Kondolole Films

Original release
- Network: TVOKids/Télé-Québec/TFO/Knowledge (Canada); Discovery Kids (Brazil)
- Release: November 12, 2018 – August 5, 2019

Ping and Friends is an animated musical children's television series created by Celia Catunda and Kiko Mistrorigo. Produced by TV PinGuim and Kondolole Films, the series premiered on November 12, 2018 on TVOKids in Canada, and on November 19 on Discovery Kids in Brazil.

== Plot ==
Ping and Friends follows two best friends; Ping, a bird, and Pong, a dog, a duo who love music. With their friends Mr. Prickles, Matilda and Trix06, they always find a reason to create a new song in Melody Meadows. For Ping and Pong, the answer to everything is music.

== Characters ==
- Ping, a small yellow canary
- Pong, an insightful orange beagle
- Matilda, an Egyptian Mau cat who loves dancing.
- Mr. Prickles, a neurotic hedgehog
- Trix06, Ping and Pong's robot assistant

== Episodes ==
No.	Title	Written by	Storyboard by	Canadian air date	Brazilian air date	Prod. code
1	"Shleepy Lullabye"	Anne-Marie Perrotta	Ricardo Sasaki, Welton Santos & Rodrigo Eba	November 12, 2018	TBA	101
2	"Rainy Day Blues"	Anne-Marie Perrotta	Rodriga Eba	November 14, 2018	TBA	102
3	"Birthday Beat"	Anne-Marie Perrotta	André Barion	November 19, 2018	TBA	103
4	"From Kickups to Samba"	Rita Catunda	Welton Santos	November 21, 2018	TBA	104
5	"A Hula of a Story"	Anne-Marie Perrotta	André Barion	November 26, 2018	TBA	105
6	"Homemade Bluegrass"	Camille Helms	Iara Catunda	November 28, 2018	TBA	106
7	"Ding Dong Song"	Anne-Marie Perrotta	Livia Amaral Santos	December 3, 2018	TBA	107
8	"The Seal Rhythm"	Anne-Marie Perrotta	Vagner Farias	December 5, 2018	TBA	108
9	"A Puzzle of a Melody"	Anne-Marie Perrotta	Iara Catunda	December 10, 2018	TBA	109
10	"Square Dance"	Anne-Marie Perrotta	Kico	December 12, 2018	TBA	110
11	"Positive Vibrations"	Rita Catunda	Livia Amaral Santos	December 17, 2018	TBA	111
12	"Moving Along"	Camille Helms	Livia Amaral Santos	December 19, 2018	TBA	112
13	"Little Pong Peep"	Anne-Marie Perrotta	Iara Catunda	December 24, 2018	TBA	113
14	"Give It All Away"	Camille Helms	Livia Amaral Santos	December 24, 2018	TBA	122
15	"Fiesta Fiesta"	Anne-Marie Perrotta	Welton Santos	December 26, 2018	TBA	114
16	"The Jamming Jam"	Anne-Marie Perrotta	Livia Amaral Santos & André Barion	January 7, 2019	TBA	115
17	"Rainbow Umbrellas"	Rita Catunda	Livia Amaral Santos	January 9, 2019	TBA	116
18	"One Stormy Day"	Anne-Marie Perrotta	Livia Amaral Santos	January 14, 2019	TBA	117
19	"The Big Audition"	Camille Helms	Gabriel Sao Marcos	January 16, 2019	TBA	118
20	"A Day at the Beach"	Rita Catunda	Iara Catunda	January 21, 2019	TBA	119
21	"Less is More"	Anne-Marie Perrotta	Welton Santos	January 23, 2019	TBA	120
22	"Busy Bees"	Anne-Marie Perrotta	Livia Amaral Santos	January 28, 2019	TBA	121
23	"The Bagpiper"	Anne-Marie Perrotta	Gabriel Sao Marcos	February 4, 2019	TBA	123
24	"Snail Mail's Song"	Rita Catunda	Livia Amaral Santos	February 6, 2019	TBA	124
25	"Pop Goes the World"	Gerard Lewis & Dominic Webber	Vagner Farias	February 16, 2019	TBA	125
26	"Go Loud and Soft"	Gerard Lewis & Dominic Webber	Kico	February 17, 2019	TBA	126
27	"Silent Ping"	Gerard Lewis & Dominic Webber	Kico	May 6, 2019	TBA	127
28	"Chinese New Year"	Gerard Lewis & Dominic Webber	Welton Santos	May 8, 2019	TBA	128
29	"Digeridoo"	Gerard Lewis & Dominic Webber	Livia Amaral Santos	May 13, 2019	TBA	129
30	"Opera-Co-Opera"	Gerard Lewis & Dominic Webber	Welton Santos	May 15, 2019	TBA	130
31	"Musical Painting"	Gerard Lewis & Dominic Webber	Welton Santos	May 21, 2019	TBA	137
32	"Moon Flower"	Gerard Lewis & Dominic Webber	Livia Amaral Santos	May 22, 2019	TBA	138
33	"Clowning Around"	Gerard Lewis & Dominic Webber	Iara Catunda	May 22, 2019	TBA	131
34	"African Story Time"	Gerard Lewis & Dominic Webber	Kico	May 23, 2019	TBA	139
35	"Dance of the Zils"	Gerard Lewis & Dominic Webber	Alex Osni	May 24, 2019	TBA	140
36	"Prickle's Quartet"	Gerard Lewis & Dominic Webber	Alex Osni	May 27, 2019	TBA	141
37	"Marching Band"	Gerard Lewis & Dominic Webber	Livia Amaral Santos	May 27, 2019	TBA	132
38	"The Big Sheep Wedding"	Gerard Lewis & Dominic Webber	Danielly Romero	May 28, 2019	TBA	142
39	"The Camping Trip"	Gerard Lewis & Dominic Webber	Welton Santos	May 29, 2019	TBA	143
40	"Ice Sculpture"	Gerard Lewis & Dominic Webber	Welton Santos	May 29, 2019	TBA	133
41	"Music School"	Gerard Lewis & Dominic Webber	Alex Osni	May 30, 2019	TBA	144
42	"Caterpillar Song"	Gerard Lewis & Dominic Webber	Alex Osni	May 31, 2019	TBA	145
43	"Snow Day"	Gerard Lewis & Dominic Webber	Kico	June 3, 2019	TBA	134
44	"Movie Music Magic"	Gerard Lewis & Dominic Webber	Welton Santos	June 5, 2019	TBA	135
45	"Garden Party Idol"	Gerard Lewis & Dominic Webber	Gabriel Sao Marcos	June 10, 2019	TBA	136
46	"Welcome Djembe"	Anne-Marie Perrotta	Kico	June 29, 2019	TBA	148
47	"Spring Orchestra" "Maestro Prickles"	Anne-Marie Perrotta	Iara Catunda	July 15, 2019	TBA	146
48	"The Singing Ant"	Anne-Marie Perrotta	Ricardo Sasaki, Rodrigo Eba & Welton Santos	July 17, 2019	TBA	147
49	"Dance Dance Dance"	Anne-Marie Perrotta	Livia Amaral Santos	July 24, 2019	TBA	149
50	"For the Love of Triangle"	Anne-Marie Perrotta	Welton Santos	July 29, 2019	TBA	150
51	"One Two Three" "Music Box"	Anne-Marie Perrotta	Livia Amarl Santos	July 31, 2019	TBA	151
52	"Keytar"	Anne-Marie Perrotta	Welton Santos	August 5, 2019	TBA	152

== Broadcast ==
Ping and Friends had its world debut in Canada on November 12, 2018 on TVOKids. The series then premiered on Knowledge Kids on January 16, 2019. In Quebec, the series premiered on Télé-Québec on February 25, and on May 27, 2019 on TFO. In Brazil, the series premiered on Discovery Kids on November 19, 2018. In the rest of Latin America, the series premiered on the same channel on February 26, 2019.

In the United States, 13 episodes of the series are available on Amazon Prime and airing on Vme Kids.

== Other media ==
An app based on the series, "Music with Ping and Friends" was released on the iTunes store, as well as Google Play. The game offers three educational musical activities.
