= Earth to Luna! =

Brazilian animated television series

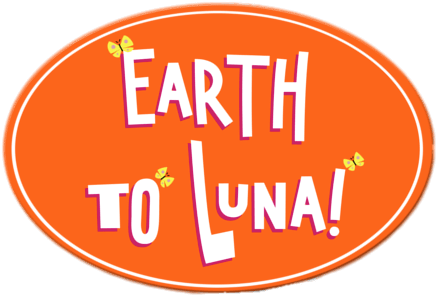
- Also known as: El Mundo de Luna O Show da Luna!
- Genre: Educational; Musical; Comedy
- Created by: Célia Catunda; Kiko Mistrorigo
- Directed by: Célia Catunda; Kiko Mistrorigo; Rita Catunda (season 8)
- Countries of origin: Brazil; United States (seasons 1–2)
- Original language: Brazilian Portuguese
- No. of seasons: 9
- No. of episodes: 234

Production
- Executive producer: Ricardo Rozzino
- Running time: 11 minutes
- Production companies: PinGuim Content; Little Airplane Productions (seasons 1–2)

Original release
- Network: Discovery Kids (Latin America); Sprout/NBC (seasons 1–2) (U.S.); Kids Street (seasons 3–8) (U.S.)
- Release: August 16, 2014 – October 23, 2023

Earth to Luna! (Neutral Spanish: El Mundo de Luna!) (Brazilian Portuguese: O Show da Luna!) is an animated children's television series. It was created and directed by Célia Catunda and Kiko Mistrorigo and produced by PinGuim Content and Little Airplane Productions (seasons 1–2) in association with Discovery Kids.

It debuted on the American channel Sprout, on August 16, 2014. In Latin America, it debuted on October 13, 2014, on Discovery Kids. Each season consists of 26 episodes (11 minutes per episode). The target audience is children between the ages of four and nine years old.

== Summary ==
The series shows the adventures of a 6-year-old girl named Luna (voiced by Angelina Carballo (Note: Nicole Apolonio, in seasons 4 and 5) and singing voice by Hannah Strawn), who is fascinated with science, her little brother Jupiter (who's named after the planet Jupiter) (voiced by Raul-Gomez Pina (Note: Crystal Lopez, starting in the last episodes of season 7)) and their pet ferret Clyde (voiced by Eric Anderson (Note: Travis Roig, starting in season 4)).

== Voice cast ==
- Angelina Carballo as Luna (season 1, season 2 episodes 1-8; seasons 5–7)
- Alexya Aliva as Luna (season 2 episodes 9-26)
- Nicole Apollonio as Luna (seasons 3–4)
- Debbie Murillo as Luna (season 8)
- Hannah Strawn as Luna (singing voice, season 1)
- Raul-Gomez Pina as Jupiter (seasons 1–6)
- Crystal Lopez as Jupiter (seasons 7–8)
- Eric Anderson as Clyde (seasons 1–3)
- Travis Roig as Clyde (seasons 4–7)
- Christian Vandepas as Clyde (season 8)

Dubbing Studio:

- The Kitchen, Miami (seasons 1–6)
- Universal Cinergía, Miami (seasons 7–8)

== Episodes ==
=== Season 1 (2014) ===
No.	Title	Written by	Directed by	Original air date	U.S. air date	Prod. code
1	"The Waggle Dance"	Marcela Catunda	Célia Catunda & Kiko Mistrorigo	October 13, 2014	August 19, 2014	101
2	"When Yellow Met Blue"	Marcela Catunda	Célia Catunda & Kiko Mistrorigo	October 13, 2014	August 16, 2014	102
3	"Banana Seeds?"	Marcela Catunda; Angelo Franchini	Célia Catunda & Kiko Mistrorigo	October 14, 2014	August 20, 2014	103
4	"Twinkle Twinkle Little Star?"	Marcela Catunda; Patricia Black	Célia Catunda & Kiko Mistrorigo	October 14, 2014	August 17, 2014	104
5	"On the Rings of Saturn"	Marcela Catunda	Célia Catunda & Kiko Mistrorigo	October 15, 2014	August 21, 2014	105
6	"The Tale of Kale"	Marcela Catunda; Patricia Black	Célia Catunda and Kiko Mistrorigo	October 15, 2014	August 23, 2014	106
7	"That Just Rained Smell"	Marcela Catunda	Célia Catunda & Kiko Mistrorigo	October 16, 2014	August 24, 2014	107
8	"How Water Became Rain?"	Angelo Franchini; Marcela Catunda	Célia Catunda & Kiko Mistrorigo	October 16, 2014	August 25, 2014	108
9	"Luna's Lunar Quest"	Marcela Catunda	Célia Catunda & Kiko Mistrorigo	October 17, 2014	August 26, 2014	109
10	"Mirror, Mirror on the Wall"	Marcela Catunda; Patricia Black	Célia Catunda & Kiko Mistrorigo	October 17, 2014	August 27, 2014	110
11	"In Clyde's Eyes"	Marcela Catunda	Célia Catunda & Kiko Mistrorigo	October 20, 2014	August 28, 2015	111
12	"Butterfly Feet"	Marcela Catunda; Angelo Franchini	Célia Catunda & Kiko Mistrorigo	October 20, 2014	August 27, 2015	112
13	"Wings of a Bird"	Patricia Black	Célia Catunda & Kiko Mistrorigo	October 21, 2014	September 9, 2015	113
14	"Martians, Martians, Martians"	Marcela Catunda	Célia Catunda & Kiko Mistrorigo	October 21, 2014	August 18, 2015	114
15	"Do Fish Drink Water?"	Marcela Catunda	Célia Catunda & Kiko Mistrorigo	October 22, 2014	August 16, 2015	115
16	"Strong as an Ant"	Marcela Catunda; Patricia Black	Célia Catunda & Kiko Mistrorigo	October 22, 2014	August 29, 2015	116
17	"Shooting Stars"	Marcela Catunda	Célia Catunda & Kiko Mistrorigo	October 23, 2014	August 30, 2015	117
18	"Ice Giants"	Marcela Catunda	Célia Catunda & Kiko Mistrorigo	October 23, 2014	August 31, 2015	118
19	"As the Bread Rises"	Marcela Catunda; Patricia Black	Célia Catunda & Kiko Mistrorigo	October 24, 2014	September 3, 2015	119
20	"Luna-saurus Rex"	Marcela Catunda	Célia Catunda & Kiko Mistrorigo	October 24, 2014	September 4, 2015	120
21	"It All Falls Down"	Marcela Catunda; Patricia Black	Célia Catunda & Kiko Mistrorigo	October 27, 2014	September 5, 2015	121
22	"Flying Lights"	Marcela Catunda	Célia Catunda & Kiko Mistrorigo	October 27, 2014	September 6, 2015	122
23	"A Snail Tale"	Marcela Catunda	Célia Catunda & Kiko Mistrorigo	October 28, 2014	September 7, 2015	123
24	"Nighty Night, Sun"	Marcela Catunda	Célia Catunda & Kiko Mistrorigo	October 28, 2014	September 8, 2015	124
25	"Reaching the Rainbow"	Marcela Catunda	Célia Catunda & Kiko Mistrorigo	October 29, 2014	September 11, 2015	125
26	"The Sinking Grape"	Marcela Catunda	Célia Catunda & Kiko Mistrorigo	October 29, 2014	September 10, 2015	126

=== Season 2 (2015) ===
No.	Title	Written by	Directed by	Original air date	U.S. air date	Prod. code
1	"Blowing Bubbles"	Marcela Catunda	Célia Catunda & Kiko Mistrorigo	2016	July 13, 2015	101
2	"Drawings in the Sky"	Marcela Catunda	Célia Catunda & Kiko Mistrorigo	2016	July 14, 2015	102
3	"A Cat's Whiskers"	Marcela Catunda	Célia Catunda & Kiko Mistrorigo	2016	July 15, 2015	103
4	"Up, Up and Away!"	Marcela Catunda	Célia Catunda & Kiko Mistrorigo	2016	July 16, 2015	104
5	"Salt of the Sea"	Marcela Catunda	Célia Catunda & Kiko Mistrorigo	2016	July 20, 2015	105
6	"Great Craters!"	Marcela Catunda	Célia Catunda & Kiko Mistrorigo	2016	July 21, 2015	106
7	"Do Re Me Fa-lute"	Marcela Catunda	Célia Catunda & Kiko Mistrorigo	2016	2015	107
8	"Gecko Glue?"	Marcela Catunda	Célia Catunda & Kiko Mistrorigo	2016	July 22, 2015	108
9	"Snow Day"	Marcela Catunda	Célia Catunda & Kiko Mistrorigo	2016	2015	109
10	"Popcorn A-Poppin'"	Marcela Catunda	Célia Catunda & Kiko Mistrorigo	2016	July 23, 2015	110
11	"A Tail of Tails"	Marcela Catunda	Célia Catunda & Kiko Mistrorigo	2016	July 28, 2015	111
12	"Flowers and Fruit"	Camille Helms	Célia Catunda & Kiko Mistrorigo	2016	October 31, 2015	112
13	"Spinning Webs"	Camille Helms	Célia Catunda & Kiko Mistrorigo	2016	August 10, 2015	113
14	"One Thunder, Two Thunder, Three!"	Camille Helms	Célia Catunda & Kiko Mistrorigo	2016	August 3, 2015	114
15	"A Dog's Paws"	Camille Helms	Célia Catunda & Kiko Mistrorigo	2016	August 4, 2015	115
16	"The Superstar"	Marcela Catunda	Célia Catunda & Kiko Mistrorigo	2016	August 5, 2015	116
17	"Camouflage"	Marcela Catunda	Célia Catunda & Kiko Mistrorigo	2016	2015	117
18	"How Old Are You?"	Marcela Catunda	Célia Catunda & Kiko Mistrorigo	2016	October 31, 2015	118
19	"The Wonderful Forest of Chocolate"	Marcela Catunda	Célia Catunda & Kiko Mistrorigo	2016	August 13, 2015	119
20	"Silkworms"	Camille Helms	Célia Catunda & Kiko Mistrorigo	2016	August 10, 2015	120
21	"Slip-sliding Along"	Camille Helms	Célia Catunda & Kiko Mistrorigo	2016	August 11, 2015	121
22	"Shadows"	Marcela Catunda	Célia Catunda & Kiko Mistrorigo	2016	December 26, 2015	122
23	"Echo-Echo-Echo"	Camille Helms	Célia Catunda & Kiko Mistrorigo	2016	August 12, 2015	123
24	"Roly Poly Fun"	Camille Helms	Célia Catunda & Kiko Mistrorigo	2016	August 13, 2015	124
25	"Pretty Bird"	Marcela Catunda	Célia Catunda & Kiko Mistrorigo	2016	December 26, 2015	125
26	"One Thing Becomes Another"	Camille Helms	Célia Catunda & Kiko Mistrorigo	2016	2015	126

=== Season 3 (2016–17) ===
No.	Title	Written by	Directed by	Original air date	U.S. air date	Prod. code
1	"City Lights"	Marcela Catunda	Célia Catunda & Kiko Mistrorigo	October 3, 2016	TBA	TBA
2	"Dreams"	Camille Helms	Célia Catunda & Kiko Mistrorigo	October 4, 2016	TBA	TBA
3	"Nighty Night Horseys"	Rita Catunda	Célia Catunda & Kiko Mistrorigo	October 5, 2016	TBA	TBA
4	"A Dog's World"	Rita Catunda	Célia Catunda & Kiko Mistrorigo	October 6, 2016	TBA	TBA
5	"Wallowing in the Mud"	Camille Helms	Célia Catunda & Kiko Mistrorigo	October 7, 2016	TBA	TBA
6	"Atchoo!"	Marcela Catunda	Célia Catunda & Kiko Mistrorigo	October 10, 2016	TBA	TBA
7	"Stuck on You"	Camille Helms	Célia Catunda & Kiko Mistrorigo	October 11, 2016	TBA	TBA
8	"In or Out?"	Rita Catunda	Célia Catunda & Kiko Mistrorigo	October 12, 2016	TBA	TBA
9	"Mars Mission"	Marcela Catunda	Célia Catunda & Kiko Mistrorigo	October 13, 2016	TBA	TBA
10	"So Cheesy"	Marcela Catunda	Célia Catunda & Kiko Mistrorigo	October 14, 2016	TBA	TBA
11	"Tears, Tears Tears"	Rita Catunda	Célia Catunda & Kiko Mistrorigo	February 9, 2017	TBA	TBA
12	"Walking on a Cloud"	Marcela Catunda	Célia Catunda & Kiko Mistrorigo	February 9, 2017	TBA	TBA
13	"Grows As It Goes!"	Marcela Catunda	Célia Catunda & Kiko Mistrorigo	February 10, 2017	TBA	TBA
14	"A Ride in the Sky"	Rita Catunda	Célia Catunda & Kiko Mistrorigo	February 13, 2017	TBA	TBA
15	"Break of Dawn"	Camille Helms	Célia Catunda & Kiko Mistrorigo	February 13, 2017	TBA	TBA
16	"Tuned In"	Ricardo Sasaki	Célia Catunda & Kiko Mistrorigo	February 14, 2017	TBA	TBA
17	"Flee Flea!"	Marcela Catunda	Célia Catunda & Kiko Mistrorigo	February 14, 2017	TBA	TBA
18	"Magnetized"	Rita Catunda	Célia Catunda & Kiko Mistrorigo	June 6, 2017	TBA	TBA
19	"One Hand Washes the Other"	Camille Helms	Célia Catunda & Kiko Mistrorigo	June 7, 2017	TBA	TBA
20	"Planes in Space"	Rita Catunda	Célia Catunda & Kiko Mistrorigo	June 8, 2017	TBA	TBA
21	"The Milky Way"	Camille Helms	Célia Catunda & Kiko Mistrorigo	June 9, 2017	TBA	TBA
22	"Sweet, Sweet Fruit"	Rita Catunda	Célia Catunda & Kiko Mistrorigo	June 12, 2017	TBA	TBA
23	"Super Strong"	Ricardo Sasaki	Célia Catunda & Kiko Mistrorigo	June 13, 2017	TBA	TBA
24	"Set in Stone"	Rita Catunda	Célia Catunda & Kiko Mistrorigo	June 14, 2017	TBA	TBA
25	"Staying Dry"	Rita Catunda	Célia Catunda & Kiko Mistrorigo	June 15, 2017	TBA	TBA
26	"In Your Eyes"	Marcela Catunda	Célia Catunda & Kiko Mistrorigo	June 16, 2017	TBA	TBA

=== Season 4 (2017–18) ===
No.	Title	Written by	Directed by	Original air date	U.S. air date	Prod. code
1	"Northern Lights"	Camille Helms	Célia Catunda & Kiko Mistrorigo	December 21, 2017	TBA	TBA
2	"Dolphin Talk"	Rita Catunda	Célia Catunda & Kiko Mistrorigo	March 13, 2018	TBA	TBA
3	"Pyramids of the Past"	Rita Catunda	Célia Catunda & Kiko Mistrorigo	March 14, 2018	TBA	TBA
4	"Water Festival"	Camille Helms	Célia Catunda & Kiko Mistrorigo	March 15, 2018	TBA	TBA
5	"Ice Cold"	Camille Helms	Célia Catunda & Kiko Mistrorigo	March 16, 2018	TBA	TBA
6	"Aloha, Luna"	Rita Catunda	Célia Catunda & Kiko Mistrorigo	March 19, 2018	TBA	TBA
7	"Kaboom!"	Camille Helms	Célia Catunda & Kiko Mistrorigo	March 20, 2018	TBA	TBA
8	"Lost in the Desert"	Rita Catunda	Célia Catunda & Kiko Mistrorigo	March 21, 2018	TBA	TBA
9	"Hot or Cold?"	Rita Catunda	Célia Catunda & Kiko Mistrorigo	March 22, 2018	TBA	TBA
10	"Out of Breath!"	Camille Helms	Célia Catunda & Kiko Mistrorigo	March 23, 2018	TBA	TBA
11	"It's All Rosy"	Camille Helms	Célia Catunda & Kiko Mistrorigo	July 16, 2018	TBA	TBA
12	"Blue Giants"	Rita Catunda	Célia Catunda & Kiko Mistrorigo	July 17, 2018	TBA	TBA
13	"Aussie Animal"	Rita Catunda	Célia Catunda & Kiko Mistrorigo	July 18, 2018	TBA	TBA
14	"The Coral Choral"	Rita Catunda	Célia Catunda & Kiko Mistrorigo	July 19, 2018	TBA	TBA
15	"Sticking Your Neck Out"	Camille Helms	Célia Catunda & Kiko Mistrorigo	July 20, 2018	TBA	TBA
16	"Voyager's Voyage"	Rita Catunda	Célia Catunda & Kiko Mistrorigo	July 23, 2018	TBA	TBA
17	"White as Snow"	Camille Helms	Célia Catunda & Kiko Mistrorigo	July 24, 2018	TBA	TBA
18	"Green Island"	Rita Catunda	Célia Catunda & Kiko Mistrorigo	July 25, 2018	TBA	TBA
19	"A Pain in the Tooth"	Camille Helms	Célia Catunda & Kiko Mistrorigo	July 26, 2018	TBA	TBA
20	"Say Cheese"	Rita Catunda	Célia Catunda & Kiko Mistrorigo	July 27, 2018	TBA	TBA
21	"The Tree of Life"	Rita Catunda	Célia Catunda & Kiko Mistrorigo	October 11, 2018	TBA	TBA
22	"Rays of Sunshine"	Rita Catunda	Célia Catunda & Kiko Mistrorigo	October 12, 2018	TBA	TBA
23	"Solid as a Rock"	Camille Helms	Célia Catunda & Kiko Mistrorigo	November 15, 2018	TBA	TBA
24	"Once a Year"	Rita Catunda	Célia Catunda & Kiko Mistrorigo	November 15, 2018	TBA	TBA
25	"Hanging Tight"	Camille Helms	Célia Catunda & Kiko Mistrorigo	November 16, 2018	TBA	TBA
26	"Water-Luna-Melon"	Rita Catunda	Célia Catunda & Kiko Mistrorigo	November 16, 2018	TBA	TBA

=== Season 5 (2018–19) ===
No.	Title	Written by	Directed by	Original air date	U.S. air date	Prod. code
1	"Pearly Whites"	Rita Catunda	Célia Catunda & Kiko Mistrorigo	December 8, 2018	TBA	TBA
2	"Hello, Hello?"	Rita Catunda	Célia Catunda & Kiko Mistrorigo	December 8, 2018	TBA	TBA
3	"Crab Walk"	Camille Helms	Célia Catunda & Kiko Mistrorigo	February 20, 2019	TBA	TBA
4	"So Much Water"	Camille Helms	Célia Catunda & Kiko Mistrorigo	February 21, 2019	TBA	TBA
5	"Floating Along"	Camille Helms	Célia Catunda & Kiko Mistrorigo	February 22, 2019	TBA	TBA
6	"Friendly Ants"	Camille Helms	Célia Catunda & Kiko Mistrorigo	February 25, 2019	TBA	TBA
7	"Wiggle Worms"	Camille Helms	Célia Catunda & Kiko Mistrorigo	February 26, 2019	TBA	TBA
8	"Wonder Islands"	Rita Catunda	Célia Catunda & Kiko Mistrorigo	February 27, 2019	TBA	TBA
9	"Let It Lean"	Camille Helms	Célia Catunda & Kiko Mistrorigo	February 28, 2019	TBA	TBA
10	"The Scent of Spring"	Rita Catunda	Célia Catunda and Kiko Mistrorigo	May 31, 2019	TBA	TBA
11	"Flying Backwards"	Rita Catunda	Célia Catunda and Kiko Mistrorigo	June 24, 2019	TBA	TBA
12	"Red Hot!"	Rita Catunda	Célia Catunda & Kiko Mistrorigo	June 24, 2019	TBA	TBA
13	"Flying Vs"	Camille Helms	Célia Catunda & Kiko Mistrorigo	June 25, 2019	TBA	TBA
14	"Spots"	Mariana Bardan	Célia Catunda & Kiko Mistrorigo	June 25, 2019	TBA	TBA
15	"Whirly Twirly Storm"	Camille Helms	Célia Catunda & Kiko Mistrorigo	June 26, 2019	TBA	TBA
16	"Broken Bones"	Rita Catunda	Célia Catunda & Kiko Mistrorigo	June 26, 2019	TBA	TBA
17	"Yummy Dirt"	Camille Helms	Célia Catunda & Kiko Mistrorigo	June 26, 2019	TBA	TBA
18	"Near and Far"	Mariana Bardan; Rita Catunda	Célia Catunda & Kiko Mistrorigo	June 27, 2019	TBA	TBA
19	"Terrific Tentacles"	Mariana Bardan	Célia Catunda & Kiko Mistrorigo	June 28, 2019	TBA	TBA
20	"Where's the Sun?"	Rita Catunda	Célia Catunda & Kiko Mistrorigo	June 28, 2019	TBA	TBA
21	"Sights from Space"	Camille Helms	Célia Catunda & Kiko Mistrorigo	August 2, 2019	TBA	TBA
22	"Floating Houses"	Camille Helms	Célia Catunda & Kiko Mistrorigo	August 5, 2019	TBA	TBA
23	"An Out of This World Special, Part 1"	Rita Catunda	Célia Catunda & Kiko Mistrorigo	August 6, 2019	TBA	TBA
24	"An Out of This World Special, Part 2"	Rita Catunda	Célia Catunda & Kiko Mistrorigo	August 7, 2019	TBA	TBA
25	"No More Straws!"	Rita Catunda	Célia Catunda & Kiko Mistrorigo	August 8, 2019	TBA	TBA
26	"Giant Pinwheels!"	Camille Helms	Célia Catunda & Kiko Mistrorigo	August 9, 2019	TBA	TBA

=== Season 6 (2019–21) ===
No.	Title	Written by	Directed by	Original air date	U.S. air date	Prod. code
1	"Crystal Clear"	Camille Helms	Célia Catunda & Kiko Mistrorigo	December 15, 2019	TBA	TBA
2	"Walking on Water"	Rita Catunda	Célia Catunda & Kiko Mistrorigo	December 15, 2019	TBA	TBA
3	"A Different Way to Grow"	Camille Helms	Célia Catunda & Kiko Mistrorigo	December 15, 2019	TBA	TBA
4	"Drawing Luna"	Rita Catunda	Célia Catunda & Kiko Mistrorigo	December 15, 2019	TBA	TBA
5	"Give Me an Ear"	Camille Helms	Célia Catunda & Kiko Mistrorigo	January 13, 2020	TBA	TBA
6	"Bouncing Off the Walls"	Mariana Bardan	Célia Catunda & Kiko Mistrorigo	January 14, 2020	TBA	TBA
7	"Up All Night"	Camille Helms	Célia Catunda & Kiko Mistrorigo	January 20, 2020	TBA	TBA
8	"Breathe!"	Rita Catunda	Célia Catunda & Kiko Mistrorigo	January 21, 2020	TBA	TBA
9	"Flying Underwater"	Camille Helms	Célia Catunda & Kiko Mistrorigo	January 27, 2020	TBA	TBA
10	"Over the Moon"	Mariana Bardan	Célia Catunda & Kiko Mistrorigo	January 28, 2020	TBA	TBA
11	"A Day at the Beach"	Rita Catunda	Célia Catunda & Kiko Mistrorigo	March 26, 2020	TBA	TBA
12	"Feet on the Ground"	Rita Catunda	Célia Catunda & Kiko Mistrorigo	March 27, 2020	TBA	TBA
13	"Blue Skies"	Camille Helms	Célia Catunda & Kiko Mistrorigo	2020	TBA	TBA
14	"Long Distance Call"	Camille Helms	Célia Catunda & Kiko Mistrorigo	2020	TBA	TBA
15	"Colored Stars"	Mariana Bardan	Célia Catunda & Kiko Mistrorigo	2020	TBA	TBA
16	"A Lift to Space"	Rita Catunda	Célia Catunda & Kiko Mistrorigo	2020	TBA	TBA
17	"All Lit Up!"	Camille Helms	Célia Catunda & Kiko Mistrorigo	June 16, 2021	TBA	TBA
18	"Rock Collection"	Mariana Bardan	Célia Catunda & Kiko Mistrorigo	June 16, 2021	TBA	TBA
19	"Rainbow Food"	Rita Catunda	Célia Catunda & Kiko Mistrorigo	June 16, 2021	TBA	TBA
20	"Buzz Buzz Flowers & Fuzz"	Eduardo Melo	Célia Catunda & Kiko Mistrorigo	June 16, 2021	TBA	TBA
21	"Round and Round"	Mariana Bardan	Célia Catunda & Kiko Mistrorigo	June 16, 2021	TBA	TBA
22	"Rotten Sandwich"	Camille Helms	Célia Catunda & Kiko Mistrorigo	June 17, 2021	TBA	TBA
23	"A Drop of Water"	Rita Catunda	Célia Catunda & Kiko Mistrorigo	June 17, 2021	TBA	TBA
24	"Ice Cold!"	Mariana Bardan	Célia Catunda & Kiko Mistrorigo	June 17, 2021	TBA	TBA
25	"Just Won't Mix"	Camille Helms	Célia Catunda & Kiko Mistrorigo	June 17, 2021	TBA	TBA
26	"Sleep Tight"	Eduardo Melo	Célia Catunda & Kiko Mistrorigo	June 17, 2021	TBA	TBA

=== Season 7 (2021–22) ===
No.	Title	Written by	Directed by	Original air date	U.S. air date	Prod. code
1	"Footprints on the Moon"	Rita Catunda	Célia Catunda & Kiko Mistrorigo	December 13, 2021	TBA	TBA
2	"Healing Powers"	Camille Helms	Célia Catunda & Kiko Mistrorigo	December 14, 2021	TBA	TBA
3	"Ant-tronauts"	Marcela Catunda	Célia Catunda & Kiko Mistrorigo	December 15, 2021	TBA	TBA
4	"From Another World"	Rita Catunda	Célia Catunda & Kiko Mistrorigo	December 16, 2021	TBA	TBA
5	"Red Alert"	Camille Helms	Célia Catunda & Kiko Mistrorigo	December 17, 2021	TBA	TBA
6	"An Astronaut's Life"	Rita Catunda	Célia Catunda & Kiko Mistrorigo	December 20, 2021	TBA	TBA
7	"Who's Afraid of Halloween?, Part 1"	Marcela Catunda; Rita Catunda	Célia Catunda & Kiko Mistrorigo	October 30, 2021	TBA	TBA
8	"Who's Afraid of Halloween?, Part 2"	Marcela Catunda; Rita Catunda	Célia Catunda & Kiko Mistrorigo	October 30, 2021	TBA	TBA
9	"An Adventure to the Center of Earth"	Marcela Catunda	Célia Catunda & Kiko Mistrorigo	December 21, 2021	TBA	TBA
10	"The Other Side of the Moon"	Camille Helms	Célia Catunda & Kiko Mistrorigo	April 30, 2022	TBA	TBA
11	"Robot Dance"	Rita Catunda	Célia Catunda & Kiko Mistrorigo	June 7, 2022	TBA	TBA
12	"Shining Down"	Camille Helms	Célia Catunda & Kiko Mistrorigo	June 8, 2022	TBA	TBA
13	"V For Victory! V for Vaccines!"	Marcela Catunda	Célia Catunda & Kiko Mistrorigo	June 9, 2022	TBA	TBA
14	"The Giant Planet"	Marcela Catunda	Célia Catunda & Kiko Mistrorigo	June 10, 2022	TBA	TBA
15	"Chuckles and Giggles"	Camille Helms	Célia Catunda & Kiko Mistrorigo	June 13, 2022	TBA	TBA
16	"Super Speed"	Rita Catunda	Célia Catunda & Kiko Mistrorigo	June 14, 2022	TBA	TBA
17	"Four Seasons"	Rita Catunda	Célia Catunda & Kiko Mistrorigo	June 15, 2022	TBA	TBA
18	"Playing in the Rain"	Rita Catunda	Célia Catunda & Kiko Mistrorigo	November 1, 2022	TBA	TBA
19	"Astronomically Amazing"	Camille Helms	Célia Catunda & Kiko Mistrorigo	November 2022	TBA	TBA
20	"Come Rain or Shine"	Marcela Catunda	Célia Catunda & Kiko Mistrorigo	November 2022	TBA	TBA
21	"The New Star on the Block"	Camille Helms	Célia Catunda & Kiko Mistrorigo	November 2022	TBA	TBA
22	"Traveling Sounds"	Marcela Catunda	Célia Catunda & Kiko Mistrorigo	November 2022	TBA	TBA
23	"Just Imagine!"	Marcela Catunda	Célia Catunda & Kiko Mistrorigo	November 21, 2022	TBA	TBA
24	"The Chicken or the Egg?"	Rita Catunda	Célia Catunda & Kiko Mistrorigo	November 22, 2022	TBA	TBA
25	"First Words"	Rita Catunda	Célia Catunda & Kiko Mistrorigo	November 23, 2022	TBA	TBA
26	"Blast Off!"	Camille Helms	Célia Catunda & Kiko Mistrorigo	November 24, 2022	TBA	TBA

=== Season 8 (2023) ===
No.	Title	Written by	Directed by	Original air date	U.S. air date	Prod. code
1	"Wheeling Around"	Rita Catunda	Célia Catunda	October 23, 2023	June 24, 2025	TBA
2	"Vacuum Power"	Marcela Catunda	Kiko Mistrorigo	October 23, 2023	June 24, 2025	TBA
3	"Double Vision"	Camille Helms	Célia Catunda	October 23, 2023	June 24, 2025	TBA
4	"It's Raining Ideas"	Marcela Catunda	Rita Catunda	October 23, 2023	June 26, 2025	TBA
5	"The Big Secret"	Marcela Catunda	Célia Catunda	October 23, 2023	June 26, 2025	TBA
6	"Travel in a Flash!"	Rita Catunda	Kiko Mistrorigo	October 23, 2023	June 26, 2025	TBA
7	"Just Keep Playing"	Camille Helms	Rita Catunda	October 23, 2023	June 26, 2025	TBA
8	"To Fly or Not to Fly?"	Rita Catunda	Kiko Mistrorigo	October 23, 2023	June 26, 2025	TBA
9	"Race On!"	Marcela Catunda	Célia Catunda	October 23, 2023	June 26, 2025	TBA
10	"Lights, Camera, Action!"	Rita Catunda	Kiko Mistrorigo	October 23, 2023	June 26, 2025	TBA
11	"A World of Colors"	Marcela Catunda	Célia Catunda	October 23, 2023	June 26, 2025	TBA
12	"Up and Down"	Julio Caio	Célia Catunda	October 23, 2023	July 1, 2025	TBA
13	"Write It Out!"	Camille Helms	Kiko Mistrorigo	October 23, 2023	July 1, 2025	TBA
14	"Taking Control"	Camille Helms	Rita Catunda	October 23, 2023	July 1, 2025	TBA
15	"Grandma's Treasure"	Marcela Catunga	Kiko Mistrorigo	October 23, 2023	July 1, 2025	TBA
16	"Game On!"	Rita Catunda	Célia Catunda	October 23, 2023	July 1, 2025	TBA
17	"Darling Dolls"	Marcela Catunda	Kiko Mistrorigo	October 23, 2023	July 1, 2025	TBA
18	"One, Two, Three... Four, Five, Six"	Rita Catunda	Célia Catunda	October 23, 2023	July 1, 2025	TBA
19	"Brrrrr... It's Cold in Here"	Julio Caio	Rita Catunda	October 23, 2023	July 1, 2025	TBA
20	"Learning to Learn"	Camille Helms	Célia Catunda	October 23, 2023	July 3, 2025	TBA
21	"Black on White!"	Rita Catunda	Kiko Mistrorigo	October 23, 2023	July 3, 2025	TBA
22	"Who Invented the Viking Boat?"	Eduardo Melo	Célia Catunda	October 23, 2023	July 3, 2025	TBA
23	"Noodles Schmoodles"	Camille Helms	Rita Catunda	October 23, 2023	July 3, 2025	TBA
24	"Super Powers"	Rita Catunda	Kiko Mistrorigo	October 23, 2023	July 3, 2025	TBA
25	"Invisible or Impossible?"	Marcela Catunda	Célia Catunda	October 23, 2023	July 3, 2025	TBA
26	"Invasion of the Clones!"	Unknown	Célia Catunda	October 23, 2023	July 3, 2025	TBA

== Awards ==
Year	Award	Category	Nominee	Result
2016	International Emmy Kids Awards	Kids: Preschool	Earth to Luna	Nominated
