= Fishtronaut =

Brazilian-Canadian children's animated television series

- Portuguese: Peixonauta
- Genre: Children's television series Edutainment
- Created by: Célia Catunda; Kiko Mistrorigo
- Directed by: Célia Catunda; Kiko Mistrorigo; Rick Jones (voice)
- Voices of: Fábio Lucindo as Fishtronaut (Brazil); Dawn Ford as Fishtronaut (USA); Angela Galuppo as Marina (USA); Terrence Scammell as Zeek and Happy Plumb (USA); Rick Jones as Dr. Green (USA); Justin Bradley as Mac and Billy (USA); Holly Gauthier-Frankel as Rosy Barb (USA)
- Composer: Paulo Tatit
- Countries of origin: Brazil; Canada
- Original languages: Portuguese; English
- No. of seasons: 2
- No. of episodes: 104

Production
- Producers: Celia Catunda; Kiko Mistrorigo; Ricardo Rozzino
- Running time: 11 minutes
- Production companies: Discovery Kids Productions; TV PinGuim; Tooncan

Original release
- Network: Discovery Kids (Brazil); Knowledge Network/Yoopa (Canada)
- Release: April 20, 2009 – April 10, 2015

Fishtronaut (Portuguese: Peixonauta) is an animated children's television series created by Célia Catunda and Kiko Mistrorigo, and produced by TV PinGuim, in association with Discovery Kids Productions. The series is about the eponymous character, a fish in a spacesuit which allows him to fly and breathe out of water. He is a secret agent who, along with his friends Marina and Zeek, unravels the mysteries occurring in the Smiling Trees Park. They solve the mysteries with the help of a P.O.P. (Primary Objective Pod), a magical multicolored ball containing clues vital to the mission. Viewers are invited to dance along with the heroes to a tune, so that the P.O.P. will open and release the clues inside. The series is aimed at children ages 3–7 and debuted successfully on Discovery Kids in Latin America on 20 April 2009.

In the international market, the series is marketed by the names of Peztronauta (Spanish) or Fishtronaut (English). After success on TV, Fishtronaut was produced as a play called Peixonauta da TV para o Teatro (in English: Fishtronaut from TV to Theatre) which premiered on 9 January 2011 in Rio de Janeiro. On 9 November 2012, a movie titled Peixonauta – Agente Secreto da O.S.T.R.A. (in English: Fishtronaut – Secret Agent of O.Y.S.T.E.R.) was released. From 30 March 2015 to 25 December 2020, the series also aired on the now-defunct Qubo network, owned by Ion Media Networks.

The show has been noted for its success in teaching kids to care for the environment.

== Location ==
The show is set in the Smiling Trees Park, where elephants, monkeys and other animals from around the world roam free. Children are welcome to explore the forest and climb the trees, or ride a sub to the bottom of the cove and its colorful reef. In the park is Quiet Lake, which is fed by a long river. The river also extends beyond the lake into a sandy cove along the ocean.

== Characters ==
=== Main ===
- Fishtronaut (Portuguese: Peixonauta) (voiced by Fábio Lucindo in Portuguese and Dawn Ford in English) is an anthropomorphic big goldfish. He wears a Bubblex suit that allows him to fly out of water. It also has numerous tools useful during missions. He is always watching his friends Marina and Zeek, and investigating the problems of the Smiling Trees Park in order to solve them. He lives at the bottom of Quiet Lake, though he spends more time out on the surface with his friends. He is also an aspiring inventor, creating machines generally useful to the park. He usually communicates through a video screen fitted into his suit.
- Marina (voiced by Fernanda Bullara in Portuguese and Angela Galuppo in English) is a bright and curious brown-haired 8-year-old human girl who is also Fishtronaut's best friend. Every day, she proves to be a valuable member of the park's spy team. Whenever she and Fishtronaut happen to be apart, she can always use her trusty Aquawatch to stay in touch.
- Zeek (Portuguese: Zico) (voiced by Celso Alves in Portuguese and Terrence Scammell in English) is a tween-aged monkey who may love to monkey around, but his awesome tree-climbing abilities and finely-tuned sniffer make him invaluable to the team. Though he does come up with the most implausible of theories and even causes the occasional mix-up, his various intentions are nothing but the best.

=== Supporting ===
- Billy (Portuguese: Pedro) and Mac (Portuguese: Juca) (both voiced by Justin Bradley) are two 8-year-old twin brothers and Marina's rascal cousins. Their shenanigans tend to get them (and the park) in a heap of trouble, but they are harmless and have only the best intentions.
- Dr. Green (Portuguese: Dr. Jardim) (voiced by Rick Jones) is the grandfather of Marina and the twins Billy and Mac and also the wise vet and caretaker of Smiling Trees Park. He runs the park's Animal Hospital, which was built in a pod of a giant beanstalk. Whenever Marina's stuck, she knows Grandpa can help her find the answer.
- Rosy Barb (Portuguese: Agente Rosa) (voiced by Holly Gauthier-Frankel) is a S.E.A. agent who loves color and enjoys decorating the ocean bottom until it's just right. She knows the cove inside out and whenever Fishtronaut's on dry land, he can always check in with Rosy via the Web Clam.
- Happy Plumb (Portuguese: Chumbo Feliz) (voiced by Terrence Scammell) is a wise old fish who likes living quietly at the bottom of the cove and knows just about all there is. No one knows how long he's been around, but it's a very long time, indeed. He remembers the very beginnings of Smiling Trees Park. Whenever Fishtronaut is stumped, he knows Happy Plumb can point him in the right direction, that is, if he can decipher Plumb's riddle of an answer.

== Development and Production ==
Fishtronaut started initially as a Computer Game in 2000. However, by 2006, it was decided to make a Television show of the character.

The show was initially set to premiere in September 2008 but was delayed to 2009 due to animation retakes.

== Episode list ==
=== Season 1 (2009–11) ===
1. "The Case of the Disappearing Picnic Baskets (20/04/2009)"
2. "The Case of the Lost Critter (26/04/2009)"
3. "The Case of the Yucky Slime (03/05/2009)"
4. "The Case of the Mysterious Honk (14/05/2009)"
5. "The Case of Mistaken Identities (27/05/2009)"
6. "The Case of the Strange Smell (30/05/2009)"
7. "The Case of the Oily Rainbow (04/06/2009)"
8. "The Case of the Disappearing Friends (07/06/2009)"
9. "The Case of the Gopher Frenzy (11/06/2009)"
10. "The Case of the Quaking Park (15/06/2009)"
11. "The Case of Crabby Birthday (26/07/2009)"
12. "The Case of Missing Honey (10/08/2009)"
13. "The Case of the Lost Toy (31/08/2009)"
14. "The Case of the Mysterious Spots (11/09/2009)"
15. "The Case of the Spooky Night (18/10/2009)"
16. "The Case of Zeek's Disappearance (03/11/2009)"
17. "The Case of the Sunny Day (16/11/2009)"
18. "The Case of the Long-Nosed Monkey (22/11/2009)"
19. "The Case of the Messy Storeroom (28/11/2009)"
20. "The Case of the Pitch Black Night (04/12/2009)"
21. "The Case of the Flowerless Garden (13/12/2009)"
22. "The Case of the Seven Colors" ("The Case of the Seven Colours" in Canada, the UK, Australia & New Zealand) (12/01/2010)
23. "The Case of the Lazy Rabbit (03/02/2010)"
24. "The Case of the Missing Water (06/03/2010)"
25. "The Case of the Stranded Giant (07/04/2010)"
26. "The Case of the Kiwi Bird (06/05/2010)"
27. "The Case of the Bubbles (08/06/2010)"
28. "The Case of Happy Plumb (04/09/2010)"
29. "The Case of the Day that was Night (11/10/2010)"
30. "The Case of the Seed Spreaders (01/11/2010)"
31. "The Laughter Case (12/11/2010)"
32. "The Case of the Lurking Creature (24/11/2010)"
33. "The Case of the Pale Flowers (27/11/2010)"
34. "The Case of the Flying Leaves (07/12/2010)"
35. "The Case of the Little Sheep (15/12/2010)"
36. "The Case of the Blue Wings (23/12/2010)"
37. "The Case of the Molten Ice (08/01/2011)"
38. "The Case of the Disappearing Logs (05/02/2011)"
39. "The Case of the Missing Crickets (07/03/2011)"
40. "The Case of the Shining Gnomes (02/04/2011)"
41. "The Case of the End of the World (10/05/2011)"
42. "The Case of the Plastic Bottles (09/06/2011)"
43. "The Case of the Puppies (07/08/2011)"
44. "The Case that Fell from the Sky (06/09/2011)"
45. "The Case of the... What case is this again? (01/10/2011)"
46. "The Case of the Heavy Rain (06/10/2011)"
47. "The Case of Marina's Gift (11/10/2011)"
48. "The Case of the Scalding Sands (16/10/2011)"
49. "The Case of the Missing Eggs (23/10/2011)"
50. "The Case of the Disappearing Things (26/10/2011)"
51. "The Case of Billy's Disappearance (03/11/2011)"
52. "The Case of the Three Singers (18/11/2011)"

=== Season 2 (2012–15) ===
1. "The Case of the Unknown Animals (09/11/2012)"
2. "The Case of the New Food (13/11/2012)"
3. "The Case of the Crazy Deliveries (16/11/2012)"
4. "The Case of the Monster (24/11/2012)"
5. "The Case of the House that Became a Street (28/11/2012)"
6. "The Case of the New Best Friend (07/12/2012)"
7. "The Case of the Silent Animal (11/12/2012)"
8. "The Case of the Growing Mystery (16/12/2012)"
9. "The Case of the Banana Gang (22/12/2012)"
10. "The Case of the Fibbing Fishy (13/01/2013)"
11. "The Yellow Case (06/02/2013)"
12. "The Case of the Hidden Treasure (02/03/2013)"
13. "The Case of Dr. Green (03/04/2013)"
14. "The Case of the Missing Tooth (04/05/2013)"
15. "The Case of the Extreme Speed (07/06/2013)"
16. "The Case of SuperZeek (03/07/2013)"
17. "The Case of the Silly Fight (09/09/2013)"
18. "The Case of the Little Red Berries (06/11/2013)"
19. "The Oval Case (10/12/2013)"
20. "The Case of Zeek's Cousin (04/01/2014)"
21. "The Case of the Rock Shower (06/02/2014)"
22. "The Case of the Weird Fish (07/03/2014)"
23. "The Case of the Pirate Ship (08/04/2014)"
24. "The Case of the Other Fishtronaut (02/05/2014)"
25. "The Case of the Bright Night (03/06/2014)"
26. "The Case of the Underwater Desert (09/07/2014)"
27. "The Case of Judgement (05/08/2014)"
28. "The Case of the Little Indian Boy (15/08/2014)"
29. "The Case of the Great Big Wall (23/08/2014)"
30. "The Case of Marina Online (27/08/2014)"
31. "The Case of the Zzzzz's (29/08/2014)"
32. "The Case of the Mysterious Song (03/09/2014)"
33. "The Case of the Rust Bucket (04/09/2014)"
34. "The Case of Autumn (09/09/2014)"
35. "The Case of the Moon (10/09/2014)"
36. "The Case of the Spinning Dolphins (11/09/2014)"
37. "The Case of the Rainmaker (21/09/2014)"
38. "The Case of the Cave of Wonders (26/09/2014)"
39. "The Case of One Little Minute (29/09/2014)"
40. "The Case of the Missing River (01/10/2014)"
41. "The Case of the I Wanna's (04/10/2014)"
42. "The Case of the Burned-Out Fish (11/10/2014)"
43. "The Case of the Kitty (13/11/2014)"
44. "The Case of the Little Big Friend (24/12/2014)"
45. "The Case of Zeek's Banana Grove (03/01/2015)"
46. "The Case of the Yellow Wings (04/02/2015)"
47. "The Case of the New Little Brother (06/03/2015)"
48. "The Black and White Case (11/03/2015)"
49. "The Case of the Broken Parts (16/03/2015)"
50. "The Hawaiian Case (25/03/2015)"
51. "The Case of the Walking Rock (04/04/2015)"
52. "The Case of the Flying Tree (10/04/2015)"

== Reception ==
Fishtronaut received generally positive and currently has a four out of five from Common Sense Media.

== Broadcast ==
Fishtronaut was first broadcast in Latin America on 20 April 2009 on Discovery Kids with the name Peixonauta in Portuguese and Peztronauta in Spanish. The Spanish version of the show was dubbed in Chile by DINT Doblajes Internacionales. A European Spanish dub that aired in Spain by Clan, owned by RTVE, has the characters speak in a Spanish accent. The series has been broadcast in the United States on Qubo. The series also has been aired in French-speaking Canada on the now defunct kids network Yoopa (as Poissonaute). It was dubbed in Czech and aired in the Czech Republic on ČT Déčko (as Agent Ploutvička). A Turkish-dubbed version of the show (called Balıktronot) was broadcast in Turkey on TRT Çocuk.

== Films ==
The film Peixonauta – Agente Secreto da O.S.T.R.A. was released in theaters on 9 November 2012, in commemoration of three years of the series. The film was planned for two years and was released months before the premiere of season 2 of the TV series. The film is a compilation of some episodes of the first season.

A second film was released in January 2018, with an original story.

== Revival ==
A revival of Fishtronaut has been announced in 2023 and is gonna be animated in Computer animation. The revival is supposingly set to premiere 2026, but as of September 2026, the release date is still unconfirmed.
