= Fábio Lucindo =

Brazilian actor (born 1984)

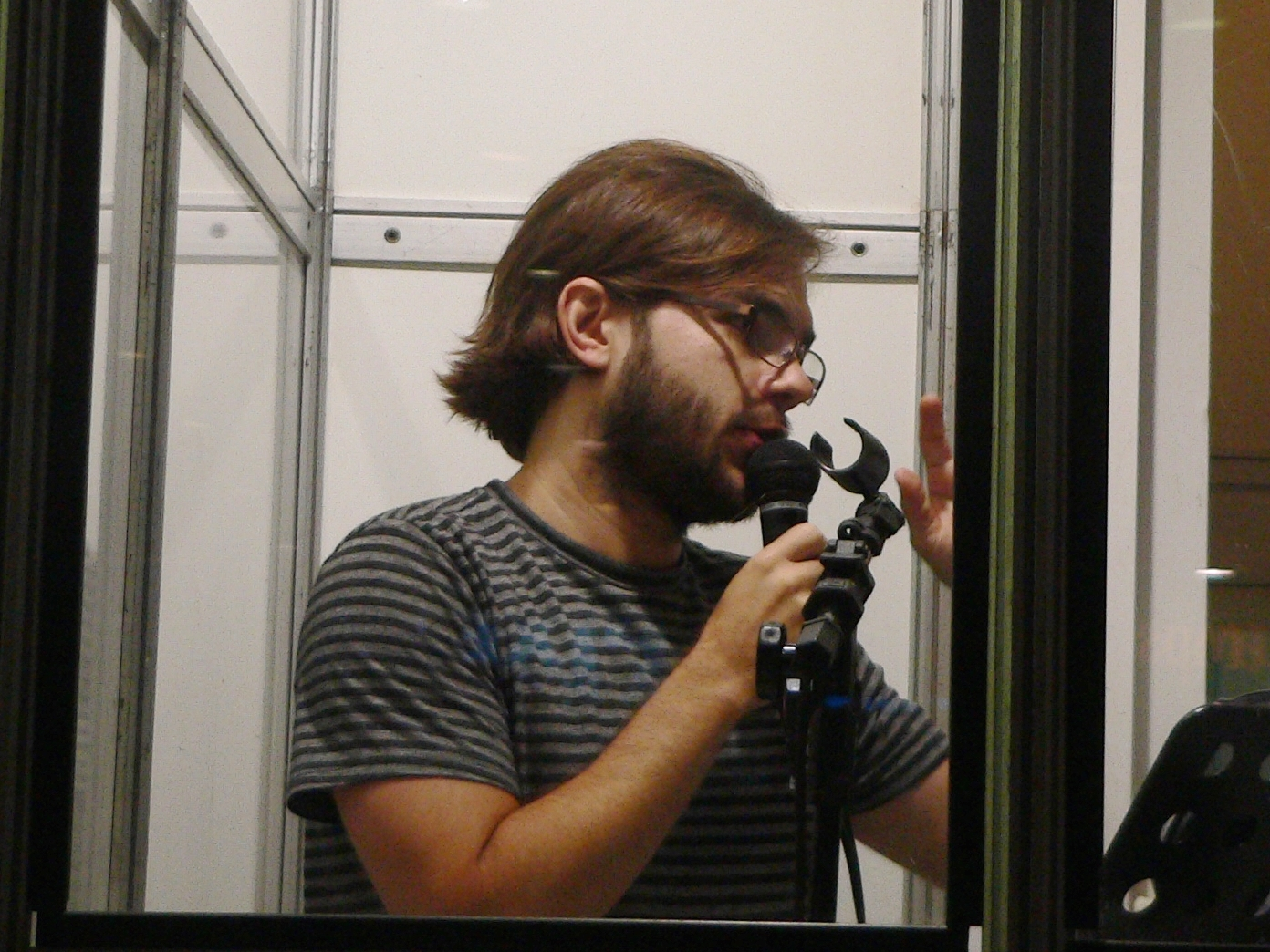
- Lucindo at the 2014 Comic Con Experience in São Paulo, Brazil.
- Born: February 16, 1984 (age 41); São Paulo, Brazil
- Occupations: Actor; presenter
- Years active: 1992–present

Fábio Lucindo (born February 16, 1984) is a Brazilian actor and presenter. He specializes in dubbing cartoons, anime, films, and video games in the Portuguese language. Lucindo was born in São Paulo, and is perhaps most known for voicing Ash Ketchum in Pokémon from 1999 to 2015 and Fishtronaut in the eponymous television series.

Lucindo's major dubbing works includes the characters Shinji Ikari in Neon Genesis Evangelion, Shaoran in Cardcaptor Sakura, Kuririn in Dragon Ball, Kiba Inuzuka in Naruto, Arnold in Hey Arnold!, Takuya Kanbara in Digimon Frontier, Ichigo Kurosaki in Bleach, Killua Zoldyck in the 1999 Hunter × Hunter anime and Katsuki Bakugo in My Hero Academia.

He also voiced Spider-Man (The Spectacular Spider-Man), Eric Forman in That 70s Show, Zeke Falcone in Zeke and Luther, Stevie Kenarban in Malcolm in the Middle, Ben Singer in Unfabulous, Marvin Forman in Marvin Marvin, Darren Patterson in As Told by Ginger, Chad Dylan Cooper in Sonny with a Chance, Phil Diffy in Phil of the Future, Troy Bolton (played by Zac Efron from the High School Musical), Flash in Roary the Racing Car, Alvin Seville (The Alvin Show), Spyro the Dragon for the Skylanders series, which is the second reboot for the Spyro the Dragon video game franchise, and Snips from My Little Pony: Friendship Is Magic as well as voicing Cheese Sandwich in the show's season four episode "Pinkie Pride".

In 2015, Lucindo moved to Portugal, where he studied at the University of Coimbra for three years. He returned to Brazil in 2018.
