= List of Brazilian animated films =

List of animated films made in Brazil.

== 1910s ==
Title	Director	Genre	Notes
1917
Kaiser	Álvaro Marins	Traditional animation	Brazil's first animated short film. Original lost.
Traquinices de Chiquinho e seu inseparável amigo Jagunço	Unknown	Traditional animation	Based on the comic strip published in the magazine O Tico-Tico. Lost.
1918
As Aventuras de Bille e Bolle		Traditional animation	Lost.

== 1920s ==
Title	Director	Genre	Notes
1929
Macaco Feio, Macaco Bonito	Luiz Seel	Traditional animation	Oldest record of a Brazilian Animation Film with Preserved Copy.

== 1930s ==
Title	Director	Genre	Notes
1930
Frivolitá	Luiz Seel	Traditional animation	
1938
Virgulino Apanha	Luiz Sá	Traditional animation	Partially Lost.
As Aventuras de Virgulino	Luiz Sá	Traditional animation	Partially Lost.

== 1940s ==
Title	Director	Genre	Notes
1940
Os Azares de Lulu	Anélio Latini Filho	Traditional animation	
1942
O Dragãozinho Manso: Jonjoca	Humberto Mauro	Puppetry	First animated movie featuring puppets.

== 1950s ==
Title	Director	Genre	Notes
1951
Amazon Symphony	Roberto Miller	Traditional animation	Brazil's first animated feature-length film
1957
Rumba	Anelio Latini	Experimental animation	
1959
Boogie Woogie	Roberto Miller	Experimental animation	

== 1970s ==
Title	Director	Genre	Notes
1970
Batuque	Pedro Ernesto Stilpen	Traditional animation	Awarded as the Best Animation by the Popular Jury of the Brasília Festival in 1970.
1971
Presente de Natal	Álvaro Henrique Gonçalves	Traditional animation	Lost.
Carnaval 2001	Roberto Miller	Experimental animation	
1972
Piconzé	Ypê Nakashima	Traditional animation	First color animated Brazilian feature film
Balé de Lissajous	Aluízio Arcela and José Mário Parrot	CG animation	First computer-animated short film made in Brazil, in honor of the French physicist Jules Antoine Lissajous.
1974
Carcará	Ruy Perotti	Traditional animation	Pilot short film for a television series that was never produced.
1975
Ícaro e o Labirinto	Antônio Moreno	Live-action/animated film	Pilot short film for a television series that was never produced.
1976
O Natal da Turma da Mônica	Mauricio de Sousa and Jayme Cortez	Traditional animation	Short animation. First Brazilian Animation Film made for Television that was successfully completed.
1978
Can-Can	Roberto Miller	Experimental animation	
1979
A Saga da Asa Branca	Luiz Gonzaga de Oliveira	Traditional animation	

== 1980s ==
Title	Director	Genre	Notes
1981
Meow!	Marcos Magalhães	Traditional animation	Short film winner of the Special Jury Prize at Cannes, 1982
1982
Squich	Flávio del Carlo	Live-action/animated film	Short film winner of the Special Jury Prize at Cannes, 1982
As Aventuras da Turma da Mônica	Maurício de Sousa	Traditional animation	
Animando	Marcos Magalhães	Traditional animation	Short film showing various animation techniques
1983
Tzubra Tzuma	Flávio del Carlo	Traditional animation	
Turma da Mônica - A Princesa e o Robô	Maurício de Sousa	Traditional animation	
1984
Boi Aruá	Chico Liberato	Traditional animation	
1985
Planeta Terra	Marcos Magalhães	Traditional animation	Short Film with the participation of thirty artists, for the International Year of Peace (1986)
Os Trapalhões no Reino da Fantasia	Dedé Santana	Live-action/animated film	Animated Sequence in a Live-Action Feature Film
1986
Frankenstein Punk	Cao Hamburger and Eliana Fonseca	Stop-motion	
Noturno	Aída Queiroz	Traditional animation	
Masp Movie	Hamilton Zini Jr.	Traditional animation	
As Novas Aventuras da Turma da Mônica	Maurício de Sousa	Traditional animation	
Os Trapalhões no Rabo do Cometa	Dedé Santana	Live-action/animated film	
1987
Mônica e a Sereia do Rio	Maurício de Sousa	Live-action/animated film	
Turma da Mônica em: O Bicho-Papão	Maurício de Sousa	Traditional animation	
1988
Adeus	Céu D'Ellia	Traditional animation	
A Garota das Telas	Cao Hamburger	Traditional animation	
Turma da Mônica e a Estrelinha Mágica	Maurício de Sousa	Traditional animation	

== 1990s ==
Title	Director	Genre	Notes
1990
Chico Bento, Oia a Onça!	Maurício de Sousa	Traditional animation	Medium-length (Collection of Short Films); First Brazilian Animation Film Released Direct-to-Video
1991
The Christmas Tree	Flamarion Ferreira	Traditional animation	
1993
El Macho	Ênio Torresan Jr.	Traditional animation	
O Natal de Todos Nós	Mauricio de Sousa	Traditional animation	
1994
Rocky & Hudson	Otto Guerra	Traditional animation	Based on the comic strip characters created by Adão Iturrusgarai. Brazil's first adult-oriented animated film.
1995
Smilingüido em Moda Amarela	Marcia d'Haese	Traditional animation	First animation based on a Christian media character and also the first animation based on Smilingüido.
Gaín Pañan e a Origem da Pupunheira	Luiz Fernando Perazzo	Traditional animation	Short Film; First ethnographic animation made in Brazil by a public university, the Federal University of Rio de Janeiro
1996
Cassiopéia	Clóvis Veira	CG animation	Brazil's first CG feature-length film.
Estrela de Oito Pontas	Marcos Magalhães	Documentary/Traditional animation	Short Film made with the drawings of the psychiatric patient Fernando Diniz, Special Jury Prize in Gramado, 1996
Turma da Mônica em Quadro a Quadro	Mauricio de Sousa	Traditional animation	
1997
Videogibi Turma da Mônica: O Mônico	Mauricio de Sousa	Traditional animation	
1998
Castelos de Vento	Tanya Anaya	Traditional animation	
Os Melhores Amantes Bebem Café	Wilson Lazzaretti and Maurício Squarisi	Traditional animation	Short Film about the Constitutionalist Revolution of 1932
Videogibi Turma da Mônica: O Plano Sangrento	Mauricio de Sousa	Traditional animation	
Videogibi Turma da Mônica: O Estranho Soro do Doutor X	Mauricio de Sousa	Traditional animation	
1999
Deus é Pai	Allan Sieber	Traditional animation	Short Film Winner of the Competitive Screening at the Gramado Film Festival in 1999 and Best Brazilian Animation at Anima-Mundi Carioca in 1999
Videogibi Turma da Mônica: A Ilha Misteriosa	Mauricio de Sousa	Traditional animation	

== 2000s ==
Title	Director	Genre	Notes
2001
Onde Andará Petrucio Felker?	Allan Sieber	Traditional animation	
The Happy Cricket	Walbercy Ribas	Traditional animation	
2002
Smilinguido em A Invasão	Dieter Fuchs	Traditional animation	
A Traça Teca	Diego M. Doimo	Live-action/animated film	
2003
Juro que Vi: O Curupira	Humberto Avelar	Traditional animation	First film in the Juro que Vi series.
2004
Cine Gibi: O Filme	José Márcio Nicosi	Live-action/animated film	Compilation of episodes based on Monica and Friends comics and being the first in the Cine Gibi series and the only one to have a theatrical debut. Also being the only one in the series to present 2D animation with live action.
Juro que Vi: O Boto	Humberto Avelar	Traditional animation	
Juro que Vi: Iara	Sergio Glenes	Traditional animation	
2005
Cine Gibi 2	Mauricio de Sousa	Traditional animation	Compilation. Released direct-to-video. Last movie to contain an animated episode focused on Chuck Billy 'n' Folks.
Xuxinha e Guto contra os Monstros do Espaço	Clewerson Saremba and Moacyr Góes	Live-action/animated film	Based on the media character Xuxinha and part of the Xuxa movie series.
Historietas Assombradas (para Crianças Malcriadas)	Victor-Hugo Borges	Stop motion/CG animation	This animated short served as inspiration for the animated series of the same name that premiered on Cartoon Network in 2013.
2006
Juro que Vi: Matinta Perera	Humberto Avelar	Traditional animation	
Wood & Stock: Sexo, Orégano e Rock'n'Roll	Otto Guerra	Traditional animation	Second adult animated feature film. Based on the comic strip created by Angeli.
The Little Cars in the Great Race	Cristiano Valente	CG animation	Released directly to video, it was the first Video Brinquedo film and a mockbuster of Pixar's Cars. It was the first release in The Little Cars series that spun off an animated series also released direct-to-video in the following volumes.
2007
Brichos	Paulo Munhoz	Traditional animation	First film in the Brichos franchise.
Garoto Cósmico	Alê Abreu	Traditional animation	
Uma Aventura no Tempo	Maurício de Sousa	Flash animation	Second animated film based on Monica and Friends that is not a compilation of episodes adapted from the comics. Also the first animated media based on Monica and Friends to be animated in flash animation.
Ratatoing	Vídeo Brinquedo	CG animation	
Little Bee	Vídeo Brinquedo	CG animation	
Gladiformers	Marco Alemar	CG animation	
2008
Dossiê Rê Bordosa	Cesar Cabral	Stop-motion	Animated short based in the comic strip character created by Angeli
Calango Lengo - Morte e Vida Sem Ver Água	Fernando Miller	Traditional animation	
Cine Gibi 3	Mauricio de Sousa	Flash animation	First in the Cine Gibi series to be animated in flash animation.
The Little Panda Fighter	Vídeo Brinquedo	CG animation	
Gladiformers 2	Marco Alemar	CG animation	
BR Futebol	Marco Alemar	CG animation	The only original animated film produced by Vídeo Brinquedo.
2009
Belowars	Paulo Munhoz	Traditional animation	
Cine Gibi 4	Mauricio de Sousa	Flash animation	Compilation
The Happy Cricket and the Giant Bugs	Walbercy Ribas and Rafael Ribas	CG animation	
Josué e o Pé de Macaxeira	Diogo Viegas	Traditional animation	
Juro que Vi: O Saci	Humberto Avelar	Traditional animation	
Little & Big Monsters	Vídeo Brinquedo	CG animation	
What's UP: Balloon to the Rescue!	Vídeo Brinquedo	CG animation	

== 2010s ==
Title	Director	Genre	Notes
2010
Cine Gibi 5	Mauricio de Sousa	Flash animation	Compilation
2011
Brasil Animado	Mariana Caltabiano	Live-action/animated film	First Brazilian movie completely produced with 3D technology.
2012
31 minutos, la película	Álvaro Díaz and Pedro Peirano	Puppetry	Co-production with Chile and Spain.
Brichos - A Floresta é Nossa	Paulo Munhoz	Traditional animation	Second film in the Brichos franchise.
Peixonauta - Agente Secreto da O.S.T.R.A.	Célia Catunda and Kiko Mistrorigo	Traditional animation	Compilation
Cine Gibi 6	Mauricio de Sousa	Flash animation	Compilation
2013
Rio 2096: A Story of Love and Fury	Luiz Bolognesi	Traditional animation	
Até que a Sbónia nos Separe	Otto Guerra, Ennio Torresan Jr	Traditional animation	
Worms	Paolo Conti, Arthur Nunes	Stop motion	First Brazilian stop-motion animated film
2014
The Boy and The World	Alê Abreu	Traditional animation	
Cine Gibi 7	Mauricio de Sousa	Flash animation	Compilation
The Adventures of the Red Airplane	Frederico Pinto and José Maia	Traditional animation	
Guida	Rosana Urbes	Traditional animation	
História Antes de Uma História	Wilson Lazaretti	Traditional animation	
2015
As Aventuras do Pequeno Colombo	Rodrigo Gava	Flash animation	
Cine Gibi 8	Mauricio de Sousa	Flash animation	Compilation
Até a China	Marcelo Fabri Marão	Traditional animation	
2016
Cine Gibi 9	Mauricio de Sousa	Flash animation	Compilation
O Projeto do Meu Pai	Rosaria Moreira	Flash animation	
2017
GadgetGang in Outer Space	Ale McHaddo	CG animation	
Lino: An Adventure of Nine Lives	Rafael Ribas	CG animation	
Historietas Assombradas: O Filme	Victor-Hugo Borges	Flash animation	Television film based in the animated series Haunted Tales for Wicked Kids
2018
Peixonauta - O Filme	Célia Catunda and Kiko Mistrorigo	Flash animation	
Tito e os Pássaros	Gabriel Bitar, Gustavo Steinberg and André Catoto	Traditional animation	
A Cidade dos Piratas	Otto Guerra	Traditional animation	
Guaxuma	Nara Normande	Mixed Techniques	Won several awards including Best Animation at SXSW and Best International Short at Palm Springs
2019
CARNE	Camila Kater	Mixed Techniques	CARNE was selected in more than 250 festivals (Locarno, Annecy and TIFF), received more than 95 awards worldwide, was qualified for the 2021 Oscar®, EFA Academy Awards and shortlisted for Goya

== 2020s ==
2020
Os Under-Undergrounds, O Começo	Nelson Botter Jr.	Flash animation	Compilation with episodes of the first season of Os Under-Undergrounds
Uma Noite Antes do Natal	Nelson Botter Jr.	Flash animation	TV special based in the animated series The Amazing Professor Ambrosius´ Mansion
Napo	Gustavo Ribeiro	CG animation	Animated Short Awarded at 20 Festivals
The Red Scroll	Nelson Botter Jr.	Flash animation	Premiered in Brazil in 2021.
Nahuel and the Magic Book	Germán Acuña	Traditional animation	Co-production with Chile. Premiered in Brazil in 2024.
2021
Bob Cuspe – We Don't Like People	Cesar Cabral	Stop-motion	Based in the comic strip character created by Angeli. Spiritual successor to the 2008 short film Dossiê Rê Bordosa
2022
Tarsilinha	Célia Catunda and Kiko Mistrorigo	CG animation	
My Big Big Friend – The Movie	Andrés Lieban	Flash animation	Based in the animated series My Big Big Friend
Trunk Train: The Movie	Zé Brandão	Flash animation	Based in the animated series Trunk Train
Meu Tio José	Ducca Rios	Flash animation	
2023
Chef Jack: The Adventurous Cook	Artur Costa, Carlos Daniel, Guilherme Fiúza e Rodrigo Guimarães	Flash animation	
Perlimps	Alê Abreu	Traditional animation	
Brichos 3 - Megavírus	Paulo Munhoz	Traditional animation	Third film in the Brichos franchise.
Placa-Mãe	Igor Bastos	Flash animation	Premiered in Brazil in 2024.
2024
Bizarros Peixes das Fossas Abissais	Marcelo Fabri Marão	Traditional animation	
Teca e Tuti: uma Noite na Biblioteca	Tiago M. A. Lima and Eduardo Perdido	Stop-motion/Live-action	Based in the 2002 short film A Traça Teca
Noah's Ark	Alois Di Leo and Sérgio Machado	CG animation	

== See also ==
- List of Brazilian animated series
  - History of Brazilian animation
