= List of animated feature films of 2022 =

This is a list of animated feature films that were released in 2022.

== List ==
Title	Country	Director	Production company	Animation technique	Notes	Release date	Duration
3 Little Kungpoo Goats	China; Islamic Republic of Iran	Farzad Dalvand; Kianoush Dalvand	Aria Animation Studio	CG animation		September 10, 2022 (World Festival of Animated Film); April 13, 2023 (Russia); May 24, 2024 (Turkey)	89 minutes
The Alpine Campaign	Russia	Boris Chertkov	Gorky Film Studios; KinoAtis; Soyuzmultfilm	CG animation		May 1, 2022	85 minutes
The Amazing Maurice	Germany; United Kingdom	Toby Genkel; Florian Westermann	Cantilever Media; Red Star Media; Sky Cinema; Studio Rakete; Ulysses Filmproduktion	CG animation		November 13, 2022 (Manchester Animation Festival); December 16, 2022 (United Kingdom); February 3, 2023 (United States)	90 minutes
Go! Anpanman: Dororin and the Transformation Carnival ja:それいけ!アンパンマン ドロリンとバケ〜るカーニバル	Japan	Jun Kawagoe	Anpanman Production Committee, TMS Entertainment	Traditional		June 25, 2022	62 minutes
Apollo 10½: A Space Age Childhood	United States	Richard Linklater	Netflix Animation; Minnow Mountain; Submarine	Rotoscope		March 13, 2022 (SXSW); April 1, 2022 (Netflix)	98 minutes
Aqua Teen Forever: Plantasm	United States	Matt Maiellaro; Dave Willis	Williams Street	Traditional; Flash animation		November 8, 2022	79 minutes
Aurora's Sunrise	Armenia; Germany; Lithuania	Inna Sahakyan	Bars Media; Artbox; Gebrueder Beetz Filmproduktion	Traditional; CG animation		June 16, 2022 (Annecy)	96 minutes
The Bad Guys	United States	Pierre Perifel	Universal Pictures; DreamWorks Animation	CG animation		April 22, 2022	100 minutes
Barbie: Mermaid Power	United States	Ron Myrick	Mattel Entertainment	CG animation		September 1, 2022	65 minutes
Barbie: Epic Road Trip	United States	Conrad Helten	Mattel Entertainment	CG animation		October 25, 2022	65 minutes
Batman and Superman: Battle of the Super Sons	United States	Matt Peters	Warner Bros. Animation; DC Entertainment	CG animation		October 7, 2022 (NYCC); October 18, 2022 (Video)	79 minutes
Beavis and Butt-Head Do the Universe	United States	Mike Judge	MTV Entertainment Group; Titmouse, Inc. 3 Arts Entertainment; Judgemental Films	Flash animation		June 23, 2022	87 minutes
Big Trip 2: Special Delivery	Russia	Vasily Rovensky; Natalya Nilova	Licensing Brands	CG animation		September 23, 2022 (South Africa); October 27, 2022 (Russia)	90 minutes
Black Is Beltza II: Ainhoa	Spain; Argentina	Fermín Muguruza	BIB2 Ainhoa AIE; Talka Records; Draftoon; Lagarto	Flash animation		September 23, 2022 (Zinemaldia); September 30, 2022 (Spain); October 20, 2022 (Argentina)	86 minutes
The Black Pharaoh, the Savage and the Princess	Belgium; France	Michel Ocelot	Nord-Ouest Films	CG animation		October 19, 2022	83 minutes
Blind Willow, Sleeping Woman	Canada; France; Luxembourg; Netherlands	Pierre Földes	Miyu Productions; Cinéma De facto Doghouse Films micro_scope Productions L'Unité Centrale; An Original Picture; Studio MA; Arte France Cinéma; Auvergne-Rhône-Alpes Cinéma	Traditional		June 15, 2022 (Annecy)	108 minutes
Blue's Big City Adventure	United States	Matt Stawski	Nickelodeon Movies; Nickelodeon Animation Studio; 9 Story Media Group; Brown Bag Films; Line By Line Media; Boxel Animation	CG animation Live-action		November 18, 2022	82 minutes
The Bob's Burgers Movie	United States	Loren Bouchard; Bernard Derriman	20th Century Studios	Traditional		May 17, 2022 (El Capitan Theatre); May 27, 2022 (United States)	102 minutes
Boonie Bears: Back to Earth	China	Lin Huida	Fantawild Animation	CG animation		February 1, 2022	99 minutes
The Boy and the Sword	Turkey	Emad Rahmani	Permanent Way Entertainment	CG animation		February 1, 2022 (Fajr International Film Festival)	87 minutes
Bubble	Japan	Tetsurō Araki	Wit Studio	Traditional		February 10, 2022 (Berlin); April 28, 2022 (Netflix); May 13, 2022 (theatrical)	100 minutes
Catwoman: Hunted	United States; Japan	Shinsuke Terasawa	Warner Bros. Animation; DC Entertainment	Traditional		February 8, 2022	78 minutes
Charlotte	Canada; France; Belgium	Eric Warin; Tahir Rana	Charlotte Productions; Les Productions Balthazar; Walking the Dog	Flash animation		September 13, 2021 (TIFF); April 22, 2022 (Canada); November 9, 2022 (France)	92 minutes
Chickenhare and the Hamster of Darkness	Belgium; France	Ben Stassen; Matthieu Zeller	Sony Pictures International Productions nWave Pictures; Octopolis	CG animation		January 23, 2022 (Gaumont Champs-Élysées); February 16, 2022 (Belgium); June 10, 2022 (United States)	91 minutes
Chip 'n Dale: Rescue Rangers	United States	Akiva Schaffer	Walt Disney Pictures; Mandeville Films; The Lonely Island	Traditional; CG animation Live-action		May 16, 2022 (Hollywood, California); May 20, 2022 (United States)	97 minutes
Crayon Shin-chan: Mononoke Ninja Chinpūden	Japan	Masakazu Hashimoto	Shin-Ei Animation	Traditional		April 22, 2022	100 minutes
DC League of Super-Pets	United States	Jared Stern; Sam Levine	Warner Bros. Warner Animation Group; DC Entertainment	CG animation		July 27, 2022 (Los Angeles); July 29, 2022 (United States)	105 minutes
Detective Conan: The Bride of Halloween	Japan	Susumu Mitsunaka	TMS Entertainment	Traditional		April 15, 2022	111 minutes
Diary of a Wimpy Kid: Rodrick Rules	United States; Canada	Luke Cormican	Walt Disney Pictures; Bardel Entertainment; 20th Century Animation	CG animation		December 2, 2022	75 minutes
Disenchanted	United States	Adam Shankman	Walt Disney Pictures; Josephson Entertainment; Right Coast Productions	Traditional; Live-action		November 16, 2022 (El Capitan Theatre); November 18, 2022 (United States)	119 minutes
Dolphin Boy	Iran; Germany; Russia; Turkey	Mohammad KheirAndish; Andrey Gogolev	SkyFrame Studio; Owj Arts and Media Organization; Saeno Production; Central Partnership	CG animation		April 7, 2022 (Russia)	85 minutes
Doraemon: Nobita's Little Star Wars 2021	Japan	Shin Yamaguchi	Shin-Ei Animation; Shirogumi	Traditional		March 4, 2022	108 minutes
Dounia and the Princess of Aleppo; Dounia et la Princesse d'Alep	Canada; France	André Kadi; Marya Zarif	Tobo Média	Flash animation		June 15, 2022 (Annecy); February 1, 2023 (France)	72 minutes
Dragon Ball Super: Super Hero	Japan	Akio Iyoku	Toei Animation	CG animation		June 11, 2022	99 minutes
Drifting Home	Japan	Hiroyasu Ishida	Studio Colorido	Traditional		September 16, 2022	119 minutes
El paraíso	Argentina	Fernando Sirianni; Federico Breser	FS Entertainment; Nomad Cine; EOK Producciones; McFly Studio	CG animation		September 8, 2022	103 minutes
Entergalactic	United Kingdom; United States	Fletcher Moules	Khalabo Ink Society; Netflix Animation; Mad Solar	CG animation Traditional		September 30, 2022	92 minutes
Ernest & Celestine: A Trip to Gibberitia	France; Luxembourg	Julien Chheng; Jean-Christophe Roger	Folivari; Melusine Productions; France TV Cinema; La Parti Productions; Les Armateurs	Traditional; Flash animation		December 14, 2022 (France)	80 minutes
Eternal Spring	Canada	Jason Loftus	Lofty Sky Entertainment	CG animation Traditional		March 15, 2022 (Thessaloniki)	86 minutes
The Earth Orchestra; Orkestra lurtarra	Spain	Joseba Ponce; Imanol Zinkunegi; Joe Lewis	Jarraituz Filmak AIE; Lotura Films	Flash animation		April 8, 2022	70 minutes
Fairytale	Russia; Belgium	Alexander Sokurov	Intonations	Multimedia; Live-action		August 6, 2022 (Locarno)	78 minutes
Fever	Chile; Peru; Brazil	Elisa Eliash	La Forma Cine; Válvula Films; Klaxon; Films Bastardía; Tiempo Libre	Live-action; Oil-painted; Traditional		October 11, 2022 (Valdivia); November 2022 (PÖFF); July 6, 2023 (Chile)	84 minutes
Finnick	Russia	Denis Chernov	Riki Group; Petersburg Animation Studio; Central Partnership	CG animation		March 23, 2022 (Moscow); March 24, 2022 (Russia)	85 minutes
Fireheart	Canada; France	Theodore Ty; Laurent Zeitoun	L'Atelier Animation; Anton; Caramel Films; Entertainment One	CG animation		February 2, 2022 (France); July 13, 2022 (Canada)	92 minutes
The First Slam Dunk	Japan	Takehiko Inoue	Toei Animation; Dandelion Animation Studio	Traditional		December 3, 2022	124 minutes
Fruits Basket: Prelude	Japan	Yoshihide Ibata	TMS Entertainment	Traditional		February 18, 2022	88 minutes
Goodbye, Don Glees!	Japan	Atsuko Ishizuka	Madhouse	Traditional		February 18, 2022	98 minutes
The Great Wolf Pack: A Call to Adventure	United States	Chris Bailey	Six Point Harness	Flash animation		September 3, 2022	45 minutes
Green Lantern: Beware My Power	United States	Jeff Wamester	Warner Bros. Animation; DC Entertainment	Traditional		July 22, 2022 (SDCC); July 26, 2022	75 minutes
Guillermo del Toro's Pinocchio	United States; Mexico	Guillermo del Toro; Mark Gustafson	Netflix Animation; The Jim Henson Company; ShadowMachine; Double Dare You Productions	Stop motion		October 15, 2022 (LFF); November 9, 2022 (United States); December 9, 2022 (Netflix)	117 minutes
Happy Heroes: The Stones	China	Weiming Huang	Alpha Group Co., Ltd. Youku Information Technology (Beijing); Guangdong Mingxing Chuangyi Cartoon	CG animation		July 22, 2026	96 minutes
The Haunted House: The Dimensional Goblin and the Seven Worlds 신비아파트: 차원도깨비와 7개의 세계	South Korea	Byun Young-kyu	CJ ENM Co. Studio BAZOOKA	Traditional		December 14, 2022	103 minutes
Home Is Somewhere Else	Mexico; United States	Carlos Hagerman; Jorge Villalobos	Brinca Animation Studio; Shine Global	Traditional; Flash animation		June 15, 2022 (Annecy); June 17, 2022 (Guadalajara); September 26, 2022 (AFI); May 4, 2023 (Mexico)	87 minutes
Hotel Transylvania: Transformania	United States	Jennifer Kluska; Derek Drymon	Columbia Pictures; Sony Pictures Animation; Amazon Studios	CG animation		January 14, 2022	87 minutes
How to Save the Immortal	Russia	Roman Artemyev	KinoAtis; CTB Film Company	CG animation		June 9, 2022	76 minutes
Huevitos congelados	Mexico	Gabriel Riva Palacio Alatriste; Rodolfo Riva Palacio Alatriste	Huevocartoon Producciones	CG animation		December 14, 2022	91 minutes
The House	United Kingdom	Paloma Baeza; Niki Lindroth von Bahr; Marc James Roels; Emma de Swaef	Netflix Animation; Nexus Studios	Stop motion		January 14, 2022	97 minutes
Icarus	Belgium; France; Luxembourg	Carlo Vogele	Iris Productions; Rezo Productions; Iris Films	CG animation Traditional		March 30, 2022	76 minutes
The Ice Age Adventures of Buck Wild	United States; Canada	John C. Donkin	Walt Disney Pictures; 20th Century Studios; 20th Century Animation	CG animation		January 28, 2022 (North America); March 25, 2022 (Worldwide)	82 minutes
Inspector Sun and the Curse of the Black Widow; El sol y la maldición de la viuda negra	Spain	Julio Soto Gúrpide	The Thinklab; Kapers Animation; Gordon Box; 3Doubles Producciones; Particular Crowd	CG animation		December 28, 2022 (Spain); October 13, 2023 (United States)	88 minutes
Journey to Yourland	Slovakia; Czech Republic; Belgium	Peter Budinský	plutoon BFILM.cz; The Pack; Radio and Television of Slovakia	CG animation		August 11, 2022	86 minutes
Just Super	Norway	Rasmus A. Sivertsen	Qvisten Animation	CG animation		September 10, 2022 (TIFF Junior); September 30, 2022	76 minutes
Kaguya-sama: Love Is War – The First Kiss That Never Ends	Japan	Mamoru Hatakeyama	A-1 Pictures	Traditional		December 17, 2022	100 minutes
Karagiozis: The Movie	Greece	Akis Karras	White Fox; Anama; Cosmote TV; Spentzos Film	CG animation		December 8, 2022	74 minutes
King Tweety	United States	Careen Ingle	Warner Bros. Animation	Flash animation		June 14, 2022 (DVD and digital); November 19, 2022 (Cartoon Network); November 20, 2022 (HBO Max)	72 minutes
Laid-Back Camp Movie	Japan	Yoshiaki Kyogoku	C-Station	Traditional		June 19, 2022 (Tokyo); July 1, 2022 (Japan)	120 minutes
Las leyendas: el origen	Mexico	Roberto Arnaiz	Ánima	Flash animation		August 10, 2022	85 minutes
Lego Star Wars: Summer Vacation	United States	Ken Cunningham	Lucasfilm Animation; The Lego Group; Atomic Cartoons	CG animation		August 5, 2022	48 minutes
Lightyear	United States	Angus MacLane	Disney; Pixar Animation Studios	CG animation		June 8, 2022 (El Capitan Theatre); June 17, 2022 (United States)	105 minutes
Little Allan - The Human Antenna	Denmark	Amalie Næsby Fick	Nordisk Film; Pop Up Production; Wil Film	CG animation		July 21, 2022	85 minutes
Little Nicholas: Happy As Can Be	France; Luxembourg; Canada	Amandine Fredon; Benjamin Massoubre	On Classics (Mediawan); Bidibul Productions	Traditional		May 20, 2022 (Cannes); October 12, 2022 (France)	82 minutes
Lonely Castle in the Mirror	Japan	Keiichi Hara	A-1 Pictures	Traditional		December 23, 2022	116 minutes
Luck	United States; Spain	Peggy Holmes	Apple TV+ Skydance Animation	CG animation		August 2, 2022 (Madrid); August 5, 2022 (United States)	105 minutes
Lyle, Lyle, Crocodile	United States	Will Speck; Josh Gordon	Columbia Pictures; 3000 Pictures; Hutch Parker Entertainment; Speck & Gordon	CG animation Live-action		October 2, 2022 (AMC Lincoln Square 13); October 7, 2022 (United States); November 4, 2022 (India)	106 minutes
Marmaduke	United States; Canada; South Korea; Hong Kong	Mark A.Z. Dippé; Matt Philip Whelan; Youngki Lee	Netflix; One Cool Animation; Andrews McMeel Entertainment; Legacy Classics Family Entertainment; StoryBerry	CG animation		May 6, 2022	88 minutes
Mechamato Movie	Malaysia	Nizam Razak	Animonsta Studios; Astro Shaw	CG animation		December 8, 2022 (Malaysia & Brunei); March 1, 2023 (Indonesia); March 9, 2023 (Singapore)	122 minutes (theatrical); 123 minutes (Astro On Demand)
Mia and Me: The Hero of Centopia	Germany; Australia; Belgium; India	Adam Gunn	Studio 100 Animation; Studio B Animation; Broadvision Services; Flying Bark Productions; Constantin Film; Hahn Film AG	CG animation Live-action		May 26, 2022	85 minutes
Minions: The Rise of Gru	United States	Kyle Balda; Brad Ableson	Universal Pictures; Illumination	CG animation		June 13, 2022 (Annecy); July 1, 2022 (United States)	87 minutes
Mortal Kombat Legends: Snow Blind	United States	Rick Morales	Warner Bros. Animation	Traditional		October 9, 2022	82 minutes
My Big Big Friend - The Movie; Meu AmigãoZão - O Filme	Brazil	Andrés Lieban	O2 Play; 2DLab	Flash animation		May 12, 2022	76 minutes
My Fairy Troublemaker; Meine Chaosfee & ich	Germany; Luxembourg	Caroline Origer	Fabrique d'Images; Ella Filmproduktion; SERU Animation	CG animation		October 13, 2022	85 minutes
My Father's Dragon	Ireland; United States	Nora Twomey	Netflix Animation; Cartoon Saloon; Mockingbird Pictures; Parallel Films	Traditional		October 8, 2022 (LFF); November 4, 2022 (Ireland/United States/United Kingdom); November 11, 2022 (Netflix)	99 minutes
My Father's Secrets	France; Belgium	Véra Belmont	Je Suis Bien Content	Traditional		August 6, 2022 (Angoulême Francophone Film Festival); September 21, 2022 (France)	74 minutes
My Grandfather's Demons	Portugal; Spain; France	Nuno Beato	Sardinha em Lata; Midralgar; Basque Films; Caretos Film	Stop motion CG animation		June 14, 2022 (Annecy); September 21, 2022 (France); June 22, 2023 (Portugal)	90 minutes
My Love Affair with Marriage	Latvia; United States; Luxembourg	Signe Baumane	Studio Locomotive; The Marriage Project; Antevita Films	Traditional; Stop motion		June 11, 2022 (Tribeca Festival)	108 minutes
My Sweet Monster	Russia	Viktor Glukhushin; Maksim Volkov	CTB Film Company; Skazka Animation Studio; Cinema Fund; Luminescence	CG animation		October 6, 2021 (Netherlands); April 28, 2022 (Russia)	98 minutes
Nahuel and the Magic Book; Nahuel y el Libro Mágico	Chile; Brazil	Germán Acuña Delgadillo	Carburadores; Punkrobot; Levante Films; Red Animation Studios; Dragão Studios; LMS Animation Studios; Draftoon Animation Studio; Latido Films	Traditional		June 15, 2020 (Annecy); April 9, 2021 (SIFF); January 20, 2022 (Chile)	99 minutes
Nayola	Portugal; France; Belgium; Netherlands	José Miguel Ribeiro	Praça Filmes; S.O.I.L. Productions; JPL Films il Luster; Luna Blue Film	Traditional		June 13, 2022 (Annecy); November 21, 2022 (Bucheon); March 8, 2023 (France); March 31, 2023 (Angola); April 2, 2023 (CIFF); April 13, 2023 (Portugal)	83 minutes
New Gods: Yang Jian	China	Zhao Ji	Light Chaser Animation Studios; Bilibili	CG animation		August 19, 2022	116 minutes
Night at the Museum: Kahmunrah Rises Again	United States	Matt Danner	Walt Disney Pictures; 21 Laps Entertainment; Atomic Cartoons; Alibaba Pictures	Traditional; Flash animation		December 9, 2022	77 minutes
No Dogs or Italians Allowed (Interdit aux chiens et aux italiens)	France; Belgium; Switzerland; Italy; Portugal	Alain Ughetto	Les Films du Tambour de Soie; Vivement Lundi; Foliascope	Stop Motion		June 15, 2022 (Annecy); January 25, 2023 (France)	70 minutes
The Nutcracker and the Magic Flute	Russia; Hungary	Georgi Gitis, Viktor Glukhushin	CTB Film Company; Luminescence Kft	CG animation		December 8, 2022	90 minutes
Odd Taxi: In the Woods	Japan	Baku Kinoshita	OLM Team Yoshioka; P.I.C.S	Traditional		April 1, 2022	128 minutes
Oink	Netherlands	Mascha Halberstad	Viking Film	Stop motion		February 10, 2022 (Berlin Film Festival); July 13, 2022 (Netherlands)	72 minutes
One Piece Film: Red	Japan	Gorō Taniguchi	Toei Animation	Traditional		July 22, 2022 (Tokyo premiere); August 6, 2022 (Japan)	115 minutes
The Other Shape; La otra forma	Colombia; Brazil	Diego Felipe Guzmán	RTVC Play; Hierro Animación; Estúdio GIZ; Dinamita Animación	Traditional		2022	99 minutes
Pattie and the Wrath of Poseidon	France	David Alaux	TAT Productions; Kinology; Frances 3 Cinéma	CG animation		October 26, 2022 (Cinemed Festival Cinéma Méditerranéen Montpellier); January 25, 2023 (France); February 10, 2023 (United Kingdom); April 5, 2024 (United States)	95 minutes
Paws of Fury: The Legend of Hank	United States; United Kingdom; China	Rob Minkoff; Mark Koetsier	Paramount Pictures; Nickelodeon Movies; Aniventure; Align; Brooksfilms; Flying Tigers Entertainment; GFM Animation; HB Wink Animation	CG animation		July 10, 2022 (Los Angeles); July 15, 2022 (United States); July 22, 2022 (United Kingdom)	98 minutes
Perlimps	Brazil	Alê Abreu	Buriti Filmes; Globo Filmes; Gloob; Sony Pictures Television	Traditional		June 16, 2022 (France); February 9, 2023 (Brazil)	75 minutes
Pinkfong Sing-Along Movie 2: Wonderstar Concert	South Korea; United States	Sukyoung Kim	The Pinkfong Company	CG animation		December 21, 2022 (South Korea); December 23, 2022 (Taiwan); January 26, 2023 (Hong Kong); January 28/29, 2023 (United States); February 3, 2023 (Singapore); March 10, 2023 (Turkey)	75 minutes
Pinocchio: A True Story	Russia	Vasily Rovensky	Licensing Brands LLC; Cinema Fund Russia; Sony Pictures Productions and Releasing	CG animation		December 23, 2021 (United Arab Emirates); February 17, 2022 (Russia); March 22, 2022 (United States)	94 minutes
Pleasant Goat and Big Big Wolf: Dunk for Future	China	Huang Weiming; Huang Junming; Chen Lijin	Alpha Group; Creative Power Entertaining; Shanghai Tao Piao Piao Movie and TV Culture; Zhejiang Dong Yang Microcosmic Pictures; Youku Information Technology (Beijing); Guangdong Mingxing Chuangyi Cartoon; Universe Century Film Distribution; Beijing Weimeng Chuangke Network Technology	Flash animation		February 1, 2022	94 minutes
Pororo and Friends: Virus Busters 뽀로로와 친구들: 바이러스를 없애줘!	South Korea	Youngkyun Park		CG animation		December 1, 2022	62 minutes
Pororo: Dragon Castle Adventure 뽀로로 극장판 드래곤캐슬 대모험	South Korea	Yoon Je-wan; Seunghoon Kang	OCON Studios	CG animation		July 28, 2022	70 minutes
Puss in Boots: The Last Wish	United States	Joel Crawford	Universal Pictures; DreamWorks Animation	CG animation		December 13, 2022 (Lincoln Center); December 21, 2022 (United States)	102 minutes
The Quintessential Quintuplets Movie	Japan	Masato Jinbo	Bibury Animation Studios	Traditional		May 20, 2022	136 minutes
Rabbit Academy: Mission Eggpossible; Die Häschenschule - Der große Eierklau	Germany	Ute von Münchow-Pohl	Akkord Film Produktion GmbH	CG animation		March 13, 2022 (Hamburg, premiere); March 17, 2022 (Germany)	76 minutes
Rise of the Teenage Mutant Ninja Turtles: The Movie	United States	Ant Ward; Andy Suriano	Netflix; Nickelodeon Movies; New Republic Pictures	Traditional		August 5, 2022	82 minutes
Scrooge: A Christmas Carol	United Kingdom	Stephen Donnelly	Netflix Animation; Timeless Films	CG animation		November 18, 2022 (United States); December 2, 2022 (United Kingdom)	96 minutes
The Sea Beast	United States; Canada	Chris Williams	Netflix Animation	CG animation		June 24, 2022 (Limited theatrical release); July 8, 2022 (Netflix)	115 minutes
The Seven Deadly Sins: Grudge of Edinburgh Part 1	Japan	Noriyuki Abe (Note: Credited as Chief Director (総監督, Sō Kantoku)); Bob Shirahata	Alfred Imageworks; Marvy Jack	Traditional		December 20, 2022	52 minutes
The Soccer Football Movie	United States	Mitch Schauer	Netflix; Splash Entertainment	CG animation		November 9, 2022	73 minutes
Sonic the Hedgehog 2	United States; Japan; Canada	Jeff Fowler	Paramount Pictures; Original Film; Sega; Blur Studio; Marza Animation Planet	CG animation Live-action		March 30, 2022 (International); April 5, 2022 (Regency Village Theatre); April 8, 2022 (United States)	122 minutes
Space Battleship Yamato 2205: A New Journey Part 2: Stasha	Japan	Kenji Yasuda	Satelight; Staple Entertainment	Traditional		February 4, 2022	102 minutes
Strange World	United States	Don Hall	Walt Disney Animation Studios	CG animation		November 15, 2022 (El Capitan Theatre); November 23, 2022 (United States)	102 minutes
Supreme Motherhood: The Journey of Mata Sahib Kaur	India	Karandeep Singh	iRealities Studios; Nihal Nihal Nihal Productions	CG animation		April 14, 2022	100 minutes
Suzume	Japan	Makoto Shinkai	CoMix Wave Films	Traditional		November 11, 2022	122 minutes
Tad the Lost Explorer and the Curse of the Mummy; Tadeo Jones 3: La tabla esmeralda	Spain	Enrique Gato	Lightbox Animation Studios; Telecinco Cinema	CG animation		August 24, 2022 (France); August 26, 2022 (Spain)	90 minutes
Tarsilinha	Brazil	Célia Catunda; Kiko Mistrorigo	H2O Films; Pinguim Content	CG animation		March 15, 2022	89 minutes
Teasing Master Takagi-san: The Movie	Japan	Hiroaki Akagi	Shin-Ei Animation	Traditional		June 4, 2022 (Chiyoda City); June 10, 2022 (Japan)	73 minutes
Teen Titans Go! & DC Super Hero Girls: Mayhem in the Multiverse	United States	Matt Peters; Katie Rice	Warner Bros. Animation; DC Entertainment	Flash animation		May 24, 2022 (DVD & Blu-ray); May 28, 2022 (Cartoon Network)	79 minutes
TeraStorm	Kenyan	Andrew Kaggia	Afrikana Digital	CG animation		November 24, 2022	88 minutes
Titina	Norway; Belgium	Kajsa Næss	Mikrofilm AS; Vivi Film	Traditional		October 21, 2022 (Norway); February 8, 2023 (France)	91 minutes
To Every You I've Loved Before 僕が愛したすべての君へ	Japan	Jun Matsumoto	Bakken Record	Traditional		September 14, 2022 (Tokyo); October 7, 2022 (Japan)	102 minutes
To Me, the One Who Loved You 君を愛したひとりの僕へ	Japan	Kenichi Kasai	TMS Entertainment	Traditional		September 14, 2022 (Tokyo); October 7, 2022 (Japan)	98 minutes
Toldi - Movie; Toldi, a mozifilm	Hungary	Marcell Jankovics; Lajos Csákovics	Kecskemétfilm	Traditional		October 20, 2022 (Hungary)	108 minutes
Tom and Jerry: Cowboy Up!	United States	Darrell Van Citters	Warner Bros. Animation; Turner Entertainment	Flash animation		January 25, 2022	71 minutes
Tom and Jerry: Snowman's Land	United States	Darrell Van Citters	Warner Bros. Animation; Turner Entertainment	Flash animation		November 15, 2022 (Digital); November 29, 2022 (DVD)	76 minutes
Transylvanian Legendarium	Hungary; Romania	Szabolcs Fazakas	Legendarium Animation Studio	3D animation 2D animation		March 3, 2022 (Hungary)	80 minutes
Trick or Treat Scooby-Doo!	United States	Cecilia Aranovich	Warner Bros. Animation	Traditional		October 4, 2022 (Digital); October 18, 2022 (DVD)	72 minutes
Trunk Train: The Movie; Tromba Trem: O Filme	Brazil	Zé Brandão	Vitrine Filmes; Copa Studio	Flash animation		September 8, 2022	94 minutes
The Tunnel to Summer, the Exit of Goodbyes 夏へのトンネル、さよならの出口	Japan	Tomohisa Taguchi	Clap Animation Studio; Pony Canyon	Traditional		September 9, 2022	83 minutes
Turning Red	United States	Domee Shi	Disney; Pixar Animation Studios	CG animation		March 1, 2022 (Everyman Borough Yards); March 11, 2022 (United States); February 9, 2024 (United States; theatrical)	100 minutes
Two Tiny Toddlers: A Unforgettable Day	Netherlands	Wip Vernooij	Nuts & Bolts Film Company; Submarine; Vosound	CG animation		April 27, 2022 (Netherlands); May 1, 2022 (Belgium)	67 minutes
Unicorn Wars	Spain; France	Alberto Vázquez	Abano Producións; Uniko; Autour de Minuit; Schmuby Productions	Traditional		June 16, 2022 (Annecy); October 21, 2022 (Spain); December 28, 2022 (France)	92 minutes
Wendell & Wild	United States	Henry Selick	Netflix Animation; Gotham Group; Monkeypaw Productions	Stop motion		September 11, 2022 (TIFF); October 21, 2022 (United States); October 28, 2022 (Netflix)	105 minutes
Yuku and the Flower of the Himalayas; Yuku et la Fleur de l'Himalaya	France; Belgium; Switzerland	Arnaud Demuynck; Rémi Durin	Vivement Lundi! Les Films du Nord; Artémis Productions; La Boîte... Productions; Nadasdy Film	Flash animation		April 15, 2022 (TV premiere); October 19, 2022 (Belgium) & (France)	65 minutes

== Highest-grossing animated films ==
The following is a list of the 10 highest-grossing animated feature films first released in 2022.

Rank	Title	Distributor	Worldwide gross	Ref
1	Minions: The Rise of Gru	Universal Pictures	$940,628,210	
2	Puss in Boots: The Last Wish	Universal Pictures	$485,261,639	
3	Suzume	Toho Company, Ltd.	$324,471,027	
4	The First Slam Dunk	Toei Company	$279,181,229	
5	The Bad Guys	Universal Pictures	$250,666,997	
6	One Piece Film: Red	Toei Company	$246,570,000	
7	Lightyear	Walt Disney Studios Motion Pictures	$226,425,420	
8	DC League of Super-Pets	Warner Bros. Pictures	$207,457,117	
9	Boonie Bears: Back to Earth	Hainan Heguang Film	$150,960,000	
10	Dragon Ball Super: Super Hero	Toei Company	$86,562,140	

=== Box office records ===
- 2022 is the first year since 2020 to have an animated film gross over $500 million and the first year since 2019 to have an animated film to gross over $600, $700, $800 and $900 million.
- The Despicable Me and Shrek franchises became the first and second animated film franchises to gross more than $4 billion with the release of Minions: The Rise of Gru and Puss in Boots: The Last Wish.
- Minions: The Rise of Gru is the fifth-highest-grossing film of 2022 with a worldwide total of $940.6 million, as well as the highest grossing animated film released during the COVID-19 pandemic, surpassing the 2020 film Demon Slayer: Kimetsu no Yaiba – The Movie: Mugen Train.
- The anime films Suzume and The First Slam Dunk set several box office records.
  - In South Korea, The First Slam Dunk became the highest-grossing anime film, before its record was surpassed by Suzume.
  - In China, Suzume became the highest-grossing anime film. It also set the record for the biggest opening for an anime film in China, before its record was surpassed by The First Slam Dunk.
  - The First Slam Dunk also set Chinese box office records for the highest pre-sales for an animated import, and the largest IMAX opening weekend for a foreign animated film.

== See also ==
- List of animated television series of 2022
