= Brazilian animation =

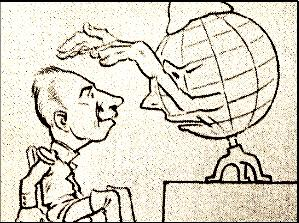
Frame of "Kaiser" (1917)

The history of Brazilian animation is relatively recent. In the first half of the 20th century, there were some small experiments produced in animation without much continuity, to the emergence of several animated films in the other half of the century. The 21st century saw the advent of many animated series for television.

== 1910s–1960s ==
Since 1907, Brazilian theaters already presented animated vignettes at the closing of the newsreels.

Kaiser was the first Brazilian autonomous animation. The animated short film was exhibited in 1917 during World War I. The animation was created by cartoonist Álvaro Marins, better known as Seth, and satirirized the German Emperor Wilhelm II with which Brazil declared war in that year.

Kirs Film released the second animated film Traquinices de Chiquinho e seu inseparável amigo Jagûnço (The Escapades of Chiquinho and His Inseparable Friend Jagûnço) on April 26, 1917. In 1918, Avênturas de Bille e Bolle (The Adventures of Bille and Bolle), by Gilberto Rossi and Eugênio Fonsêca Filho, was released, inspired in the characters Mutt and Jeff of Bud Fisher.

In the following ten years, Seth was the main animator. He focused on advertising. In 1929, it was released Macaco fêio, macaco bônito (Ugly Monkey, Pretty Monkey), a film co-directed by Seth's collaborator João Stamato and Luiz Seel. This is the oldest surviving animated film in the country.

Between 1938 and 1939, the caricaturist Luiz Sá released the short-film Avênturas de Virgolino (The Adventures of Virgolino) and Virgolino apânha (Virgolino’s Troubles). Brazilian cinema pioneer Humberto Mauro (1897–1983) introduced the use of animated puppets in Brazil with O dragãozinho manso (The Good Little Dragon) in the 1940s.

In 1940, the brothers Anélio and Mario Latini Filho did their short-film, Azares de Lulu (Lulu's Misfortune), with a style that resembles the Fleischer Brothers and with a rudimentary technique. Anélio learned about animation techniques by reading manuals and watching North American movies. He asked the Brazilian screenwriter Joaquim Ribeiro a folkloric subject. Ribeiro gave him seven legends of the Amazon Indians, that would be the base for the Sinfônia amazônica (Amazon Symphony), which was the first feature-length animated film made in the country. Filmed in black and white, it took 6 years to be completed because it was conducted solely by Anélio Latini, without the help of any other animator. Anélio's brother helped as photographer and wrote the musical score of a samba in the film. Despite good reviews and large audiences, the film was not able to profit.

Norman McLaren inspired several Brazilian animators between the 1950s and 1960s. In 1957, Roberto Miller produced Rumba after a six-month stay with McLaren in Canada. Miller continued into animation with Boogie Woogie (1959), Desenho abstrato (Abstract Drawing, 1960), O átomo brincalhão (The Playful Atom, 1968) and Fotograma Abstrato (Abstract Frame, 1985).

Rubens Francisco Lucchetti and Bassano Vaccarini created Abstrações (Abstractions), and Fantasmagóricas (1961) using painting on film stock and other avant-garde techniques. They founded Centro Experimental de Cinema de Ribeirão Preto that was out of business due to financial problems after a couple of years.

In 1962, Hamilton de Souza created with other friends Grupo Tan Tan. He made the short-film Uma história do Brazil – tipo exportação (A History of Brazil – Made for Export). He worked on História da América (History of America), which was planned in three segments of half-hour. However, only the first segment, A descoberta (The Discovery), was completed.

During the 1960s, animation began to have a regular presence in advertising. Wilson Pinto created the mascot of the oil company Petrobrás, Ruy Peroti drew the toucan for the airline Varig; and Guy Lebrun conceived the character for Brejeiro rice.

== 1970s–1990s ==
During the 1970s, Brazilian production in animation increased. Main animation studios concentrated in São Paulo such as Briquet Productions, Daniel Messias, Walbercy Ribas and Maurício de Sousa Productions.

In February 1971, the second animated Brazilian feature Presente de Natal was released in Manaus, produced by Álvaro Henriques Gonçalves. This animated featured film was also the first in color in Brazil. In 1972, Piconzé was released in theaters, made by the Japanese cartoonist Ypê Nakashima (1926–1974), who immigrated to Brazil in 1956 and worked with animation in advertising.

In this decade the Monica's Gang comics, which have become quite popular among younger audiences in the region, were adapted to numerous animated films over the years resulting in a TV show a few years later. Some other animated films were also produced during the 1980s and 1990s, however in 1996 the most outstanding film was Cassiopeia, which was the first Brazilian animated film to be computer-animated, a year after the release of the Pixar film Toy Story as well as the second computer-animated film of all time.

== 2000s–present ==
A great advance in Brazilian animations occurred in recent years. Several awarded films have emerged in the first decade as The Happy Cricket (and its sequel The Happy Cricket and the Giant Bugs), Xuxinha e Guto contra os Monstros do Espaço, Uma Aventura no Tempo, Brichos, Garoto Cósmico, and several TV series such as Anabel, Fudêncio, As Aventuras de Gui & Estopa and Fishtronaut. The series Doggy Day School and My Big Big Friend were the first animated series to be co-produced with foreign countries, Canada as was the case for both.

With a law created by the Brazilian organization ANCINE in 2011 several cable children's channels were forced to develop Brazilian original series, mostly cartoons. Among the best known cartoons in Brazil today include Sítio do Picapau Amarelo, Monica's Gang, Haunted Tales for Wicked Kids and Jorel's Brother.

On 28 december of 2006 a vídeo called "Galinha Pintadinha" was released and later became Lottie Dottie Chicken and became one of the most famous animations on brazil

The feature films Rio 2096: A Story of Love and Fury and The Boy and the World, have won international awards outside Brazil and were both respectively winners of the 2013 and 2014 editions of the Annecy International Animated Film Festival. The Boy and the World was released in more than 50 countries and became the first Brazilian animated film to be nominated for Best Animated Feature at the Academy Awards.

In 2018, Netflix released worldwide its first Brazilian children's animated television series Cupcake & Dino: General Services (A co-production with Canada) and its first Brazilian adult animated television series Super Drags.

== See also ==
- Brazilian comics
- List of Brazilian animated films
- Anima Mundi (event)
