= Between Frames: The Art of Brazilian Animation =

2013 documentary film directed by Eduardo Calvet

- Theatrical release poster
- Directed by: Eduardo Calvet
- Written by: Eduardo Calvet
- Produced by: Felipe Haurelhuk
- Cinematography: Roberto Riva
- Edited by: Fernando Mendonça; Bruno Torres
- Music by: Renato Alencar
- Production companies: Ideograph; Canal Brasil
- Release date: September 2013 (Brazil)
- Running time: 99 minutes
- Country: Brazil
- Language: Portuguese

Between Frames: The Art of Brazilian Animation — released in Brazil as Luz, Anima, Ação — is a 2013 Brazilian documentary film directed and written by Eduardo Calvet. The film recalls the memory of almost 100 years of history of Brazilian animation, revealing the main personalities who helped to build this trajectory and remembering landmarks and creations of all times from films, TV and advertising.

== Synopsis ==
The film makes an overview of animation in Brazil, since the first animation created in 1917, called The Kaiser, until the success of the animation film series Ice Age and Rio, each directed by Carlos Saldanha. Besides him, other big names were also heard, like Maurício de Souza, Otto Guerra and Chico Liberato, who report their experiences on the market and give a current panorama of Brazilian production.

== Cast ==
- Alê Abreu as himself
- Diego Akel as himself
- Guilherme Alvernaz as himself
- Alceu Baptistão as himself
- Telmo Carvalho as himself
- Celia Catunda as herself
- César Coelho as himself
- Maurício de Sousa as himself
- Marcelo Fabri Marão as himself
- Arnaldo Galvão as himself
- Otto Guerra as himself
- Pedro Iuá as himself
- Paulo José as himself
- Olívia Latini as herself
- Chico Liberato as himself
- Andrés Lieban as himself
- Marcos Magalhães as himself
- Roberto Maia as himself
- Daniel Messias as himself
- Kiko Mistrorigo as himself
- Antônio Moreno as himself
- Paulo Munhoz as himself
- Itsuo Nakashima as himself
- José Mario Parrot as himself
- Aída Queiroz as herself
- Walbercy Ribas as himself
- Quia Rodrígues as himself
- Rosaria as herself
- Carlos Saldanha as himself
- Allan Sieber as himself
- Maurício Squarisi as himself
- Pedro Stilpen as himself
- Ennio Torresan as himself
- Rosana Urbes as herself
- Fabio Yamaji as himself

== See also ==
- List of Brazilian animated films
