= Kaiser (film) =

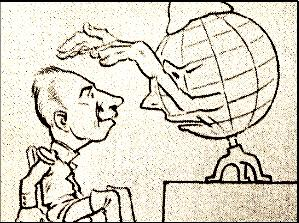
- The only surviving frame from Kaiser, by Álvaro Marins, the Seth.
- Directed by: Álvaro Marins
- Release date: January 22, 1917
- Running time: Unknown
- Country: Brazil
- Language: Silent

Kaiser is a lost propaganda short animated film, directed by the cartoonist Álvaro Marins, the Seth, in 1917. It is considered the first cartoon produced in Brazil.

== Plot ==
The film premiered on January 22, 1917, at Cine Pathé in Rio de Janeiro, months before Brazil declared war on Germany and started its participation in World War I. It consisted of a political cartoon, showing the emperor Wilhelm II putting on his head a helmet that represented world domination. Then, a terrestrial globe grew and swallowed the German leader.

== Context ==
Since 1907 the Brazilian cinemas already presented/displayed animated vignettes in the closure of the newsreels. However, Kaiser was the first Brazilian autonomous animation to be shown. The whereabouts of the work were already unknown 20 years after its release.

The film was not preserved and is now a lost film, leaving only a still frame.

== Legacy ==
Unfortunately, the film was not preserved and was lost forever, leaving only a reference image of the work. To honor the artist and his creation, the director of the film Luz, Anima, Ação, Eduardo Calvet, invited 8 Brazilian animators of different techniques: Marão (traditional), Zé Brandão (digital 2D), Still (animation on paper), Pedro Iuá (clay), Marcos Magalhães (animation in film), Diego Akel (pixilation), Fábio Yamaji (light painting) and Rosana Urbes (metalanguage).

It was shown in August at Anima Mundi 2013.

== See also ==
- History of Brazilian animation
- Brazil during World War I
