= Garoto Cósmico =

2007 Brazilian animated film directed by Alê Abreu

Garoto Cósmico EN: Worldturner Circus
- Directed by: Alê Abreu
- Screenplay by: Alê Abreu; Sabina Anzuategui; Daniel Chaia; Gustavo Kurlat
- Starring: Aleph Naldi; Bianca Rayen; Mateus Duarte; Raul Cortez
- Edited by: Cristina Amaral
- Music by: Gustavo Kurlat
- Production company: Estúdio Elétrico
- Distributed by: Downtown Filmes
- Release dates: 2007 (Anima Mundi); January 11, 2008
- Running time: 76 minutes
- Country: Brazil
- Language: Portuguese
- Budget: R$ 2 million

Garoto Cósmico (English: Cosmic Boy), English localized title Worldturner Circus, is a 2007 Brazilian animated musical science fantasy comedy film directed by Alê Abreu (in his feature directorial debut), the same creative mind behind the Academy Award-nominated Boy and the World. This whimsical and thought-provoking movie invites viewers on a journey filled with cosmic wonder, philosophical ponderings, and a gentle call to question the established norms. The film debuted at the 2007 Anima Mundi, and was theatrically released in Brazil on January 11, 2008.

The film featured several Brazilian singers and actors such as Arnaldo Antunes, Vanessa da Mata, Wellington Nogueira and Belchior. It was the last film in which the actor Raul Cortez participated, voicing the character Giramundos.

== Plot ==
Taking place in the near future, in the year 2973, the story centers around Cósmico ("Cosmic" in Brazilian Portuguese), his adopted sister Luna ("Moon" in Brazilian Portuguese), and their friend Maninho ("Little Brother" in Brazilian Portuguese), who live in a futuristic, highly structured society called the "Children's Planet", a world within Solar System 54, which itself is located within Galaxy 7 (which itself is located within the universe). A land obsessed with "programming" (another word for order and productivity), the kids are essentially cogs in a machine, living lives dictated by routines and schedules. Everything is calculated, everything is predetermined, and free thought is subtly discouraged. They do what they are meant to do, and they go about their daily lives following the same schedule that appears on their watches: study, eat, sleep, and study all over again. Within the drab and mundane routine of the planet lies a rule: whoever reaches 10,000 points (which are earned through productivity) will reach the final phase in their metamorphosis: the Planet of Adult Children. And after receiving special training on the super-complex spaceship of the planet's representative, a superhero and Space TV mogul named Captain Program (whom the kids idolize), they will receive a super-complex programming watch just like his, and a certificate for being super-complex adults.

One night, while attempting to sneak into the school's restricted area in hopes of studying more information, a string of mishaps leave them nearly stranded on a space station, far from the reaches of the Children's Planet. As the kids try to find some ways on how to get home, the children stumble upon an abandoned spaceship, along with a small, green cat-like creature nicknamed "Bicho" ("Creature" in Brazilian Portuguese), whom the kids encounter and befriend. Mistaking the creature for a pilot, the kids ask him to take them back to the Children's Planet; the ship is activated, launching themselves into a bewildering cosmic odyssey. Through their travels across the galaxy, the three discover a planet filled with sunflowers, not before nearly getting lost in space. After crash landing, the kids discover the whereabouts of this planet, where they soon find a tiny traveling fair called the Worldturner Circus, led by a jovial entertainer named Giramundos ("Worldturner" in Brazilian Portuguese) and his troupe, such as a magician, a bogeyman made of chewing gum, and a clown who can be anything that he wants, such as a dolphin, a giant, and a ball. The kids hesitate to join the circus at first, for fear of falling behind on their schedule, and they ask Gira to send them back home. However, the jovial entertainer is only focused on entertaining the crowd; he also tells the kids of Murkmass, a giant, smoky monster whose only sustenance is darkness, death, torture, and destruction. He patrols Galaxy 7 and he never hesitates to punish those who break the system, and that he's been looking for the Worldturner Circus for decades. As the troupe is getting ready to perform, the kids try their best to escape, but they forget about escaping after slowly getting to know Gira's performers, as they find themselves taking a liking to the bizarre and psychedelic opportunities that the circus has to offer. They begin learning new things that they have never learned before, and they discover a multitude of different realms and infinite universes within the train wagons of the circus, such as a dressing room wagon (where the kids receive a makeover), a wagon with avant-garde art that makes sounds every time they say the art or step on the art, a wagon of endless blue skies and puffy white clouds, a wagon of colorful tickles, a farm-carrying fruit wagon, and an arts-and-crafts wagon full of sentient toys. As their stay progresses, they encounter strange and fascinating beings, witness celestial phenomena, and grapple with profound questions about existence, freedom, and the true meaning of life. They realize that the rigid world they left behind is just one perspective, and the universe offers a vast array of possibilities.

After living new experiences and having the time of their lives, the world of programming sends none other than their special representative Captain Program to bring them back. The kids, overjoyed at first now that their favorite idol has come to bring them home, begin to see the captain as the "hero" he really is after he forces them to play a virtual reality game that involves shooting a bunch of scary monsters, which are revealed to be the members of the circus. Captain Program, who reveals his true colors as a selfish and arrogant narcissist, abandons the kids in space after finding out that they failed to complete the game, but not before deeming them "deactivated children". As the kids begin to lose hope at the idea of never becoming super-complex adults, Bicho and one of the traveling fair's members arrive in the nick of time to save them. Upon their return, the trio explain to Giramundos their recent dilemma, and the latter cheers the kids up after revealing that he too was a member of the Children's Planet, and he too was deactivated. But he learned not to let his worries get the better of him and to focus on the simple things in life, as he learned that all life is precious and that life has endless possibilities. Following this pep-talk, the circus is just about to perform, when Murkmass starts wreaking havoc, having already found the fair's location. He uses his powers to try and make the fish in the circus's moat to attack the troupe, but Cósmico and Bicho overpower them with chocolate balls. Enraged, Murkmass tries tackling Gira after he gets intimidated, and when Cósmico tries stopping the beast by telling him to pick on someone his own size, he gets swallowed by Murkmass in the blink of an eye, further plunging the circus into even more despair. Just when all hope seems lost, Cósmico is able to free himself from the belly of Murkmass by using his imagination, and applying everything that he experienced, now realizing that he and his friends can live freely without any constraint, with no need to live out their lives like a computer program. This act causes Murkmass to rip his stomach open in agony, causing Cósmico to fall from the sky and safely land. Happiness is brought back to the Worldturner Circus, and the kids and their newfound friends make a joyful romp, which surprisingly vanquishes Murkmass, as imagination and wonder are his weakness, as opposed to darkness and destruction, which he feeds on.

With Murkmass defeated, Galaxy 7 is free from the monster's dictatorship, the Worldturner Circus is once again at peace, and Cósmico, Luna, and Maninho accept themselves as official members of the traveling fair. Giramundos and his new friends leave the sunflower planet and head off on a new adventure, and the movie ends with one final look at the trio's abandoned programming watches floating in space, before giving the audience one last shot at Galaxy 7.

== See also ==
- Boy and the World
