= As Aventuras de Gui & Estopa =

Brazilian animated television series

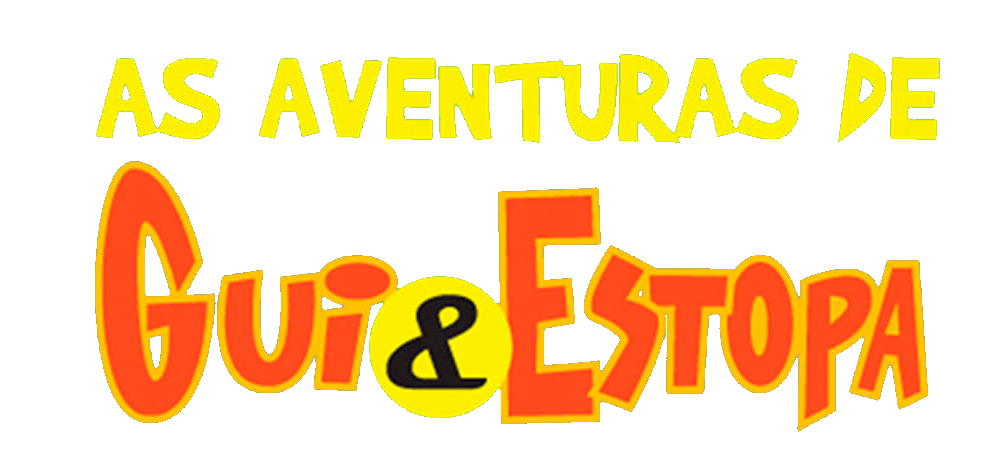
- The series' logo.
- Also known as: Gui & Estopa
- Genre: Comedy; Slapstick; Surreal comedy Satire; Parody
- Created by: Mariana Caltabiano
- Based on: Iguinho by Mariana Caltabiano
- Written by: Mariana Caltabiano; Eduardo Checkerdimian (season 1); Eduardo Jardim (season 1); Bruno Checkerdimian (seasons 1–3); Alexandre Augusto Ferreira (season 3)
- Directed by: Mariana Caltabiano
- Creative director: Mariana Caltabiano
- Voices of: Mariana Caltabiano; Eduardo Jardim; Arly Cardoso; Ricardo Aidar; Thomas Barreto
- Theme music composer: Arly Cardoso; Thomas Barreto
- Opening theme: "As Aventuras de Gui & Estopa Theme"
- Composers: Arly Cardoso; Thomas Barreto
- Country of origin: Brazil
- Original language: Portuguese
- No. of seasons: 5
- No. of episodes: 92

Production
- Executive producers: Ricardo Aidar (seasons 1–2); Marcelo Castro (season 1); Mariana Caltabiano (seasons 3–5); Thais Bastos (season 3)
- Editors: Ihon Yadoya (seasons 2–3); Augusto Medeiros (season 4); Renan Máximo (seasons 4–5)
- Running time: 1–3 minutes (seasons 1–3); 3–7 minutes (seasons 4–5)
- Production company: Mariana Caltabiano Criações

Original release
- Network: Cartoon Network; Tooncast; TV Cultura; Boomerang; YouTube (season 5)
- Release: April 26, 2008 – March 9, 2020

As Aventuras de Gui & Estopa (also known as Gui & Estopa) is a Brazilian animated television series created by Mariana Caltabiano, and shown on Cartoon Network Brazil. The characters were originally created for a children's website called Iguinho in 1996, which developed into a cartoon over the years. It aired on Cartoon Network Brazil from April 26, 2008 to March 9, 2020.

The series is a satire of several cartoons of popular culture, including Cartoon Network original shows, through slapstick and nonsense comedy. The show is also broadcast by the channels Boomerang, Tooncast and TV Cultura, and available on HBO Max in Latin America.

The first season premiered on April 26, 2008, followed by the second on April 24, 2010, the third on November 13, 2011, the fourth on September 7, 2015, and the fifth on YouTube on December 9, 2019 and on Boomerang on April 5, 2021.

== Characters ==
- Iguinho/Gui (voiced by Mariana Caltabiano) – The main protagonist. An arrogant and dumb young dog resembling a West highland white terrier.
- Estopa (voiced by Eduardo Jardim) – Gui's best friend. A stupid fat dog who only thinks in food.
- Cróquete (voiced by Mariana Caltabiano) – Gui's girlfriend. She is a charming Cocker Spaniel.
- Pitiburro "Piti" (voiced by Eduardo Jardim) – Gui's frenemy and main rival. An arrogant and coarse Pit bull.
- Róquete (voiced by Mariana Caltabiano) - A snooty Spaniel who is Cróquete's cousin.
- Dona Iguilda (voiced by Mariana Caltabiano) - A female West Highland White Terrier who is Gui's mother.
- Fifivelinha (voiced by Mariana Caltabiano) - A girl with purple hair.
- Ribaldo "Riba" (voiced by Arly Cardoso) - A grey mouse.
- Professora Jararaca (voiced by Ricardo Aidar) - A green snake.
- Pitibela - A beige female Pit bull who is Piti's girlfriend.
- Pitbalinha - A little beige male Pit bull who is Piti's younger brother.
- Jaiminho - A male pig.
- Nerdson (voiced by Eduardo Jardim) - A boy who is Gui's neighbor.
- Irmãozão (voiced by Thomas Barreto) - A big and strong beige male dog. He appears in the episode "Irmãozinho".
- Justin Bibelô - A male, teenage yellow bird who is a parody of Justin Bieber.
- Lívia (voiced by Mariana Caltabiano) - A tan female dog. She appears in the episode "Queridinha".
- Birdy - A red male bird.
- Jack Pé D'Curry - A French pink male dog.
- Bisa - An old beige female dog who is Gui's great grandmother.
- Rafael Chacal (voiced by Eduardo Jardim) - A Spanish tennis player who is a parody of Rafael Nadal. He appears in the episode "Cuecas Conforto".

== Film ==
A film based on the series, Brasil Animado, was released to theaters on January 21, 2011.
