= Belowars =

2009 film directed by Paulo Munhoz

- Directed by: Paulo Munhoz
- Written by: Paulo Munhoz; Érico Beduschi
- Based on: Guerra Dentro da Gente by Paulo Leminski
- Music by: Vadeco
- Production company: Tecnokena
- Distributed by: Kinopus
- Release date: 2009
- Running time: 71 minutes
- Country: Brazil
- Language: Portuguese

Belowars is a 2009 Brazilian adult animated film directed by Paulo Munhoz based on the book Guerra Dentro da Gente, by Paulo Leminski.

== Plot ==
The film follows the story of Baita, a boy who meets an old man, Kutala, who offers to start it in the art of war. Seduced by that idea, Baita starts a journey of adventure and inner transformation.

== Cast ==
- Chico Nogueira as Kutala
- André Coelho as Baita
- Célia Ribeira as Princess
- Mauro Zanata as Seller
- Regina Vogue as Gorda
- Enéas Lour as Captain Baluta
