= The Earth Orchestra =

- Orkestra Lurtarra
- Directed by: Harkaitz Cano Jauregi; Eneko Olasagasti
- Based on: Orkestra Lurtarra, novel by Harkaitz Canos
- Release date: 8 April 2022
- Running time: 70 minutes
- Country: Spain
- Language: Basque

The Earth Orchestra – originally in Basque, Orkestra Lurtarra (Terrestrial Orchestra) – is a 2022 Basque animated film directed by Imanol Zinkunegi and Joseba Ponce. Distributed by Paycom, it premiered on April 8, 2022 and was dubbed in Catalan. The film adapts a Basque novel for young adults by Harkaitz Canos, who contributed to the screenplay.

== Plot ==
Manu, a young man, has been in love with the great pianist Stella Panini since he was a child; and his dream is to meet her. To make it come true, he forms an orchestra, following the advice of a shady character, Stefano Salegi, who becomes his manager. The orchestra that Manu forms includes various peculiar musicians and a goat.

== Accolades ==
The film received 17 nominations at the 2023 Goya Awards, the highest number for an animation film.

== Reception ==
Orkestra Lurtarra received positive reviews in El Correo and in El Diario Vasco, that gave the film 4 stars out of 5. Commenting on the film for the Basque premiere in San Sebastián, Guraso found that "this unusual orchestra (...) perfectly shows what any musical group has to experience both locally and on the road, but in a humorous tone" The film was presented as "an animation comedy and a musical road movie" and was said to differ from the book in its more contemporary approach of music.
