= The Boy and the Sword =

Independent action adventure animated film

- (formerly) Sword and Sorrow
- Directed by: Mehrdad Mehrabi Gargari; Emad Rahmani
- Written by: Emad Rahmani; Meysam Abdollahi Pour; Reza Farahani
- Starring: (voice cast) Amir Ghaffarmanesh; Mahbod Ghanaatpisheh; Mehrdad Memarzadeh; Sahar Choobdar
- Production company: Permanent Way Entertainment
- Distributed by: Octane Media
- Release dates: 1 February 2022; Released on Apple TV in 2023.
- Running time: 87 minutes
- Country: Iran
- Languages: Persian and English

The Boy and the Sword (formerly Sword and Sorrow) (فارسی: شمشیر و اندوه) is a Turkish independent animated action adventure film produced by Permanent Way Entertainment and distributed by Octane Media. It was directed by Emad Rahmani and co-directed by Mehrdad Mehrabi Gargari. The Boy and the Sword was filmed in Iran and is available in Persian and English. The voice cast includes Amir Ghaffarmanesh, Mahbod Ghanaatpisheh, Mehrdad Memarzadeh, and Sahar Choobdar. The film premiered at the 42nd Fajr International Film Festival on 1 February 2022. It was released on Apple TV in 2023.

The Boy and the Sword follows the story of Karen, a 7-year-old boy whose home was burned to ashes and his family slain by the cruel tyrant, "Sultan". But fortunately, Karen was saved by his uncle and secretly transferred to Bukhara, where he grew up with a loving family. Two decades have gone by, and now, Karen is a grown man and his heart is filled with vengeance and justice. To seek that justice, Karen joins forces with the rebel forces to fight against the tyranny of the Sultan.

The film has garnered international recognition, securing 15 awards at international film festivals, including the Best Feature Film at the SoCal Film Awards and Best Animation at the Cannes World Film Festival Monthly Awards.

== Plot ==
In the ancient city of Al-Mada'in, seven-year-old Karen is living peacefully with his family. One day, he receives a wooden sword from his father, Parviz, on his birthday, a token of courage and heritage. But one night, disaster strikes, and a brutal decree from the Sultan shatters his family, leaving him orphaned and his home burned. But when it came to killing Karen, the guard couldn't do it, so they left him to die in the fire. Fortunately for Karen, his uncle Mahan rescues him, and they find refuge in Bukhara, where the Borookhim family nurtures Karen. The wise Borookhim is a dear friend of Karen's father and a famed warrior who taught Karen the art of the sword.

Karen grew up with Andia, Borookhim's daughter, and Javid, her cousin. He fell in love with Andia and married her, little did he know that his friend, Javid, was also in love with Andia, and so the seeds of jealousy were planted in the mind of Javid. Although years have passed since the accident that burned his home and killed his family, Karen is still haunted by nightmares from that accident, which fueled his thirst for bringing down the tyrant.

Over the next two decades, Karen matures into a resolute warrior, driven to dismantle the Sultan's oppressive regime. But Bukhara is not the safe haven it once was from the injustice of the Sultan, so Karen and Andia decided to leave the city to go back to Madain to fight the Sultan directly. Joined by his wife Andia and Mahan, Karen leads a band of rebels to confront the Sultan in Al-Mada'in.

== Voice Cast ==
- Mahbod Ghanaatpisheh as Karen: The central figure, orphaned at seven, who transforms into a warrior by 28, fueled by a wooden sword symbolising his father's defiance. Married to Andia, he is a father to Keivan, balancing love with his quest for justice.
- Gholamreza Sadeghi as Mahan: Karen's uncle, a 50-year-old rebel leader with a storied past. Fierce in battle, he remains a devoted father to Bahareh and husband to Lady Delaviz.
- Mohsen Zarabadipour as Borookhim: Bukhara's chieftain, a wise merchant who shelters Karen and others. His compassion defines him as a father to Andia and an adoptive parent to Javid.
- Zohreh Shokoufandeh as Andia: Karen's childhood friend and wife, a spirited and independent woman whose courage bolsters his mission. She is a dedicated mother to Keivan.
- Saeed Moghaddam Manesh as Javid: Borookhim's nephew, whose envy of Karen festers from childhood into adulthood, shaping a complex and conflicted path.
- Meysam Niknam as The Sultan: Madain's tyrannical ruler, whose outward piety masks a ruthless ambition to crush dissent through cunning and violence.
- Amir Ghaffarmanesh as The Sultan's Son: After the death of the Sultan, his son takes the reign and continues to terrorize the people.
- Mohsen Sarshar as Ashat: The Sultan's army commander, a merciless enforcer who wields brutality with precision, indifferent to the lives he destroys.
- Additional Casts: Javaneh Borhani, Sahar Choobdar, Amirarsalan Dostfatemeh, Azam Habibi, Maryam Khelghati, Alamtaj Kheyrinia, Mehrdad Memarzadeh, Milad Mobini, Tooraj Nasr, Hesam Sadeghinikoo, Masiha Shahidiasl, Kourosh Zarepanah, and Sheida Zeyni.

== Production ==
=== Animation and Design ===
The production harnessed Unreal Engine 5, which enabled real-time rendering and good visual fidelity. Features like Nanite virtualised geometry and Lumen dynamic global illumination facilitated environments and lifelike characters. Epic Games' MetaHuman Creator aided in designing expressive characters.

== Release and Reception ==
The Boy and the Sword is officially listed with a 2023 release date on Apple TV. However, wider availability of services like Amazon Prime and international media coverage appeared in mid-2025. Thus, the film's digital and international distribution spans 2023 to 2025.

=== Reception ===
The Boy and the Sword received mixed to positive reviews from critics. The film has not been assigned an aggregate score on major review aggregator sites.

Panos Kotzathanasis of Asian Movie Pulse praised the film's expansive scope and detailed audiovisual style, while noting occasional pacing issues. Spanish outlet EscribiendoCine described the film as an animated epic rooted in ancient Persian culture, highlighting its blend of action and mythology. Just for Movie Freaks commented on the use of Unreal Engine 5 technology and the film's combination of traditional storytelling with modern animation techniques, but noted weaknesses in voice acting and audio synchronization.

Jim Schembri offered a more critical view, noting the film's bold stylistic choices but expressing reservations about its narrative execution and thematic cohesion. He also mentioned the film's recognition at international film festivals.

The film received over 15 awards, including Best Animation at the Cannes World Film Festival and Best Animated Feature at the Five Continents International Film Festival.

Turkish outlet Gamizm covered the film's international distribution. The Tehran Times reported on its availability on streaming platforms and they mentioned that the movie was formerly known as "The Sword and Sorrow". English-language site BubbleBlabber noted the film's darker tone and mature themes compared to mainstream animated features, although the review is under the former name, "Sword and Sorrow".

== Awards ==
The Boy and the Sword was formerly known as Sword and Sorrow, and the awards are under the name above.

Award	Category	Recipient	Result
Cannes World Film Festival 2023	Best Animation (Monthly Award)	Emad Rahmani and Mehrdad Mehrabi Gargari	Won
SoCal Film Awards 2023	Best Feature Film	Emad Rahmani and Mehrdad Mehrabi Gargari	Won
Rome International Movie Awards July/ June Award 2023	Best Action	Emad Rahmani and Mehrdad Mehrabi Gargari	Won
Rome International Movie Awards July/ June Award 2023	Best Producer	Moein Karimi Ghahroudi and Mehdi Jafari	Won
Rome International Movie Awards July/ June Award 2023	Best Sound Design	Milad Estakhri	Won
Crown Wood International Film Festival 2023	Best Family and Children Film	Emad Rahmani and Mehrdad Mehrabi Gargari	Won
Crown Wood International Film Festival 2023	Animated Feature Film	Emad Rahmani and Mehrdad Mehrabi Gargari	Won
Five Continents International Film Festival 2023	Best Animated Feature Film	Emad Rahmani and Mehrdad Mehrabi Gargari	Won
Five Continents International Film Festival 2023	Best Young Director Feature Film	Milad Aligholia	Won
Oniros Film Awards 2023	Best Animation	Emad Rahmani and Mehrdad Mehrabi Gargari	Won
South Film and Arts Academy Festival 2023	Best Animation Feature (Ref)	Emad Rahmani and Mehrdad Mehrabi Gargari	Won
South Film and Arts Academy Festival 2023	Sound Design Honorable Mention In A Feature Film	Shahin Pejhan, Arash Babayi, and Milad Estakhri	Honorable Mention
Sacramento Underground Film and Arts Festival 2023	Animation - Feature	Emad Rahmani and Mehrdad Mehrabi Gargari	Won
Bright International Film Festival 2023	Best Animated Film	Emad Rahmani and Mehrdad Mehrabi Gargari	Won
Septimius Awards 2024	Best Animation	Emad Rahmani and Mehrdad Mehrabi Gargari	Nominated
