= Brasil Animado =

2011 film directed by Mariana Caltabiano

- Directed by: Mariana Caltabiano
- Written by: Mariana Caltabiano; Eduardo Jardim
- Produced by: Mariana Caltabano
- Starring: Eduardo Jardim; Fernando Meirelles; Daiane dos Santos; Mariana Caltabiano; Ariel Wollinger
- Edited by: Ihon Yadoya
- Music by: Alexandre Guerra
- Production companies: Mariana Caltabiano Criações; TeleImage; Globo Filmes; 3D Casablanca
- Distributed by: Imagem Filmes
- Release date: January 21, 2011
- Running time: 75 minutes
- Country: Brazil
- Language: Portuguese
- Budget: R$3 million ($1,355,931)
- Box office: R$1,014,270 ($458,427)

Brasil Animado is a 2011 Brazilian animated comedy film directed by Mariana Caltabiano. The film is based on As Aventuras de Gui & Estopa, an animated series created by Caltabiano.

The movie combines the use of live-action and traditional animation, a technique used in films like Who Framed Roger Rabbit and Space Jam. This is the first Brazilian movie completely produced with 3D technology.

== Plot ==
A couple of dogs called Stress and Relax leave in search for the Cariniana legalis, the oldest tree of Brazil. They are not sure what city the tree is in. While Relax thinks only about having fun and getting to know the culture of different parts of Brazil, Stress becomes increasingly eager to find the tree, as he hopes to get rich selling souvenirs of it.

== Cast ==
- Eduardo Jardim
- Fernando Meirelles
- Daiane dos Santos
- Ariel Wollinger
- Mariana Caltabiano

== Production ==
Filming took place between October 31, 2009 and December 3, 2010. Part of the animation was produced by Mariana Caltabiano Criações and TeleImage, while the live-action was recorded in the studios of Globo Filmes. The footage was shot in Rio de Janeiro, Salvador, São Paulo, Foz do Iguaçu, Ouro Preto, Gramado, Brasília, Florianópolis and other cities.
