= Yuku and the Flower of the Himalayas =

2022 Belgian, French and Swiss film

- Belgian theatrical release poster
- Directed by: Arnaud Demuynck; Rémi Durin
- Written by: Arnaud Demuynck
- Produced by: Nicolas Burlet; Mathieu Courtois; Arnaud Demuynck; Jean-François Le Corre; Patrick Quinet
- Starring: Lily Demuynck Deydier; Agnès Jaoui; Arno; Tom Novembre; Igor Van Dessel; Carine Seront; Thierry De Coster; Maia Baran; Martin Spinhayer
- Music by: Alexandre Brouillard; David Rémy; Yan Volsy
- Production companies: Vivement Lundi! Les Films du Nord; Artémis Productions; La Boîte... Productions; Nadasdy Film
- Distributed by: Le Parc Distribution (Belgium); Gebeka Films (France); Outside the Box (Switzerland)
- Release dates: 16 June 2022 (Annecy); 19 October 2022 (France & Belgium); 30 November 2022 (Switzerland)
- Running time: 65 minutes
- Countries: Belgium; France; Switzerland
- Language: French
- Box office: $460,311

Yuku and the Flower of the Himalayas (French: Yuku et la fleur de l'Himalaya) is a 2022 animated adventure film directed by Arnaud Demuynck and Rémi Durin, in their feature directorial debut. It is a Belgian, French, and Swiss co-production, and follows Yuku, a mouse, who embarks on a quest to find the Himalayan flower.

The film premiered at the Annecy International Animation Film Festival on 16 June 2022, and was released in France and Belgium on 19 October 2022.

== Cast ==
- Lily Demuynck Deydier as Yuku, a musical mouse
- Agnès Jaoui as La Renarde
- Arno as Rat
- Tom Novembre as Le Loup
- Igor Van Dessel as L'Ecureuil
- Carine Seront as Mamy
- Thierry De Coster as Cat
- Maia Baran as Maman Souris
- Martin Spinhayer as Le Corbeau

== Release ==
Yuku and the Flower of the Himalayas premiered at the Annecy International Animation Film Festival on 16 June 2022. The film was released in France & Belgium on 19 October 2022 by Gebeka Films and Le Parc Distribution, and in Switzerland on 30 November by Outside the Box.

== Reception ==
Ezequiel Boetti of Otros Cines stated in her review "Its innocence and simplicity are perfectly in tune with the spirit of a film with sober and effective strokes at the service of cheerful and colorful drawings.
