= My Big Big Friend – The Movie =

2022 Brazilian film

My Big Big Friend - The Movie
- Theatrical release poster
- Directed by: Andrés Lieban
- Screenplay by: Claudia Koogan Breitman; Clive Endersby
- Based on: My Big Big Friend by Andrés Lieban & Claudia Koogan Breitman
- Produced by: Vivian Amadio; Amanda Bortolo; André Breitman; Carlos Emmanuel Souto de Alencar; Francine Rodrigues; Ricardo Sardinha; Laura Senna; Ramon Vasconcellos
- Edited by: Anna Clara Miranda
- Music by: Clive Endersby; Christiaan Oyens; Dan Torres
- Production company: 2DLab
- Distributed by: O2 Play
- Release date: 12 May 2022 (Brazil)
- Running time: 77 minutes
- Country: Brazil
- Language: Portuguese

My Big Big Friend – The Movie (Portuguese: Meu AmigãoZão - O Filme) is a 2022 Brazilian animated adventure fantasy film directed by Andrés Lieban and written by Claudia Koogan Breitman & Clive Endersby. The music for the film was composed by Christiaan Oyens who recorded the score with The City of Prague Philharmonic Orchestra. It is based on the animated series My Big Big Friend by Andrés Lieban and Claudia Koogan Breitman. It premiered on May 12, 2022, in Brazilian theaters. An English version has yet to be released.

== Synopsis ==
Yuri, Lili and Matt prepare for a special day. But their dreams go down the drain when they discover that the parents have changed their plans and are now going to the same summer camp together, with several unknown children. That's where they decide to escape to a fantastic place where Doodle Doubt lives, a creature who wants to have all the Buddies to himself and ends up distracting the children and taking Goliath, Nessa and Bongo to a distant island where he hides many other Buddies. Yuri, Lili and Matt must join forces and embark on a journey full of adventure and mystery to save them.

== Cast ==
The actors participating in this film are:

- Fernanda Ribeiro as Yuri
- Alice Lieban as Lili
- Pablo Barros as Matt
- Marcio Simões as Goliat
- Lina Mendes as Nessa
- Sérgio Stern as Bongo
- Bia Barros as Bobbie The Panda
- Bruno Bonatto as Showgirl
- Josy Bonfim as Showgirl
- Guilherme Briggs as Duvi Dudum
- Anna Rita Cerqueira as Diamond Princess
- Eduardo Drummond as Patrick The Hippopotamus / Paintbrush / Pedra
- Isadora Infante as Ruby Princess

== Accolades ==
Year	Award / Festival	Category	Recipient	Result	Ref.
2022	Chicago International Children's Film Festival	Best Animated Feature Film - Second Prize	My Big Big Friend - The Movie	Won	
2023	Grande Prêmio do Cinema Brasileiro	Best Animated Feature Film	André Breitman & Andrés Lieban	Nominated	
2024	Children Cinema Awards	Best Original Score	Christiaan Oyens	Won	
2024	Children Cinema Awards	Best Producer	André Breitman	Won	
2025	Children Cinema Awards	Best Musical Movie	Claudia Koogan Breitman	Won	
