= Alê Abreu =

Brazilian film director and screenwriter (born 1971)

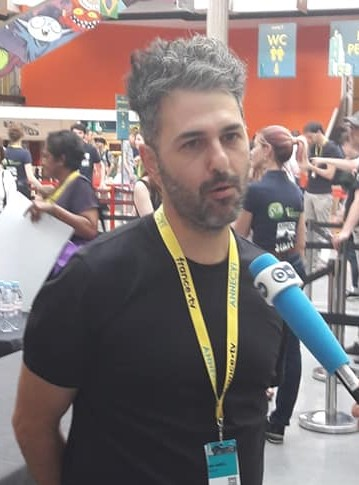
- Abreu at the Annecy International Animation Festival 2018.
- Born: March 6, 1971 (age 55); São Paulo, Brazil
- Occupations: Screenwriter, director
- Years active: 1993–present

Alê Abreu (born March 6, 1971) is a Brazilian film director, screenwriter, character animator, film editor and producer. Sírius, his first short film, debuted at the 1993 Anima Mundi as the only Brazilian animation that year. It won the Best Film Award at the Festival de Cine para Niños y Jovenes and was also screened at the Mostra Internacional de Cinema São Paulo and at the section Animation for Children of the Hiroshima International Animation Festival. His second short film, Espantalho (lit. "Scarecrow"), released in 1998, won the 3rd Best Brazilian Animation at the Anima Mundi, the Best Art Direction Award at the Brazilian Film Festival of Miami, and was nominated for Best Animated Feature at the 1st Grande Prêmio Cinema Brasil. His first feature film, Garoto Cósmico, debuted at the 2007 Anima Mundi. In 2013, at the Ottawa International Animation Festival, he released his second film, Boy and the World. This film became an international success, was nominated at the 88th Academy Awards for Best Animated Feature, and won several prizes, including the Best Feature Film at the Annecy International Animated Film Festival and the Best Animated Feature-Independent at the Annie Awards.
