= My Big Big Friend =

Animated children's television series

- Also known as: Meu Amigãozão (Brazil); Amigazazo/Mi Amigazazo (Latin America); Mon Grand Grand Ami (France)
- Genre: Preschool; Children's television series Adventure; Comedy; Fantasy; Musical
- Created by: Andrés Lieban; Claudia Koogan Breitman
- Developed by: Mary Mackay-Smith
- Story by: Mary Mackay-Smith
- Directed by: Andrés Lieban
- Theme music composer: Meiro Stamm
- Composer: GeoHarmonic Music Corporation
- Countries of origin: Brazil; Canada
- Original languages: Portuguese; English
- No. of seasons: 2
- No. of episodes: 52 (103 segments)

Production
- Executive producers: André Breitman; Ira Levy; Peter Williamson
- Producers: André Breitman; Stephanie Betts (S1); Meghan Read (S2)
- Running time: 25 minutes (regular); 12 minutes (segments)
- Production companies: 2DLab; Breakthrough Animation

Original release
- Network: TV Brasil (Brazil); Treehouse TV (Canada); Discovery Kids Latin America (Latin America)
- Release: September 1, 2008 – June 28, 2015

My Big Big Friend (Portuguese: Meu Amigãozão) is a Brazilian-Canadian animated musical preschool children's television series targeted at ages 2 to 11 created by Andrés Lieban and Claudia Koogan Breitman, co-produced by Brazilian studio 2DLab and the Canadian company Breakthrough Animation. it was part of the Discovery Kids and TV Brasil programming block, airing from September 1, 2008 to June 28, 2015.

It also premiered in Canada on Treehouse TV on September 9, 2009. It was financed with the laws of federal tax incentives, the Procult (BNDES) and the Audiovisual Sector Fund – FSA. In Latin America, it is known as Amigazazo or Mi Amigazazo. In France, it is known as Mon Grand Grand Ami.

My Big Big Friend has been sold to over 100 territories and was distributed by 9 Story Media Group. It received positive reviews and various awards, and even DVD releases, toys, and a live show in 2014 called Meu AmigãoZão O Musical.

The show was animated using Toon Boom Harmony. A feature-length film based on the series titled Meu AmigãoZão - O Filme was released on May 12, 2022, in Brazilian theaters, while an English version has yet to be released.

== Premise ==
the show centers around a boy named Yuri and his best friend Golias the Elephant. Yuri and Golias are also friends with Lili, Nessa the Giraffe, Matt and Bongo the Kangaroo. Golias, Nessa and Bongo are three imaginary friends who are visible to all three kids but invisible to adults and other children. Together, Yuri, Golias and their friends have to face everyday challenges like sharing, honesty, facing their fears, trying new things, etc.

== Characters ==
=== Main ===
- Yuri, the Protagonist is a 4 to 5-year-old boy, very smart, independent and happy, and has a very fertile imagination. He is an only child, and as a result is sometimes lonely, and can be a little selfish, yet shy at times.

==== Friends ====
- Lili is a 6-year-old girl, very determined and loyal, and often speaks before she thinks. She often tries to help take care of her three baby brothers; this has given her a tendency towards bossiness, which her friends do not always like, especially when she attempts to assign control of their games.
- Matt is a 7-year-old boy who loves to play sports, and is very energetic in everything he does. He is the oldest of the three children and is very curious, full of ideas and opinions, and very mischievous, which means he is often getting into trouble. He has an older sister named Nina who often teases and bullies him.

=== Big Big Friends ===
- Golias (Known as Goliat in Spanish), the Deuteragonist is Yuri's Big Big Friend, a large, round, blue elephant. He is affectionate, likes to act, dress up, try new things and play outdoors. He is also very timid, and gnashes his teeth in fear if the lights are out. He loves to give Yuri trunk rides, and is quite sad if he ever feels left out.
- Nessa is Lili's Big Big Friend, a pink giraffe. She can make friends with anyone, and is optimistic and cheerful. She also lets Lili ride on her neck. She is agreeable and mediates conflicts.
- Bongo is Matt's Big Big Friend, a green kangaroo. Like Matt, he is athletic, energetic and constantly jumping. He has a great sense of humor and an infectious, uncontrollable laugh. Bongo is afraid of being ignored and likes attention. Bongo is also very fearful. He has a pouch that Matt rides in despite the fact he is a male kangaroo (in real life, only female kangaroos have pouches). His pouch is apparently in more than one spot, since Bongo can be seen pulling things out or putting things into different pouches in various locations, such as, up by his neck, down at his sides (almost like pockets).

== Cast ==
=== Canada ===
- Yuri – Nissae Isen
- Matt – Gage Munroe
- Lili – Addison Holley
- Golias (Goliat) – Scott McCord
- Bongo – Rick Miller
- Nessa – Tajja Isen
- Lobster (Beach Blast!) - Stacey DePass
- Rose (Flower Power!) - Catherine Disher
- Daisy (Flower Power!) - Stephanie Anne Mills
- Pansy (Flower Power!) - Hannah Endicott-Douglas
- Yuri's Dad - Neil Crone
- Yuri's Mom / Bushy the Dog - Susan Roman
- Lili's Mom - Linda Ballantyne
- Lili's Dad - Martin Roach
- Matt's Mom / Otto the Penguin - Julie Lemieux
- Matt's Dad - Richard Waugh
- Oyster (Beach Blast!) / S Magnet ("Everyone's a Critic") - Seán Cullen
- Ms. Carrol - Julie Pinto
- Ms. Martin - Athena Karkanis
- Grandmother - Corinne Conley
- Mother Hen - Ellen-Ray Hennessey
- Lisa - Alyson Court
- Soccer Ball - Bruce Dow

=== Brazil ===
- Yuri – Fernanda Ribeiro
- Matt – Eduardo Drummond (Season 1) and João Victor Granja (Season 2)
- Lili – Anna Rita Cerqueira
- Golias (Goliat) – Márcio Simões
- Bongo – Sérgio Stern
- Nessa – Lina Mendes (Season 1) and Christiane Monteiro (Season 2)

== Development and Production ==
in 2004, a web short titled AmigãoZão was released. It was about Yuri and Golias in their daily life, gaining a notable Popularity for its visual style, music and the feels. Canadian companies soon wanted to bring it to Television. In 2006, as it was planned as a 25-minute series of 26 episodes over 52 12-minute segments. the short was then reworked into a Pilot, with notable changes, such as Golias now more polished, and Nessa now pink instead of yellow to look more imaginary.

In September 2013, the show was greenlit for a 2nd season of another 26 episodes and was worked until December from that same year.

52 episodes were produced over 103 segments. 2DLab announced that My Big Big Friend was supposingly stated to have a third season, but as of November 2026, nothing is confirmed.

== Episodes ==
=== Series overview ===
Season	Episodes	Originally released	
Season	Episodes	First released	Last released
1	26	September 1, 2008 (Brazil); September 9, 2009 (Canada)	February 23, 2010 (Brazil); February 21, 2011 (Canada)
2	26	September 6, 2014 (Brazil); March 20, 2014 (Canada)	June 28, 2015 (Brazil); December 15, 2014 (Canada)

=== Season 1 (2008–10) ===
- Season 1 premiered in Canada on September 9, 2009, and in Brazil on September 1, 2008, and ended in Canada on February 21, 2011, and in Brazil on February 23, 2010.

No.	Title	Written by	Storyboard by	Original release date	Canadian air date (Treehouse TV)	Prod. code	Canadian viewers (millions)
1	"Brickle Pickle" "All the Way Up"	Mary Mackay-Smith Story by : Mary Mackay-Smith; Teleplay by : Craig Martin	Rafael Schmidt Andrés Lieban	September 1, 2008	September 9, 2009	101	N/A
After keeping a treat from his mother all to himself, Yuri goes on a pirate adventure and learns that it is more fun to share things with his friends. Lili's friends help her overcome her fear of heights during a mountain climb to a castle in the sky.
2	"Hippo-licious" "Clowning Around"	Craig Martin Story by : Mary Mackay-Smith; Teleplay by : Craig Martin	William Lages Diego Stoliar	September 10, 2008	September 16, 2009	102	N/A
Matt is dead set against trying spinach, but he's left with no choice when he gets caught in a rapidly growing spinach jungle. Lili learns what forgiveness is all about after her friends put on a circus to make amends for accidentally ruining her face crayons.
3	"Air Buddies" "The Sneakers"	James Backshall Meghan Read	Marcio de Castro Raphael Bezerra	September 19, 2008	September 23, 2009	103	N/A
Yuri wants to fly his new kite all by himself, but quickly realizes that sometimes you need the help of a few good friends - especially when you're trying to land a plane. After accidentally chipping a vase, Lili and Nessa have to sneak through their household museum to put it back before her parents find out, but quickly realize that honesty is always the best policy.
4	"Skipping Stones" "No Kid is an Island"	Craig Martin Jeff Sweeney	LightStar Studio William Lages	September 28, 2008	September 30, 2009	104	N/A
Watching his friends have a blast while losing at silly funhouse games, Matt realizes that you do not always have to be the best at something in order to have fun doing it. Upset at the news of moving away, Lili strands herself on a desert island, where a whale teaches her how to make new friends and a vigorous rescue mission teaches her that her old friends will always be there for her.
5	"Show-and-Tell" "Perfect Princess"	Hugh Duffy Craig Martin	Marcio de Castro Raphael Bezerra	October 7, 2008	October 7, 2009	105	N/A
Nervous to talk about his artwork in class, Yuri leaps right into his own painting to hide, and winds up working through his fears as he guides his friends through the world he created. Lili gains a new appreciation for her glasses after she takes them off at her costume party and causes near disaster during her search for a prince.
6	"Count Glerm" "Hair-Brained Idea"	Steve Westren Meghan Read	Diego Stoliar William Lages	October 26, 2008	October 14, 2009	106	N/A
Yuri is hesitant to learn French, but decides to give it a chance after a fantastical game of hide-and-seek in a place where you can only speak "glerm". Nervous that a barber won't be able to cut his hair the way he likes it, Matt and Bongo decide to never get their hair cut again and instead become hairy cavemen.
7	"Over the Rainbow" "Lili's Tea Party"	Deborah Jarvis Craig Martin	Diego Stoliar LightStar Studio	November 5, 2008	October 21, 2009	107	N/A
Worried that he's in big trouble, Matt tries to hide a note from his teacher at the end of a rainbow, but his conscience catches up with him and Matt decides to come clean and face the music. Lili ditches her tea-party-ruining brothers in favor of a grown-up party in her doll house, but as it turns out, a stuffy tea-party is no party at all.
8	"Tell Me a Story" "Food's Up!"	Deborah Jarvis Jeff Sweeney	Marcio de Castro Raphael Bezerra	November 14, 2008	October 28, 2009	108	N/A
Yuri has trouble with a game that involves improvising a story, but he comes up with a terrific ending after he goes right inside of it, to the Kingdom of Yum. Upset that her brothers take up all her mother's time, Lili decides to prove how easy it is to look after people by running her own ice cream shoppe, but winds up gaining a new appreciation for the demands of motherhood instead.
9	"A Chance of Tomatoes" "Time Out!"	James Backshall Ben Joseph	William Lages Robin Budd	November 23, 2008	November 5, 2009	109	N/A
Matt's given what he thinks is a small role in the classroom duties, but finds a way to make it a big one after the kids experience some strange weather during a camping trip. After alienating her friends with too many rules, Lili invents an impossible game of desert croquet, which even she can't play.
10	"Missing Miss Puffy" "Descent to the Downstairs"	James Backshall Craig Martin	Diego Stoliar Marcio de Castro	December 2, 2008	November 12, 2009	110	N/A
Lili takes her friends on a skyward adventure to reclaim her lost poodle balloon, but along the way she learns that sometimes, even when you love something, you have to let it go. Yuri must summon all of his courage (and his friends) to venture into his basement, eventually learning that there is literally nothing to be afraid of.
11	"Faeries of the Forest" "Diggin' a Hole"	Christin Simms Meghan Read	Phil LaFrance Raphael Bezerra	December 11, 2008	November 19, 2009	111	N/A
Lili shies away from playing so she won't get her new dress dirty, but after spending a day as a forest fairy, she realizes there is nothing wrong with a little dirt. Yuri digs himself a hole, literally, after he falls off a two-wheel bike on his first try and refuses to get back on, forcing him to try again until he climbs his way to freedom.
12	"Fort Messy" "Beach Blast"	Jenn Engels Claudia Koogan Breitman	James Edward LeClaire Kico	December 20, 2008	November 26, 2009	112	N/A
After a harrowing adventure through Matt's messy bedroom to find his swim trunks, Matt begins to realize the benefits of tidying up. Yuri overcomes his dislike of slimy sea creatures after a turtle and a lobster help to free Golias from a ship wreck on the ocean floor.
13	"Finders Keepers" "Everyone's a Critic"	Deborah Jarvis Steve Westren	William Lages Diego Stoliar	December 29, 2008	December 3, 2009	113	N/A
Lili finds a pretty ring in the sandbox and declares 'finders keepers', but after a trip to a magic palace, Lili finds out what it is like to lose something precious and decides to return the ring to its rightful owner. After Yuri gives Matt's painting some harsh criticism, he is subjected to a taste of his own medicine by a snarky fridge magnet with peculiar taste.
14	"Music Man" "Dream On"	Heather Jackson Deborah Jarvis	Marcio de Castro William Lages	October 19, 2009	November 27, 2010	115	N/A
Matt learns how to play with others instead of over top of others during a larger-than-life music lesson at school. Yuri is scared to have a nap after he has an awful dream about losing Golias, so his friends decide to return to the dream with him so they can all help Yuri find his big, big friend.
15	"King of the Monkeys" "That's My Spot!"	Todd Brian James Backshall	Kico Raphael Bezerra	October 28, 2009	December 4, 2010	114	N/A
Yuri has trouble empathizing with Matt, who has his leg in a cast and his mood in a funk, but a game of monkeys teaches him what it means to be a supportive friend. Lili has a hard time giving up her usual spot on the carpet and decides to create her own special spot in a beautiful aquarium that only she may sit in; but as it turns out, having only one spot isn't nearly as much fun as trying out new ones.
16	"It's My Party!" "Doggy Duty"	Meghan Read Morgan Barnes	Diego Stoliar Kico	November 7, 2009	December 11, 2010	116	N/A
Yuri's upset when he doesn't get the birthday gift that he really wanted, but after working hard to prepare a jungle feast for King Golias, he realizes that a gift made with love is the best kind there is. Matt adopts an imaginary puppy in attempt to prove that he can handle owning a dog, but after a long day of puppy mischief, Matt realizes that his parents may be right - he's not ready for a puppy yet.
17	"Derailed" "Somethin' Special"	Jenn Engels Meghan Read	Marcio de Castro William Lages	November 16, 2009	December 18, 2010	117	N/A
Lili finds out just how much she loves spending time with her brothers after she's forced to care for them during a train ride with her friends. Yuri worries that he is no longer special when his grandmother pays attention to Matt and Lili during a visit, but with the help of a trunk-full of elephant puppets, Golias shows him that he could not be more wrong.
18	"The Sleepover" "I Didn't Think of That"	Craig Martin Meghan Read	Raphael Bezerra Diego Stoliar	November 25, 2009	December 25, 2010	118	N/A
Yuri prepares for his first ever sleepover by practicing inside a snowy cabin, and has to learn how to adapt his usual routine. Matt's tendency to act before he thinks gets him into a whole lot of trouble when he winds up trapped inside a giant gingerbread house.
19	"The New Farmer" "Perfect Picnic"	Meghan Read Craig Martin	Kico Raphael Bezerra	December 4, 2009	January 2, 2011	119	N/A
Yuri learns the importance of giving someone new a chance, after he tries to fill-in for a sick farmer on a farm full of very stubborn animals. Unhappy with their usual picnic, Lili decides to take the boys on a "perfect" picnic, except that it is missing one key element: fun.
20	"Lili Bee" "Flower Power"	Craig Martin Todd Brian	William Lages Marcio de Castro	December 13, 2009	January 9, 2011	120	N/A
After leading her friends on a blind (and ultimately futile) quest for a bee hive, Lili finally learns to admit when she does not know something. Matt finds out what it is like to walk in someone else's shoes, when his own shoes get rooted to the ground and he spends the day with a couple of lovely flowers.
21	"No, My Game!" "Manly Matt"	Craig Martin	Diego Stoliar Kico	December 22, 2009	January 16, 2011	121	N/A
Unable to agree on what game to play, the kids decide to split up and play by themselves, but soon realize that with just a little compromise they can all play together and have much more fun. Matt decides that he wants to rush life and live a life with no-rules, just like action-hero Jungle Jake, but a few mishaps in the jungle show him that some rules exist for a reason.
22	"Stickers" "Matt's Fun Park"	Mary Mackay-Smith James Backshall	William Lages Diego Stoliar and Marcio de Castro	December 31, 2009	January 23, 2011	122	N/A
Lili gets upset with Matt when he loses her sticker, but later apologizes after venturing into a giant sticker garden, where she accidentally loses a few precious things of Nessa's. When their school hiking trip is canceled, Matt learns that fun can be had just about anywhere - even at the doors of a closed amusement park.
23	"Big and Small" "Valentine's Day"	Craig Martin	Raphael Bezerra Kico	January 10, 2010	January 30, 2011	123	N/A
Tired of being small, Yuri visits the Land of Giants, where he's sure to find a giant that can make him big in a hurry; but along the way Yuri realizes that being small has its advantages, too. Worried that his Valentine's Day cards aren't good enough, Matt decides to buy gifts for his family in a giant toy store instead; but a card from his best friend shows Matt that a gift made with love is the best kind there is.
24	"The Boat Ride" "Hot and Cold"	Dennise Fordham Claudia Koogan Breitman	William Lages Marcio de Castro	February 5, 2010	February 7, 2011	124	N/A
Matt decides that he'd rather go on a boat ride than go to his grandmother's house, but a friendly boat captain makes him realize how much he really loves spending time with his family. Yuri's Mom invites Lili and Matt for lunch and gives them the task of choosing the dessert, but when the two cannot agree on what to have, it is up to Yuri to come up with a delicious compromise.
25	"Super Lili" "Holding It In"	Meghan Read Clive Endersby and Kate Minsky	Diego Stoliar Kico	February 14, 2010	February 14, 2011	125	N/A
Lili invents a game in which she always gets picked, but after seeing her friends' disappointment at not getting a turn, she realizes that even super heroes need to share the spotlight. While doing his best not to cry after a fall, Yuri becomes a tear-filled giant and stops the flow of water in the waterpark, forcing his friends to quickly teach Yuri that it is okay to cry.
26	"You Can't Make Me!" "The Toy Drive"	Clive Endersby and Kate Minsky Meghan Read	Raphael Bezerra Diego Stoliar and William Lages	February 23, 2010	February 21, 2011	126	N/A
In a battle of wills between Matt, who wants to play soccer, and Lili, who wants to practice their song, it will take a singing soccer ball to show them how valuable (and fun) it is to compromise. After donating his rubber ducky to a toy drive, Yuri is instantly filled with regret and recruits his friends to help him win it back in a carnival game; only once Yuri is reunited with his toy, he decides to return it to the booth so someone else can have fun with it.

=== Season 2 (2014–15) ===
- Season 2 premiered in Canada on March 20, 2014, and in Brazil on September 6, 2014, and ended in Canada on December 15, 2014, and in Brazil on June 28, 2015.

No.	Title	Written by	Storyboard by	Original release date	Canadian air date (Treehouse TV)	Prod. code	Canadian viewers (millions)
1	"Harold the Hamster" "The Caterpillar Dance"	Meghan Read Clive Endersby	Rosaria Dimitri Kostic	September 6, 2014	March 20, 2014	201	N/A
After caring for the class pet over the holidays, Yuri decides to keep him forever.
2	"Toybreaker" "Stuck!"	Craig Martin Clive Endersby	Dimitri Kostic John Flagg	September 15, 2014	March 27, 2014	202	N/A
Lili is quick to accuse Matt and Yuri of a misdeed. Matt and Bongo are upset to be cooped up inside. Interstitial: Ice Cream (11 December 2014)
3	"Ready, Set... NO!" "Orange and Purple"	Meghan Read Craig Martin	Neil Burns and Rafael Schmidt Rosaria	September 24, 2014	April 4, 2014	203	N/A
Yuri and Golias realize that fears are nothing to be ashamed of. The kids get caught up in colors.
4	"Hooray for You!" "No Way, Karate!"	Andrew Sabiston Meghan Read	Dimtiri Kostic Paul Riley	October 3, 2014	April 11, 2014	204	N/A
The kids learn about accolades. Lili learns that it is good to try new and different activities.
5	"Teacher Trouble" "A Knightly Thing to Do"	Betty Quan Amy Benham	Sasha McIntyre John Flagg	October 12, 2014	April 18, 2014	205	N/A
Lili gets bent out of shape when a substitute teacher doesn't do things exactly like Ms. Carol. Matt bemoans over having to do chores before being allowed to go to a party. Interstitial: Finding You (18 December 2014)
6	"One and Only" "Sand and Flowers"	James Backshall Jeff Sweeney	Belli Studio Mario Mattoso	October 31, 2014	April 25, 2014	206	N/A
Yuri is saddened to realize he's the only one in his class without siblings.
7	"Love Potion" "The Pink Princess Nightgown"	Meghan Read Amy Cole	Dimitri Kostic Sasha McIntyre	November 10, 2014	May 2, 2014	207	N/A
Matt worries his parents stopped loving his sister. Lili won't try on a new nightgown.
8	"Let's Play Forever!" "Can't Wait"	James Backshall Amy Benham	John Flagg Demian	November 19, 2014	May 9, 2014	208	N/A
The gang declares they want to play forever. Matt and Bongo are tired of being told to wait. Interstitial: Princess (12 December 2014)
9	"Toughen Up, Nessa!" "More Like Matt"	Craig Martin Jeff Sweeney	William Lages Marcio de Castro	November 28, 2014	May 16, 2014	209	N/A
Matt and Yuri get upset when Lili swipes their crayons. Matt's sister is sad over some bad news.
10	"The Amazing Matt" "Don't Give Up!"	Andrew Sabiston Amy Benham	Rafael Schmidt Dimitri Kostic	January 12, 2015	May 23, 2014	210	N/A
Matt wishes he had superpowers to fix his sister's problem. Lili is frustrated with ballet moves.
11	"Into the Dragon's Den" "What About Me?"	James Backshall Dennise Fordham	Demian William Lages	April 6, 2015	May 30, 2014	211	N/A
Yuri decides he'd rather not visit the dentist.
12	"What's the Big Idea?" "Ice Cream and Bananas"	Betty Quan	Belli Studio Marcio de Castro	April 8, 2015	June 7, 2014	212	N/A
Lili recruits the boys to take part in a puppet show, but gets annoyed.
13	"Musical Chairs" "Who Did It?"	James Backshall Allen Markuze	Rosaria Perin	April 17, 2015	June 14, 2014	213	N/A
Matt gets out in a game of musical chairs and doesn't stay to watch the others play.
14	"Helpless" "Taste Test"	Betty Quan Amy Cole	Rafael Schmidt Demian	April 28, 2015	September 21, 2014	214A	N/A
Matt does not get why Lili and Yuri do not appreciate his help when he takes their shots at golf.
15	"Getting Better" Seriously Silly"	Pay Chen Amanda Smith	Marcio de Castro	November 7, 2014	September 28, 2014	215	N/A
Lili thinks she's the best leader, but Matt and Yuri prove they're pretty good, too; Matt's wish to stop growing makes him really small.
16	"Leader Lili" "The Incredible Shrinking Matt"	Andrew Sabiston Jeff Sweeney	Perin Rosaria	November 16, 2014	October 5, 2014	216	N/A
17	"Cowboy Fair" "Way Down the Hall"	Andrew Sabiston	Demian Mario Mattoso	November 25, 2014	October 12, 2014	217	N/A
Yuri becomes very worried about his mother when she gets a nasty cold. Yuri must learn that there is no way out without going down the scary hall.
18	"The Best Butterfly" "The Missing Snack"	Amy Cole James Backshall	Rosaria Perin	December 4, 2014	October 19, 2014	218	N/A
19	"I Can Do That!" "Where Are You?"	Meghan Read Amanda Smith	Marcio de Castro Demian	February 4, 2015	October 26, 2014	219	N/A
20	"The Penguin Dance" "Best Friends Forever"	Jeff Sweeney Dennise Fordham	Rafael Schmidt Marcio de Castro	February 13, 2015	November 3, 2014	220	N/A
21	"Wanting Better" "Play or Stay"	Jeff Sweeney Meghan Read	Perin Demian	February 22, 2015	November 10, 2014	221	N/A
Interstitial: Golf Partners (30 May 2015)
22	"Starfish and Pencil" "I Can't Pick"	Meghan Read Dennise Fordham	Belli Studio Demian	March 31, 2015	November 17, 2014	222	N/A
23	"A Guess Is a Guess" "Start Again"	Steve Westren Amy Benham	Mario Mattoso Marcio de Castro	June 10, 2015	November 24, 2014	223	N/A
24	"The Snowman" "The Tree"	Amanda Smith Pay Chen	Rafael Schmidt Demian	June 19, 2015	December 1, 2014	224	N/A
Interstitial: That Way (27 December 2016)
25	"Loud, Scary Sounds" "A Special Bubble"	Meghan Read Andrew Sabiston	Demian Rafael Schmidt	June 28, 2015	December 8, 2014	225	N/A
Matt gets a special bubble wand from his aunt and worries that if his friends play with it too, it won't be special anymore.
26	"Santa Lost His Sleigh"	Clive Endersby	TBA	December 25, 2014	December 15, 2014	226	N/A
Santa has lost his sleigh. The heroes team up to help find Santa's missing sleigh and save Christmas. Note: this episode was marked as the show's finale.

== Reception and legacy ==
==== Critical response ====
Polly Conway from Common Sense Media rated the show a three out of five stars, stating that "This sweet series can help kids get their imaginations going; it is fun to watch the characters and their imaginary friends make discoveries. Younger kids will like the animal characters and the pastel world being explored, while older preschoolers will take the subtle lessons to heart -- for example, the difference between having fun with your imagination and telling little white lies to others, as when Lili brings a flower to school and exaggerates quite a bit about how she grew it and its origins.". She also stated that "My Big Big Friend occasionally has the potential to be shrill, such as when the kids are arguing or whining, but generally it pulls back into its usual pleasant pacing and storylines".

My Big Big Friend currently holds up a 7.3 on IMDb.

The show was proved to be popular among Autistic children.

However, while it was popular with its intended audience, the show was faced with negative backlash as the GoAnimate community has shown to try to damage it's reputation just like with Dora the Explorer, Barney & Friends and Little Bill, making Grounded videos and Diatribe it. some parents even started to question the plot and Lili's behavior.

==== Controversy ====
In 2014, the protagonist Yuri has gained some controversy, being compared to the Bolivian ex-President Evo Morales.

=== Impact on internet culture ===
In 2021, the character Matt has become viral on YouTube, being compared to the character Pico from the upcoming videogame Friday Night Funkin'.
