= Piconzé =

1973 film directed by Yppe Nakashima

- Directed by: Ype Nakashima
- Written by: Ype Nakashima; Nelson Padrella; João Luiz Araújo
- Produced by: Silvio Renoldi; Mário Araújo; Ype Nakashima
- Cinematography: Shigueru Tomosada; Ryoji Ueno
- Edited by: Silvio Renoldi
- Music by: Damiano Cozzella; Décio Pignatari
- Production company: Telstar Filmes
- Distributed by: Distar Filmes
- Release date: January 24, 1973
- Running time: 80 minutes
- Country: Brazil
- Language: Portuguese
- Budget: Cr$ 400,000

Piconzé is a 1973 Brazilian animated film written and directed by Ype Nakashima. It's the first color animated Brazilian feature film.

== Plot ==
The story is set in a village called Green Valley, where Piconzé lives with his friends: Papo Louro the parrot and Chico Leitão the pig. When Gustavo Bigodão kidnaps Maria Esmeralda, Piconzé's girlfriend, the three set off to the rescue. Along the way, they encounter a dragon and a witch, crossing the kingdom of Saci.
