= Boy and the World =

2013 film directed by Alê Abreu

- Theatrical release poster
- Directed by: Alê Abreu
- Written by: Alê Abreu
- Produced by: Tita Tessler; Fernanda Carvalho
- Starring: Vinicius Garcia; Felipe Zilse; Alê Abreu; Lu Horta; Marco Aurélio Campos; Cassius Romero
- Edited by: Alê Abreu
- Music by: Ruben Feffer; Gustavo Kurlat
- Production company: Filme de Papel
- Distributed by: Espaço Filmes
- Release dates: September 20, 2013 (OIAF); January 17, 2014 (Brazil)
- Running time: 80 minutes
- Country: Brazil
- Language: Portuguese (spoken backwards)
- Box office: $277,143

Boy and the World (Portuguese: O Menino e o Mundo) is a 2013 Brazilian animated coming-of-age adventure comedy-drama film written and directed by Alê Abreu. The film was created using a mix of both drawing and painting and digital animation. It was nominated at the 88th Academy Awards for Best Animated Feature.

== Plot ==
Cuca lives a very simple and blissful life with his parents. He spends his days playing in the forest, interacting with the animals, and listening to various sounds (represented by glowing balls of light). One day, Cuca's father leaves by train to find work, saddening Cuca with the nostalgia of playing with his mom and dad. Feeling that he will never be happy again, Cuca leaves with a large suitcase that contains only a picture of him and his parents. While waiting for the train, a sudden gust of wind lifts him up and carries him far away to a world that appears to have two moons.

Cuca is rescued by an old man and his pet dog, who promptly take him to work alongside them in the cotton fields. While there, Cuca hears the music of a traveling parade led by a young man in a rainbow poncho. The foreman of the cotton fields goes over his workers, and fires those who are unable due to advanced age or sickness. Cuca, the old man, and the dog travel many nights through the countryside before stopping under a large pink-leaved tree. In the distance, Cuca spots his father traveling on the back of a truck. He leaves the suitcase to the old man and follows the main road.

He arrives at a factory where the workers churn the cotton into fabric in robotic unison. At the end of the day, Cuca takes a bus into a grimy city and ends up staying with a young factory worker who is later revealed to be the rainbow poncho-wearing leader of the parade. In the morning, Cuca and the young man arrive at the market where the young man busks as a street musician to earn more money. While playing with a kaleidoscope, Cuca ends up on a barge where he learns that the fabrics are taken to a futuristic utopian city floating above the ocean. The fabrics are turned into clothing and repackaged out of sight in the city's dark underbelly, before being shipped back and sold in the grimy city. He reunites with the young man and the two sneak into the factory where the young man makes a rainbow poncho. They witness the factory's manager make a deal with a strange business man to replace the workers with a large automated machine. The young man and the rest of the workers are fired but a truck arrives to take them to work in the cotton fields.

While making their way back to the city, Cuca and the young man are stopped in traffic by the parade. Cuca suddenly spots the train his father came on and, using the young man's bike, arrives at the station to greet his father. However, Cuca is shocked to see multiple fathers who all look the same and all came to the city for a similar purpose. The parade is forcefully stopped by the city's army (represented by a giant, rainbow bird being defeated in combat by a militaristic black bird) and parts of the city lie in ruin. Cuca witnesses young children in the slums arming themselves with primitive weapons and preparing to start a rebellion. The young man looks on from a hill made of trash.

Cuca runs back home where he witnesses various machines taking over the countryside (inter-cut with live-action footage of deforestations and heavy carbon dioxide emissions). He arrives back at the pink-leaved tree, where it is revealed that the old man is actually an older Cuca, and that the tree is outside his now dilapidated childhood home. In a flashback, the young man in the rainbow poncho, who is also Cuca, is seen leaving home and saying goodbye to his mother while seeing a pink-leaved sapling. Old Cuca pins the photo of him and his family to a wall and dons his rainbow poncho. He looks out and finds that his abandoned childhood home is surrounded by newer houses and farmers whose children continue to play and sing songs. The film ends with one final flashback of Cuca and his parents planting the seed that will become the pink-leaved tree as the screen fades to white.

== Cast ==
- Vinicius Garcia as Cuca (Menino)
- Felipe Zilse as Young Man (Jovem) / Additional voices
- Alê Abreu as Old Man (Velho)
- Lu Horta as Cuca's mother (Mãe)
- Marco Aurélio Campos as Cuca's father (Pai)
- Cassius Romero as Dog (Cachorro)

== Production ==
The production of Boy and the World began in August 2010. The feature film originated from an animated documentary that would have been called Canto Latino. Regarding the development of the film, director Alê Abreu said: "I like to say that Boy and the World was born within another film. At the time, I was working in TVO on the development of an anima-doc (documentary with animation) called 'Canto Latino,' which looked at the social, political, and economic formation of Latin America, highlighting how our countries share such a common history and how it relates to the globalization of today." The film received a support of 750 thousand reais from the cinema fund of Brazilian Development Bank (BNDES).

== Technique ==
Abreu explored various techniques to create the fantasy universe in which the story takes place. The creation of the settings and characters was done using colored pencils, crayons, collage, and paints. With the intention of making the actions more relevant than words, the dialogues were recorded in a version of backward Portuguese, making the speech incomprehensible.

The sounds and noises were specially created for the film. Sounds such as those of animals, winds, machines, and characters—typically recorded from the real world and edited into films—were entirely recreated to form a language that represented the perception of the boy Cuca. When we hear a truck or a cicada, it is not a real truck or cicada, but sounds that are completely created to convey how Cuca perceives the world around him. The only sounds that diverge from this rule are the thunder and the water from the flood scene.

== Releases ==
In Brazil, the film premiered in theaters on January 17, 2014. In the United States, the screening rights for the film were purchased by the American company GKIDS, which was set to release it in the United States in 2015, but without a specified date. The film has been sold to 80 countries, including major markets such as Canada and Japan. The film was released in Portugal on May 12, 2016.

== Box office ==
Boy and the World had low box office performance in Brazilian theaters, with 3,891 viewers in its first two days of release. In total, the film was watched by 35,000 people in theaters. However, the film performed well in France. Released in 2014, it attracted over 100,000 viewers in French theaters.

== Reception ==
Boy and the World received critical acclaim. The film holds a 93% on Rotten Tomatoes with a 7.8/10 average rating based on 57 reviews. The consensus reads, "Boy and the World's distinctive animation is visually thrilling – and it's backed up with a daring, refreshingly different storyline that should enthrall younger viewers while resonating deeply with adults." Metacritic, which uses a weighted average, assigned the film a score of 80 out of 100, based on 18 critics, indicating "generally favorable" reviews.

The film's worldwide premiere occurred at the Ottawa International Animation Festival where it won an Honourable Mention for Best Animated Feature "Because it was full of some of the most beautiful images we've ever seen". It also earned an honorable mention at the Festival do Rio and won the Youth Award at the Mostra de Cinema de São Paulo. At the Festival de Cinema de Animação de Lisboa, it won the Best Film Award. At the Annecy International Animated Film Festival, it won the Cristal Award for Best Feature Film, and was voted the favorite film by the audience. In 2015, at Animafest Zagreb, the film won the Grand Prix for feature film. The jury stated that they have awarded the film because it uses innovative artwork, combines both political and emotional feelings, that took them on a colorful trip. In 2016, Boy and the World won the 43rd Annie Awards for Best Animated Feature-Independent.

== Possible television series ==
In 2016, it was announced that a spin-off series titled Menino and the Children of the World had entered development. The educational series combines animation with live action footage and features the character of Cuca and his dog traveling to various countries of the world and learning about their culture through the eyes of children. As of 2025 , there is no planned release date or more news related to this project

== See also ==
- Cinema of Brazil
- Arthouse animation
