= Anima Mundi (event) =

Animation festival in Brazil

- Status: Inactive since 2020
- Genre: Animation
- Locations: Rio de Janeiro and São Paulo
- Country: Brazil
- Inaugurated: 1993; 33 years ago
- Website: www.animamundi.com.br

Anima Mundi was a competitive film festival in Brazil, devoted exclusively to Animation. It was usually held every July in Rio de Janeiro, with smaller side editions in São Paulo and Belo Horizonte. Started in 1993, the festival ended in 2020 due to lack of funding and government support.

== History ==
The first edition of Anima Mundi happened in 1993, in Rio de Janeiro. The festival was created by a group of animators and filmmakers who wanted to raise awareness about animated productions and films in Brazil.

== The sessions ==
The festival sessions consists of five different types:

- Shorts films (1 hour sessions of films that are running in the competitive session. The portfolio (films made for hire) are shown in these sessions also).
- Feature films.
- Children's short films (films made for children).
- Animation in course.
- Panorama (short films that are not in the competition).
- Future animator (films made by children).

== Open Studio ==
In the main area of the festival there are several mini-workshops that teach the public how to animate in several styles. There are pixilation, stop motion, hand drawn.

== Other activities ==
The Anima Mundi crew is also responsible for several other activities including Anima Escola which teaches animation in several public schools in Brasil and the Anima Mundi Itinerante that shows selected films in several other cities in Brazil.

There is also a contest of web and cellular phone animation that runs concurrently with the festival named Anima Mundi Web and Anima Mundi Cell. The participant animations are chosen by the public on the internet (a registration is required to vote) and the winner has their movie shown in the festival sessions.
